= Lai Chuanzhu =

People's liberation Army general

General Lai Chuanzhu
- 赖传珠
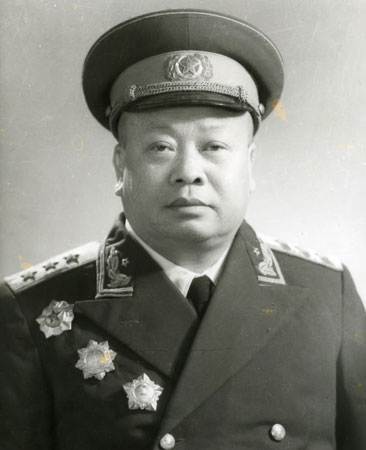
- Lai Chuanzhu

Political Commissar of the Shenyang Military Region
- In office October 1959 – December 1965
- Preceded by: Zhou Huan
- Succeeded by: Zeng Shaoshan

Political Commissar of the Beijing Military Region
- In office October 1958 – October 1959
- Preceded by: Zhu Liangcai
- Succeeded by: Liao Hansheng

Personal details
- Born: April 3, 1910 Gan County, Jiangxi, Qing China
- Died: December 24, 1965 (aged 55) Shenyang, Liaoning, People's Republic of China
- Party: Chinese Communist Party
- Awards: August 1 Medal (First Class Medal); Order of Independence and Freedom (First Class Medal); Order of Liberation (China) (First Class Medal)

Military service
- Allegiance: People's Republic of China
- Branch/service: People's Liberation Army Ground Force
- Years of service: 1926–1965
- Rank: General
- Commands: Chinese Workers' and Peasants' Red Army; Fourth Field Army
- Battles/wars: Chinese Civil War; Second Sino-Japanese War; New Fourth Army incident Landing Operation on Hainan Island

Lai Chuanzhu (simplified Chinese: 赖传珠; traditional Chinese: 賴傳珠; pinyin: Lài Chuánzhū; 3 April 1910 – 24 December 1965) or Peng Ying (鹏英) was a general of the People's Liberation Army from Gan County, Jiangxi.

Lai joined the Communist Youth League of China in November 1926, the Chinese Communist Party in April 1927 and the Chinese Workers' and Peasants' Red Army in March 1928. Following outbreak of the Chinese Civil War, he was appointed as the 33rd Group Commander and Political Commissar in the Chinese Red Army, Chief of Staff of the 12th Division, Red Fifth Army's 37th Political Secretary, Vice Minister of the Organization Department of the Red Army and other key positions. He embarked on the Long March as the Acting Minister of the Provincial Committee of CPC Shaanxi-Gansu Region. During the Second Sino-Japanese War, he served as the New Fourth Army's Chief of Staff, Jiangbei Headquarters Chief of Staff. After the establishment of PRC, he was the Thirteenth Corps, Beijing and Shenyang Military Region's political commissar.

== Biography ==
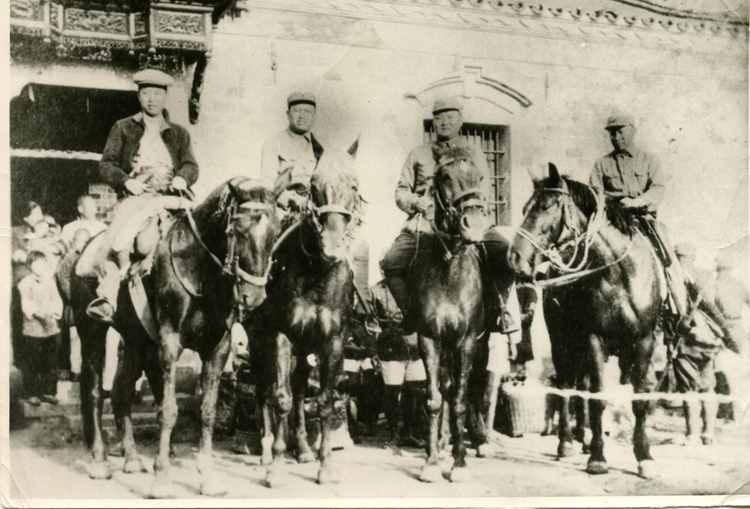
Ye Ting and others at the New Fourth Army Jiangbei Headquarters in 1939. From left: Ye Ting, Lai Chuanzhu, Luo Binghui, Zhang Yunyi.

=== Early Revolutionary Years ===
After joining the Communist Youth League of China in November 1926, Lai went to Guidong County, Hunan to join the army under the command of Mao Zedong. Having ascended to key leadership position within the Fourth Army, he went on to participate in the Huangyang Boundary Battle in 1928. As one of the divisional commanders of the New Fourth Army, he went on to attend the Gutian Congress. Lai suffered a facial wound during the First Encirclement Campaign against Jiangxi Soviet in January 1930.

From December 1931 onward, he was appointed as the 13th Red Army Political Department's Secretary-General and 37th division political commissar, participating in the Ganzhou Campaign. In March 1933, Lai has filled many roles, such as director of the 13th Division's Political Department and political commissar for the 5th and 13th Corps. After participating in the Encirclement Campaigns, Lai embarked on the Long March in October 1934. With his arrival in Shanbei, he was made a deputy minister of the Soviet and concurrently was the political commissar for the region.

=== Second Sino-Japanese War (1936-1945) ===
In November 1937 Lai was transferred to the New Fourth Army as the Director of the General Staff Office. In 1939, New Fourth Army Commander Ye Ting and Lai brought the army out of the Dabie Mountains to rendezvous at the Jiangbei regions. By October 1940, Lai was appointed as the central headquarters chief of staff. Following the New Fourth Army incident in 1941 and the consequent annihilation of the army, Lai was appointed as chief of staff to re-establish the New Fourth Army. Thereafter, Lai assisted other commanders (Chen Yi, Liu Shaoqi, Zhang Yunyi, Rao Shushi among others) at the Central Anti-Japanese Base Command which resisted Japanese occupation.

=== Chinese Civil War (1945-1949) ===
In October 1945, Lai was appointed as the Shandong Field Army's column political commissar. In September 1947, he took part in the Liaoshen Campaign as the political commissar for the sixth column of the Southwest Army (later became a field army). During the campaign, Hong Yongsheng and him flanked and surrounded the Nationalist army group led by Liao Yaoxiang. In November 1948, he was appointed as one of the Fourth Field Army's political commissar and led troops which besieged Beijing, forcing Fu Zuoyi to shift key troops to counter them. Following the capture of Guangzhou on 14 October, Lai was appointed the Guangdong military region's first deputy political commissar.

=== After the Establishment of the PRC ===
In December 1949, Lai and Deng Hua were tasked to head the Landing Operation on Hainan Island. In 1950, communist landing operations was conducted with forces equivalent to two armies albeit the absence of a navy and air force to support the troops landing in small wooden crafts. The landed forces surrounded Xue Yue's forces and captured Haikou. Xue Yue had no choice but to retreat to Taiwan, and the People's Liberation Army took control of the whole Hainan Peninsula. This campaign was the first amphibious assault won by the PLA.

In September 1950, Lai was made the deputy minister of the Central Military Commission's political cadre department, responsible for the 1955 PLA rank evaluation process. In 1955, he was awarded with the rank of general (shang jiang), Order of Bayi (First Class), Order of Independence and Freedom (First Class) and Order of Liberation (First Class). In October 1959, he was made the second political commissar of the Shenyang Military Region. He is a member of the 1st, 2nd and 3rd Central Military Commission of the People's Republic of China and the National People's Congress. On 24 December 1965, Lai Chuanzhu died in Shenyang, Liaoning.

Military offices
Preceded by Zhu Liangcai	Political Commissar of the Beijing Military Region; 1958–1959	Succeeded by Liao Hansheng
Preceded by Zhou Huan	Political Commissar of the Shenyang Military Region; 1959–1965	Succeeded by Zeng Shaoshan
