= Shangguan Yunxiang =

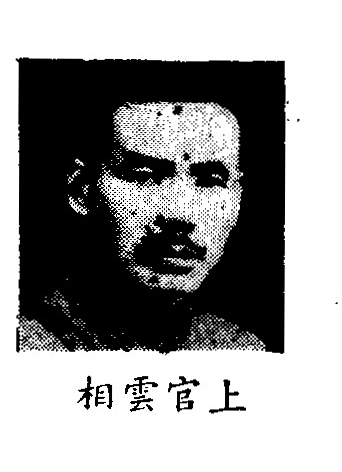
- Born: 26 February 1895; Shanghe County, Jinan, Shandong, Qing China
- Died: 8 August 1969 (aged 74) Taipei, Taiwan
- Allegiance: Republic of China
- Branch: (Republic of China (1912–1949)) National Revolutionary Army
- Service years: 1917-1950
- Commands: 47th Division; 9th Army; 11th Army; 32nd Army Group
- Conflicts: Chinese Civil War; Encirclement campaign against the Hunan-Jiangxi Soviet; Second encirclement campaign against the Jiangxi Soviet; Third encirclement campaign against the Jiangxi Soviet; New Fourth Army incident; Central Plains War; Battle of Shangcai; Second Battle of Mi County; Battle of Xinzheng; Battle of Eastern Henan; Second Sino-Japanese War; Battle of Shanghai; Battle of Nanchang; 1939–40 Winter Offensive; Second Battle of Changsha

Shangguan Yunxiang (traditional Chinese: 上官雲相; simplified Chinese: 上官云相; pinyin: Shàngguān Yúnxiàng; Wade–Giles: Shang-kuan Yun-hsiang; 26 February 1895 - 8 August 1969) was a Chinese National Revolutionary Army general during the Chinese Civil War and the Second Sino-Japanese War. He was the brother-in-law of Kuomintang general Yu Hanmou.

== Early life ==
Shangguan was born in Shanghe County in 1895. He enrolled in the infantry division of the Baoding Military Academy in 1917, being in the same class as Ye Ting and Gu Zhutong. After graduating in 1919, he served under Sun Chuanfang, and was eventually promoted in Sun's army. After the Beijing Coup in 1924, the Fengtian clique went south to occupy Jiangsu but was defeated by Sun. In 1925, with the support of Zhang Zongchang, Shi Congbin went south to attack Sun's forces. Shangguan led a group of troops, defeated Shi's forces and captured Shi himself.

== Service with the Kuomintang ==
In 1927, in order to resist the National Revolutionary Army's Northern Expedition, Sun Chuanfang allied himself with Zhang Zongchang. Zhang led his army south to support Sun Chuanfang. Shangguan disagreed with Sun over his alliance with Zhang and was forced into exile in Japan. In 1928, he returned to China and joined the National Revolutionary Army as the brigade commander of the 141st brigade of the 47th Division. In March 1929, he was promoted to the commander of the 47th Division, and in July he was promoted to the commander of the Ninth Army to participate in the Central Plains War and the campaign against the Chinese Communist Party. His troops suffered heavy losses in 1931 during the battle of Huangbei in Liantang during the third encirclement campaign of the Jiangxi Soviet. The following year, the 47th division engaged in the encirclement and suppression of Hubei, Henan, Anhui, and Jiangsu areas controlled by the communists. After the Chinese Workers' and Peasants' Red Army were expelled from the Central Soviet Area in 1934, he led his army to participate in the pursuit of the Red Army during the Long March. In 1935, he was promoted to lieutenant general. In 1936, he resigned because of a corruption scandal. On 4 May 1937, the Military Commission appointed him as the director of the appeasement office in the border areas of Henan, Hubei, and Shaanxi . After the beginning of the Second Sino-Japanese War, he served as the commander of the 11th Army, and was promoted to commander-in-chief of the 32nd Army Group the following year. In 1940, Shangguan led his department to move to the south of Anhui, and launched the New Fourth Army incident against the New Fourth Army in early 1941. Shortly thereafter he was promoted to deputy commander of the third theater. In 1947, Shangguan served as the deputy director of the Baoding appeasement office, and the following year as deputy commander-in-chief of the North China anti bandit commission.

In 1949, Shangguan left for Taiwan along with the Kuomintang government. He retired the following year and died in Taipei on 8 August 1969.
