= Yuan Guoping =

Chinese Army officer (1906–1941)

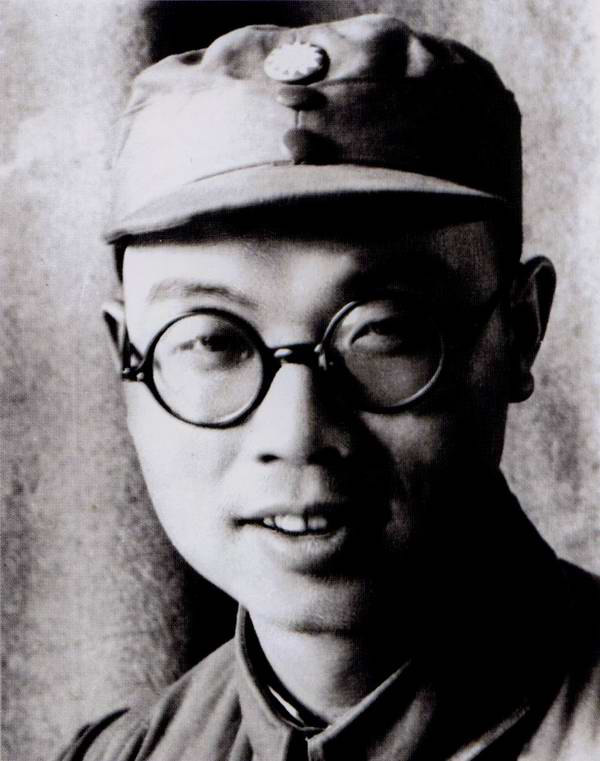
- Born: May 1906; Baoqing (present-day Shaoyang, Hunan
- Died: January 12, 1941 (aged 34) Jing County, Anhui
- Allegiance: Chinese Communist Party
- Branch: National Revolutionary Army (until 1927); Chinese Red Army; New Fourth Army
- Conflicts: Northern Expedition; Chinese Civil War Nanchang Uprising Guangzhou Uprising First Encirclement Campaign against Jiangxi Soviet Second Encirclement Campaign against Jiangxi Soviet Third Encirclement Campaign against Jiangxi Soviet Fourth Encirclement Campaign against Jiangxi Soviet; Second Sino-Japanese War New Fourth Army Incident
- Spouse: Qiu Yihan
- Children: Yuan Zhenwei

Yuan Guoping (Chinese: 袁国平; 1906 – 15 January 1941) was a Communist army officer who participated in the Northern Expedition, the first phase of the Chinese Civil War (1927–37) and the Second Sino-Japanese War.

== Early life ==
Born in Baoqing (in present-day Shaodong County), Hunan Province, Yuan joined the Communist Youth League in 1924, at the age of 18. In October 1925, he joined the Chinese Communist Party while attending Whampoa Military Academy. In July 1926, he participated in the Northern Expedition as a member of the Kuomintang Fourth Army. Later, he joined Communist uprisings against the Kuomintang in Nanchang, Jiangxi province (August 1, 1927) and Guangzhou, Guangdong province (December 13, 1927) before going to southern Jiangxi in defense of the Chinese Soviet Republic against multiple Kuomintang attacks.

== Second Sino-Japanese War and death ==
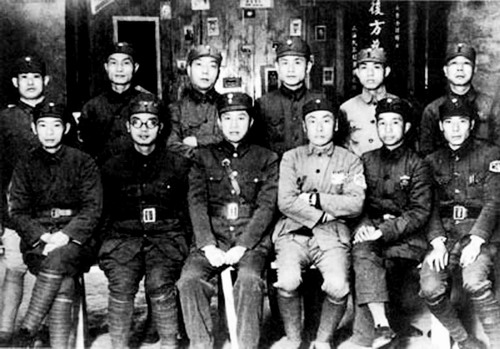
1940 group photo of New Fourth Army commanders who had participated in the Nanchang Uprising of 1927. Front row from left: Zhou Zikun, Yuan Guoping, Ye Ting, Chen Yi and Su Yu. Zhou and Yuan both died the following year

In March 1938, he was made a representative of the Chinese Communist Party in the New Fourth Army. Yuan was killed by Kuomintang forces in the New Fourth Army Incident. In June 1955, he was interred at Yuhuatai Memorial Park of Revolutionary Martyrs, alongside Zhou Zikun.
