= Battle of Yongjiazhen =

1945 battle

- Part of the Chinese Civil War
Date	August 16, 1945 – August 19, 1945
Location	Central Anhui, China
Result	Communist victory

Belligerents
Republic of China	Chinese Red Army

Commanders and leaders
Unknown	Tan Xilin

Strength
2,300	8,000+

Casualties and losses
2,300	Minor

The Battle of Yongjiazhen (雍家镇战斗) was fought during the aftermath of World War II in the Yongjiazhen (雍家镇) region of central Anhui, China between Communist forces and Kuomintang forces who had allied with the Japanese. The battle was part of the Chinese Civil War, resulting in a victory for the People's Liberation Army.

== Prelude ==
Like similar clashes between the communists and nationalists in the aftermath of World War II in China, the battle was partly due to the realisation by Kuomintang (nationalist) leader Chiang Kai-shek that his regime had neither sufficient troops or transportation to allow him to deploy in the Japanese-occupied regions of China. Since the communists (who dominated most rural areas of the country) could expand their territory by accepting the Japanese surrender, Chiang ordered the Japanese (and the Chinese puppet regime) not to surrender to the communists. This would maintain order in the Japanese-controlled regions and help fight off the communists until the arrival and deployment of Kuomintang troops. As a result of this order, most members of the Japanese military forces rejoined the nationalists.

However, most of these forces were not from Chiang's own circle. They were primarily warlord troops only nominally under Chiang's command before the war; they were Kuomintang in name only, and maintained much of their autonomous status. These warlords were primarily interested in maintaining their own power, and defected to the Japanese when Japan offered to let them retain their power in exchange for collaboration. After World War II ended, these forces returned to the Kuomintang for the same reason they had defected. For Chiang, it was difficult to sever his relationship with the warlords; this would alienate other factions within the nationalist ranks, and the warlords were still useful to him. Chiang's objectives, therefore, were to solve the problems of the warlords and the communists; by the end of the civil war, this proved impossible.

== Nationalist strategy ==
Even if the communists were able to take control of the Japanese-occupied territories, this would still be beneficial to Chiang. The communists were strong enough to greatly reduce the strength of the warlords; at the same time the communists would be weakened by the fighting, making it easier for the Kuomintang to prevail.

The warlords gladly followed Chiang's orders, and they were eager to prove themselves. They were aware that, due to their collaboration with the Japanese during the Second Sino-Japanese War, they were hated by the general Chinese population (including those nationalists who had refused to surrender to, or stop fighting, the Japanese). The order from Chiang not to surrender, and to fight the communists, was a lifeline for them.

== Communist strategy ==
The communist strategy was simpler than that employed by the Kuomintang, since there were no large divisions within the communist ranks. They had already earned considerable popular support as the only Chinese force left in the region actively fighting the Japanese (and their puppet regime) after the withdrawal of the nationalists. After successfully establishing communist bases in rural areas, life there was better for the general population than it was in regions held by the Japanese.

== Order of battle ==
=== Nationalists ===
- Two battalions of the Fourth Division
- One battalion of the county self-defense regiment
- One regiment and one battalion of the Second Division

=== Communists ===
- Seventh Column of the New Fourth Army
- Nineteenth Brigade
- One independent regiment

== Battle ==
On August 16, 1945, the communists decided to take Yongjiazhen, in eastern Anhui, by force after two battalions of the Fourth Nationalist Division and their Japanese allies refused to surrender. The 55th and 56th Regiments of the communist 19th Brigade, assisted by the Seventh Column, launched their assault on the town at dawn; by dusk, the town was under communist control. The nationalist and Japanese defenders suffered over 900 casualties, and the communists captured three machine guns, one 60mm mortar and over 100 firearms.

A few days later, on August 19, the 19th Brigade (assisted by a communist independent regiment) launched an assault on Yuncao in Hanshan County (west of Yongjiazhen), which was guarded by a regiment and battalion of the nationalist Second Division. The brigade took the town, after defeating its defenders and nationalist reinforcements. This battle caused over 1300 nationalist and 21 Japanese fatalities. Ninety-eight nationalist troops and twenty-one Japanese troops were captured by the communists (who also seized three artillery pieces, six heavy machine guns, over twenty light machine guns and over 700 rifles).

== Outcome ==
Like similar clashes immediately after World War II between the communists and the Kuomintang, this conflict demonstrated that Chiang's attempts to simultaneously solve the warlord and communist problems was an impossible task. Although the power of the warlords was weakened as their forces were defeated by the communists, any gains for the nationalists were negated by political fallout from their alliance with the Japanese.

== See also ==
- Outline of the Chinese Civil War
- National Revolutionary Army
- History of the People's Liberation Army
