= New Fourth Army =

Chinese Communist Party unit (1937–1947)

- Active: 12 October 1937 – 23 January 1947
- Country: China
- Allegiance: Chinese Communist Party
- Branch: National Revolutionary Army (de jure)
- Type: Army Light Infantry
- Role: Guerrilla Warfare
- Size: 10,300+ (1937) 290,000+ (1947)
- Part of: CCP Central Military Commission; Nationalist Government Military Affairs Commission
- Garrison/HQ: Jiangsu, Anhui
- Motto: Resolving the National Crisis (共赴國難)
- Colors: Grey Uniform
- Equipment: Hanyang 88, Chiang Kai-shek rifle, Type 38 rifle, Type 99 rifle, Mauser C96, Nambu pistol, Type 41 75 mm Mountain Gun
- Engagements: Second Sino-Japanese War, Chinese Civil War

Commanders
- Notable commanders: Ye Ting, Xiang Ying, Liu Shaoqi, Chen Yi, Su Yu

Insignia
- Arm badge (1945)

- Arm badge (1941)

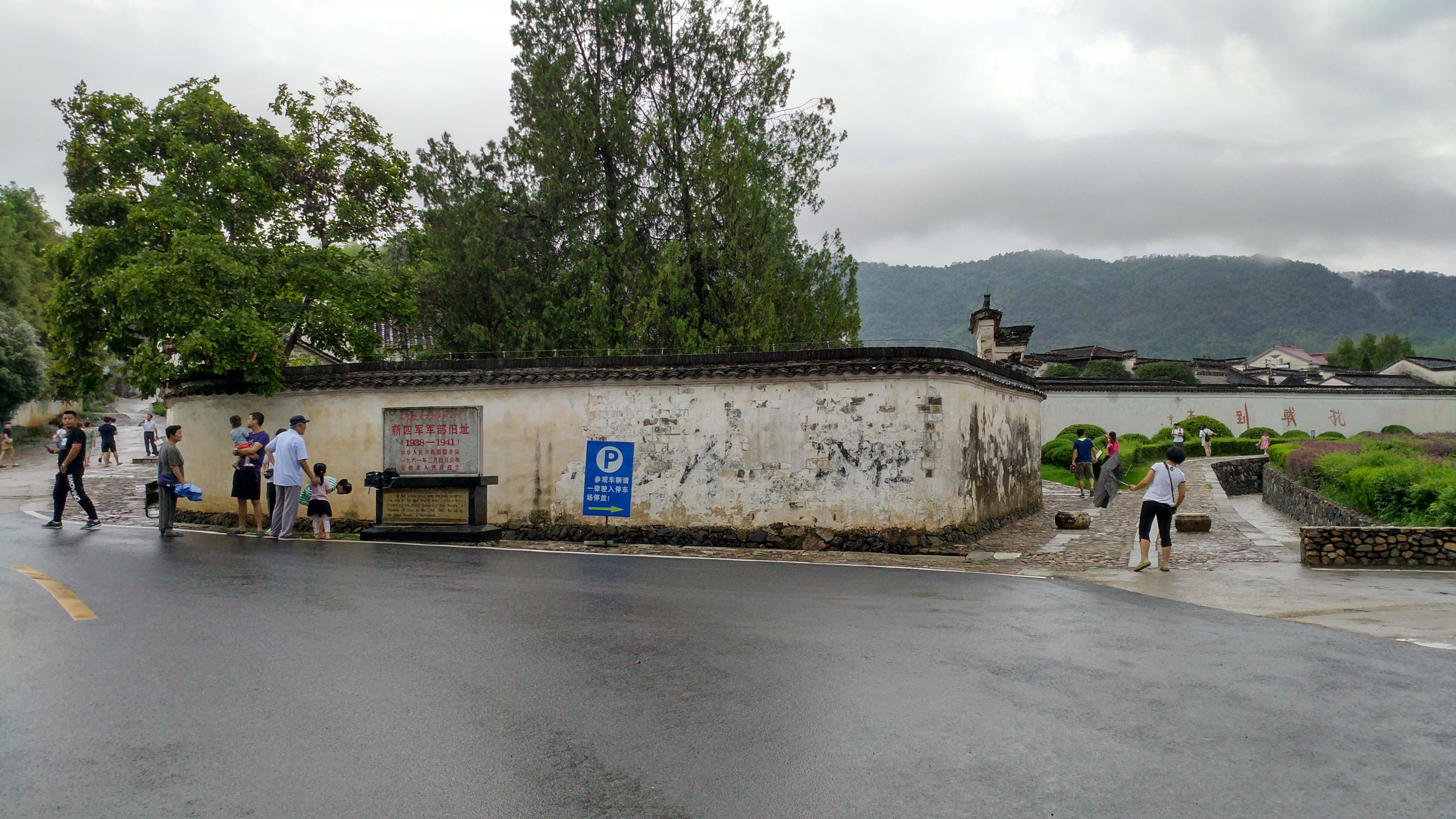
Headquarters of New Fourth Army in Jing County, Anhui

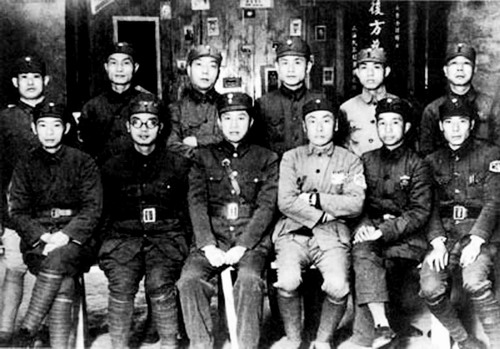
1940 group photo of New Fourth Army commanders who had participated in the Nanchang Uprising of 1927. Front row from left: Zhou Zikun, Yuan Guoping, Ye Ting, Chen Yi and Su Yu.

The New Fourth Army (N4A; simplified Chinese: 新四军; traditional Chinese: 新四軍; pinyin: Xīn Sì Jūn) was a military unit nominally under the banner of the National Revolutionary Army (NRA) of the Republic of China, established in 1937 as part of the Second United Front during the Second Sino-Japanese War. However, in practice, the New Fourth Army was under the exclusive command of the Chinese Communist Party (CCP) and operated independently of the Kuomintang (KMT)'s central military command. Unlike most NRA units, which were directly overseen by the Nationalist Government, the N4A maintained separate political and operational structures aligned with CCP objectives.

The New Fourth Army and the Eighth Route Army were the two main CCP military forces from 1938. The New Fourth Army was active south of the Yangtze River (Chang Jiang), while the Eighth Route Army was based in Yan'an in the northwest. Members of the New Fourth Army wore their badges on the left arm, with "N4A" and the soldier's unit and name listed on the badge.

After the Xi'an Incident, the Kuomintang led by Chiang Kai-shek and the Chinese Communist Party led by Mao Zedong formed a United Front against Japan, which was already in control of Manchuria and pushing into North China. The Marco Polo Bridge Incident in July 1937 marked the beginning of the Sino-Japanese War (1937–1945).

In October 1937, an announcement was made that Red Army soldiers active in the eight provinces in southern China — those who did not embark on the Long March would be part of the New Fourth Army. The New Fourth Army was established on December 25, 1937 in Hankou, moving to Nanchang on January 6, 1938, when the detachments began marching to the battlefront. At the beginning, the New Fourth Army had four detachments and one task force battalion and numbered roughly ten thousand. Later the army moved to Anhui province. Ye Ting was the army commander, Xiang Ying the deputy army commander.

It was in theory a united front against Japan but in practice there was friction between Nationalist and CCP forces, which intensified in the fall of 1940, culminating in the New Fourth Army Incident with a full-fledged battle between the New Fourth Army and KMT National Revolutionary Army forces. Up until that point, most of the battles had been skirmishes. The army was fully reorganized after the incident and remained in active combat until the end of the war.

== History ==
The Second Sino-Japanese War began on 7 July 1937 with the Marco Polo Bridge incident. As part of the Second United Front of the CCP and the Nationalists against the invading Japanese imperial forces, the Chinese Red Army was incorporated into the National Revolutionary Army, forming the Eighth Route Army and the New Fourth Army.

=== 1937–1938 ===
In 1938, the 1st, 2nd and 3rd detachments began marching to the battlefront in southern Anhui and southern Jiangsu. The 4th detachment got northern and middle Anhui. Due to being in the back of the Japanese army, the New Fourth Army didn't eliminate very many Japanese troops at first. The majority of the time they were establishing base areas and enlisting new recruits. After the Japanese had occupied Wuhan the New Fourth Army took the opportunity to set up several guerrilla camps in the area.

In January 1938, the New Fourth Army formed its Battlefield Service Troupe. The group did propaganda work among soldiers, peasants, and other local people, teaching songs and other performances.

=== 1939–1940 ===
In 1939 the Japanese Army stopped attacking the Nationalist forces on a large scale. The New Fourth Army was restricted to the south of the Yangtze River. In order to establish a new base area the New Fourth Army sent an advance team to Northern Jiangsu and clashed with guerrillas of the Nationalist forces there. In the battle of Huangqiao the New Fourth Army destroyed the 89th Army and the 33rd division of the Nationalist forces. The Eighth Route Army also dispatched the 4th detachment's 12,000 men to support the New Fourth Army.

=== 1941–1943 ===
In January 1941, in what became known as the New Fourth Army incident the Nationalist forces surrounded and destroyed the headquarters of the New Fourth Army in retaliation, losing the New Fourth Army about 8,000 men. The commander of the New Fourth Army was also caught.

The Chinese Communist Party (CCP) made a strong protest and announced the rebuilding the New Fourth Army in northern Jiangsu. In Jiangsu, it again expanded. At this time the New Fourth Army already had seven divisions and 90,000 soldiers. Between 1941 and 1943, the New Fourth Army fought mainly with the Japanese and lost a portion of the Army's base areas. Because of heavy losses the 6th Division's designation was revoked.

=== 1944–1945 ===
By the end of the war, the New Fourth Army had fought 22,000 battles against the Japanese in central and southern China. Because the New Fourth Army operated in pockets among the Japanese forces, collaborationist regimes, and the Nationalist Forces, it often engaged in action and fought against Japanese mopping-up campaigns.

The New Fourth Army established base areas that covered three 253,000 square kilometres and which had a population of three million. By 1945, the New Fourth Army had grown to 215,000, with a further 97,000-strong local military force.

Due to a lack of troops the Japanese ceased actively attacking the New Fourth Army. Several fierce battles erupted again between the New Fourth Army and the Nationalist forces. In order to quickly occupy northeast China political commissar Huang Kecheng ordered the 3rd Division's 35,000 men to leave his base area.

=== Overall Campaign ===
In April 1938, the New Fourth Army had 10,329 direct troops. By July 1945, the army's strength had swelled to 215,325 direct troops, 97,547 local armed forces, and 960,603 militiamen. From May 1938 to May 1946, the New Fourth Army fought 24,617 battles against Japanese and Chinese collaborationist troops, claiming to have killed or wounded 117,605 Japanese troops and 176,101 collaborationist troops and captured 2,022 Japanese troops and 122,181 collaborationist troops. Additionally, 30 Japanese troops and 60,825 collaborationist troops defected to the New Fourth Army. Casualties of the New Fourth Army fighting against the two units from May 1938 to January 1946 reached 51,602.

During the Second Sino-Japanese War, there were frequent frictions between Communist and Nationalist troops. From March 1940 to June 1945, the New Fourth Army fought in 3,212 battles in Anti-Diehard Army operations, claiming to have annihilated 143,320 troops (Note: 65,382 killed or wounded; 72,556 captured; 5,382 surrendered and defected) and suffered 30,544 casualties. (Note: Statistics does not include : Battles prior to March 1940; Battles in November and December 1940; The South Anhui Incident; Battles from July to December 1945)

In northern Jiangsu, homemade cannons and homemade muskets were used against the Japanese by the New Fourth Army. In 1939, Shuyang was attacked by Japan. In 1940-1941, Shuyang county's rural areas were infiltrated by the New Fourth Army. North Jiangsu had 19 anti-Japanese base regions including Shuyang county's Shahe distrct. One of the locals, Wang Shouju joined the New Fourth Army's Independent brigade's 7th regiment, 1st Company's machine gun squad which had a defective machine gun. They made their own ammunition, cannons and guns. They only had 2 bullets per fighter. They captured over 10 guns and a Japanese squad in a fort after a Chinese collaborator double agent sold out the Japanese. The Japanese had type 38 rifles. In another part of Shuyang the 7th regiment with Wang Shouju attacked another fort at Sangxu. They used home made cannons, home made rockets, grenades and bombs and used water soaked cotton quilts over wooden tables as protection. They also used firecrackers as decoy to amplify the sound of machine gun fire to deceive the defenders into taking cover and then in the moat around the fort they threw dog corpses. The dog corpses rotten in the summe heat and forced the defenders to surrender.

The use of rotting corpses to force Japanese soldiers out of fortified towers in conjunction with landmines to blow them up once their tried to leave their positions was called "Stinky dog formation" (“臭狗阵”). Flies, maggos and mosquitos spread diseases as the corpses rotted around the pillboxes, bunkers and towers.

Between the Huai and Yangtze rivers was a network of rice paddies and ponds full of rice and fish in Southern Jiangsu (Huainan) and central Jiangsu (Suzhong) that enabled Chinese guerillas to feed themselves and the watery terrain impeded Japanese movement. Many towns and cities were called "water towns" due to their canals. Watery regions with lakes and rice paddies occupied by guerillas included Dongjiang in Guangdong with the Dongjiang column, the Weishan lake and Baiyangdian base in Hebei, and the region south of the Yangtze, north of the Huai and west of the Dabie mountains which was the Central China base area, and Maoshan in Jiangnan which was inhabited by the New Fourth Army between Hangzhou, Shanghai and Nanjing in Spring 1938. 4 collaborators and 3 Japanese were captured and over 30 Japanese were injured and killed when 2 Japanese motorboats were sunk by the New Fourth Army's 2nd divison's 4th independent regiment when the were ambushed after getting caught on wooden stakes at Liuqiufen at 10:00 AM when they were heading toward's Jiangsu's Jinhu county, Jingou town on the Jigou river from Gaoyou. 6 barges ere attached to the motorboats. The battle took place on 16 March, 1945.

=== 1946–1947 ===
The Chinese Civil resumed in the summer of 1946. The Nationalist forces attacked the 5th Division first and occupied the division's base area successfully. However, in middle Jiangsu Su Yu's 1st Division won despite having fewer forces and wiped out 56,000 Nationalist soldiers. Later, because of a lack of troops the 1st, 2nd, 4th, and 7th Divisions had to withdraw to Shandong in the winter of 1946. In January 1947 the New Fourth Army and Shandong Military Region of the People's Liberation Army were merged into the East China Field Army.

== Headquarters ==
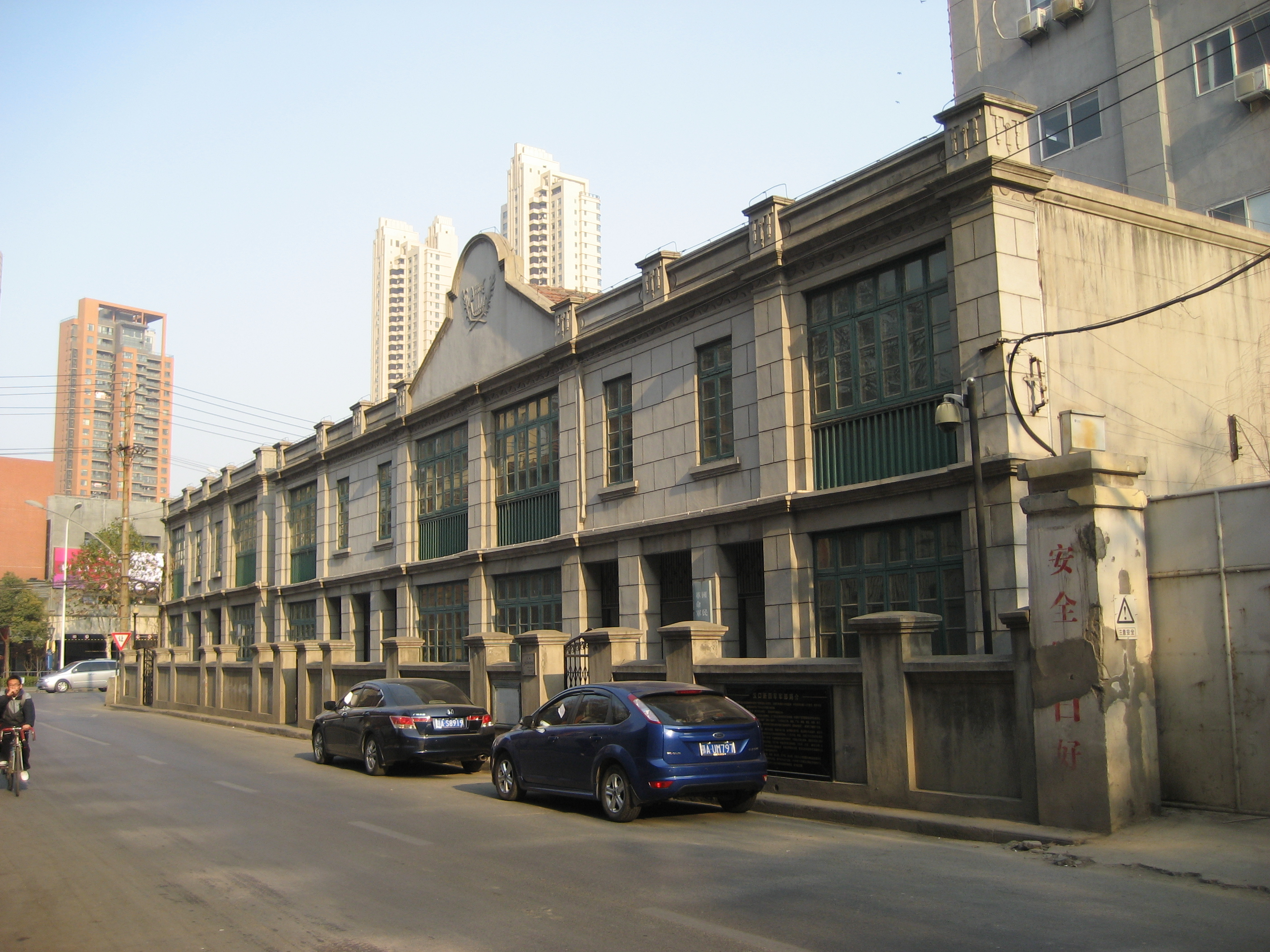
Former site of the New Fourth Army Headquarters in Hankou, Wuhan.

The New Fourth Army Headquarters (Chinese: 漢口新四軍軍部舊址) was located at No. 332-352, Shengli Street, Jiang'an District, Wuhan. The site was renovated by the Wuhan People's Government in 2005. On March 5, 2013, it was named a Major National Historical and Cultural Sites.

== Main leadership ==
military posts	First term	Second term	Third term
Commander	Ye Ting (1938.2 - 1941.1)	Chen Yi (1941.2 - 1947.1)	
Deputy Commander	Xiang Ying (1938.2 - 1941.1)	Zhang Yunyi (1941.2 - 1947.1)	
Political Commissar	vacancy	Liu Shaoqi (1941.2 - 1943.11)	Rao Shushi (1943.12 - 1947.1)
Chief of Staff	Zhang Yunyi (1938.2 - 1941.1)	Lai Chuanzhu (1941.2 - 1945.12)	Chen Shiqu (陈士渠, 1946.1 - 1947.1)
Deputy Chief of Staff	Zhou Zikun (1938.2 - 1941.1)	vacancy	Yuan Zhongxi (袁仲希, 1946.1 - 1947.1)
Director of Political Department	Yuan Guoping (1938.2 - 1941.1)	Deng Zihui (1941.2 - 1945.12)	Shu Tong (1946.1 - 1947.1)
Deputy Director of Political Department	Deng Zihui (1938.2 - 1941.1)	vacancy	Tang Liang (1946.1 - 1947.1)

== Personnel ==
=== Guerrillas ===
Most of the New Fourth Army's military officers were guerrillas of the Chinese Red Army, others being from the 8th Route Army. Experience from China's Civil War led to them rapidly expanding their forces at the beginning of the Second Sino-Japanese War. During the eight years of the war officers with excellent abilities were usually promoted faster. For example, general Zhang Aiping was only a battalion commander of Chinese Red Army in 1934 but had become a division commander of the New Fourth Army by 1945.

=== Military education ===
With the rapid expansion of the size of the army a large number of junior officers and newly recruited students needed training. Because of a lack of teachers the Eighth Route Army dispatched hundreds of military instructors to the New Fourth Army in two separate occasions. From 1940 to 1942 the New Fourth Army built and established six military training schools in the battlefield. These military training schools were collectively referred to as branches of the Counter-Japanese Military and Political University.

School	Principal	Establishment time	belongs to	Number of periods	Number of the Cadets
4th branch school	Peng Xuefeng	1940.3	4th Division	7	5000
5th branch school	Chen Yi	1940.11	3rd Division	4	3000
8th branch school	Zhang Yunyi	1941.5	2nd Division	4	3000
9th branch school	Su Yu	1942.5	1st Division	5	3300
10th branch school	Li Xiannian	1942.2	5th Division	5	5000
10th branch school (Anhui)	Tan Xilin	1945.3	7th Division	1	600

== Organization ==
In the first three years of its existence the New Fourth Army operated independently with the regiment as its basic unit. After the New Fourth Army Incident the army was reorganized into seven divisions and nineteen brigades.

=== 1938 ===
In the spring of 1938 the Chinese Red Army's surviving guerrillas in the South were organized into the New Fourth Army's four detachments.

Detachment	Commander	Order of battle	Commander	Troop strength
1st Detachment	Chen Yi	1st regiment	Fu Qiutao	2300
1st Detachment	Chen Yi	2nd regiment	Zhang Zhengkun	2300
2nd Detachment	Zhang Dingcheng	3rd regiment	Huang Huoxing	1800
2nd Detachment	Zhang Dingcheng	4th regiment	Lu Sheng	1800
3rd Detachment	Zhang Yunyi	5th regiment	Rao Shoukun	2100
3rd Detachment	Zhang Yunyi	6th regiment	Ye Fei	2100
4th Detachment	Gao Jingting	7th regiment	Yang Kezhi (杨克志)	3100
4th Detachment	Gao Jingting	8th regiment	Zhou Junming (周骏鸣)	3100
4th Detachment	Gao Jingting	9th regiment	Gu Shiduo (顾士多)	3100
4th Detachment	Gao Jingting	Pistol regiment	Zhan Huayu	3100

=== 1941 ===
After the New Fourth Army Incident the New Fourth Army was rebuilt in January, 1941.

Division	Commander	Order of battle	Commander	Troop strength
1st Division	Su Yu	1st Brigade	Ye Fei	12000
1st Division	Su Yu	2nd Brigade	Wang Bicheng	12000
1st Division	Su Yu	3rd Brigade	Tao Yong	12000
2nd Division	Zhang Yunyi	4th Brigade	Liang Congxue	18000
2nd Division	Zhang Yunyi	5th Brigade	Cheng Jun	18000
2nd Division	Zhang Yunyi	6th Brigade	Tan Xilin	18000
3rd Division	Huang Kecheng	7th Brigade	Peng Mingzhi	20000
3rd Division	Huang Kecheng	8th Brigade	Tian Shourao (田守饶)	20000
3rd Division	Huang Kecheng	9th Brigade	Zhang Aiping	20000
4th Division	Peng Xuefeng	10th Brigade	Liu Zhen	15000
4th Division	Peng Xuefeng	11th Brigade	Teng Haiqing (腾海清)	15000
4th Division	Peng Xuefeng	12th Brigade	Tan Youlin	15000
5th Division	Li Xiannian	13th Brigade	Zhou Zhijian	14000
5th Division	Li Xiannian	14th Brigade	Lou Houfu	14000
5th Division	Li Xiannian	15th Brigade	Wang Haishan	14000
6th Division	Tan Zhenlin	16th Brigade	Luo Zhongyi	8000
6th Division	Tan Zhenlin	18th Brigade	Jiang Weiqing	8000
7th Division	Zhang Dingcheng	19th Brigade	Sun Zhongde	3000
Others		Independent Brigade	Liang Xingchu	1000

=== 1945 ===
By the end of World War II the New Fourth Army had grown to 268,000 men.

Military Region	Commander	Order of battle	Commander	Troop strength
Jiangsu and Zhejiang	Su Yu	1st Detachment	Wang Bicheng	26000
Jiangsu and Zhejiang	Su Yu	2nd Detachment	He Kexi	26000
Jiangsu and Zhejiang	Su Yu	3rd Detachment	Tao Yong	26000
Jiangsu and Zhejiang	Su Yu	4th Detachment	Liao Zhengguo	26000
Jiangsu and Zhejiang	Su Yu	1st Military Subarea	Zhong Guochu	26000
Jiangsu and Zhejiang	Su Yu	2nd Military Subarea	Chen Liping	26000
Jiangsu and Zhejiang	Su Yu	3rd Military Subarea	He Minxue	26000
Middle Jiangsu	Guan Wenwei	1st Military Subarea	Huang Yifeng	11000
Middle Jiangsu	Guan Wenwei	3rd Military Subarea	Chen Yusheng	11000
Middle Jiangsu	Guan Wenwei	4th Military Subarea	Lu Sheng	11000
Middle Jiangsu	Guan Wenwei	5th Military Subarea	Wei Yongyi	11000
Middle Jiangsu	Guan Wenwei	6th Military Subarea	Bao Houchang	11000
Middle Jiangsu	Guan Wenwei	Teaching Brigade	Liu Fei	11000
2nd Division; Southern Huai River	Luo Binghui	4th Brigade	Liang Congxue	40000
2nd Division; Southern Huai River	Luo Binghui	5th Brigade	Cheng Jun	40000
2nd Division; Southern Huai River	Luo Binghui	6th Brigade	Chen Qingxian	40000
2nd Division; Southern Huai River	Luo Binghui	Eastern Route Military Subarea	Bi Zhanyun	40000
3rd Division; Northern Jiangsu	Huang Kecheng	7th Brigade	Peng Mingzhi	50000
3rd Division; Northern Jiangsu	Huang Kecheng	8th Brigade	Zhang Tianyun	50000
3rd Division; Northern Jiangsu	Huang Kecheng	10th Brigade	Liu Zhen	50000
3rd Division; Northern Jiangsu	Huang Kecheng	Independent Brigade	Qin Jian	50000
4th Division; Northern Huai River	Zhang Aiping	9th Brigade	Teng Haiqing (腾海清)	50000
4th Division; Northern Huai River	Zhang Aiping	11th Brigade	Zhang Zhen	50000
4th Division; Northern Huai River	Zhang Aiping	12th Brigade	Rao Zijian	50000
5th Division; Hubei, Anhui and Henan	Li Xiannian	13th Brigade	Zhou Zhijian	47000
5th Division; Hubei, Anhui and Henan	Li Xiannian	1st Military Subarea	Wang Haishan	47000
5th Division; Hubei, Anhui and Henan	Li Xiannian	2nd Military Subarea	Wang Haishan	47000
5th Division; Hubei, Anhui and Henan	Li Xiannian	3rd Military Subarea	He Bingyan	47000
5th Division; Hubei, Anhui and Henan	Li Xiannian	4th Military Subarea	Han Dongshan	47000
5th Division; Hubei, Anhui and Henan	Li Xiannian	5th Military Subarea	Wu Shian	47000
5th Division; Hubei, Anhui and Henan	Li Xiannian	6th Military Subarea	Chen Gang	47000
5th Division; Hubei, Anhui and Henan	Li Xiannian	Middle Henan Military Subarea	Chen Xianrui	47000
5th Division; Hubei, Anhui and Henan	Li Xiannian	Southern Hubei Military Subarea	Zhang Tixue	47000
5th Division; Hubei, Anhui and Henan	Li Xiannian	Hubei and Anhui Command	Huang Shide (黄世德)	47000
7th Division; Wanjiang River	Tan Xilin	19th Brigade	Lin Weixian	27000
7th Division; Wanjiang River	Tan Xilin	Southern Anhui Military Subarea	Liang Jinhua	27000
7th Division; Wanjiang River	Tan Xilin	Hanhe Military Subarea	Sun Zhongde	27000

== Media ==
A documentary on the women of the New Fourth Army titled My Mother: The Stories of Three Women Soldiers of the N4A aired in 2010. Created by the children of New Fourth Army Veterans, the documentary explores the experiences of women in the New Fourth Army, focusing on the lives of three of them from childhood to their old age. A book about the three featured women was published in 2011.

A televised drama, Women Soldiers of the New Fourth Army, aired in 2011. The drama tells the story of five pairs of lovers in the New Fourth Army, focusing on themes of "red youth" and "red romance".

== See also ==
- New Fourth Army Memorial Hall
- Eighth Route Army

== Notes ==
Preceded by Chinese Red Army	Armed Wing of the Chinese Communist Party; 12 October 1937-1 November 1948 with Eighth Route Army; 25 August 1937 – 1 November 1948	Succeeded by People's Liberation Army
