= Zhou Zikun =

Chinese communist officer

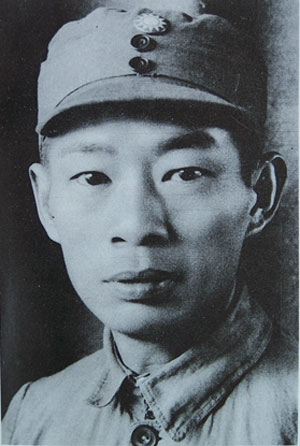
- Born: 1901 Guilin, Guangxi Province
- Died: March 14, 1941 (aged 39–40)
- Allegiance: Chinese Communist Party
- Branch: Chinese Red Army; New Fourth Army
- Conflicts: Chinese Civil War Nanchang Uprising; Second Sino-Japanese War New Fourth Army Incident

Zhou Zikun (Chinese: 周子昆) (1901 – March 14, 1941) was a Chinese communist officer who fought in the first phase of the Chinese Civil War (1927–1937) and the Second Sino-Japanese War, eventually becoming deputy chief of staff of the New Fourth Army.

== Early life ==
Born in Guangxi, Guilin, Zhou was involved in the May Fourth Movement and graduated from Guangxi's industrial school in 1919.

He began his military career in the army of a local warlord, rising to battalion commander. Zhou joined the Chinese Communist Party in October 1925.

== Chinese Civil War ==
Zhou took part in the Nanchang Uprising of 1927 with Zhu De and later retreated with him to the border area of Hunan and Jiangxi provinces in defence of the Chinese Soviet Republic.

In 1934, Zhou participated in the Long March. He rose to divisional commander and deputy chief of staff of the 5th Corps of the Chinese Red Army.

== Second Sino-Japanese War and death ==
Zhou was appointed deputy to New Fourth Army chief of staff Xiang Ying in December 1937. In the Aftermath of the New Fourth Army Incident, Zhou was murdered in Jing County, Anhui province by Liu Houzong (Chinese: 刘厚总), a member of Xiang's staff. Liu also murdered Xiang and another officer, taking the gold resources of the New Fourth Army and handing them over to the Kuomintang, who gave him a large monetary reward. Liu was jailed by the Nationalists in their wartime capital of Chongqing, but was later freed. Liu's whereabouts after 1949 are unknown, although he may have been caught and executed for his treason.
