= Wang Gui-de =

Chinese politician

Personal details
- Born: June 1914 Qing dynasty Dadi Village, Shanghang County,Fujian Province
- Died: April 7, 2017 (aged 102) ChinaBeijing City
- Profession: Politician, Soldier
- Awards: People's Republic of ChinaFirst Class August 1st Medal (1955) People's Republic of China First Order of Independence and Freedom (1955) People's Republic of China First Order of Liberation (1955)

Military service
- Allegiance: Chinese Communist Party
- Years of service: Chinese Workers' and Peasants' Red Army; The 12th Red Army

Wang Gui-de (June 1914 – April 7, 2017) was a founding lieutenant general of the People's Liberation Army. He was born in Dadi Village, Taiba Township, Shanghang County, Fujian Province, China.

== Biography ==
In 1930, Wang Guide joined the Communist Youth League of China, and in 1931, he enlisted in the Chinese Workers' and Peasants' Red Army. He became a member of the Chinese Communist Party in 1932. During the First Chinese Civil War, he held various posts, including soldier in the Shanghang County Independent Regiment, squad leader and platoon commander in the 100th Regiment, 34th Division, 12th Red Army.

In late 1931, he entered the Field School of the Fujian Military District, later serving as platoon political instructor. In August of the same year, he became political instructor of the 1st Company, Independent Regiment of Changting County. In early 1933, he was appointed political commissar of the 9th Company, 100th Regiment, and secretary of the party branch of the regiment’s political office.

During the Second Sino-Japanese War, he served as the head of the Education Section of the Political Department of the 771st Regiment, 386th Brigade, 129th Division of the Eighth Route Army in August 1937, director of the Political Department of the regiment in January 1938, and political commissar of the regiment in August 1938. He later served as director of the Political Department of the New 9th Brigade of the Jinan Military Region, political commissar of the Second Military Sub-district of the Jinan Military Region, and deputy political commissar of the Second, Fourth, and Third Military Sub-districts of the Jinan Military Region.He participated in the Battle of Guangyang, Battle of Shentouling, Battle of Xiangtangpu, the resistance against the "Nine-Route Encirclement" campaign, the Hundred Regiments Offensive, the Battle of Nanle, the Battle of Zhanci, the Battle of Handan, and other engagements.

During the Second Chinese Civil War between the Kuomintang and the Chinese Communist Party, Wang Guide successively served as deputy political commissar of the Second Military Sub-district of the Jinan Military Region, deputy political commissar of the 39th Brigade of the 13th Column of the North China Field Army, and political commissar of the 38th Brigade.In August 1948, he was appointed political commissar of the 182nd Division of the 61st Army, which was part of the 18th Corps of the First Field Army (People's Liberation Army) of the People's Liberation Army.He participated in the Linfen Campaign, the Jinzhong Campaign, the Taiyuan Campaign, and several other military operations.

Wang Guide was a delegate to the Eighth National Congress of the Chinese Communist Party, and a member of the Fifth National Committee of the Chinese People's Political Consultative Conference.

Wang in Beijing on April 7, 2017, at the age of 103.
