= Battle of Eastern Henan =

- Part of the Central Plains War
Date	August 14, 1930
Location	Longhai, eastern Henan
Result	Central Army victory

Belligerents
National Revolutionary Army Central Army	Anti-Chiang forces

Commanders and leaders
Gu Zhutong; Shangguan Yunxiang; Wang Jun	Sun Dianying

The Battle of Eastern Henan was between the Central Army of Chiang Kai-shek and those of Sun Dianying, a Henan native and ally of Feng Yuxiang and Yan Xishan. Sun's forces attacked the Longhai railway line, a stronghold on the eastern provincial border of Henan. The railway linked the cities of Kaifeng, Zhengzhou and Luoyang.

== Bibliography ==
- 中華民國國防大學編，《中國現代軍事史主要戰役表》
