= Second Battle of Mi County =

1930 battle in China

- Part of the Central Plains War
| Date | September 26, 1930 |
| Location | Mi County (modern Xinmi, Henan) |

Belligerents
| National Revolutionary Army 47th Division | Feng Yuxiang's forces |

Commanders and leaders
| Shangguan Yunxiang; Liu Mao'en; Hao Mengling | Feng Zhi'an |

The Battle of Mi County was fought at Xinmi, near Zhengzhou between forces supporting Chiang Kai-shek and those opposing him.

== Bibliography ==
- 中華民國國防大學編，《中國現代軍事史主要戰役表》
