= Encirclement campaign against the Hunan-Jiangxi Soviet =

1930 military campaign

- Part of the Chinese Civil War
Date	29 January – 24 March 1931
Location	border region of Hunan & Jiangxi provinces, China
Result	Communist victory

Belligerents
Nationalist China	Chinese Red Army

Commanders and leaders
Wang Jingyu 王金钰	?

Strength
35,000	2,000

Casualties and losses
3,500	?

The encirclement campaign against the Hunan-Jiangxi Soviet was an encirclement campaign launched by the Nationalist government against the Hunan-Jiangxi Soviet against the Chinese Soviet Republic. The Chinese Red Army successfully defended the Soviet against the Nationalist attacks from January 29 to March 24, 1931.

== First stage ==
In December 1930, the Chinese Communist Party 16th Army stationed at the Hunan-Hubei-Jiangxi Soviet launched a preemptive strike against the Nationalist forces and annihilated an entire Nationalist regiment in Tongcheng, Hubei—just before the Nationalists could begin the first attack of their encirclement campaign against Hunan-Hubei-Jiangxi Soviet. The Nationalists had to withdraw temporarily to regroup. Reinforcement troops from other regions came to the Soviet area to avenge the defeat at Tongcheng, leaving these other regions vulnerable to Communist attacks. The Hunan-Jiangxi Soviet decided to aid the Hunan-Hubei-Jiangxi Soviet by striking the government in two fronts, in the west and in the southeast of Hunan.

From January 29 through February 9, 1931, the Eastern Hunan Chinese Red Army Independent Division succeeded in taking regions including Ling (酃) County, the town of Zixing and the town of Yongxing, and three Nationalist local security regiments guarding these towns and completely destroyed along with a regiment of the Nationalist 57th Brigade sent to reinforce these regions.

In early February, 1931, the Red 7th Army was forced to abandon its bases in Guangxi and traveled northward. The Independent Division of the Hunan-Jiangxi Soviet was tasked to link up with the 7th Army. So united, the force returned to Lianhua County. Capitalizing on their victory, the communists expanded their force and the Independent Division was renamed as the Southeastern Hunan Independent Division. With a new 2nd Regiment established, the division comprised three regiments, totaling more than 1500 troops.

Both Communist offensives in Hunan were successful. In addition to obtaining more land, weaponry, money and supplies, the Hunan-Jiangxi Soviet force also linked up with the Red 7th Army at the province's border with Guangdong. The Nationalists were forced to redeploy their troops to face these new, more urgent threats; as a result the planned offensives against the Hunan-Hubei-Jiangxi Soviet went awry.

== Order of battle ==
Kuomintang order of battle: (35,000 total):

First stage:

- Ling County Security Regiment
- Zixing Security Regiment
- Yongxing Security Regiment
- A regiment of the nationalist 57th Brigade

Second stage:

- 5th Route Army commanded by Wang Jingyu (王金钰)
  - 28th Division commanded by Gong Bingpan (公秉藩)
  - 43rd Division commanded by Guo Huazong (郭华宗)
  - 47th Division commanded by Shangguan Yunxiang
  - 54th Division commanded by Hao Mengling
  - 77th Division commanded by Luo Lin (罗霖)

Communist order of battle (1,500 total):

First stage:

- Eastern Hunan Chinese Red Army Independent Division
  - 1st Regiment
  - 2nd Regiment

Second stage:

- Southeastern Hunan Independent Division
  - 1st Regiment
  - 2nd Regiment
  - 3rd Regiment

== Second stage ==
In March, 1931, nationalists were mobilized for the planned second encirclement campaign against Jiangxi Soviet. The nationalist 5th Route Army deployed was en route to Jiangxi Soviet, and was tasked to first destroy the Hunan-Jiangxi Soviet on its way when the situation permitted. The nationalist 5th Route Army begun their push toward Ji'an, Jishui, and Yongfeng County from Pingxiang and Yichun. The Communist high command of the 1st Front Army of the Chinese Red Army of the Jiangxi Soviet ordered the local Communist force of the Hunan-Jiangxi Soviet to launch a preemptive strike against the nationalist 5th Route Army in order to delay its deployment against the Jiangxi Soviet.

The communist Southeastern Huan Independent Division guarding the Hunan-Jiangxi Soviet deployed its 1st Regiment and the 2nd Regiment to strike Pingxiang and Yichun, Jiangxi, and its 3rd Regiment was ordered to southeastern Hunan to join up with the Chinese Red Army 7th Army from Guangxi, which by then had reached the border region of Guangdong and Hunan provinces. The communist preemptive surprise attack had successfully disrupted and halted the nationalist encirclement campaign against the Hunan-Jiangxi, and also slowed the nationalist 5th Route Army in its deployment against the Jiangxi Soviet.

On March 14, 1931, the 3rd Regiment of the communist Southeastern Huan Independent Division successfully linked up with the vanguard of the Chinese Red Army 7th Army in the region of Shiduwei (十都圩) in Bi (鄙) County and begun their return journey. On March 24, 1931, the communists ambushed and destroyed an entire regiment of the nationalist 19th Division, and this last battle of the encirclement campaign forced the nationalists to stop their offensives completely to withdraw and regroup. Meantime, the communists did the same by returning to Lianhua County. The Communist Southeastern Hunan Independent Division and the 58th Regiment of the Chinese Red Army 7th Army subsequently moved eastward to the region to the east of Yongyang (永阳), and joined the 175th Regiment of the Chinese Red Army 20th Army in the local region.

== Reprieve ==
Although the Nationalist 5th Route Army was ready later for another round of offensives after resting and regrouping, the nationalist high command had a different idea. The nationalist high command reasoned that its 5th Route Army was better deployed for another siege of the central communist base area instead of further encirclement of the Hunan-Jiangxi Soviet. This was because if the central leadership in the Jiangxi-Fujian Soviet was destroyed, the smaller Hunan-Jiangxi Soviet was estimated as not being able to last for long; thus, it was not worth wasting the valuable troops to be tied down on smaller local communist bases. Accordingly, the Nationalist 5th Route Army was ordered away to complete its deployment for its original purpose against their main target, and the Hunan-Jiangxi Soviet was left alone for the time being.

== Evacuation ==
The Southeastern Hunan Independent Division, by 1934 renamed the Sixth Army Group, were ordered to evacuate the Soviet in August of that year and to march to the Hunan-Hubei-Sichuan-Guizhou Soviet recently established by He Long's Second Army Group. They reached the refuge in October and united there to form the Second Red Front Army. Thus the encirclement campaign against Hunan-Jiangxi Soviet is linked to the encirclement campaign against the Hunan-Hubei-Sichuan-Guizhou Soviet.

== See also ==
- Outline of the Chinese Civil War
- National Revolutionary Army
- History of the People's Liberation Army
