= Battle of Shangcai (1930) =

- Part of the Central Plains War
Date	June 16, 1930
Location	Shangcai, Henan
Result	National Revolutionary Army

Belligerents
National Revolutionary Army 47th Division	Anti-Chiang coalition

Commanders and leaders
Shangguan Yunxiang	Feng Yuxiang

The Battle of Shangcai was fought between the National Revolutionary Army and a coalition opposing Chiang Kai-shek. Both sides were part of the Kuomintang.

Shangcai, then known as Guide, was subject to attack as part of Feng Yuxiang's drive on Xuchang. Feng's cavalry, under Zheng Dazhang, attacked the airfield at Guide, destroying a number of aircraft. At this time Chiang Kai-shek, happened to be visiting Guide to review operations in the area and was less than 2 miles (3.2 km) away and vulnerable to capture, having only a guard of 200 men with him. He escaped and launched a counter attack in late June.

== Bibliography ==
- 中華民國國防大學編，《中國現代軍事史主要戰役表》
