= Deng Fa =

Chinese Communist Party politician

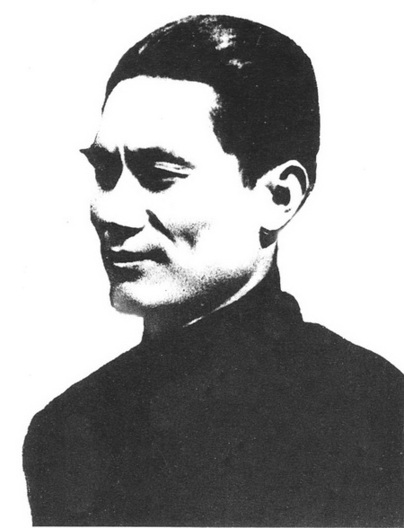

Deng Yuanzhao or Deng Fa (simplified Chinese: 邓发; traditional Chinese: 鄧發; pinyin: Dèng Fā; Jyutping: Dang6 Faat3) (March 7, 1906 – April 8, 1946) was an early leader of the Chinese Communist Party. He was born in Yuncheng District, Yunfu, Guangdong, and participated in the Canton–Hong Kong strike and the Guangzhou Uprising in his youth. He later engaged in underground work in Guangzhou and Hong Kong for the CCP, and become Party Committee Secretary of Guangzhou and Hong Kong and head of the Organisation Department in Guangdong.

After 1931, he was active in the Jiangxi Soviet and worked as the Party Committee Secretary of Fujian, and head of the State Political Security Bureau. He later assisted in the war, becoming the Political Director of the Shaan-Gan Army's 3rd Column, in charge of the secret police. His handling of the position earned him the nickname of China's Dzerzhinsky; he was present in the Long March. During the Second Sino-Japanese War, he was an alternate Politburo member, but by the Zunyi Conference he had already lost influence and made many enemies due to his campaigns.

Due to this, he was appointed representative of the CCP to Xinjiang, far from the center of power, and among other positions, became the fifth president of the Party School of the Central Committee of the Chinese Communist Party, the highest training center for party workers and leaders. Deng served as principal from 1939 to 1943, although from 1941 his position was only nominal, with Peng Zhen in charge of managing the school. In March 1943 he was dismissed from this position and started serving as nominal secretary of the Mass Movement Work Committee. He died in a plane crash in 1946, along with other senior Communist leaders including Ye Ting, Bo Gu, and Wang Ruofei.

Party political offices
Preceded by Kang Sheng	President of the Central Party School; 1939–1943	Succeeded by Mao Zedong
