= Liu Zhen (politician) =

- 刘震
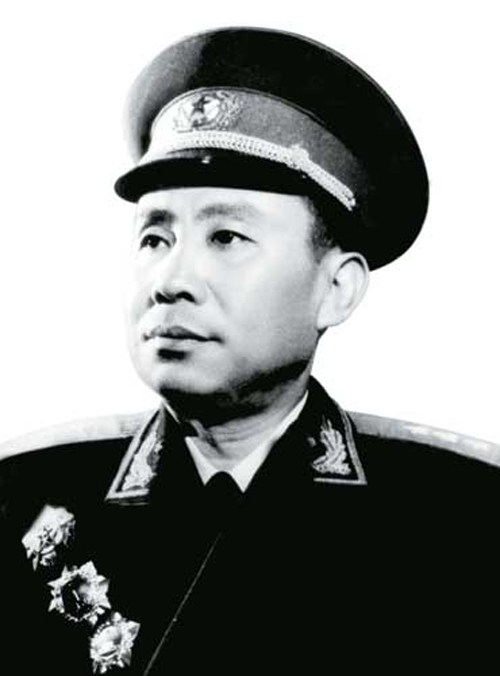

Commander of the Xinjiang Military Region
- In office July 1977 – January 1979
- Chairman: Mao Zedong

Personal details
- Born: 3 March 1915 Xiaogan County, Hubei Province, China
- Died: August 20, 1992 (aged 77) Beijing, China
- Education: Counter-Japanese Military and Political University
- Awards: Order of Bayi (First Class) Order of Independence and Freedom (First Class) Order of Liberation (China) (First Class)

Military service
- Allegiance: China
- Branch/service: People's Liberation Army; Chinese Workers' and Peasants' Red Army
- Years of service: 1930–1992
- Rank: General
- Commands: Commander of the Shenyang Military Region
- Battles/wars: Second Sino-Japanese War, Battle of Pingxingguan, Chinese Civil War, Korean War

Liu Zhen (Chinese: 刘震; pinyin: Liú Zhèn; 3 March 1915 – 20 August 1992), or Liu You'an (刘幼安), was a general in the Chinese People's Liberation Army.

== Biography ==
=== Early life ===
Tang was born into a poor peasant household in Xiaogan County, Hubei Province. As a youth, he joined the Chinese Workers' and Peasants' Red Army in 1930. He participated in guerrilla warfare against Nationalist Forces during the 3rd Encirclement Campaign. He joined the Chinese Communist Party in August 1932. In 1933, he was transferred into the 25th Red Army. As the political commissar for the 224th Regiment of the 75th Division of the Army, he participated in the assault of Changlinggang and attacking Taihu County.

Following the Long March in November 1933, he was appointed as the joint political commissar (with Han Xianchu) for the 225th Regiment. The regiment scored various victories and Tang suffered multiple wounds during battle. In 1936 he was enrolled into the Counter-Japanese Military and Political University and later made the political commissar for the 75th Division.

=== During the Second Sino-Japanese War ===
Following the outbreak of war, the 75th Division was reorganized to become part of the 115th Division in the Eighth Route Army, participating in the Battle of Pingxingguan. Tang was also appointed as the Director of the Division's Political Department. He led forces to flank Japanese forces who were encroached in Taiyuan.

Following the New Fourth Army Incident, Tang was named the Commander of the 10th Brigade under the reformed Fourth Army. The Brigade would later be reorganized into the 3rd Division. In September 1942 he held various commands, such as being the Huaihai Army Division Commander, deputy secretary of the CPC Northern Region, Huaihai prefecture's party secretary. He participated in counter-offensives against the Imperial Japanese Army in Northern China.

=== Formation of the PRC ===
After the founding of the People's Republic of China, he participated in the Guangxi Campaign. During the Korean War, he was appointed Air Force Commander of the Chinese People's Volunteers.
