= Second United Front =

1936–47 alliance between the Chinese Communist Party and the Kuomintang

- 第二次國共合作
- Leaders: Chiang Kai-shek; Mao Zedong
- Dates active: December 24, 1936 – March 7, 1947
- Merger of: Kuomintang; Chinese Communist Party
- Country: China
- Allegiance: (Republic of China (1912–1949)) Nationalist government
- Headquarters: Chongqing, Yan'an
- Ideology: Chinese nationalism Anti-fascism (Note: Chiang Kai-shek, who was the leader of Kuomintang, was pointed out by some critics as having a fascist element. Jay Taylor, argue that Chiang's ideology does not espouse the general ideology of fascism despite his growing sympathies with fascist ideas in the 1930s. Chiang repeatedly attacked his enemies such as the Empire of Japan as fascistic and ultra-militaristic; he also declared his opposition to the fascist ideology in the 1940s. The Sino-German relationship also rapidly deteriorated as Germany failed to pursue a détente between China and Japan, which led to the outbreak of the Second Sino-Japanese War. China later declared war on fascist countries, including Germany, Italy, and Japan, as part of the Declarations of war during World War II and Chiang became the most powerful "anti-fascist" leader in Asia.)
- Political position: Big tent
- Part of: United Nations

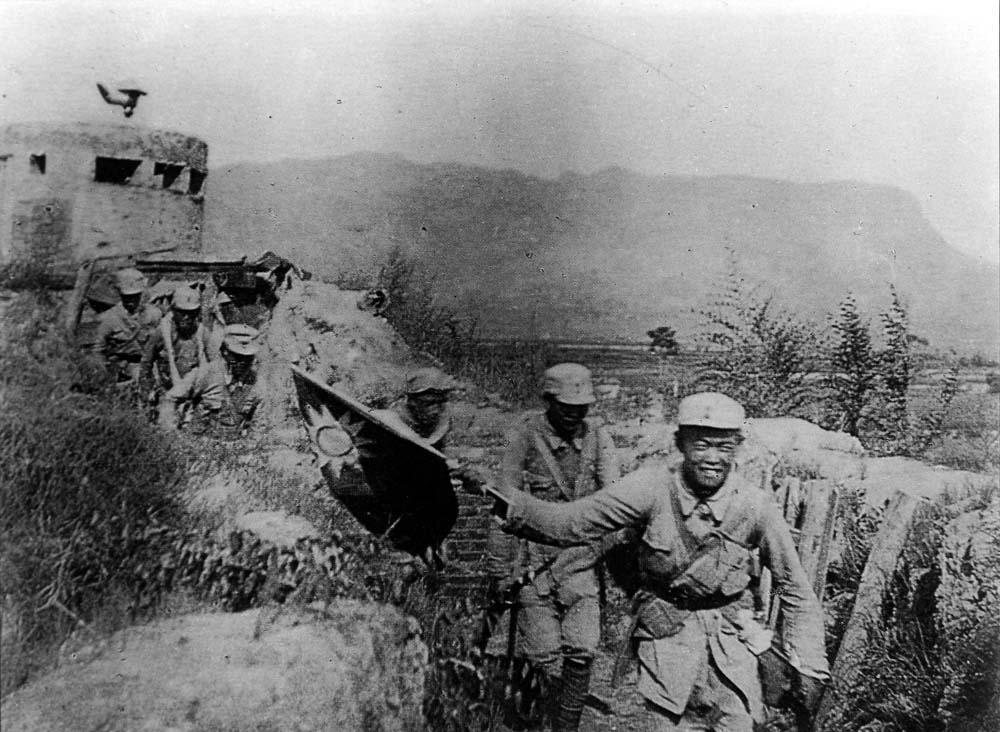
A Communist soldier waving the Nationalists' flag of the Republic of China after a victorious battle against the Japanese during the Second Sino-Japanese War

The Second United Front (traditional Chinese: 第二次國共合作; simplified Chinese: 第二次国共合作; pinyin: dì èr cì guógòng hézuò; lit. 'Second Nationalist-Communist Cooperation') was the alliance between the ruling Kuomintang (KMT) and the Chinese Communist Party (CCP) to resist the Empire of Japan's invasion of China during the Second Sino-Japanese War, which suspended the Chinese Civil War from 1937 to 1945. In practice, the Second United Front functioned more as a non-aggression pact than a military alliance.

== Background ==
In late 1935, Chiang Kai-shek started secret negotiations with the Soviet Union in the hopes of gaining material assistance if war broke out between China and Japan. As a precondition for an agreement, the Soviet Union wanted Chiang to negotiate a ceasefire with the CCP. Although reluctant to engage with a group he saw as rebels, Chiang cautiously sought to establish contact with the CCP. The CCP Central Committee told them that the CCP was interested in a united anti-Japanese army under a government of national defense. Given the wide gap between the CCP and KMT's conditions, further negotiations did not take place during the first half of 1936.

Meanwhile, the CCP opened up separate negotiations with the Nationalist forces besieging them in northwest China. They managed to sign secret ceasefire agreements with Zhang Xueliang, leader of the Northeastern Army, and Yang Hucheng, leader of the Northwestern Army. These generals were frustrated that Chiang was prioritizing Civil War over resistance to Japan. Yan Xishan, another neighboring warlord, also signed a secret agreement with the CCP, although he was not as closely aligned with them as Zhang or Yang. The members of this northwestern alliance were united by their desire to resist Japan, but they differed over the details of how this could best be accomplished. The CCP supported a plan to use Soviet support to take over Shaanxi, Gansu, Ningxia, Qinghai, and Xinjiang and turn northwest China into a base under Zhang's command to resist Japan and oppose Chiang. Zhang, Yang, and Yan were still committed to convincing Chiang to lead the anti-Japanese resistance. As they continued to negotiate, they kept their alliance secret and even staged fake military battles to allay the suspicions of the Nanjing government.

Negotiations between Chiang and the CCP began in earnest in late 1936. Chiang continued to try to resolve the civil war militarily; he continued to consider a negotiated settlement with the CCP to be a last resort. He was encouraged by the results of the Ningxia campaign in mid-to-late October. In that campaign, the Second and Fourth Corps of the Red Army marched north to pick up supplies dropped in Mongolia by the Soviet Union, but found themselves trapped on the wrong side of the Yellow River. They were cut to pieces by the Hui cavalry allied with the Nationalists. Chiang began making preparations for a sixth encirclement campaign, and instructed Zhang and Yang to participate. In early November, Chen Lifu presented Pan Hannian with a set of extremely harsh conditions for a deal. (Note: The terms called for, among other things, reducing the Red Army to 3,000 men and sending all of its senior officers into exile.) Pan balked, calling them "conditions for surrender". In late November, Chiang ordered the Northeastern Army and forces from the central Nationalist Army, Hu Zongnan's Right Route Army, to attack towards the CCP capital at Bao'an. At the resulting Battle of Shanchengbao, the Northeastern Army withheld most of its forces from the attack. This allowed the Red Army to ambush and nearly wipe out Hu's 78th regiment. This reversed the diplomatic situation: Chen Lifu moderated his conditions, but the CCP recalled Pan Hannian from Nanjing on December 10.

In late 1936, Zhang Xueliang decided that his repeated attempts to persuade Chiang to create a united front with the CCP were not going to be enough. To Zhang, Chiang appeared dead-set on continuing the Civil War even as the threat of Japanese invasion loomed ever larger. Following Yang Hucheng's advice, he decided to resort to drastic measures. On December 12, 1936, the disgruntled Zhang and Yang conspired to kidnap Chiang and force him into a truce with the CCP. The incident became known as the Xi'an Incident. Both parties suspended fighting to form a Second United Front to focus their energies and fight the Japanese.

== Cooperation during the Second Sino-Japanese War ==
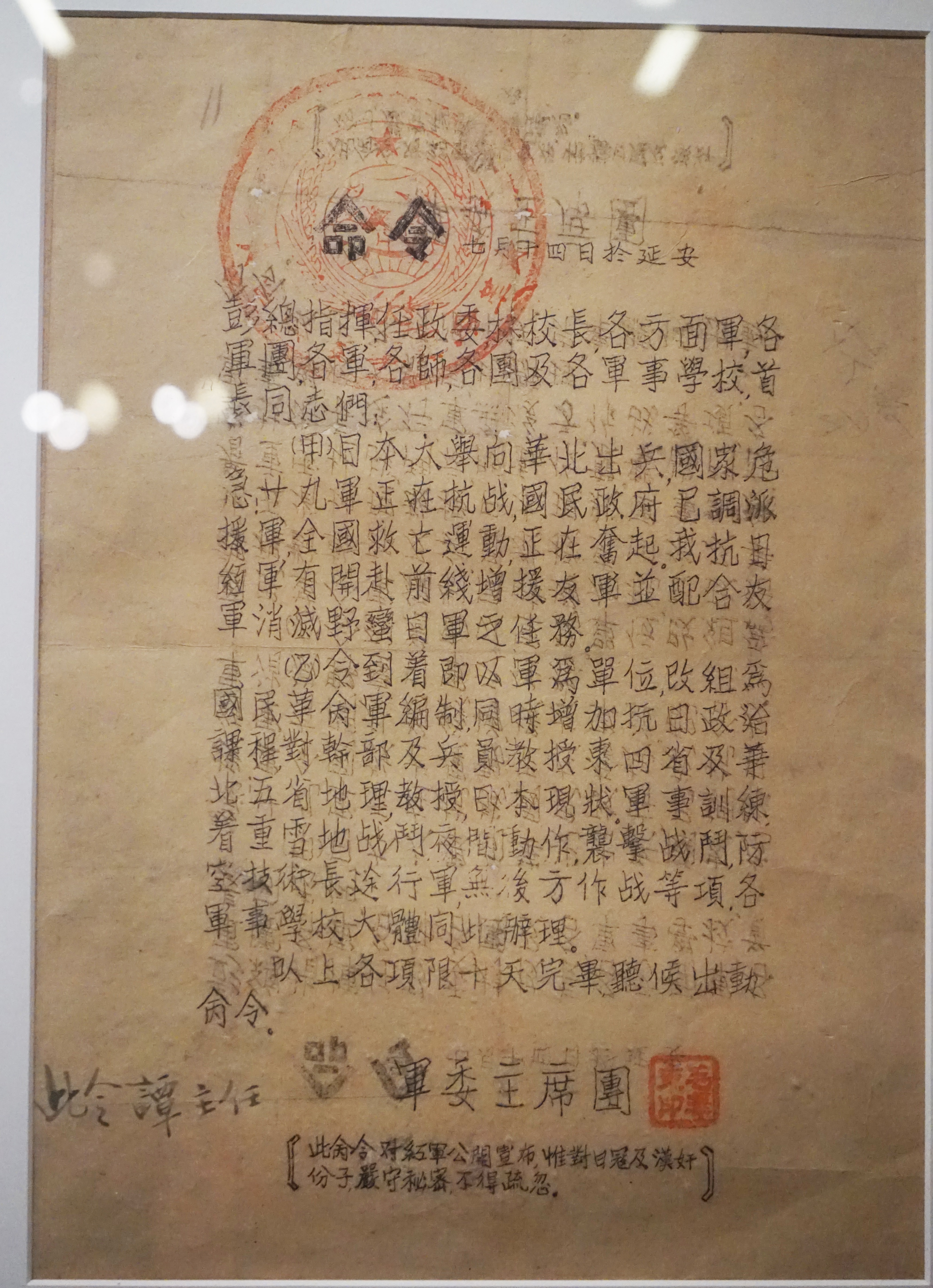
In July 1937, the Presidium of the Central Military Commission issued an order for the Red Army to reorganize into the National Revolutionary Army and stand by for the anti-Japanese front line.

As a result of the Second United Front, the Red Army was reorganized into the Eighth Route Army and the CCP forces south of the Yangzi River was organized into the New Fourth Army. These were placed under the command of the National Revolutionary Army. The CCP agreed to accept the leadership of Chiang Kai-shek, and began to receive some financial support from the central government run by KMT. In agreement with KMT Shaan-Gan-Ning Border Region and Jin-Cha-Ji Border Region were created. They were controlled by the CCP.

CCP leaders, including Mao Zedong, were elected to the newly-created People's Political Council. CCP intellectuals including Guo Moruo were recruited into the Political Department of the Military Affairs Commission.

Among the points of negotiation in the Second United Front was the ability of the CCP to openly publish newspapers and periodicals in KMT areas. In late August 1937, Zhou Enlai and KMT Central Publicity Department head Shao Lizi agreed that the newspapers Xinhua Daily and Chuin Chung Weekly would be published in these areas.

After the commencement of full-scale war between China and Japan, CCP forces fought in alliance with the KMT forces during the Battle of Taiyuan, and the high point of their cooperation came in 1938 during the Battle of Wuhan.

Within the CCP, positions differed regarding how closely it should work with the Nationalists in the Second United Front. Mao's view was that the CCP should be mostly independent and autonomous. Wang Ming, Mao's major rival of the time, favored closer cooperation and "everything through the united front."

The CCP submission to the chain of command of the National Revolutionary Army was in name only. The CCP acted independently. The level of actual coordination between the CCP and KMT during the Second Sino-Japanese War was minimal.

== Breakdown and aftermath ==
In the midst of the Second United Front, the CCP and the Kuomintang were still vying for territorial advantage in "Free China" (i.e. those areas not occupied by the Japanese or ruled by puppet governments). In 1938, Mao argued that the CCP should trade space for time vis-a-vis the Japanese and leave the burden of the fighting to the Nationalists. The uneasy alliance began to break down by late 1938. The CCP intensified its efforts to expand their military strength through absorbing Chinese guerrilla forces behind enemy Japanese lines. In an instance of a clash later reported in Chiang Kai-Shek's diary, the Red Army led by He Long attacked and wiped out a brigade of Chinese militia led by Chang Yin-wu in Hebei in June, 1939.

In December 1940, Chiang Kai-shek demanded that the CCP's New Fourth Army evacuate Anhui and Jiangsu Provinces. The reasons for the subsequent ambush by the Nationalists against the CCP are not entirely clear, with both the Kuomintang and the CCP blaming the other for having attacked the other first. It seems that in response to the Kuomintang order to evacuate Anhui and Jiangsu, the CCP commanders only agreed to move the New Fourth Army troops in Southern Anhui (Wannan) to the northern shore of the Yangtze River. Once in Southern Anhui, CCP forces were ambushed and defeated by Nationalist troops in January 1941. This clash, which would be known as the New Fourth Army Incident, weakened but did not end the CCP position in Central China and effectively ended any substantive co-operation between the Nationalists and the CCP and both sides concentrated on jockeying for position in the inevitable Civil War. It also ended the Second United Front formed earlier to fight the Japanese.

Afterwards, within the Japanese occupied provinces and behind enemy lines the KMT and CCP forces carried on warfare with each other, with the CCP eventually destroying or absorbing the KMT partisan forces or driving them into the Collaborationist Chinese Army. The CCP under the leadership of Mao Zedong also began to focus most of their energy on building up their sphere of influence wherever opportunities were presented, mainly through rural mass organizations, administrative, land and tax reform measures favoring poor peasants; while the KMT allocated many divisions of its regular army to carry out military blockade of the CCP areas in an attempt to neutralize the spread of their influence until the end of the Second Sino-Japanese War.

=== After 1945 ===
After the Second Sino-Japanese War, Chiang Kai-shek and Mao Zedong attempted to engage in peace talks. This effort failed and by 1946 the KMT and the CCP were engaged in all-out civil war. The CCP were able to obtain seized Imperial Japanese Army weapons in the Northeast – with Soviet acquiescence – and took the opportunity to engage the already weakened KMT. In October 1949, Mao proclaimed the People's Republic of China, while Chiang retreated to the island of Taiwan.

== See also ==
- Outline of the Chinese Civil War
- Timeline of the Chinese Civil War
- United front (People's Republic of China)
- United front in Taiwan
- United front in Hong Kong
