= Tao Yong =

Chinese military officer

Vice Admiral Tao Yong
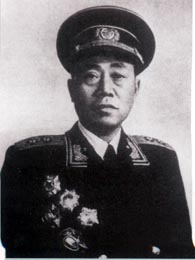

Personal details
- Born: Zhang Daoyong; 21 January 1913 Huoqiu, Anhui, Republic of China
- Died: January 21, 1967 (aged 54) Shanghai, People's Republic of China
- Party: Chinese Communist Party
- Spouse: Zhu Lan

Military service
- Branch/service: People's Liberation Army Navy
- Rank: Vice Admiral
- Battles/wars: Second Sino-Japanese War; Chinese Civil War; Korean War

Tao Yong (Chinese: 陶勇; 21 January 1913 - 21 January 1967) was a Chinese military leader. He served as Deputy Commander of the People's Liberation Army Navy (PLAN) and Vice Admiral of the People's Liberation Army Navy.

== Early life ==
Tao Yong, originally Zhang Daoyong (Chinese: 张道庸), was born into a peasant family in Huoqiu County, Anhui Province on 21 January 1913.

== Career ==
=== First Chinese Civil War ===
In February 1929, Zhang joined Communist Youth League and in April, he went to Shangcheng County, Henan Province to join the guerrillas. He was appointed commander of the company of Division 32 of the Eleventh Red Army. In 1931, Zhang was appointed leader of the security team of the security bureau in the Hubei, Henan and Anhui Areas. In June Zhang was appointed commander of the second company and deputy commander of the first battalion of Division 35, Regiment 35. In May 1932, Zhang joined the Chinese Communist Party and attended many anti-encirclement campaigns in the Eyuwan Soviet Area.

Zhang followed the Fourth Red Army marching west and arrived in the Sichang area, after which, he was appointed commander of the Second Battalion, Regiment 28, Division 10. Zhang led his battalion through many battles in the Chuangshan Soviet Area. In 1935, Zhang joined the Long March and was appointed commander of the Training Regiment of the Ninth Red Army. In September 1936, Zhang followed the headquarters of the Fourth Red Army and crossed the Yellow River as a member of the West-Road Army. In March 1937, after the failure of the West-Road Army, Zhang was arrested. The Central Committee rescued Zhang and helped him get back to Yan'an to study at the Military and Political University of Resistance Against Japan.

=== Second Sino-Japanese War ===
After the outbreak of the Second Sino-Japanese War, Tao was appointed deputy commander of the first detachment of the Fourth Red Army. He was then appointed commander of the Fourth Regiment. In September 1939, Lu Sheng and Tao led the main force of the Fourth Regiment across the Yangtze River and formed the detachment of Suzhou and Anhui Area, which created a guerrilla base between Yangzhou and Tianchang County, Anhui Province. Chen Yi changed Tao's name to Tao Yong. In July 1940, Tao was appointed commander of the third troop of the headquarters of the New Fourth Army and took part in Huangqiao Battle.

In January 1941, after the Southern Anhui Incident, the New Fourth Army was reorganized and Tao was appointed commander of the third bridge of the first regiment. In March 1942, Tao was appointed division commander of the Fourth Army of the military region of the middle Suzhou area. They participated in anti-Japanese battles in Qing County. In 1944, Tao took part in Cheqiao Battle. At the end of the year, Tao led his division across the Yangtze and was appointed commander and political commissar of the third column of the military region of Suzhou and Zhejiang area. In 1945, Tao participated in the Tianmushan Battle.

=== Second Chinese Civil War ===
In November 1945, Tao reorganized his division into the Eighth Colum of the Field Army. Tao commanded the Eighth Colum and led it to attack Gaoyou where he forced Japanese armies to give in. In June 1946, Tao was appointed deputy commander of the First Regiment of the Field Army. Tao participated in the battle in middle Suzhou and the battle in Lianshui. In September 1946, Tao led his regiment to southern Shandong Province to take part in Lunan Battle. With the help of other regiments, they annihilated the first column and the twenty-sixth regiment of the National Revolutionary Army (NRA). They attacked Zaozhuang County, annihilating Regiment 51 and capturing more than 7700 soldiers and their commander Zhou Yuying.

In January 1947, the first regiment was reorganized into the fourth regiment of the Field Army of Eastern China and Tao was appointed commander. Wang Jicheng was appointed political commissar, leading the tenth, eleventh and twelfth regiments, with more than 30,000 soldiers. At the end of February, the Fourth Column took part in Laiwu Battle and annihilated the NRA's Li Xianzhou Group. At the beginning of April, Tao led his regiment to Shandong Province. After more than a month's fighting, they annihilated the NRA's 74th regiment in Menglianggu Area. After three days of fighting, they annihilated the 74th regiment. At the end of June, Tao led his regiment to fight in Shandong Province. In August, he led the eleventh and twelfth regiments to southwestern Shandong Province and joined the West Troop. In November, they took part in the sabotage battle in Longhai Road and killed more than 3700 cavalry enemies in Guanting County.

In June 1948, Tao participated in the Yudong Battle, annihilating Qv Shounian's troops. In September, they took part in Jinan Battle. In November they participated in Huaihai Battle. Tao joined Huang Baitao's troop and then the Surrounding-Du Yuming's troop. He captured Du Yuming alive. In February 1949, the Fourth Column was renamed the 23rd Army of the People's Liberation Army and Tao was appointed commander (Lu Sheng was appointed as political commissar, leading the 67th, 68th and 69th regiments). On 21 April, the 23rd Army took part in the Crossing-River Battle, breaking the NRA defence between Zhenjiang and Jiangyin Area, and cutting the Huning Railway and Ninghang Road. In May, Tao led his regiments to attack Hangzhou and Shanghai.

=== People's Republic of China ===
In October 1950, Tao was appointed Deputy Commander of the Ninth Troop of the People's Volunteer Army and took part in the Korean War. He conducted the Ninth Troop at Changjing Lake (Chosin Reservoir). In 1951, Tao took part in the fifth battle（Chinese spring offensive） in the Korean War, after which he temporarily acted as commander and political commissioner, winning the First Class flag medal, and Liberation and Independence medal in North Korea. In November 1952, Tao was appointed commander of the Navy Force of the East China Military Area Command, conducting many navy battles against the NAR. In 1955, Tao was appointed commander of the East China Sea Fleet and became a Lieutenant General of the People's Liberation Army. Tao won the first-class Eight-One Medal, Independence and Liberation Medal and the first-class Liberation Medal. Tao was appointed Deputy Commander of the Navy Force. In November 1963, Tao was appointed Deputy Commander of the Nanjing Military Region.

Tao Yong died during Cultural Revolution under contentious circumstances. In early 1967, Tao became ill and Xu Shiyou suggested that he go to Nanjing for treatment, but Tao refused. On the morning of 21 January 1967, Tao and Shanghai Garrison commander Liao Zhengguo discussed rescuing Shanghai party secretary Chen Pixian, who had recently been deposed by the January Storm. Later that day, Tao was found dead in the water well in the back garden of the guesthouse of the East Sea Fleet. The cause of Tao's death remains uncertain. According to an attempted rescuer, he reported to commissar of the East Sea Fleet Liu Haotian twice that "Commander Tao is dead despite efforts to rescue him, please come to the scene and see." However, Liu Haotian replied curtly, "He is dead so he is dead, await orders from above.", then never showed up to the scene. Soon after Tao's death, Liu Haotian declared based on his personal opinion, though without evidence, that the Navy had classified him as a "traitor" and that he "committing suicide for fear of punishment". In September, Tao's wife Zhu Lan was killed. In 1977, the Central Military Commission redressed the grievances done to Tao Yong and his wife.
