= 1946 Yan'an United States Air Force C-47 crash =

Aviation incident in Shanxi, China

C-47B-1-DL
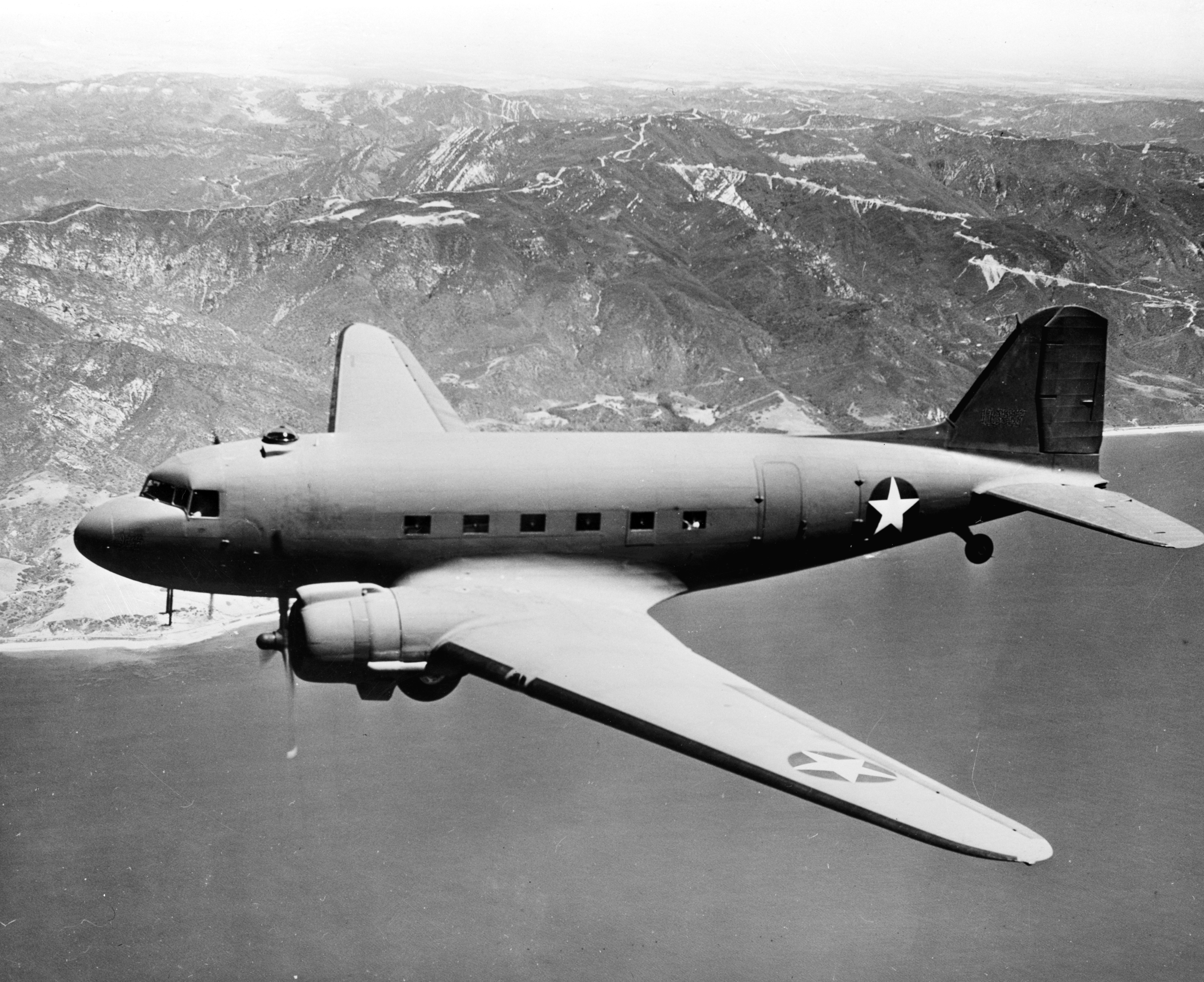
- A C-47 similar to the accident aircraft

Accident
- Date: 8 April 1946
- Summary: Controlled flight into terrain
- Site: Heicha Mountain, Xing County, Shanxi, China

Aircraft
- Aircraft type: DC-3
- Operator: United States Army Air Forces
- Flight origin: Chongqing
- Stopover: Xi'an
- Destination: Yan'an
- Occupants: 17
- Passengers: 13
- Crew: 4
- Fatalities: 17
- Survivors: 0

The 1946 United States Air Force C-47 crash, known in China as the April 8 Incident, was the crash of US Army Air Force C-47B-1-DL (registration 43–16360) from Chongqing to Yan'an that struck a mountain in Shanxi, China, killing all four crew members and 13 passengers, including several top Communist Chinese leaders.

== Accident ==
The C-47 flight that took off from Chongqing en route to Yan'an had thirteen passengers - all members of the CCP delegation at Chongqing - and the four US military personnel who operated the flight. Among those on the flight were notable Communist Party leaders, including General Ye Ting; General Secretary of the Chinese Communist Party Qin Bangxian, also known as Bo Gu; former-President of the Central Party School Deng Fa; and Communist Party Central Committee Member Wang Ruofei. Accompanying Ye Ting on the flight were his wife, daughter, son and nanny. According to Wise's father, the aircrafted landed at Xi'an to refuel before ascending once more to fly to Yan'an. While starting to descend the aircraft crashed into the Heicha Mountains (Mt. Black Tea), located 140 mi (120 nmi; 230 km) northeast of Yan'an in Shaanxi Province, killing all 17 people on board

== Aftermath ==
The crash forced the CCP to reorganize their negotiating delegation, becoming known, in China, as the "April 8 Incident."
