= Tan Xilin =

People's Liberation Army general

- 谭希林
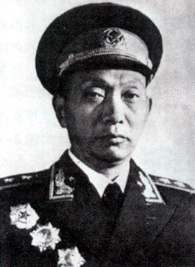
- Born: 12 March 1908; Changsha, Hunan, Qing dynasty
- Died: 11 February 1970 (aged 61)
- Military career
- Allegiance: China
- Branch: People's Liberation Army Ground Force
- Service years: 1927-1970
- Rank: Lieutenant general (Zhong jiang)
- Conflicts: Sino-Japanese War; Chinese Civil War; Nanchang Uprising; Long March; Battle of Yongjiazhen

Tan Xilin (Chinese: 谭希林; pinyin: Tán Xīlín; March 12, 1908 – February 11, 1970) was a division commander in the New Fourth Army and later a lieutenant general of the Chinese People's Liberation Army. He was born in Changsha, Hunan. He joined the Chinese Communist Party in 1927 and participated in the Nanchang Uprising and the Jiangxi Soviet. He commanded an engineering detachment during the Long March. After fighting in the Chinese Communist Revolution, he became the Chinese ambassador to Czechoslovakia (1950–1954).
