= Xiang Ying =

Chinese general (1895–1941)

- 项英
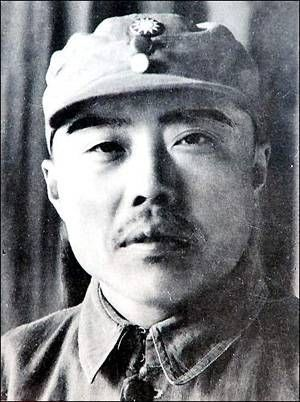
- Born: c. 1895; Wuchang, Hubei, Qing China
- Died: 1941 (aged 45–46); Maolin, Jing County, Anhui Province
- Cause of death: Assassination
- Burial place: Nanjing
- Military career
- Allegiance: Chinese Communist Party
- Branch: New Fourth Army
- Conflicts: Chinese Civil War; Second Sino-Japanese War

Xiang Ying (simplified Chinese: 项英; traditional Chinese: 項英; pinyin: Xiàng Yīng; Wade–Giles: Hsiang Ying; 1895(?) – 1941) was a war-time Chinese communist leader and an early founding member of the Chinese Communist Party who reached the rank of political chief of staff of the New Fourth Army during World War II until his assassination by a member of his staff in 1941 during the Sino-Japanese War.

== Biography ==
Initially a labor organizer, he joined the Chinese Communist Party (CCP) in Wuhan in 1921. He continued to work in labour actions and helped lead the famous Beijing–Hankou railway workers' strike in February 1923. He went on to serve in the CCP political and military leadership during the civil war between the Nationalists (Kuomintang) and the CCP. He held high office during the CCP's Jiangxi Soviet period (1931–1934).

In October 1934, at the beginning of the Long March, Xiang stayed behind to fight a rearguard action that would allow the marchers to get out of the ring of surrounding Nationalist forces. The marchers, with Mao Zedong as their leader, went on to Yan'an, while Xiang remained in the Jiangxi region, coordinating guerrilla operations to harass Nationalist forces.

When the Japanese invaded in July 1937, a united front (the Second United Front) was declared between Nationalists and CCP, and Xiang's guerrillas became the nucleus of a legitimate fighting force: the New Fourth Army. This army operated behind Japanese lines, and was subject to orders coming from both the CCP leadership in Yan'an, and the Nationalist leadership, which had moved inland from Nanjing to Chongqing.

Xiang and Mao had a relationship based on mistrust and conflict; Xiang was considered the military officer Mao trusted the least. In the spring of 1939, Xiang ordered the secretary of the New Fourth Army Headquarters, Yang Fan, to investigate the activities of Jiang Qing, Mao's fiancée, better known as Madame Mao, when she had been an actress in Shanghai. The report by Yang, which was signed by Xiang, was cabled to Yan'an and explicitly stated that Mao should not marry Jiang Qing.

Contradictory orders from these groups led to confusion, and eventually the New Fourth Army incident, in which Xiang was killed in an assault on the army by the Nationalist forces in March 1941. He was killed by a member of his own staff, Liu Houzong for the gold resources of the New Fourth Army. Xiang had carried the gold on his own person in the aftermath of the incident. After Liu killed Xiang and two other officers, he absconded with the gold and surrendered to the Nationalists, who promptly accepted the gold and jailed him. He was later freed, and spent the rest of his life working at a salt shop in Xinyu under an assumed identity. In 1952, Liu was identified by Huang Yifan, deputy director of the Xinyu County Public Security Bureau and former guard in the New Fourth Army. Liu was quickly arrested, and executed for treason in August the same year.

The incident was a result of either mistrust or disobedience, or both, between the two parties that would lead to the resumption of full-scale civil war once the Japanese began a full retreat out of China's interior in the summer of 1945, prior to their surrender later that year. Some historians have argued that Xiang was the victim of the indecision of Mao Zedong. Mao's supporters argued that Xiang's misunderstanding of the potential threats posed by the Nationalists, along with his own ambitions, led to his demise.
