= New Fourth Army Memorial Hall =

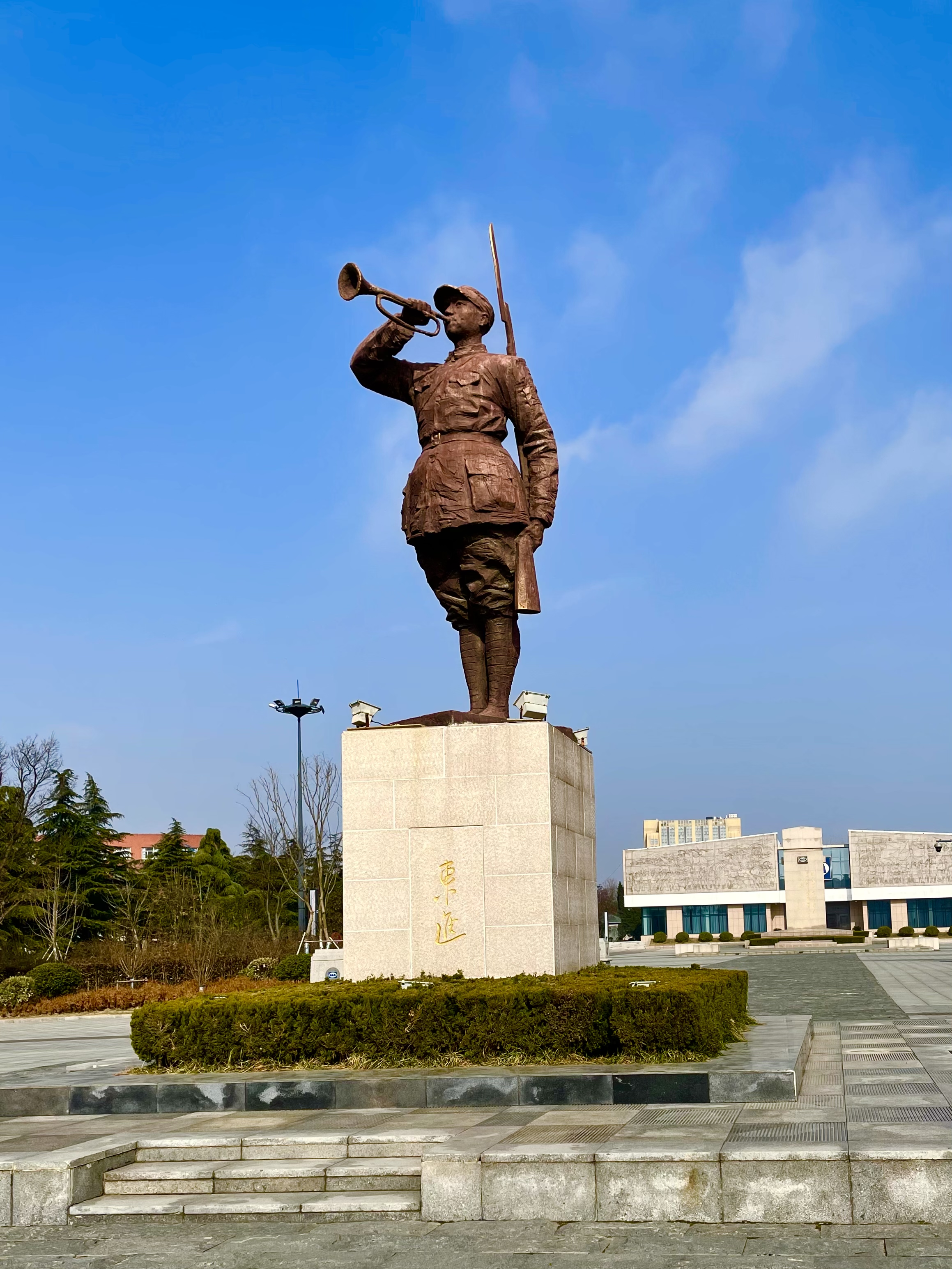
N4A Soldier Statue at the entrance of the New Fourth Army Memorial Hall

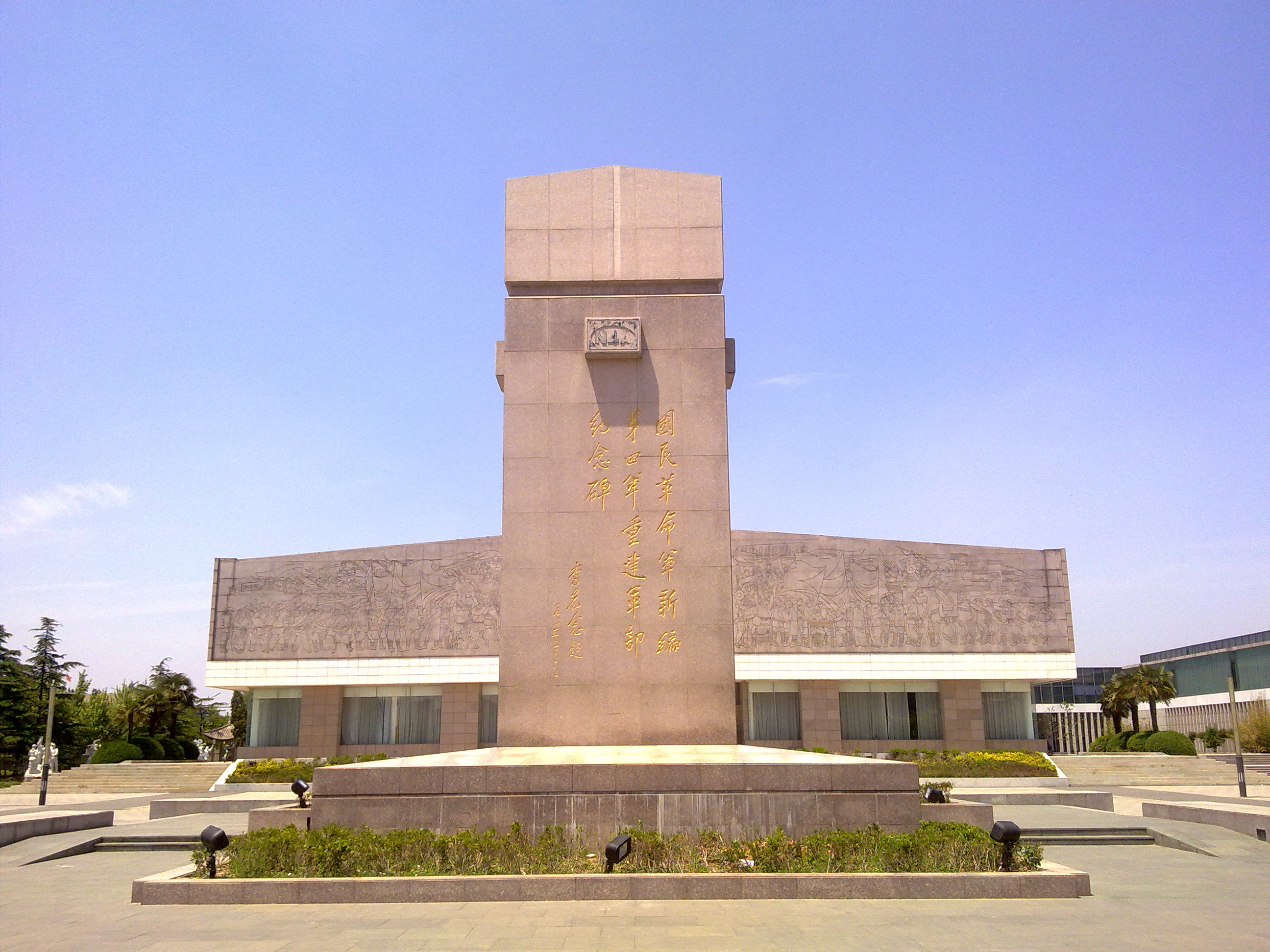
New Fourth Army（N4A）Memorial Hall, Yancheng City, Jiangsu Provence, P.R.C

The New Fourth Army Memorial Hall, full name "New Fourth Army National Revolutionary Army military memorial reconstruction", (Chinese:新四军纪念馆) is located in the east of Jianjun Road, Yancheng, Jiangsu, China. It was advanced as a State AAAA-class tourist attractions on 18 May 2011. Construction began in 1985 and was finished in September 1986. Its exhibition hall is in the modern architecture style.

There is armband pattern 'N4A', which colors blue and white, above the main entrance of the hall. And in both sides of its flag-shaped carving, it is the reflection of the historical scene where New Fourth Army joined force with the Eighth Route Army and where New fourth Army was reconstructed after the incident in Anhui. There are about 1000 pictures of Second Sino-Japanese War, historical relics and some artistic works. There is a bike with the legendary trophy named 'Manzhou'(Chinese:满洲).
