= Wang Ruofei =

Chinese Communist leader

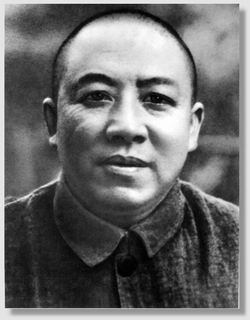
- Wang Ruofei
- Born: Wang Yunsheng; 11 October 1896; Anshun, Guizhou, China
- Died: 8 April 1946 (aged 49); Shaanxi, China
- Other name: Ivan Nemtsov
- Occupation: Chinese Communist leader

Chinese name
- Traditional Chinese: 王若飛
- Simplified Chinese: 王若飞
Transcriptions
Standard Mandarin
- Hanyu Pinyin: Wáng Ruòfēi
- Wade–Giles: Wang Jo-fei

Wang Ruofei (11 October 1896 – 8 April 1946) was a high-ranking member of the Chinese Communist Party. He studied in France in the 1920s, where he joined the Communist Party, was trained in the Soviet Union, served five years in prison on his return to China, and was killed along with several other high officials in a plane crash in 1946.

== Early life and education ==
Wang was born into a landlord family in the poverty stricken province of Guizhou, where he was raised by his uncle, Huang Qisheng. He studied for a little over a year at Waseda University in Japan, though he spent more time in independent study than in class. He and his uncle then went to France in 1919 as students on the Diligent-Work Frugal Study program, by chance on the same ship as Cai Hesen, Cai Chang, and Xiang Jingyu.

His early experience in France was highly favorable. On a spring day in 1920 he wrote in his diary:

"In the morning I went to the park to read.... The small children follow the grown-ups, dancing and singing; they are sublimely happy, taking the miseries of the world and abandoning them to the clouds... I sit on a stone bench, quietly appreciating the beautiful scenery. Is this not heaven!"

He even professed to enjoy working in a French factory as a chance to learn practical skills and learn from the factory environment as a "natural sociology class." Yet he also worried that making money for others did nothing for his self-improvement. He was indignant over the bad treatment of African workers in the factory and the laziness of the French workers and appalled at their habits of smoking and drinking.

In 1921, the Work-Study students in France were mobilized to protest the impending cut-off of their government subsidies and the fact that they would not be allowed to enroll in the newly established Sino-French Institute at Lyons. Wang sided with Zhao Shiyan and Li Lisan, who would also go on to become high CCP leaders, in organizing protests which quickly escalated into riots. Many of the protest leaders were expelled from France, and the split within the Work-Study students created a radicalized faction which Wang joined. Wang then helped to organize the Socialist Youth League, a group which was reorganized into the European branch of the newly founded Chinese Communist Party. In 1922, he joined the French Communist Party.

== Career in the Chinese Communist Party ==
In the spring of 1923 Wang was one of a group of twelve to travel to Moscow. After several years of study at the University of the Toilers of the East, he came back to China in 1925 and was elected to the Central Committee of the CCP in 1927. He was active in the party in Shanghai under Chen Duxiu, but because of his opposition to the party leadership he was not reelected. On his return to the Soviet Union he took the pseudonym Ivan Nemtsov, and in 1929 was accused of being a supporter of Leon Trotsky, Stalin's rival, and sent to work in a factory.

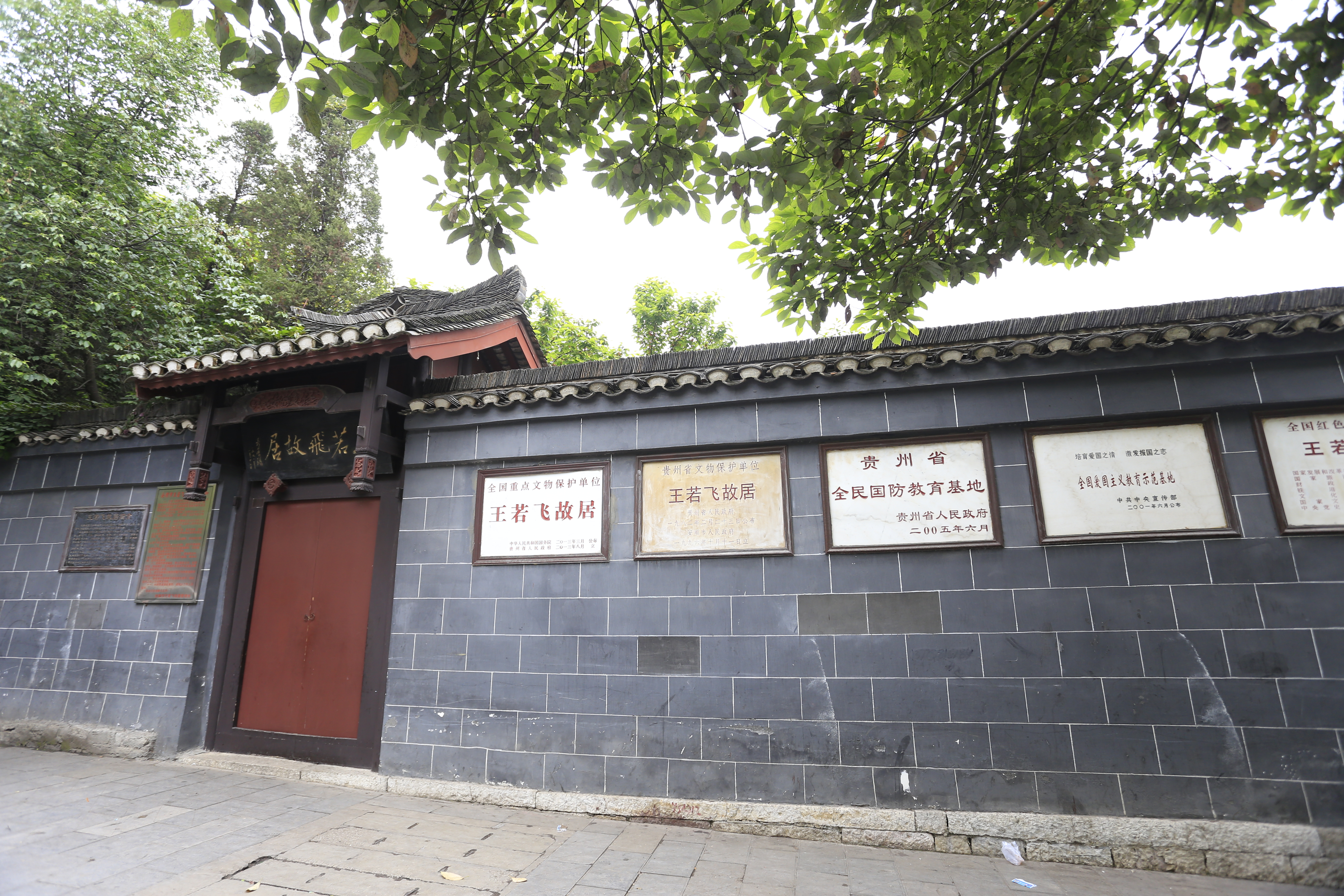
Wang Ruofei's former home in Anshun

After this three-year sojourn in the Soviet Union he returned to first join Mao in Jiangxi, then do work in Inner Mongolia, where he was arrested and transferred to Taiyuan, Shanxi. In prison Wang was viewed as a leader by other political prisoners. He was released into a form of house arrest after negotiations by Bo Yibo at the start of the Second United Front in 1937. He played a number of roles in land reform and propaganda during the war as well as serving as deputy chief-of-staff for the People's Liberation Army. In 1945, he was elected once more to the Central Committee. When the war ended in 1945, Wang accompanied Mao Zedong and Zhou Enlai to take part in negotiations with the Nationalists in Chongqing. He was killed in 1946 along with CCP leaders Bo Gu, Deng Fa, and Ye Ting, and his uncle Huang Qisheng, when their plane from Chongqing to Yan'an crashed.
