= Wannan =

Wannan 皖南
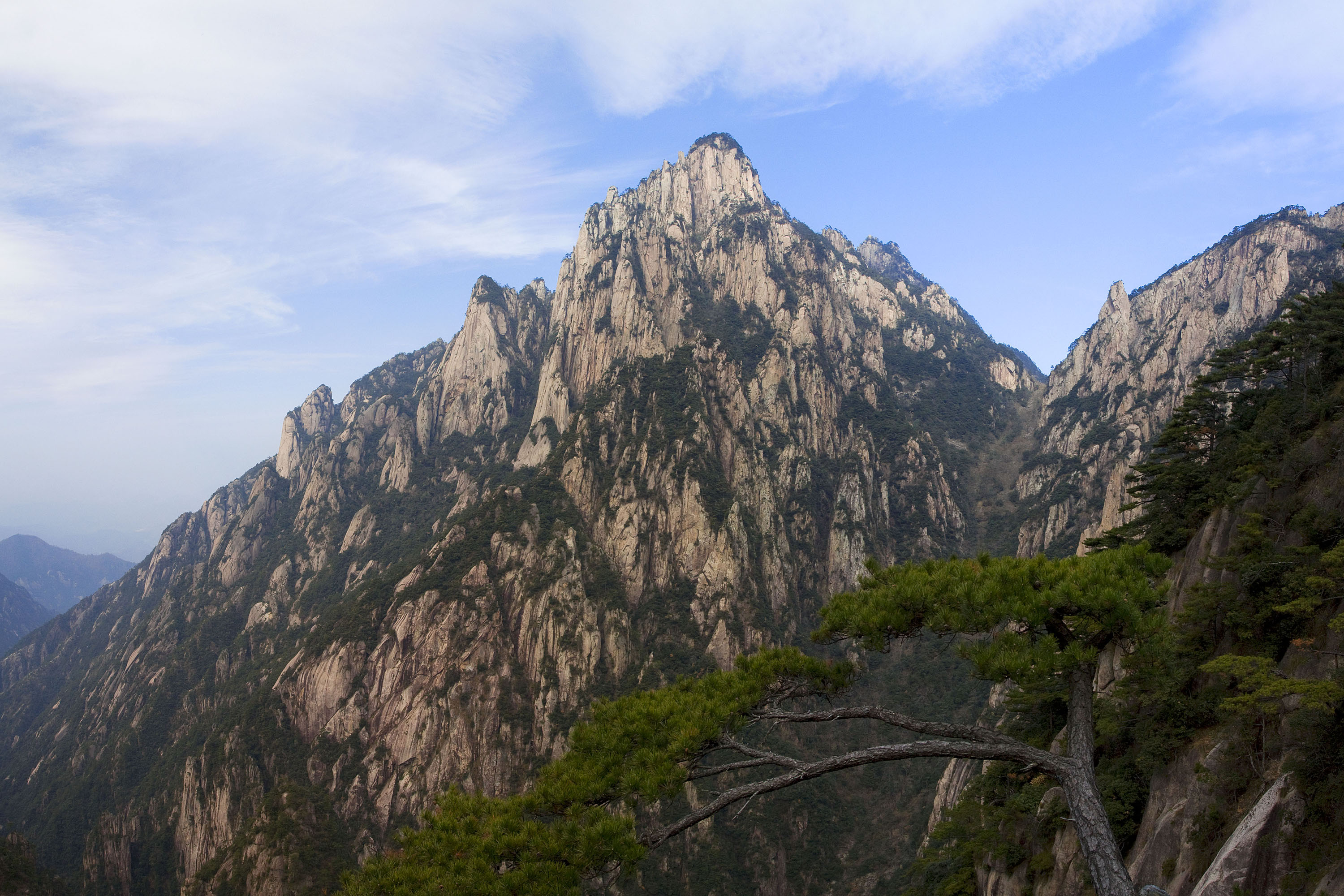
- Huangshan

- Location of Anhui in China, Wannan is the region south of the Yangtze river
- Country: China
- Province: Anhui

Wannan is a name given to the southern part of Anhui province, China, with the northern part of Anhui ptovince being called Wanbei. 'Wan' (皖) is an alternative designation for Anhui. The region includes Ma'anshan (except Hanshan and He County), Wuhu (except Wuwei County), Tongling, Xuancheng, Huangshan and Chizhou. The region corresponds to the part of Anhui south of the Yangtze. Wannan has a distinctive culture from the rest of Anhui, having its own dialect and cuisine, and is known for tea cultivation. Compared to the rest of Anhui, the region is much more mountainous.

== See also ==
- New Fourth Army incident
- Wannan Medical College
- Wanbei
