= Fujian Military District =

- 中国人民解放军福建省军区
- Founded: August 1949; 76 years ago
- Country: China
- Allegiance: Chinese Communist Party
- Type: Military district
- Role: Command and control
- Part of: People's Liberation Army
- Headquarters: Fuzhou, Fujian

Commanders
- Commander: Major general (shaojiang) Wang Hongyu
- Political Commisar: Major general (shaojiang) Song Hongxi

Chinese name
- Simplified Chinese: 中国人民解放军福建省军区
- Traditional Chinese: 中國人民解放軍福建省軍區
Transcriptions
Standard Mandarin
- Hanyu Pinyin: Zhōngguó Rénmín Jiěfàngjūn Fújiànshěng Jūnqū

The Fujian Military District (Chinese: 中国人民解放军福建省军区; full name People's Liberation Army Fujian Military District or PLA Fujian Military District) is a military district of the National Defense Mobilization Department of the Central Military Commission in China.

== History ==
The Fujian Military District was founded in August 1949.

== Leaders ==
=== Commanders ===
Name (English)	Name (Chinese)	Tenure begins	Tenure ends	Note
Ye Fei	叶飞	March 1949	January 1958	
Liu Yongsheng	刘永生	January 1958	February 1959	
Lei Zhen	雷震	June 1959	April 1964	
Zhu Yaohua	朱耀华	May 1964	July 1971	
Wang Zhiguo	汪治国	July 1971	November 1976	
Cong Dezi	丛德滋	November 1976	May 1983	
Lu Fuxiang	卢福祥	May 1983	August 1985	
Zhang Zongde	张宗德	November 1985	June 1990	
Chen Shuqing	陈树清	June 1990	November 1992	
Ren Yonggui	任永贵	November 1992	March 1996	
Chen Mingrui	陈明瑞	March 1996	March 2001	
Zhang Hetian	张鹤田	March 2001	August 2006	
Liu Shenyang	刘沈扬	December 2006	February 2009	
Wang Qingguang	汪庆广	February 2009	March 2014	
Xiong Andong	熊安东	March 2014	March 2017	
Yu Zhonghai	于中海	March 2017	August 2018	
Wang Bin	王滨	August 2018	January 2020	
Wu Xihua	吴喜铧	January 2020	26 December 2021	
Wang Hongyu	王宏宇	26 December 2021		

=== Political commissars ===
Name (English)	Name (Chinese)	Tenure begins	Tenure ends	Note
Ye Fei	叶飞	September 1953	May 1957	
Wu Hongxiang	伍洪祥	October 1957	May 1958	
Lu Sheng	卢胜	January 1958	January 1961	
Zhang Chuangchu	张闯初	January 1961	April 1964	
Liu Jianting	刘健挺	March 1964	May 1978	Second Political Commissar
Fan Shiren	范式人	January 1965	January 1975	
Luo Yinghuai	罗应怀	November 1969	May 1972	
Ni Nanshan	倪南山	December 1970	November 1976	
Gao Zhanjie	高占杰	July 1971	June 1975	Second Political Commissar
Jiang Runguan	蒋润观	July 1975	October 1979	
Zhang Zhiyong	张志勇	March 1979	July 1980	
Meng Letian	孟乐天	July 1980	May 1983	
Liu Tingzhu	刘挺柱	July 1980	May 1983	
Xiang Nan	项南	April 1982	March 1986	First Political Commissar
Lin Zhize	林治泽	May 1983	August 1985	
Zhang Zongde	张宗德	August 1985	November 1985	
Cong Lizhi	丛立志	November 1985	July 1988	
Chen Shuqing	陈树清	July 1988	June 1990	
Zheng Shichao	郑仕超	June 1990	May 1992	
Sui Shengwu	隋绳武	May 1992	February 1996	
Lu Fengdian	陆凤殿	February 1996	September 1999	
Wu Qingtian	吴青田	September 1999	August 2005	
Li Guangjin	李光金	August 2005	May 2009	
Zhu Shengling	朱生岭	May 2009	March 2013	
Cao Dexin	曹德信	March 2013	January 2015	
Su Baocheng	苏保成	January 2015	September 2020	
Song Hongxi	宋鸿喜	September 2020		
