= Zhu Liangcai =

Chinese general

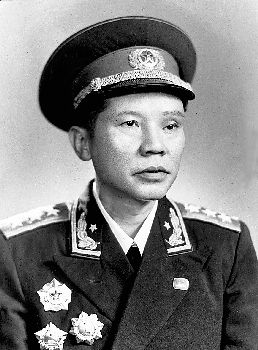
- Native name: 朱良才
- Born: September 27, 1900; Rucheng County, Hunan, Republic of China
- Died: 22 February 1989 (aged 88) Beijing, People’s Republic of China
- Allegiance: Communist China; Republic of China; China
- Rank: General
- Conflicts: Chinese Civil War; Second Sino-Japanese War

Zhu Liangcai (Chinese: 朱良才; pinyin: Zhū Liángcái; 27 September 1900 – 22 February 1989) was a general in the Chinese People's Liberation Army.

Zhu was in Waisha Village, Rucheng County, Hunan Province. He joined the Chinese Communist Party in October 1927.

From 1955–1958 he was the political commissar of Beijing Military Region.

He was made a general in 1955. He was awarded first-class Eight-One medal, first-class Independence Freedom medal and first-class Liberation medal. In July 1988, he was awarded first-class Red Star Honorary Medal.

He died on 22 February 1989 in Beijing, at the age of 88.

== See also ==
- List of officers of the People's Liberation Army
