= Lu Sheng =

Chinese military officer

- 卢胜
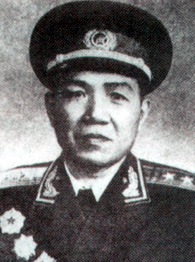

Political Commissar of the Fujian Military District
- In office January 1958 – January 1961
- Preceded by: Wu Hongxiang
- Succeeded by: Zhang Chuangchu

Personal details
- Born: Lu Jiayang; 6 November 1911 Fangling Village, Lehui County, Guangdong (Now Qionghai City, Hainan), Qing China
- Died: 23 September 1997 (aged 85) Fuzhou, Fujian, People's Republic of China

Military service
- Allegiance: Qiongya Soviet ^{zh}(1928); People's Republic of China
- Branch/service: Chinese Red Army; New Fourth Army; People's Liberation Army Ground Force
- Awards: August 1 Medal (2nd Class); Order of Independence and Freedom (2nd Class); Order of Liberation (1st Class); Order of Freedom and Independence (North Korea) (1st Class)

Lu Sheng (simplified Chinese: 卢胜; traditional Chinese: 盧勝; pinyin: Lú shèng; November 5, 1911 – September 23, 1997) was a People's Liberation Army lieutenant general. He was born in Qionghai, Hainan Province (then part of Guangdong Province).

== Biography ==
=== Early life ===
Lu Jiayang was born November 5, 1911, to a peasant family in Fangling Village, Lehui County (now Qionghai City). Lu's parents died in his youth, and he was raised by his grandmother until her death when he was 14 years old. Soon after, Lu would join the Peasant-Self Defense Army in 1927. Following defeats of the Qiongya Soviet^{zh} under the Kuomintang's encirclement and suppression campaigns, Lu would flee to Singapore, and work as a rubber worker and seaman. Lu would join the Communist Youth League of China in 1929, before returning to China in 1932 following his deportation from Singapore owed to his support for union activities.

=== Early Military Activities ===
In 1933, Lu would join the 3rd Regiment of the Southern Fujian Red Army, advancing to the rank of political commissar and platoon leader of the 4th Red Company. The 4th Red Company would remain in Southern Fujian following the main retreat of the Chinese Red Army from the Jiangxi Soviet in the Long March, attacking Yunxiao County. Lu would assist in guerilla efforts along the Fujian-Guangdong border region.

Following the outbreak of the Second Sino-Japanese War, Lu would serve in as the commander of the 4th Regiment under the 2nd Dettachment of the New Fourth Army, under Commander Zhang Dingcheng, stationed in Northern Jiangxi and Anhui. Lu would later take various administrative and political positions within the New Fourth Army, participating in various battles against the Japanese Army around Jiangsu province. Following the resumption of the Chinese Civil War, Lu would participate in the Huaihai, Yangtze River Crossing, and Shanghai campaigns.

=== Involvement in Korean War and Later Life ===
Lu would lead the 23rd Army of the 9th Corps of the People's Liberation Army as political commissar. For his efforts in the Korean War, Lu would be awarded the First-Class Medal of Freedom and Independence from the Democratic People's Republic of Korea. Following the end of the Korean War, Lu would return to study at a military academy, and later work as a military advisor in Fuzhou. In 1955, he would receive the August 1st Medal, Order of Independence and Freedom, and Order of Liberation for his military service. He would serve in the 4th and 6th National People's Congress, and serve on the 5th Standing Committee of the People's Political Consultative Conference. Lu Sheng would pass away in Fuzhou on September 23, 1997, at the age of 85.

Military offices
Preceded by Wu Hongxiang	Political Commissar of the Fujian Military District; 1958–1961	Succeeded by Zhang Chuangchu
