= Rao Shoukun =

- 饶守坤

Commander of Jinan Military Region
- In office January 1980 – June 1985
- Preceded by: Zeng Siyu
- Succeeded by: Li Jiulong

Commander of the North Sea Fleet
- In office August 1975 – January 1980
- Preceded by: Ma Zhongquan
- Succeeded by: Yang Li

Personal details
- Born: 30 September 1911 Dexing County, Jiangxi, China
- Died: 14 September 2006 (aged 90) Jinan, Shandong, China
- Party: Chinese Communist Party
- Education: Counter-Japanese Military and Political University; PLA Military Academy

Military service
- Allegiance: People's Republic of China
- Branch/service: People's Liberation Army Ground Force
- Years of service: 1932–1985
- Rank: Lieutenant general
- Battles/wars: Second Sino-Japanese War; Chinese Civil War
- Awards: August 1 Medal (1st Class); Order of Independence and Freedom (2nd Class); Order of Liberation (1st Class)

Chinese name
- Simplified Chinese: 饶守坤
- Traditional Chinese: 饒守坤
Transcriptions
Standard Mandarin
- Hanyu Pinyin: Ráo Shǒukūn

Rao Shoukun (Chinese: 饶守坤; 30 September 1915 – 14 September 2006) was a founding lieutenant general (zhongjiang) of the People's Liberation Army (PLA). He was a representative of the 11th and 12th National Congress of the Chinese Communist Party. He was a delegate to the 5th and 6th National People's Congress.

== Biography ==
Rao was born into a peasant family in Dexing County (now Dexing), Jiangxi, on 30 September 1915.

Under the influence of Fang Zhimin, he joined the Communist Youth League of China in June 1931. He enlisted in the Red Army in February 1932, and joined the Chinese Communist Party (CCP) in June 1933. During the Agrarian Revolutionary War, he fought guerrilla warfare with Kuomintang troops in both Jiangxi and Fujian provinces. During the Second Sino-Japanese War, he was given the position of a regimental commander, serving in the battlefields of Anhui. During the Chinese Civil War, he served in the war and engaged in the Battle of Leiwu, Menglianggu campaign, Yangtze River Crossing campaign, and Shanghai Campaign.

After the establishment of the Communist State in 1949, he successively served as commander of the 7th Fleet of the Navy of the East China Military Region, commander of the Wusong Fortress, and commander of the Songhu Base. He attained the rank of lieutenant general (zhongjiang) in 1955. In October 1958, he was made deputy commander of the East China Sea Fleet of the People's Liberation Army Navy. In 1966, the Cultural Revolution broke out, he was discharged and suffered political persecution, and forced to work in Luoyang Diesel Engine Factory and then a factory of the Harbin Navy. He was reinstated as president of the Seventh Research Institute of the Ministry of Defense. In 1975, he was named commander of the North Sea Fleet, succeeding Ma Zhongquan. In January 1980, he was promoted to become commander of Jinan Military Region, a position he held until June 1985. In 1985, he became a member of the Advisory Committee of the CPC Central Committee.

On 14 September 2006, he died in Jinan, Shandong, at the age of 90.

== Publication ==
- 饶守坤回忆文集 [Recollections of Rao Shoukun] (in Chinese). Beijing: CCP CPC History Press. 1994.

Military offices
| Preceded by Ma Zhongquan | Commander of the North Sea Fleet; 1975–1980 | Succeeded by Yang Li |
| Preceded by Zeng Siyu | Commander of Jinan Military Region; 1980–1985 | Succeeded by Li Jiulong |
