= Ye Ting =

Chinese military officer

- 叶挺
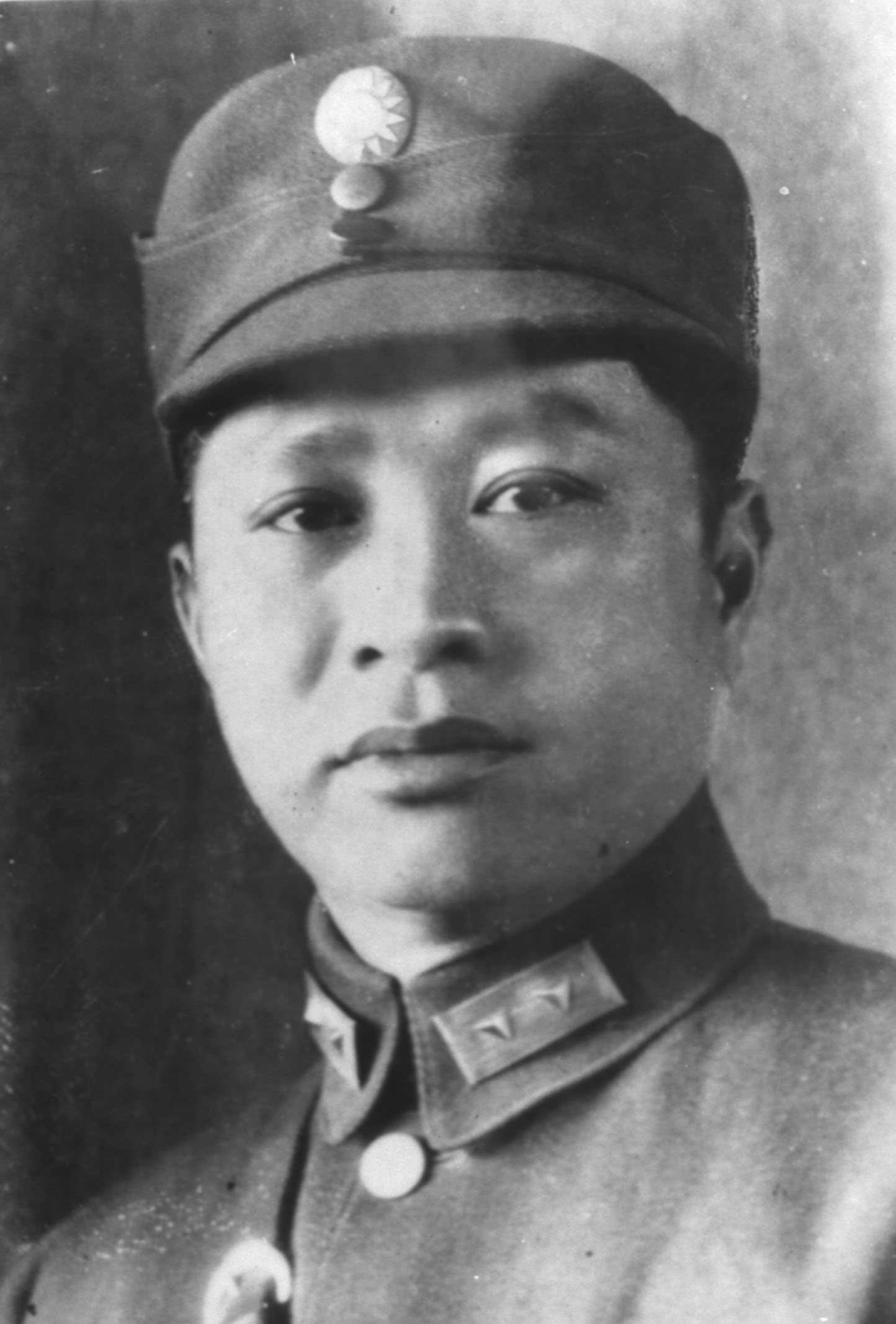
- Born: September 10, 1896; Zhoutian village, Huizhou Prefecture, Guangdong, China (present-day Huizhou, Guangdong, China)
- Died: April 8, 1946 (aged 49); Xing County, Shanxi, China
- Relatives: Ye Zhengda (son); Ye Huaming (son, Chairman of Shenzhen Xianke Group); Ye Daying (grandson, dirtector)
- Military career
- Allegiance: Kuomintang (1919-1924); Chinese Communist Party (1924-1928, 1946)
- Rank: Lieutenant General
- Commands: New Fourth Army
- Conflicts: Warlord Era; Guangdong–Guangxi War; Northern Expedition; Chinese Civil War; Nanchang Uprising; Guangzhou Uprising; Fujian Incident; New Fourth Army Incident; Second Sino-Japanese War

Chinese name
- Traditional Chinese: 葉挺
- Simplified Chinese: 叶挺
Transcriptions
Standard Mandarin
- Hanyu Pinyin: Yè Tǐng
- Wade–Giles: Yeh^{4} Ting^{3}
Hakka
- Pha̍k-fa-sṳ: Ya̍p Thén
Yue: Cantonese
- Jyutping: Jip^{6} Ting^{5}
Southern Min
- Hokkien POJ: Ia̍p Théng
- Teochew Peng'im: Iab^{8} Têng^{2}
Eastern Min
- Fuzhou BUC: Iĕk Tīng

Ye Ting (simplified Chinese: 叶挺; traditional Chinese: 葉挺; pinyin: Yè Tǐng) (April 10, 1896 – April 8, 1946) was a Chinese military officer and figure who played a key role in the Northern Expedition to reunify China after the 1911 Revolution. After serving with the Kuomintang, Ye later joined the Chinese Communist Party (CCP).

== Early life ==
Ye was born on April 10, 1896 at Zhoutian village, Danshui town, in Guishan county, located in Guangdong province. Ye's ancestors migrated from Ye county in Henan to the south, through Meizhou and Hingning, eventually settling in Guangdong. Ye's grandfather was Ye Hanchu, who had experience in medicine. Ye's father was Ye Xisan, who travelled to Malaysia in his early life to work on a plantation, learning how to plant tropical fruits. After returning to his hometown, Ye's father rented 11 mus' of farmland and planted fruit trees to make a living. Ye's mother's last name is Wu and he is the eighth child in the family.

Ye was energetic and helped his father with farming when he was young. He was sent to the nearby Tengyun school to study. Ye also studied at the Sericultural School of Huizhou in 1911. Before he left the school, his teacher Chen Jingru suggested that he change his name to Ye Ting. Under the influence of the Second Guangzhou Uprising, Ye led his schoolmates to cut their queue hairstyles and was expelled by his school. After this experience, Ye entered Huizhou middle school. After the 1911 Revolution, Ye's father made Ye marry Huang Chun, who was 2 years older, in an attempt to encourage his son to settle down.

Ye entered into Guangzhou Landforce Primary School in 1912. Ye graduated from the school in December 1914 and traveled north to Hubei, studying military knowledge in Hubei Army Second Preparatory School. At the end of 1916 after earning a place on the Dean's list, Ye was recommended for admission to Baoding Landforce Military Academy. During his studies at the military academy, Ye gained access to a number of new ideas through reading New Youth and other journals and books. Ye wrote to New Youth journal and raised the idea that "the root of morality" is at consciousness", and expressed his ideal of "reviving the dirty world and helped the weaks and the drowns". In 1918, he graduated from Baoding Landforce Military Academy. He planned to study abroad in Europe but failed due to lack of money. At this time, the old Guangxi clique leader Lu Rongting wanted Ye to be the county magistrate of Huiyang, but Ye refused. Ye followed Sun Yat-sen to participate in the revolution of 1919 introduced by He Ziyuan, the general headquarter senate of Sun's Guangdong Army and one of the founding members of the Xinhai revolution. Ye then joined the Guangdong Army in Zhangzhou, Fujian, eventually joining the Kuomintang.

== Military career ==
Ye joined the Kuomintang when Sun Yat-sen founded it in 1919, becoming a battalion commander in the National Revolutionary Army in 1921. In 1920, Sun had ordered the Guangdong Army to attack Mo Rongxin of the Old Guangxi clique. Ye's reputation had spread after the Huangpijing battle when his troops defeated an enemy who had four times as many troops as his own army. In October 1920, Ye took office as Deputy Battalion Commander of the Sapper Battalion. In 1921, he was transferred to the position of Battalion Commander of the guard regiment's second battalion of Sun's Marshall House of Land and Naval Forces. In June 1922, troops from the commander-in-chief of the Guangdong army bombarded the Marshall House. Ye was ordered to guard the forecourt of the Marshall House and helped Sun's wife, Soong Ching-ling, to escape danger. In 1924, Ye went to study at Communist University of the Toilers of the East in the Soviet Union. During this time, Ye joined the Communist Youth League of China and accepted Marxism. In December 1924, Lvmo branch of the CCP, who accepted Ye as a candidate Party member, having been introduced by Wang Ruofei and Wang Yifei. Ye transferred to the Institute of Red Professors February 1925 for training in military tactics and history.

In 1925, Ye returned to China to serve first as a staff officer, then as an independent regiment commander in the Fourth Army of the National Revolutionary Army. In January 1926, Ye joined the attack on Hainan Island. Due to Fourth Army commander Li Jishen's orders in May, the 12th Division joined the Northern Expedition and ordered Zhang Fakui to send Ye's 34th regiment ahead. In May 1926, he led an advance detachment in the Northern Expedition, with several victories in August. In September, Ye besieged Wuchang, breaking through the defenses on October 10. He had led the entire effort to blast through the city walls. In 1927, he served as Deputy Division Commander of the 15th Division, Division Commander of the 24th Division of the 11th Army, and Deputy Commander of the 11th Army.

Ye formulated an officer and recruit training plan, and strictly applied a "4 exercises" and "3 lessons" rules to the army. Ye paid a lot of attention towards political education and held several anti-violence and anti-corruption activities. In the middle of January 1926, Ye followed the National Revolutionary Army in an attack on Hainan Island. The Fourth army then reorganized the 34th regiment to be an independent regiment of the Fourth Army, ordering it to travel to Hunan.

In May 1926, Ye led his troops as an advanced force in the Northern Expedition. He left Zhaoqing and Xinhui, then proceeded to the frontline in Hunan to attack Wu Peifu. After a two-day battle started on June 5, the independent regiment attacked and occupied You County in Hunan. On July 3, the 12th division of the Fourth Army came back from Hainan, met with the 35th and 36th regiments, then reformed as the complete 12th division in You County; they later attacked and occupied Liuyang on July 20. In August, the 12th division attacked the Tingsi Bridge in Xianning, Hubei. During this battle, Ye's independent regiment was used as the reserve team of the division. When the direct attack on Tingsi Bridge was not successful, Ye investigated a small path towards the back of Tingsi Bridge. After the Deputy Commander of the Fourth Army, Chen Keyu, ordered Ye to take a surprising attack on the back of Wu's army, the army achieved a complete win. After this battle, the independent regiment attacked and occupied several territories, including Taolinpu and Yindoushan.

On August 30, the Fourth and Seventh Army of the National Revolutionary Army started to battle with Wu's Army. Ye was the first one to attack the position of Wu's army, with other troops following in an attempt to improve the outcome of the battle, eventually taking Hesheng Bridge. Ye led his troops to hemming in the opposing forces in Wuchang. During the battle in Wuchang, Ye attacked the city wall, blowing it up. On October 10, Ye led his troops to attack the city itself. Ye was known as one of the "famous generals" in the North Expedition. The Fourth Army itself was called the "Iron Army" under their commander, Zhang Fakui. During the attack in Wuchang, Ye's independent regiment lost dramatically: the battalion commander of the first battalion died, while the second division of the northern expedition army, led by Liu Chi, assist in the attack. After Wuchang was attacked and occupied, the second division entered the city faster than Ye's, and Liu Chi was then ordered to be the Wuhan garrison commander. Ye was angry about this order and left the army. He went back to Shanghai and saw his relatives, and was punished by being closely supervised by the Party for six months.

The Kuomintang government moved from Guangzhou to Wuhan in January 1927. The National Revolutionary Army was expanded and Ye was appointed as the Deputy Division Commander of the 25th Division, and Division Commander of the 24th Division of the 11th Army. In May 1927, the Nanjing-Wuhan Split occurred. On May 13, the commander of the Independent 14th Division, Xia Douyin, announced through a phone call a crusade in the communist party against the KMT and attacked Wuhan, which was controlled by the left-wing KMT. In the meantime, the Wuhan government was expanded north to attack Henan. Ye led to counter the attack and he soon defeated Xia. In June, Ye was appointed as Deputy Army Commander of the 11th Army.

On August 1, 1927, with Chen Yi, Zhou Enlai, He Long, Zhu De, Ye Jianying, Lin Biao, Liu Bocheng and Guo Moruo, he participated in the failed Nanchang Uprising, when the Chinese Red Army was founded. After Nanchang, he went to Hong Kong, and on December 11 of that year, he led the Canton Uprising. After this uprising failed, Ye was persecuted as a scapegoat and as a result, he was exiled to Europe. He first went to the Soviet Union, but cut ties with the communist party. He then spent time in Berlin and Vienna, and eventually retired in Hong Kong. When he returned to Asia, Ye went into hiding in Macau.

== New Fourth Army and death ==
In 1937, Ye served as commander of the New Fourth Army. During the New Fourth Army Incident, Ye, wanting to save his men, went to Shangguan Yunxiang's headquarters on January 13, 1941 to negotiate terms. Upon arrival, Ye was detained by the 52nd division of the 156th regiment. Chiang Kai-shek ordered the New Fourth Army disbanded on January 17 and sent Ye to a military tribunal. Ye was then jailed for five years, until 1946. On April 8, 1946, after he was released, Ye died in a plane crash en route from Chongqing to Yan'an. Among the victims were his wife Li Xiuwen, daughter Ye Yangmei, son, Ye Ajiu, and the nanny for his children, Gao Qiong, as well as several senior CCP leaders such as Bo Gu, Deng Fa, and Wang Ruofei. There are rumors that Chiang Kai-shek arranged the crash. On April 17, the Jin Sui branch of the Central Committee of the CCP (Chinese: 中共中央晋绥分局) held a public memorial at the Lan County airport.

Ye had a total of nine children including aircraft designer Lt. Gen. Ye Zhengda. One of his granddaughters, Ye Xiaoyan (叶小燕), through Ye's second son Ye Zhengming (叶正明), is married to Li Xiaoyong (李小勇), son of former Chinese premier Li Peng.
