= New Fourth Army Incident =

1941 conflict in the Chinese Civil War

- Part of the Second Sino-Japanese War and the Chinese Civil War
Date	January 7–13, 1941 (6 days)
Location	Maolin, Jing County, Anhui province, Republic of China
Result	Nationalist tactical victory

Belligerents
(Republic of China (1912–1949)) Republic of China: KMT	New Fourth Army: CCP

Commanders and leaders
Gu Zhutong; Shangguan Yunxiang; Huang Baitao	Ye Ting (POW); Xiang Ying †; Yuan Guoping †

Units involved
3rd Military Region: 32nd Army Group	New 4th Army

Strength
80,000	9,000

Casualties and losses
2,000+ casualties	7,000 dead, captured, or missing

The New Fourth Army Incident (Chinese: 新四軍事件), also known as the South Anhui Incident or Wannan Incident (Chinese: 皖南事變), occurred in China in January 1941 during the Second Sino-Japanese War, during which the Chinese Civil War was, in theory, suspended, uniting the Chinese Communist Party (CCP) and Nationalist Kuomintangs under a United Front against the Japanese invasion. It is significant as the end of substantive cooperation between the Nationalists and the CCP. Today, ROC and PRC historians view the New Fourth Army Incident differently. From the ROC point of view, the CCP attacked first and the incident was a punishment for its insubordination; from the PRC view, it was Nationalist treachery.

== Causes ==
=== ROC viewpoint ===
In the fall of 1940, the CCP's New Fourth Army (NFA) attacked Nationalist forces under Han Deqin for not moving their troops north of the Yellow River as ordered. In Gregor Benton's comprehensive history on the NFA, he discusses how the Kuomintang may have had ulterior motives for moving the Communist troops of the United Front north to put them more in harm's way and out of the Nationalist jurisdiction. The CCP's failure to move their troops as Chiang Kai-Shek ordered was used as justification for the incident. Benton also claims that the CCP first attacked the Nationalists and the Nationalists fought back.

=== PRC viewpoint ===
For PRC historians, the incident began in December 1940, when Chiang Kai-shek ordered Eighth Route Army and the New Fourth Army to withdraw from Anhui and Jiangsu to the north of the Yellow River in a month. In response, the CCP agreed to move the NFA troops in Southern Anhui (Wannan) to the northern shore of the Yangtze River due to the indecisiveness of commander Xiang Ying. On 4 January, the 9,000-strong force started to move from Yunling Township in Jing County towards Jiangsu, planning to cross the river along three routes.

== Ambush ==
On January 5, the CCP forces were surrounded in Maolin Township by a Nationalist force of 80,000 led by Shangguan Yunxiang and attacked days later. After days of fighting, heavy losses – including many civilian workers who staffed the army's political headquarters – were inflicted on the New Fourth Army due to the overwhelming numbers of Nationalist troops. On January 13, Ye Ting, wanting to save his men, went to Shangguan Yunxiang's headquarters to negotiate terms. Upon arrival, Ye was detained. The New Fourth Army's political commissar Xiang Ying was killed, and only 2,000 people, led by Huang Huoxing and Fu Qiutao, were able to break out.

== Aftermath ==
Chiang Kai-shek ordered the New Fourth Army disbanded on January 17, and sent Ye Ting to a military tribunal. However, on January 20, the Chinese Communist Party in Yan'an ordered the reorganization of the army with Chen Yi as the new army commander and Liu Shaoqi as political commissar. The new headquarters would be in Jiangsu, which was now the general headquarters for the New Fourth Army and the Eighth Route Army. Together, they comprised seven divisions and one independent brigade, totaling over 90,000 troops.

Because of this incident, the Nationalist Party of China was criticized for creating internal strife when the Chinese were supposed to be united against the Japanese; the CCP, on the other hand, was seen as heroes at the vanguard of the fight against the Japanese and Nationalist treachery. Although the CCP lost control of the lands south of the Yangtze River, it gained support from the population which strengthened their foundations north of the river.

According to the Nationalist Party, this incident was retribution to numerous occasions of treachery, harassment, and disobedience by the New Fourth Army.

The novelist Mao Dun's story Fushi is about this incident.

== See also ==
- Outline of the Chinese Civil War
