= Garan (name) =

Garan is both a given name and a surname. Notable people with the name include:

- Garan Croft (born 2001), Welsh boxer
- Garan Evans (born 1973), Welsh rugby union player
- Garan Fabou Kouyate (1925-2016), Malian civil and social figure
- Ronald J. Garan Jr. (born 1961), NASA astronaut
- Tiemoko Garan Kouyaté (1902-1942), Malian teacher

== See also ==
- Garan the Eternal, collection of science fiction
