= Anti-Imperialist League =

Anti-Imperialist League may refer to:

- All-America Anti-Imperialist League (1925–1933), mass organization of the Communist Party USA
- American Anti-Imperialist League (1898–1921), political organization established in response to the Spanish–American War
- Anti-Imperialist League, a name used by the Communist Party (India) in Punjab during the early 1930s; see Naujawan Bharat Sabha
- A misnomer for the League Against Imperialism
