= Zhou Wenyong =

Chinese communist revolutionary (1905–1928)

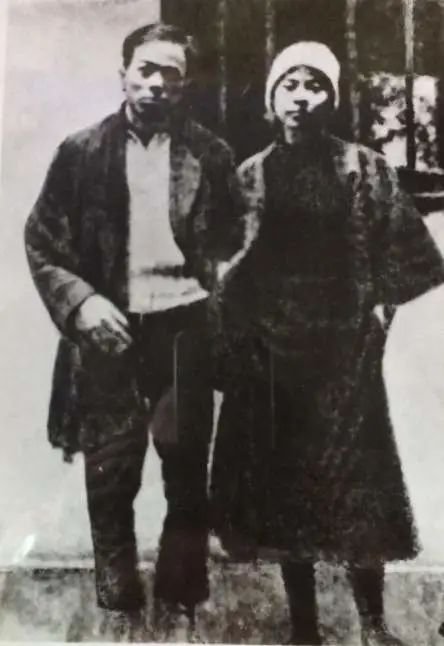
- Zhou Wenyong (left) and Chen Tiejun (right) shortly before their execution (1928)
- Born: August 1905; Kaiping, Qing Dynasty
- Died: 6 February 1928 (aged 22); Guangzhou, Republic of China
- Cause of death: Execution by firing squad
- Political party: Chinese Communist Party
- Partner: Chen Tiejun

Zhou Wenyong (August 1905 – 6 February 1928) was a Chinese Communist Party revolutionary who took part in the failed Guangzhou Uprising, for which he was executed by the Kuomintang alongside his partner Chen Tiejun.

== Biography ==
Zhou Wenyong was born in Kaiping in August 1905. He joined the Chinese Communist Party (CCP) in 1925, and became a member of the Standing Committee of the Guangdong Provincial Committee of the Chinese Communist Party.

In October 1927, Zhou Wenyong and Chen Tiejun were sent to Guangzhou where they posed as a married couple while helping the CCP to prepare for the upcoming Guangzhou Uprising. As an experienced labor organizer, Zhou was tasked with organizing a force of 2,000 CCP cadres to prepare for an uprising in Guangzhou. After the failure of the uprising, they returned to Guangzhou to try and rebuild the party's underground organs, but were arrested by the Kuomintang due to the betrayal of an informant.

Zhou Wenyong was executed alongside Chen Tiejun at Honghuagang execution ground in Guangzhou on 6 February 1928. At Zhou's request, they were photographed together in prison shortly before their execution, and they announced their intention to marry before they were executed. In 1957 a memorial was built at the site of their execution within the Guangzhou Martyrs' Memorial Garden.
