= Ligue de défense de la race nègre =

Black civil rights organization in France and Germany

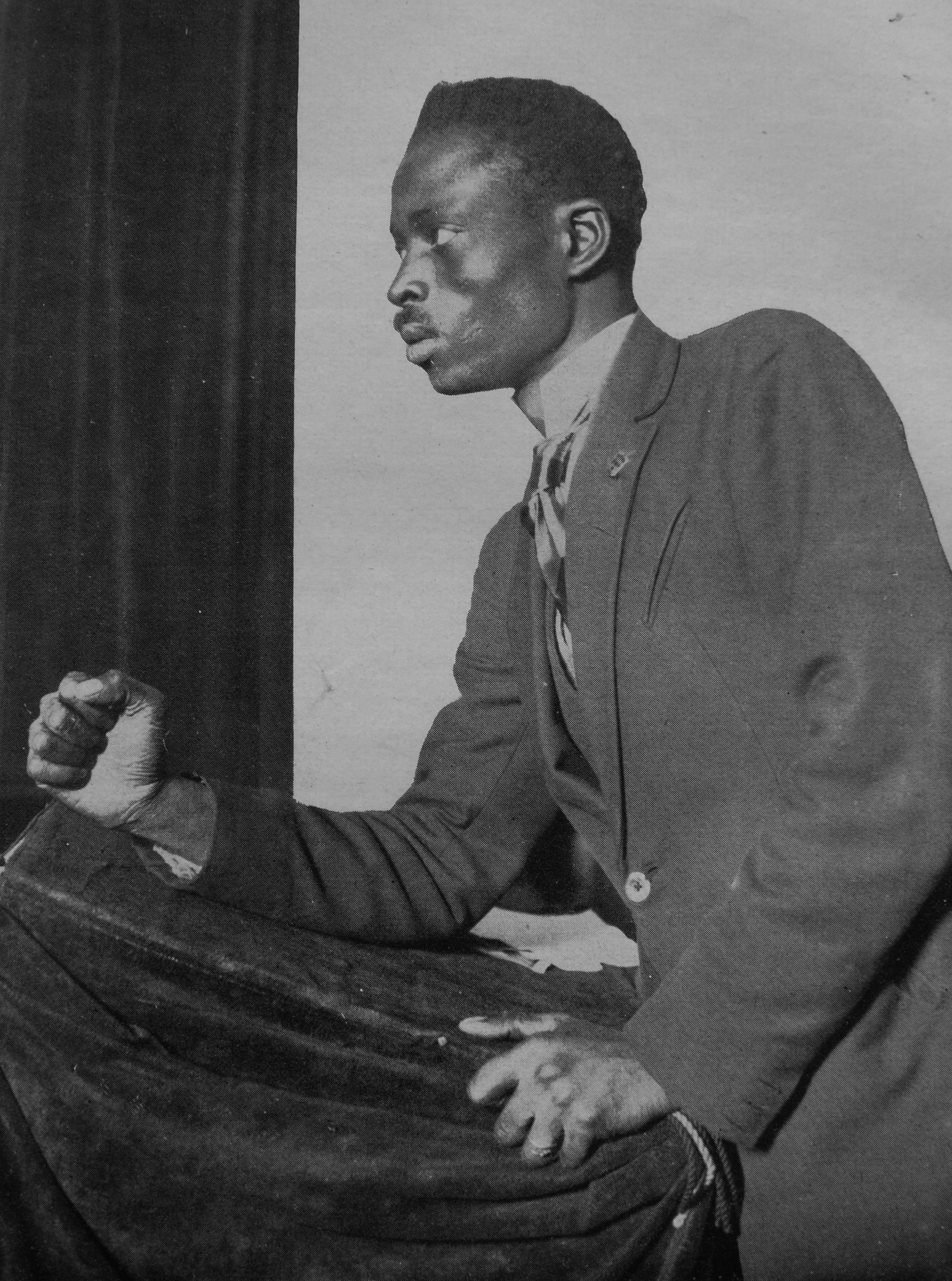
Lamine Senghor, founder and first Secretary General of the LDRN, 1927

The Ligue de défense de la race nègre (English: League for the Defense of the Negro Race) was an originally French civil rights organization of Black persons. It was founded in 1927 out of a predecessor organization whose roots went back to 1924. Its headquarters were in Paris, but in 1937 the French organization was disbanded. Under the name Liga zur Verteidigung der Negerrasse, there was a German section in Berlin from 1929 to 1935.

== History of origins ==
=== Ligue universelle de défense de la race noire ===
The Ligue universelle de défense de la race noire was founded on April 30, 1924, by Beninese Pan-Africanist Kojo Tovalou Houénou who also acted as chairman. It was the first major rallying organization of specifically Caribbean- as well as African-descended black people in France. It published the bimonthly journal Les Continents from May 1924, headed by Martinican writer René Maran. That same year, Tovalou traveled to the United States and attended a convention of Marcus Garvey's Universal Negro Improvement Association (UNIA), where he went on to speak at Carnegie Hall. Upon his return to Paris, these contacts were deemed dangerous by French authorities and Tovalou was forced to leave the country. The simultaneous publication in Les Continents of a sharp text by Maran against the first African member of the French parliament, Blaise Diagne, led to a libel suit. Weakened by the absence of its chairman, the Ligue disbanded.

=== Comité de défense de la race nègre ===
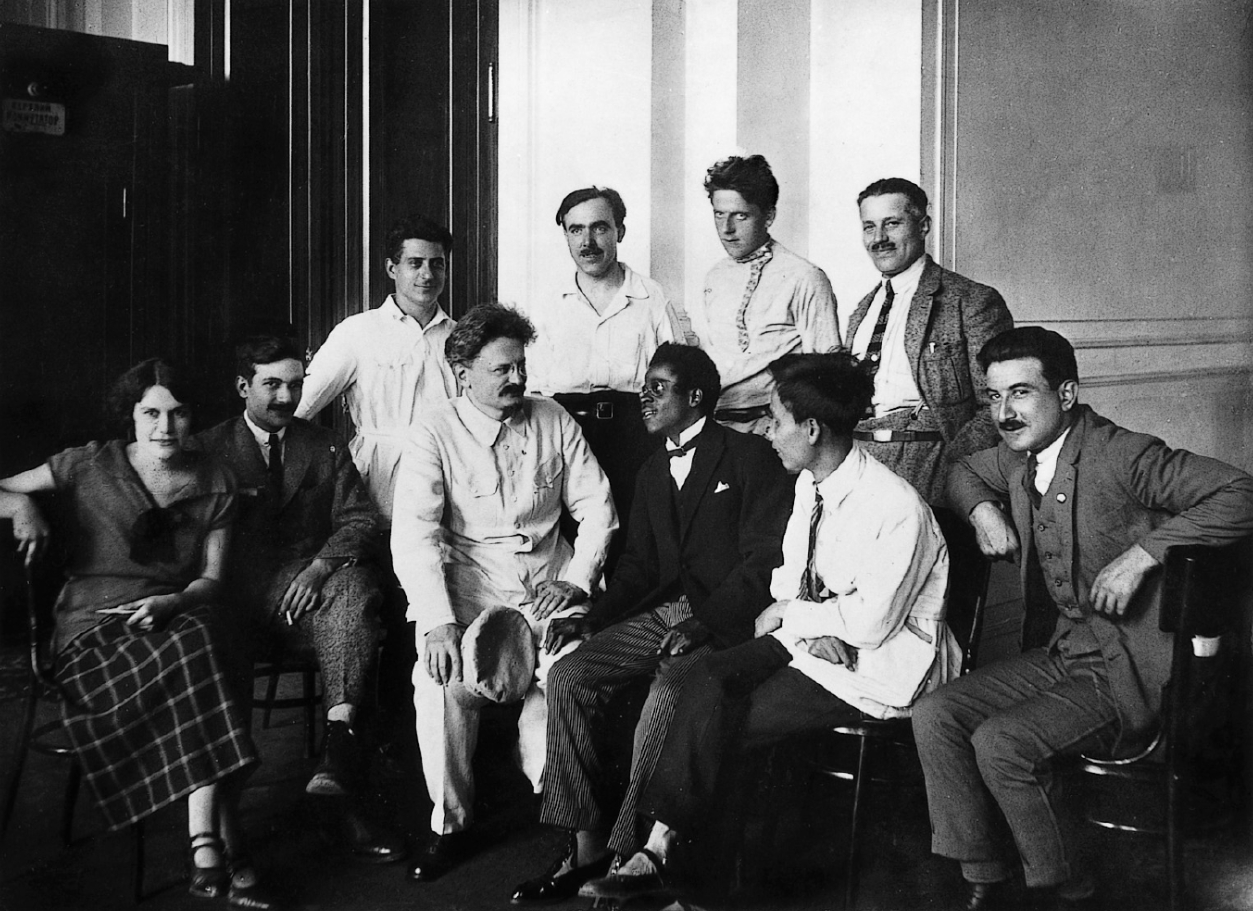
Joseph Gothon-Lunion (seated, third from right) alongside Leon Trotsky and Nguyen Ai Quoc at the 5th World Congress of the Communist International, 1924

From the ranks of the dissolved Ligue, former French soldier Lamine Senghor from Senegal and young lawyer Joseph Gothon-Lunion from Guadeloupe founded a new organization, the Comité de défense de la race nègre (CDRN), in March 1926. It edited the magazine La Voix des Nègres. Particularly through the efforts of Senghor, who traveled through French port cities and gave speeches to workers, offshoots of the CDRN were founded there as in West Africa. In 1926, the CDRN had about 1000 members, 250 in Marseille, 150 in Bordeaux, 300 in Le Havre and 200 in Paris.

However, content-related disputes quickly developed in the CDRN. On the one hand, there was the question of whether the term nègre or noir should serve as a self-designator - the retention of the term nègre was important to Senghor; he wanted to reappropriate the term and "pull this word out of the mud through which they drag it to make it a symbol." According to him, nègre symbolized African origins and political radicalism, whereas noir was associated with colonialist political ideas.

At the center, however, was the question of the group's political radicalism. The assimilationist part of the committee was concerned with the decidedly anti-colonial as well as more working-class and consequently communist orientation of the faction around Senghor and its willingness to openly criticize the French government, which could be interpreted as anti-French. These disputes led to a split in the CDRN at a general meeting on February 27, 1927. The moderate faction under Afro-Caribbean leadership took over the CDRN and renamed it Comité de défense de la race noire.

== Ligue de Défense de la Race Nègre ==
As a result of the split, Senghor, Tiemoko Garan Kouyaté from French Sudan, and postal employee Camille Sainte-Rose from Martinique founded the Ligue de Défense de la Race Nègre (LDRN) in May 1927, initially led by Senghor. From June, the monthly magazine La Race Nègre appeared as the publication of the group.

Now without restrictions from the moderate and assimilationist members, the League formulated anti-colonialist positions such as the demand for independence of the colonies and linked them with communist ideas. It had active groups in all major port cities, with a total of about 1,000 members. Like its predecessor and successor organizations, the LDRN was monitored by the authorities. Of the 50 or so members spied on in Paris, about half worked as service providers or laborers, 7 were students and 5 were lawyers, and the rest were mostly small employees.

While there was agreement on the basic anti-colonial principle, the exact demands within the group were quite variable. While some members articulated nationalist positions, others espoused pan-Africanist ideas. Although independence of any kind for the colonies was an undisputed common goal, the group also fought for improvements in the everyday status quo of French Africans. The communist ideas cultivated by the leadership repeatedly met with misgivings in parts of the group because this would keep out anti-imperialist-minded but noncommunist possible members of the group. Ludovic Lacombe, a Haitian member of the group, put it this way, saying that he was a "nationalist but anti-Communist Negro who did not want a master, white or red."

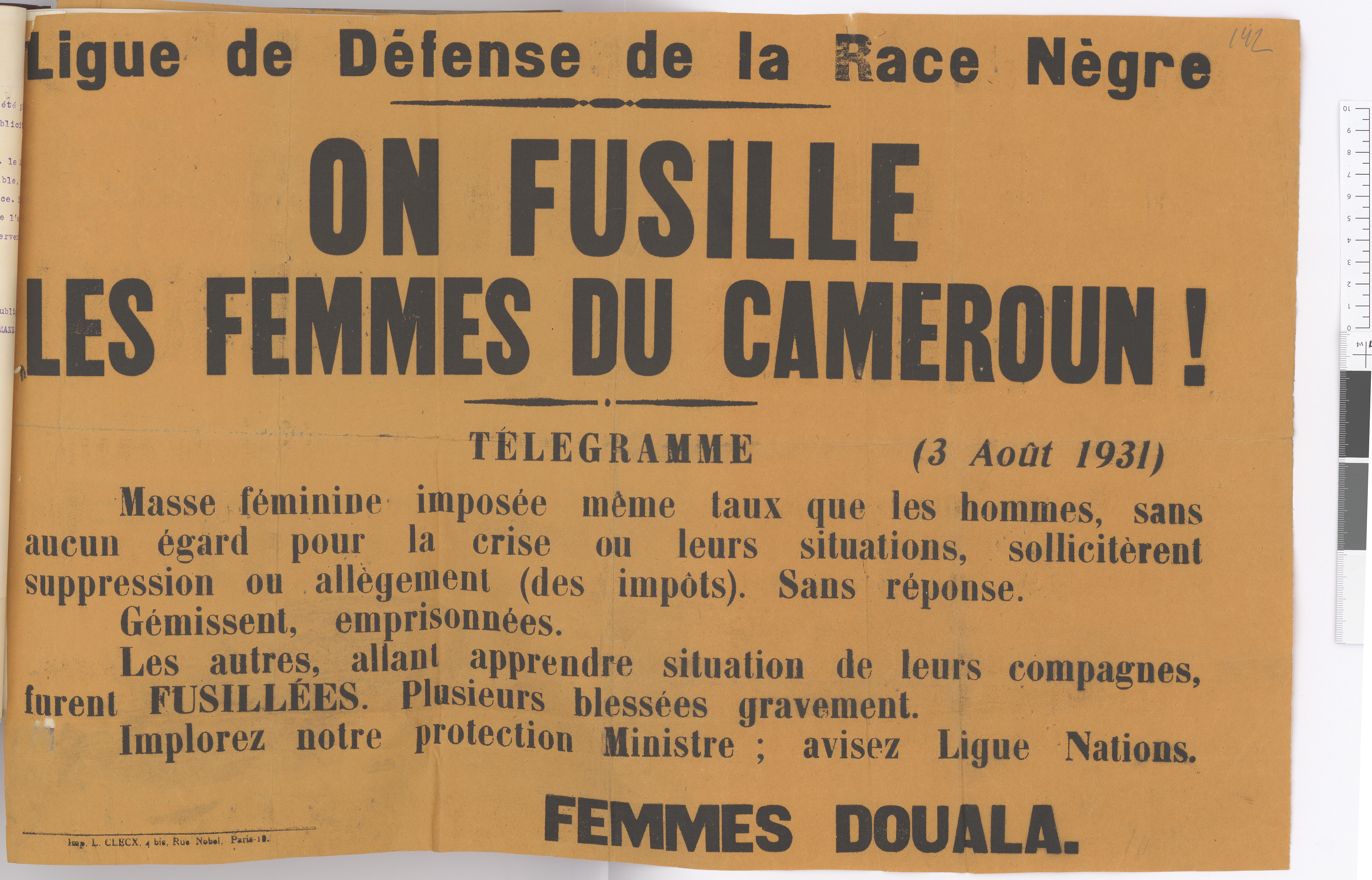
Poster of the LDRN, reporting a shooting on female protesters in Douala, Cameroon in August 1931

Senghor died in late 1927. He was succeeded by Kouyaté, who in the following years built up an international network, including with a Congolese group in Brussels, a short-lived group around later Kenyan president Jomo Kenyatta in London, with American activists such as W. E. B. Du Bois, and in French colonies such as Senegal and Cameroon. Kouyaté also smuggled propaganda material to Cameroon; for a short time, there was also a direct offshoot of the league in Kribi. These activities in France and the French colonies in West Africa greatly alarmed French authorities, who already surveilled the LDRN and viewed it as an anti-French communist front organisation.

In early 1931, a dispute over the leadership of the group began between the communist wing around Kouyaté and a "merely" anti-imperialist wing around Émile Faure, an engineer from Senegal, resulting in two separate groups claiming to be the LDRN. After Faure filed an official complaint against Kouyaté with the police, many searches, arrests and harassment by the police forces followed. In April 1931, two different issues of La Race Nègre appeared, one by Kouyaté, the other by Émile Faure, the lawyer André Béton of Guadeloupe, and Ludovic Lacombe.

The issue of ownership of the names Ligue de Défense de la Race Nègre and the magazine La Race Nègre was litigated in court between Faure and Kouyaté and in 1932 the court decided, that it was Faure's. In August 1931, Kouyaté had already changed the title of his journal though to Le Cri des Nègres. Either in 1931 or 1932 the Union des travailleurs nègres (UTN) was founded then as an undogmatic communist successor to the Ligue, but it was soon taken over by dogmatic communists and expelled Kouyaté. In 1939, the UTN dissolved itself.

After the split, the now weakened LDRN remained inactive until 1934, when it re-emerged to celebrate the death of Blaise Diagne. Led by Émile Faure as president, it took a resolutely pan-African and anti-colonialist position, attacking assimilationists as well as communist anti-colonialists and the Négritude movement. La Race Nègre was published sporadically until it ceased in 1936, representing "the core of a full-blown doctrine of nationalism, cultural and political, the first breakthrough of this kind among French Negroes". The LDRN was finally suppressed in 1937 by French authorities, and Faure was arrested and banished to the Sahara until the end of World War II.

== The German chapter: Liga zur Verteidigung der Negerrasse ==
In Berlin on September 17, 1929, seven men from Douala, Cameroon founded the Liga zur Verteidigung der Negerrasse (LzVN). With this step, they opposed worsening economic difficulties and racial prejudice in Germany and wanted to establish an organisation for political work and some mutual moral and financial support. Over the course of the year, about 30 black men and women came together, some of whom had already met in the Afrikanischer Hilfsverein, the first organisation of Black Germans, centered on mutual support, which had disbanded in the mid-1920s. The founding of the German section of the LDRN was supported by Willi Münzenberg, founder of the League Against Imperialism (LgI), who had already been bringing together important people from the African community in Berlin for anti-colonialist motives since 1926. He also established contact with Kouyaté, who was present at the founding meeting. A few months earlier, Kouyaté had already had copies of La Race Nègre distributed in Berlin via Münzenberg.

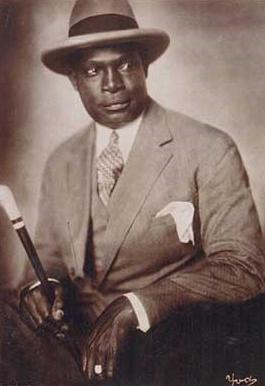
Louis Brody, founder and board member of the LzVN

Most members came from the former German colony of Cameroon, some from West Africa, such as Togo. All black Germans and their spouses could become members of the association. The president was Victor Bell, other board members were actor Louis Brody, Thomasul Kuo Ngambi, Richard Ekamby Menzel and, as secretary general and central figure, the pan-Africanist and communist Joseph Bilé, who was increasingly active in international politics with the help of his mentors Kouyaté and the influential and renowned panafrican activist George Padmore. Because of its communist relations, the group was at times surveilled by authorities.

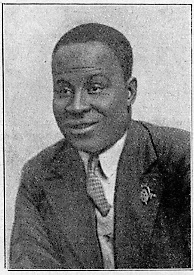
Joseph Bilé, founder and board member of the LzVN, 1932

In its statutes, the LzVN declared as its purpose to achieve the "liberation of the Negroes" internationally and to fight nationally for a large, independent African state. It advocated the independence of African states, especially the defense of the independence of Liberia and Ethiopia, encouraged black Germans to join German unions, and urged its members to provide mutual moral and material support, a legacy from the Afrikanischer Hilfsverein.

The LzVN was organizationally part of the LgI, was financed by it and also had its headquarters in its rooms at Friedrichstraße 24. It cooperated with the Comintern and a larger network of black internationalist organizations and activists in Europe and Africa, in addition to its French sister organization. The group smuggled political writings such as the statutes of the LzVN, among others, to Cameroon and maintained contact with activists there; most likely, they were also involved in anti-colonial protests in Douala. In 1930, the group performed Brody's play Sunrise in the Orient in Neukölln, the first half in Duala, the second in French, English and German. The play presented African history and culture of Africans probably for the first time in Germany without resorting to contemporary stereotypes. However, plans to establish its own "race theater" were not realized because the financial resources expected by the French Ligue were not available. Also in 1930, Bilé attended the First International Conference of Negro Workers in Hamburg as a delegate of the LzVN, which enhanced his status within the anti-colonial movement, as did subsequent discussions about him in the LgI and the Comintern, which earmarked him for training in Moscow and deployment as an agitator in Africa.

As the debate over Bilé continued, there were also accusations by the LzVN against the LgI that it was not providing the group with sufficient financial support. According to Bilé, the responsible supervisors, Virendranath Chattopadhyaya and Bohumír Šmeral, had failed to honor several funding pledges; according to Kouyaté, Chattopadhyaya had even opposed any further funding for the group, seeing it as no loss if it disbanded. As a result, the LzVN refused to continue working with the LgI and instead turned to the Communist Party of Germany (KPD) for support. Although this pacified the conflict, the personal hardship of the members led to internal squabbles and intrigue. With the Nazi seizure of power in 1933 the group became defenseless. In 1933, the KPD and the German section of the LgI struggled under the new rule, Padmore and Münzenberg had left the country, and Kouyaté was on his own after being expelled by the Ligue, its successor and the French Communist Party alike. As a result, the LzVN ceased its work completely. Many members of the LzVN left Germany; by August 1934, according to Bell, the group had only two members left. In 1935 the group was officially disbanded.
