= Tiejun =

Tiejun is a Chinese given name. People with this name include:

- Chen Tiejun (1904–1928), Chinese Communist revolutionary
- Li Tiejun (1904–2002), Chinese Nationalist general
- Wen Tiejun (born 1951), Chinese agricultural economist
- Cui Tiejun (born 1965), Chinese electrical engineer
