= Roberta Dodd Crawford =

Lyric soprano

- Born: 5 August 1897; Bonham, Texas, U.S.
- Died: 14 June 1954 (aged 56); Dallas, Texas, U.S.
- Occupation: Singer
- Spouse(s): William B. Crawford; Kojo Tovalou Houénou
- Parent(s): Joe Dodd; Emma Dunlap Dodd

Roberta Dodd Crawford (5 August 1897 – 14 June 1954) was an African-American lyric soprano and voice instructor who performed throughout the United States and Paris in the 1920s and 1930s. Roberta was born in Bonham, Texas before studying singing in Nashville, Chicago, and Paris. While in Paris, she married Prince Kojo Tovalou Houénou of Dahomey. When Houénou died in a French prison, Roberta was left without access to their marriage funds and returned to Paris where she lived through the Nazi occupation from 1940 until 1944. After the war, she returned to Texas where she died in 1954 in Dallas.

== Early life ==
Roberta Dodd Crawford was born on 5 August 1897 in the Tank Town section of Bonham, Texas. She was one of eight children of Joe and Emma Dodd (née Dunlap). She was active in the church choir and any other musical opportunities in Bonham while growing up. She worked at the Curtis Boarding House in town in 1914 and would often perform regular songs for customers. Because of her singing talents, five white women in the community paid for her to attend Wiley College until she transferred to Fisk University in Nashville, Tennessee and then in 1920 to the Chicago College of Performing Arts. She studied with many prominent singers and vocal coaches at these institutions including Roland Hayes and vocal coach Hattie Van Buren. While studying in Chicago, she married William B. Crawford, a captain in the U.S. Army.

== Musical career and marriages ==
Her first major performance was on 15 April 1926 at Kimball Hall in Chicago where she sang pieces in five different languages and included songs by African American composers, like N. Clark Smith. She was one of the few opera singers who would sing in Spanish at the time. She followed this performance with a number of shows throughout Missouri, Illinois, Minnesota, and Texas (including a concert in Bonham). At some point in the late-1920s, her relationship with William B Crawford ended; sources disagree, with some claiming that Roberta was widowed and others that she divorced.

After a number of concerts, she moved to Paris in 1928 to study with mezzo-soprano Blanche Marchesi. While in Paris in 1931, she met and began a relationship with Kojo Tovalou Houénou, a prominent African lawyer and writer who was related to the royal family of the kingdom of Dahomey (in present-day Benin). Crawford and Houénou married on 6 March 1932 in Paris and lived in the city for the early years of the marriage. The couple were very connected to the African and African-American communities in Paris during the 1930s and were active in the arts and cultural scenes. During this period, she went by the name Princess Tovalou Houénou and continued to perform in Paris. (Note: Although Kojo Tovalou Houénou's claims to the lineage of the royal family of Dahomey are very questionable and although the royal family and titles had been disrupted by the French conquest, he often went by the title "Prince" in his later life. In addition, when Kojo and Roberta first visited Dahomey in 1933, they were given a royal escort and referred to as "Prince" and "Princess" respectively. Roberta used the title "Princess" during her marriage, but with Kojo's death and the troubles which followed, she stopped using the title.) However, much of the later years were spent outside of Paris, in Dahomey, Senegal and other parts of West Africa as Houénou was continually harassed and arrested by French authorities for his political involvement. He died on 13 July 1936 while in a French prison.

== World War II and death ==
After Houénou's death, Crawford was unable to gain access to their shared property, which included her concert earnings, because they were all impounded by the French colonial authorities. She returned to Paris, lived with friends, and worked for the National library of Paris in the late 1930s. However, having little money, meant that she was unable to escape Paris when Nazi Germany took over the city at the beginning of World War II. As an African-American, her work and freedom were severely constrained, including periods under house arrest, in internment camps, and the inability to get work permits. Although she was a prisoner for a period during this time, there are conflicting reports regarding whether she was ever held in a concentration camp. When Allied troops entered Paris, she resumed singing and worked for the Red Cross entertaining troops. However, anemia and malnutrition prevented her from regular work and she returned to Texas sometime around 1950.

She died on 14 June 1954 of a heart attack in Dallas and is buried, in an unmarked grave, in Gates Hill Cemetery in Bonham.
