= Kojo Tovalou Houénou =

Beninese Pan-Africanist intellectual and doctor (1887–1936)

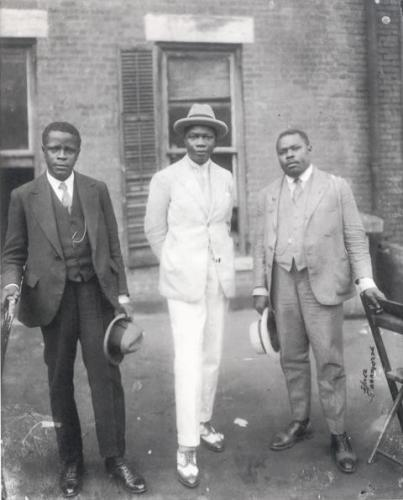
- George O. Marke (left), Kojo Tovalou Houénou, Marcus Garvey (right), 1924
- Born: Marc Tovalou Quénum; 25 April 1887; Porto-Novo, Dahomey
- Died: 13 July 1936 (aged 49); Dakar, Senegal, French West Africa
- Citizenship: French (from 1915)
- Occupation: Lawyer
- Known for: Critic of French African empire, writer, Prince of Dahomey
- Title: Prince of Dahomey
- Spouse: Roberta Dodd Crawford (m. 1931)
- Parent: Joseph Tovalou Quénum

Kojo Tovalou Houénou (born Marc Tovalou Quénum; 25 April 1887 – 13 July 1936) was a prominent African critic of the French colonial empire in Africa. Born in Porto-Novo (a French protectorate in present-day Benin) to a wealthy father and a mother who belonged to the royal family of the Kingdom of Dahomey, he was sent to France for education at the age of 13. There he received a law degree, medical training, and served in the French armed forces as an army doctor during World War I. Following the war, Houénou became a minor celebrity in Paris; dating actresses, writing books as a public intellectual, and making connections with many of the elite of French society.

In 1921, he visited Dahomey for the first time since 1900 and upon returning to France became active in trying to build better relations between France and the colony. In 1923, he was assaulted in a French nightclub by Americans who objected to an African being served in the club; the attack changed his outlook on issues and he became more active in working against racism. He founded an organization and a newspaper with the help of other African and African Caribbean intellectuals living in Paris like René Maran, who was a Martinican (from a Guianese family), and traveled to New York City to attend Marcus Garvey's Universal Negro Improvement Association (UNIA) conference. Upon returning to France, Houénou was considered a subversive by the French government, his newspaper went bankrupt, the organization he founded folded, and he was forced to leave France and move back to Dahomey. Following unrest attributed to him in there, he eventually relocated to Dakar, Senegal, where he continued to be harassed by the French authorities. He died from typhoid fever in 1936 while imprisoned in Dakar on contempt of court charges.

== Early life ==
Marc Tovalou Quénum (name later changed to Kojo Tovalou Houénou) was born 25 April 1887 in the city of Porto-Novo. Porto-Novo had become a French protectorate earlier in the decade and would become a key site of warfare between the French colonial empire and the Kingdom of Dahomey from 1890 until 1894. His father, Joseph Tovalou Quénum (d. 1925), was a successful businessman along the coast and his mother was a sister of the last independent king of Dahomey, Béhanzin. Joseph was an active supporter of the French empire and believed it would greatly assist the economy of the region. He provided key support for the French empire during the Franco-Dahomean wars, was awarded the French medal of honor for his service, and became one of three African advisers to the French colonial administration. In 1900, Joseph took two of his sons to Paris for the Exposition Universelle or World's Fair and while there decided to enroll Houénou and his half brother at a boarding school in Bordeaux.

Houénou finished boarding school and then earned a law degree with some medical training from the University of Bordeaux in 1911. He volunteered in August 1914 to serve as an army doctor in the French forces during World War I. Houénou was injured in 1915 and honorably discharged from the military, relocating to Paris with a military pension.

== Paris and Dahomey ==
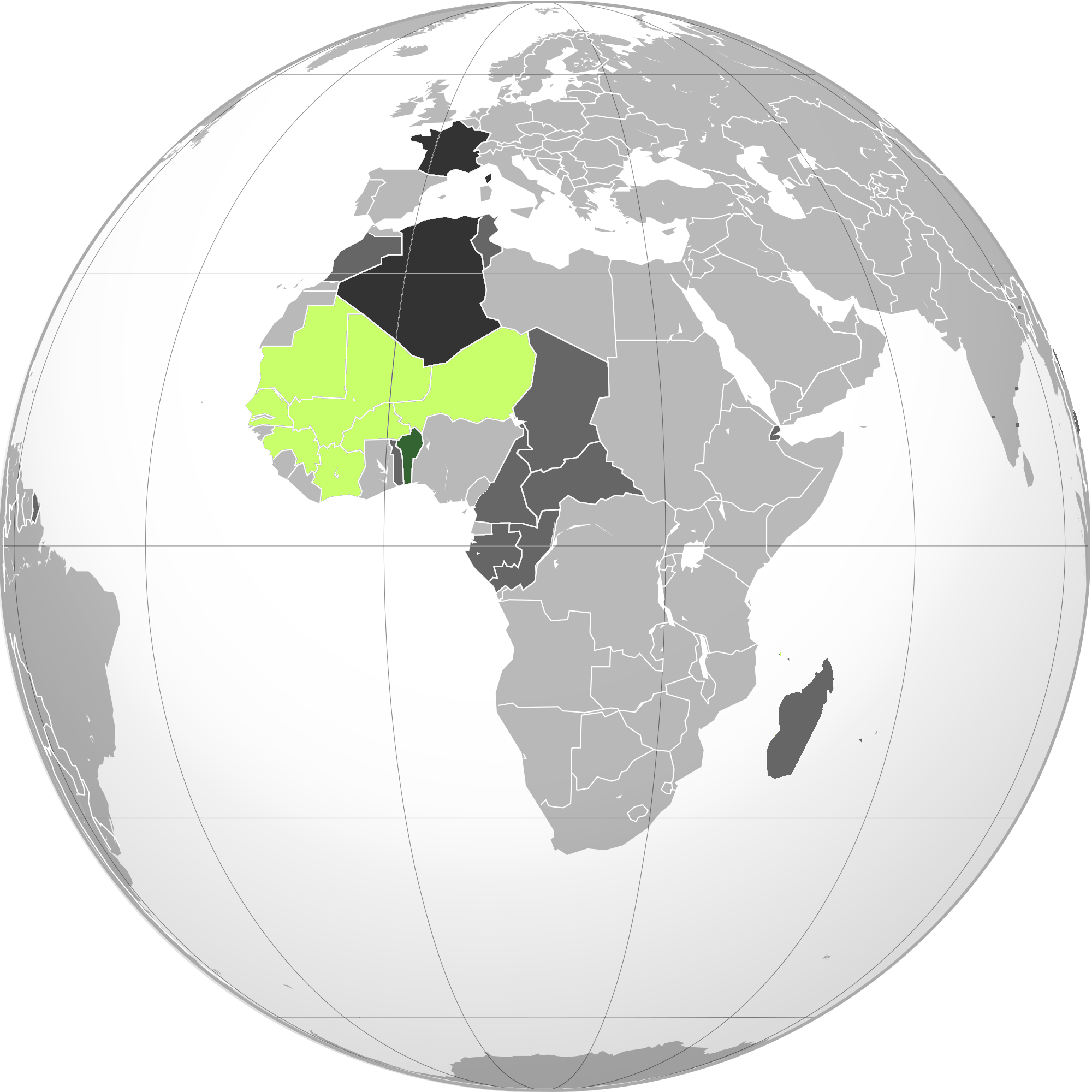
Green: French Dahomey Lime: Rest of French West Africa Dark gray: Other French possessions Darkest gray: French Republic

In 1915, Houénou was given French citizenship, an extremely rare status in colonial Africa for people of African descent at that point, with fewer than 100 being citizens of France by 1920. By 1918, he was admitted into the bar association and became a minor celebrity in Paris, with rumors of relationships (most notably with French actress Cécile Sorel) published in the French papers. Houénou became involved with the French intellectual scene and tried to be active as a public intellectual, including the 1921 publication of a scientific study of phonetics and linguistics titled L’involution des métamorphoses et des métempsychoses de l’Univers – L’involution phonétique ou méditations sur les métamorphoses et les métempsychoses du langage.

In late 1921, Houénou returned to Dahomey for the first time since he started his education in France in 1900. His father had been stripped of his position as advisor to the colonial government in 1903 and the French authorities had a standing policy since about 1908 to limit his influence in the colony. Seeing the poverty that existed in the colony and particularly following the 1923 riots in Porto-Novo, Houénou gradually grew increasingly critical of the French administration. At this point he limited his efforts to change French administration of colonies and not to end the French colonial structure. His interest in Dahomey led him to form the organization Amitié franco-dahoméenne in 1923 in order to promote gradual reform of the French colonial administration.

With this new focus, he changed the spelling of his last name from Quénum to Houénou, went by his traditional name Kojo rather than Marc, and claimed the royal title of Prince. Although he was the nephew of Béhanzin, the last independent king of Dahomey, his claims to be a Prince were dubious. Indeed, those claims were directly challenged in the later Knowlton divorce case in the United States.

After returning to France in 1923, Houénou became the center of a large controversy regarding race in Paris. While having a drink at the El Garòn nightclub in Montmartre, Houénou was attacked by Americans who were angered by the presence of an African in the club. The club owner responded to the struggle by forcibly removing Houénou and another person of African descent from the club. The situation became a scandal with the French press and the French government denouncing what they considered attempts by Americans to impose racial segregation in France. While denouncing the Americans, the French press elevated the status of Kojo significantly, referring to him in one incident as "a kind of colored Pascal." Although prior to this point Houénou had taken a limited role in promoting reform of the French colonial administration, the incident appeared to change his approach and he began to promote self-rule of African colonies on equal terms with France.

== Activism and repression ==
"Why do we not enjoy the rights of citizenship? We demand to be citizens, whatever the country, and that is why, if France rejects us, we call for autonomy; or, if she welcomes us, then for a total assimilation and integration. Enough of lies and hypocrisy! 'Association' under present terms is but thinly disguised slavery"

— Kojo Tovalou Houénou, in Les Continents 1 July 1924

After the El Garòn incident, Houénou became, in the words of historian Patrick Manning, the "most devastating African critic of the French colonial order." Houénou continued to support assimilation of Africans with French society, but now increasingly believed that assimilation could only happen if Africans had equal status. He began to argue that if Africans in the French colonies were not given equal citizenship and rights in the French empire that they should end the association and began self-rule.

To further this cause, in 1924 he founded an organization called the Ligue Universelle pour la Défense de la Race Noire and using his connections with intellectuals of Paris founded the newspaper Les Continents with René Maran, with whom he had studied at Bordeaux. He visited the United States the same year to attend a meeting of Marcus Garvey's Universal Negro Improvement Association (UNIA) in New York City and to tour a number of other cities, including Chicago and Pittsburgh.

Although he shared many of the aims of UNIA, Houénou believed that France was largely an unprejudiced society that needed reform of colonial administration, but not the type of societal reform that UNIA sought in the United States. Houénou said at the UNIA in 1924 that France "will never tolerate the prejudices of color. She considers her black and yellow children the equal of her white children." Upon returning to France though, his involvement at the UNIA meeting was a cause for suspicion by the French administration which began considering him a radical (and also accused him of being a communist). The French colonial administration began surveillance of Houénou's activities and treated Les Continents as a subversive publication. The Ligue Universelle pour la Défense de la Race Noire was so harassed by the surveillance of the French government that the organization folded in late 1924. A libel verdict in favor of Blaise Diagne against charges written by René Maran in Les Continents effectively bankrupted the newspaper and publication ceased in December 1924.

After returning from the UNIA meeting in 1924, Houénou was forced to leave France by the authorities and only allowed to reenter Dahomey in 1925 if he renounced the philosophies of Marcus Garvey, which he did. At the same time, he was disbarred in 1925 by the French bar association. His movement was closely watched by French authorities and he was arrested without cause on numerous occasions. In 1925, he was blamed for an uprising in Dahomey and was forcibly exiled by the French authorities from the colony.

On a second tour of the United States in 1925, Houénou was asked to leave a Chicago restaurant because of his race. When he refused, the waiter phoned the police, who forcibly ejected Houénou from the restaurant. The situation, with Houénou arrested and his efforts to file a lawsuit against the police officers, was only resolved with the intervention of the French government. When leaving the U.S. at that point, Houénou was accompanied by Zulme Knowlton, the French wife of Harry N. Knowlton, a wealthy engineer. Harry and Zulme were in the middle of a divorce at the time and in later alimony hearings, Harry and his lawyers claimed that he did not owe alimony because his wife had traveled with and entertained an African. The court rejected the claim.

== Death ==
The later years of his life were spent in continued harassment and monitoring by French colonial authorities. Although he traveled to both Dahomey and France occasionally, he was not able to permanently settle in either because of the harassment. He met Roberta Dodd Crawford, a classical singer from Texas studying in Paris, and the two married in 1931. He spent much of his later years in Dakar, Senegal because he was exiled from both Dahomey and France on multiple occasions. He continued to be a focus for harassment and was arrested regularly without charge. He became active in Senegalese politics, mainly by organizing against Blaise Diagne, and campaigned unsuccessfully in the elections of 1928 and 1932.

He was arrested on charges of contempt of court in July 1936 in Dakar and died of typhoid fever while in prison.
