= Fact in Fiction =

2016 book by Kristin Eileen Stapleton

Fact in Fiction: 1920s China and Ba Jin's Family is a 2016 non-fiction book by Kristin Eileen Stapleton (Chinese name: 司昆仑 Sī Kūnlún), published by Stanford University Press.

It concerns historiographical aspects about The Family by Ba Jin, including Chengdu during the 20th century and the life of the author. The author stated that she wanted to explain what Chengdu was like in real life in Ba Jin's time and how that influenced his novel.

== Contents ==
Each of the chapters covers a theme, related to an occurrence in the novel or to a character. There are seven chapters in total.

Chapter 1, "Mingfeng: The Life of a Slave Girl," discusses the character Mingfeng, who is in an inferior position among the characters. It includes an English translation of a document titled "Slave Girl Contract from Chengdu, 1919".

Chapter 3 examines the census of Chengdu that was done in 1909.

There is no list of Chinese characters in this book.

Sebastian Veg of EHESS stated that the work re-explores some themes found in Civilizing Chengdu, another book by Stapleton.

== Release ==
In June 2019, the Sichuan Literature and Art Publishing House (Chinese: 四川文艺出版社; pinyin: Sìchuān Wényì Chūbǎnshè) published the Chinese version as "巴金《家》中的历史：20世纪20年代的成都社会".

== Reception ==
Shiamin Kwa (Chinese: 柯嘉敏; pinyin: Kē Jiāmǐn) of Bryn Mawr College stated that "for the most part, the details" featured in the book result in it being "a welcome classroom companion for Family." Kwa noted that there were some aspects of Chengdu not reflected in the novel.

Diana Lary of the University of British Columbia stated that the book is "beautiful", and "almost an improvement on the novels themselves."

Zhao Ma (Chinese: 马钊; pinyin: Mǎ Zhāo) of Washington University in St. Louis stated that the book "provides a wonderful window" into the subject.

Ronald Torrance of the University of Strathclyde stated that the book is "a highly detailed and rich study".

Veg wrote that it would "be of great interest" to people interested in the novel and to people interested in the Republic of China era of mainland China, and he also gave praise to the illustrations. Veg stated that compared to The Lost Geopoetic Horizon of Li Jieren, the work has a "a looser but equally engaging structure". Veg believed that the work would have been better with a Chinese character list.
