= Chen Tiejun =

Chinese revolutionary and feminist (1904–1928)

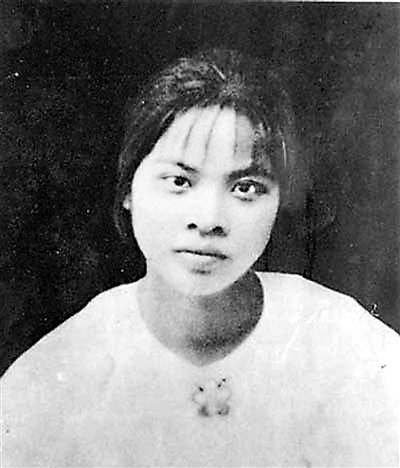
- Born: Chen Xiejun; March 1904; Foshan, Qing Dynasty
- Died: 6 February 1928 (aged 23); Guangzhou, Republic of China
- Cause of death: Execution by firing squad
- Political party: Chinese Communist Party
- Partner: Zhou Wenyong

Chen Tiejun (born Chen Xiejun; March 1904 – 6 February 1928) was a Chinese Communist Party revolutionary and feminist. She was executed by the Kuomintang alongside her partner Zhou Wenyong after participating in the failed Guangzhou Uprising.

== Biography ==
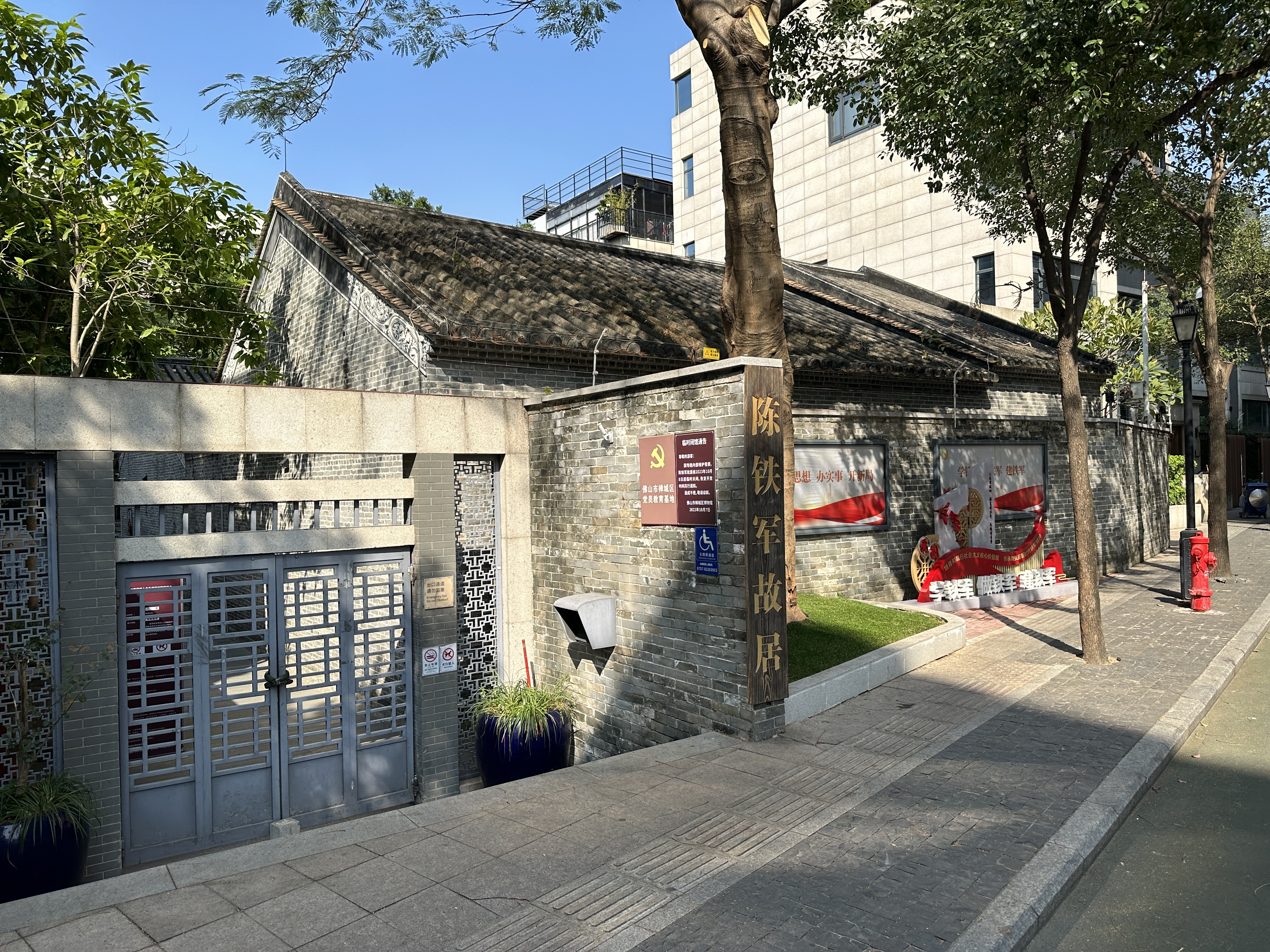
Former residence of Chen Tiejun in the Chancheng District of Foshan

Chen Tiejun was born as Chen Xiejun to a wealthy family in March 1904. At the age of 15 she took part in demonstrations in support of the May Fourth Movement in 1919. Her parents arranged a marriage for her to the son of a wealthy businessman, although they later separated.

In 1925, Chen Tiejun joined the May Thirtieth Movement after the killing of demonstrators in the Shanghai International Settlement. Chen Tiejun joined the Chinese Communist Party in April 1926 and was active in the party's Guangdong branch. She studied at Sun Yat-sen University until 1927, when the Kuomintang began a purge of communists known as the White Terror, forcing her to flee.

In October 1927, she was sent to Guangzhou with Zhou Wenyong posing as a married couple to prepare for the upcoming Guangzhou Uprising. After the failure of the uprising, they returned to Guangzhou to rebuild the party's underground organs, but were arrested on 27 January due to information provided by a Kuomintang informant. They were both tortured in prison but did not provide information to their captors.

Chen Tiejun was executed alongside Zhou Wenyong in Guangzhou on 6 February 1928. Before their execution they were photographed together at Zhou Wenyong's request, and Chen Tiejun proclaimed that the gunfire of their executioners would be their wedding salute. The Xuanyuan Blood Sacrifice Pavilion in the Guangzhou Martyrs' Memorial Garden was built in 1957 on the site of their execution, with a memorial stone inscribed by Dong Biwu.
