= Malian Football Federation =

Governing body of association football in Mali

CAF
- Founded: 1960
- FIFA affiliation: 1964
- CAF affiliation: 1963
- President: Mamoutou Toure
- Vice-President: Kassoum Coulibaly

The Malian Football Federation (French: Fédération Malienne de Football, FMF) is the governing body of football in Mali, organizing and governing all football leagues in the country. It joined CAF in 1963 and has been affiliated with FIFA since 1964. Its first general secretary was Garan Fabou Kouyate.

The federation bureau was dissolved in July 2005 due to the Malian national football team's poor performance during the FIFA World Cup and the African Nations Cup qualifying.

The federation was suspended by FIFA on 17 March 2017.

Its headquarters is in Bamako.
