= Civilizing Chengdu =

2000 book by Kristin Eileen Stapleton

Civilizing Chengdu: Chinese Urban Reform, 1895–1937 is a 2000 non-fiction book by Kristin Eileen Stapleton (Chinese name: 司昆仑 Sī Kūnlún), published by Harvard University Press.

The majority of the book covers how the Late Qing reforms and the City Administration Movement, the first from the Qing Dynasty and covering three chapters and the latter of the early Republic of China and covering one chapter, changed Chengdu. These efforts were done to develop a city perceived as backwards.

Hanchao Lu (traditional Chinese: 盧漢超; simplified Chinese: 卢汉超; pinyin: Lú Hànchāo) of the Georgia Institute of Technology stated that this was the first English-language "analytical "biography"" of Chengdu.

== Background ==
Gazeteers, guidebooks, and newspapers from times after 1900 and covering the historical era were used for sourcing. The author used sources stored in the First Historical Archive of China, Second Historical Archive of China, Sichuan's provincial archives, and Chengdu's prefectural archives.

== Release ==
In April 2020, the Sichuan Literature and Art Publishing House (Chinese: 四川文艺出版社; pinyin: Sìchuān Wényì Chūbǎnshè) published the Chinese version as "新政之后：警察、军阀与文明进程中的成都 (1895-1937)".

== Reception ==
Richard Belsky of Hunter College of the City University of New York stated that the work is a "must read" for people interested in the book's subject. He also praised the focus on Chengdu, a city smaller than others often covered in literature.

Alison Dray-Novey of College of Notre Dame (now Notre Dame of Maryland University) argued that the content was "interesting" for people studying the history of urban areas.

Chang-tai Hung stated that the work is "splendid" and that it was "clearly grounded in extensive archival and library research".

== See also ==
- Fact in Fiction - Another book by Stapleton
- Nation, Governance, and Modernity in China - A book about Guangzhou which Hanchao Lu describes as a similar sort of book to Civilizing Chengdu.
