= Nathaniel Clark Smith =

American musician and composer (1877–1935)

Major N. Clark Smith
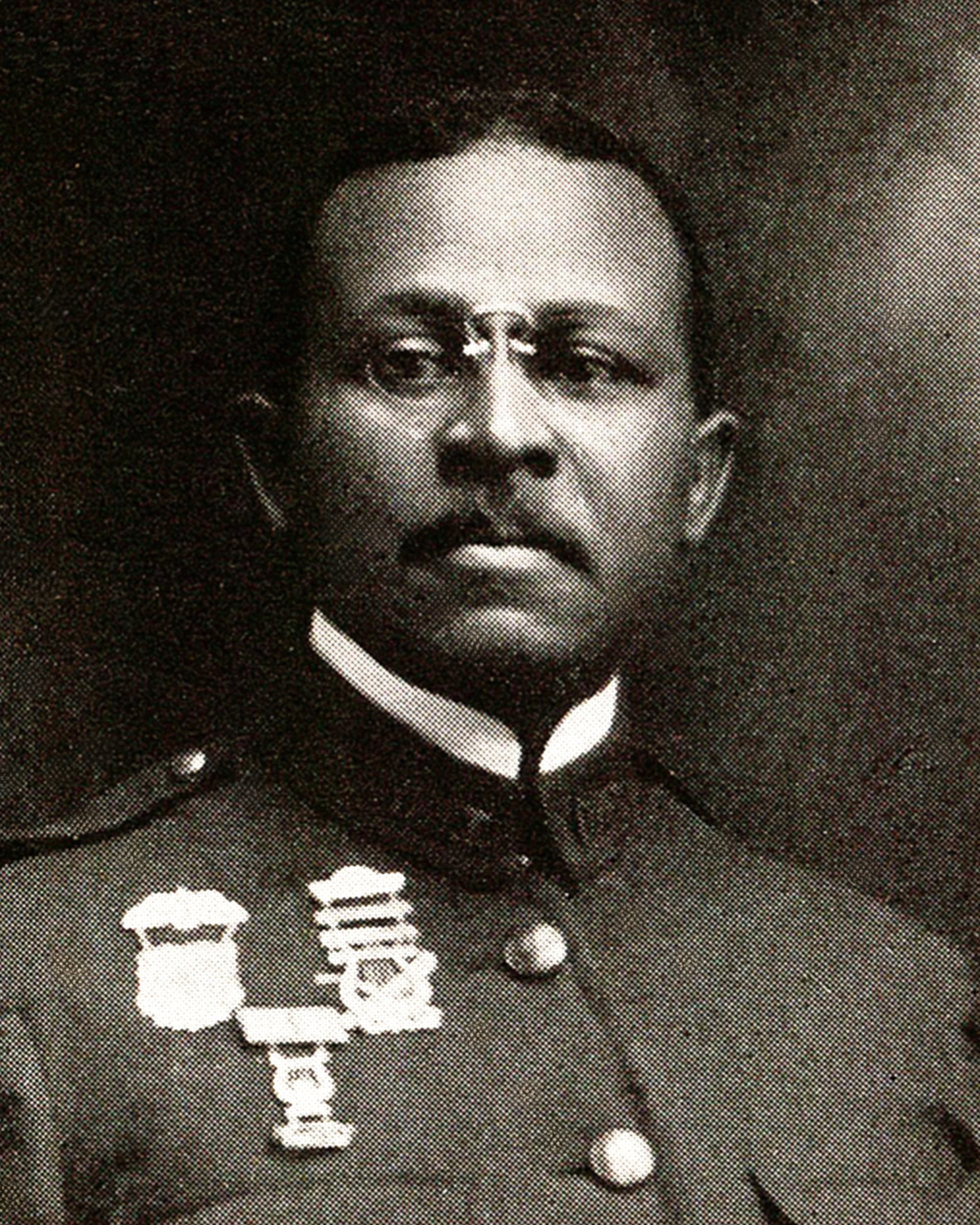

Background information
- Born: Nathaniel Clark Smith; July 31, 1877; Fort Leavenworth, Kansas, U.S.
- Died: October 8, 1935 (aged 58) Kansas City, Missouri, U.S.
- Genres: Jazz
- Occupations: Musician, educator
- Instrument: Trumpet

Nathaniel Clark Smith (often Major N. Clark Smith; July 31, 1877 – October 8, 1935) was an important African-American musician, composer, and music educator in the United States during the early decades of the 1900s. Born on the Army base at Fort Leavenworth, Kansas, Smith began his music education very early organizing bands in Wichita starting in 1893. His strict military style leadership led to prominence and over the next 30 years he would lead bands in Chicago, Wichita, Kansas City, the Tuskegee Institute, and in St. Louis. He was an important educator for many of the prominent early Jazz musicians from Kansas City, Chicago, and St. Louis. He died in 1935 as the result of a stroke. Many primary documents about Smith's life have been lost as a result of a fire that destroyed most of his personal documents.

== Early life ==
Nathaniel Clark Smith was born July 31, 1877 (or possibly in 1866) in Fort Leavenworth, Kansas to Dan and Maggie Smith. His father was an Army Trumpeter at the fort. His mother was half Cherokee. At Fort Leavenworth, he learned music under the German bandleader H.E. Gungle who identified Smith's talent and encouraged him to continue his musical education. After finishing formal education, he worked briefly in Kansas City in the publishing industry before beginning service in the Army at Fort Sill, Oklahoma as an Army trumpeter in 1891. However, eye problems prevented him from pursuing a military career, so he moved with his wife, Laura Smith (née Lawson), to Wichita, Kansas in 1893.

Smith claimed that his father knew Frederick Douglass and that at the age of eight the younger Smith accompanied Douglass in playing the famous Negro spiritual, and song that would become a famous arrangement of Smith's, Steal Away to Jesus.

== Bandleader ==
Wherever he moved, Smith would organize a variety of different bands and choirs. These included beginner bands, youth touring bands, choral societies, and even symphony orchestras. He began organizing bands in Wichita where one of the bands was selected to attend the 1893 Chicago World's Fair. While in Chicago with the band Smith signed an agreement with Lyon & Healy to work in their music publications division by organizing a number of bands and choruses. For this job, he moved to Chicago where he started a number of bands. In addition, he led the band for the Eighth Illinois Infantry unit for four years. During this time, he went with the infantry unit to the front lines in the Spanish–American War where he met Theodore "Teddy" Roosevelt at the Battle of San Juan Hill. His military rank and promotion during this period are not precisely clear, however, it is generally contended that during this period he achieved the rank of Major in the United States Army. While living in Chicago he studied at the Chicago Musical College, where he had to register as a "private student" to attend classes at the otherwise all white school. It was during this time in Chicago that his daughter Anna was born.

He returned to Kansas City in 1898 in order to lead a youth band on an 18-month tour of Europe and Australia which would include a performance at the 1900 Paris Exposition. After touring, Smith returned and continued forming and leading bands in Chicago and Wichita until 1905. In that year, Teddy Roosevelt convinced him to become the bandleader at the Tuskegee Institute led by Booker T. Washington. To honor his new institution, he composed the Tuskegee Institute March. After eight years at the Tuskegee Institute, Smith decided to leave because of a rumored disagreement between him and Washington about the number of plantation songs in his orchestral arrangements. Once again, his connection with Teddy Roosevelt led him to accept a position to head the military and music departments at the Western Baptist University in Kansas City in 1913. His rigorous instruction and strong results led to Smith leaving the university to join the Lincoln High School in Kansas City in 1916. Although his instruction was quite strict, he began encouraging students to experiment with the developing new musical genre of Jazz. He moved again in 1922 to become the bandleader at the Wendell Phillips Academy High School in Chicago. At each place he moved, Smith was noted for organizing many bands in the area including the first African-American symphony orchestra, a number of women's choruses and bands, and youth bands (including the Chicago Defender's Newsboys Band, which included a young Lionel Hampton).

In 1931, he moved again to begin teaching at Sumner High School in St. Louis, Missouri. Although he continued organizing a number of community bands and musical societies, it was in St. Louis that his work achieved the most wide success. His composition Negro Folk Suite won the Wannamaker Prize in 1932 and was performed by the St. Louis Symphony Orchestra that same year. During the same period, CBS Radio broadcast a weekly program from 1933 until 1935 titled St. Louis Blues with Smith as the bandleader.

== Death and legacy ==
Smith returned to Kansas City in 1935. After attending the Joe Louis versus King Levinsky boxing match in Chicago in August 1935 and returning home to Kansas City, he suffered a stroke. He died on October 8, 1935.

The University of Missouri-Kansas City page about Smith calls him "America's Greatest Colored Bandmaster" and his legacy was significant on African-American music and particularly on jazz. He was very rigorous and strict with his musical instruction. One student, Harlan Leonard explained that Smith was "short, gruff, military in bearing, wore glasses and was never without his full uniform and decorations. His language was rather rough and occasionally shocking to the few young ladies who were taking music classes, though never offensive." The students he instructed who went on to have significant musical careers include:

- Lammar Wright, Sr.
- Harlan Leonard
- Walter Page
- Eddie Cole, brother of Nat King Cole and Ike Cole
- Lionel Hampton
- Milt Hinton
- Ray Nance
- Jimmy Forrest
- Jessalyn Coleman
- Roberta Dodd Crawford
- Quinn Wilson
- Hayes Alvis
- Ernie Wilkins
- Pauline James Lee – who would become the President of the Chicago University of Music

Smith composed almost 100 works and many of these and his other arrangements are notable. Many involved creating musical accompaniment for Negro spirituals and plantation songs. The list of notable compositions include:

- Steal Away to Jesus
- Frederick Douglass Funeral March
- Tuskegee Institute March
- Negro Folk Suite

In addition, he wrote a number of pieces on music practice. This included a weekly column for The Call Newspaper and two books:

- The Elements of Music
- New Jubilee Songs for Quartette, Choir or Chorus
