= Garan Fabou Kouyate =

Malian civil and social figure

Garan Fabou Kouyaté
- Born: April 25, 1925; Segou, French Sudan (French West Africa)
- Died: April 1, 2016; Bamako, Mali
- Other names: "Ba Garan" (Bambara term for father Garan)
- Occupation: Civil administrator
- Known for: Soccer and civil society in Mali
- Title: El-Hajj
- Board member of: Ligue de Football de l'AOF, Ligue Régionale de Football de Ségou, Malian Football Federation, Comité National des Sports du Mali, Association Malienne pour l'Unité et le Progrès de l'Islam

Garan Fabou Kouyaté (April 25, 1925 - April 1, 2016) was a Malian civil and social figure. He was a member of Mali's Association for Unity and the Progress of Islam (AMUPI), Director of Mali's first Islamic radio La Voix du Coran et du Hadith and a member of Mali's National Independent Electoral Commission (CENI) as representative of religious associations. Prior to that civil society career, he was very much involved with soccer, having been referee, founder and first President of the Ligue Régionale de Football de Ségou, and founding member and Vice-Chair of Referee Commission of Malian Football Federation. He was commonly called "Ba Garan" (Bambara term for father Garan).

== Early life ==
Garan Fabou Kouyaté is from a Griot or Djeli family (West African traditional story tellers, singers, and mediators). He is the son of Fabou and Fatoumata Kouyaté and the cousin of labor organizer, communist and anti-imperialist militant Tiemoko Garan Kouyaté. Garan Fabou Kouyaté did his primary education in the 1930s in the city of Bamako in French Sudan and graduated in mid-1940s as a civil administrator. He served in Segou, Nioro, Bafoulabé, Sikasso, and Bamako.

== Sport ==
Kouyaté was mostly renown in sport, especially soccer although his first hobby was bicycling and the Tour de France. He was a soccer referee, being the first official referee from French Sudan in the 1940s, and then a soccer administrator. As a member of the Association Sportive de Segou (ASS) and General secretary of Middle Sudan district (which includes Segou) from 1947 to 1959, Kouyaté strongly promoted soccer in the Segou Region during the annual Coupe de l’AOF (soccer competition between teams in French West Africa during the 1950s). Although no team from the region made it to the final, Kouyaté was successful in making Segou a second major soccer center in the French Sudan after the capital Bamako.

From 1950 to 1960, he served as one of three delegates of French Sudan in the Ligue de Football de l'AOF in Dakar. After the independence of Mali in 1960, Mr. Kouyaté was the first President of the Ligue Régionale de Football de Ségou and a founding member of the Malian Football Federation. Besides, he was the General secretary of the National Sports Committee of Mali, and led Mali's teams during the African Games of 1965 in Brazzaville, Congo as well as various friendship sport events in the Soviet Union, the Socialist Federal Republic of Yugoslavia, East Germany, and the People's Republic of China.

Kouyaté remained at the Malian Football Federation until 1974, where he was also Vice-Chair of the Referee Committee. He got into feuds with Tiécoro Bagayoko, then prominent member of the ruling military junta in Mali and who was a notorious fan of Djoliba AC. Kouyaté was briefly arrested and removed from all football positions. Ironically, following Tiécoro Bagayoko's own arrest in 1978 (from internal conflict among junta members) and crisis within the Malian Football Federation (including Mali's being suspended by CAF for Tiécoro's involvement in games), Kouyaté was re-called to be President of the Provisional National Committee.

== Politics ==
Kouyaté had a brief political career from the 1950s to early 1960. His family house in Segou hosted several informal RDA meetings from its creation in 1946 to the late 1950s before independence, and he had since befriended with many political leaders, including Guinea's future President Ahmed Sékou Touré. As a former student of Modibo Keita, he was very active in the promotion of US-RDA in Segou. He played an important role in US-RDA's 1957 decisive victory over Fily Dabo Sissoko's PSP. Later, there were some disagreements between him and the Segou's US-RDA representatives due to his "No" position in the 1958 French constitutional referendum in French West Africa. Further disagreements about the candidacies of delegates for party sections in Segou made him retired from politics.

== Later period ==
After retiring for civil and sport activities, Mr. Kouyaté joined the Malian Association for Unity and the Progress of Islam (AMUPI) in 1980. In 1994, he was appointed director of the radio station of AMUPI, La Voix du Coran et du Hadith, Mali's first islamic and religious radio station. In 1997, he was selected as representative of Mali's Muslim community to the National Independent Electoral Committee (CENI) and again in 2001 on behalf of all religious community.

Kouyaté was a very respected and well-known man in Mali. He served as honorary consultant for writers, historians, and biographers on Mali and West Africa's historical and cultural past. He was regularly called for advice in formal issues and in local mediation. He retired from formal activities in late-2000s due to his old age and health issues. He died on his bed on April 1, 2016, in his house in Bamako, Mali. He was buried, according to his wish, in his beloved hometown Segou, following an official funeral service by a unit of Mali's army based in Segou attended by three Government ministers and the Governor of Segou.

== Distinctions ==
He received several sports-related awards, including Silver Medal of Football Liague of French West Africa (Médaillé d'argent de la Ligue de Football de l'Afrique-Occidentale française) in 1955, National Order of Sports Merit in 1957, Honorary Referee of the Malian Football Federation in 1967, and Diploma of International Olympic Committee in 2001.

Additionally, he was awarded a Knight of the National Order of Mali in 1974, an Officer in 2002, and in 2009 he became Grand Officer of the Order.
