= Guangzhou Martyrs' Memorial Garden =

Park in China

- 广州起义烈士陵园
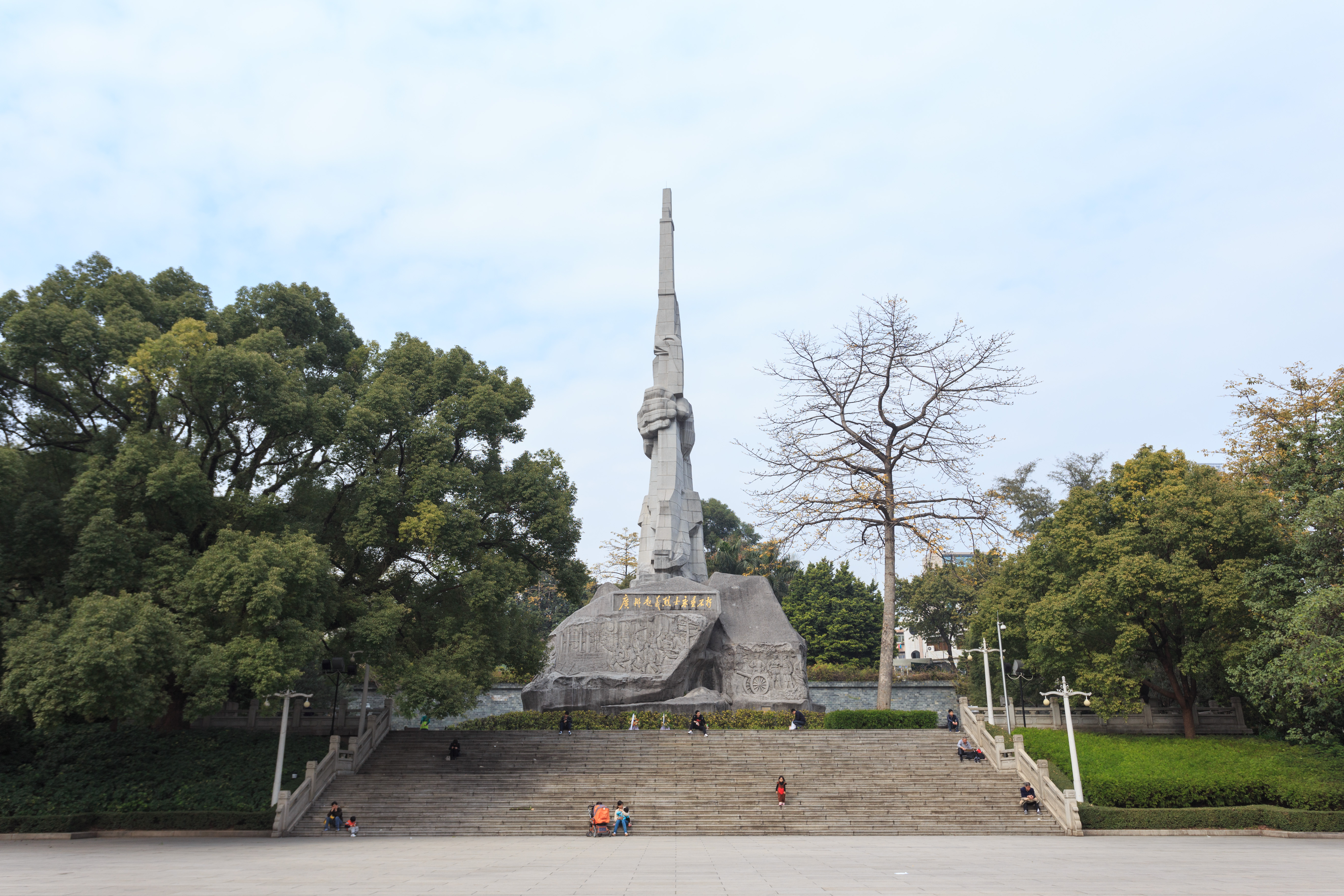

- Location within Guangdong
- Type: Public
- Location: Guangzhou, China
- Coordinates: 23°7′55″N 113°16′43″E
- Area: 64.24 acres (26.00 ha)
- Created: 1957
- Status: Open year round

Guangzhou Martyrs' Memorial Garden
- Simplified Chinese: 广州起义烈士陵园
- Traditional Chinese: 廣州起義烈士陵園
Transcriptions
Standard Mandarin
- Hanyu Pinyin: Guǎngzhōu Qǐyì Lièshì Língyuán
Yue: Cantonese
- Jyutping: gwong2 zau1 hei2 ji6 lit6 si6 ling4 jyun4

Guangzhou Martyrs' Memorial Garden is a park located in Zhongshan 3rd Road, Guangzhou, Guangdong, China that commemorates the fallen members of the Chinese Communist Party in the Guangzhou Uprising against the Kuomintang on December 11, 1927.

== History ==
Construction of the park started in 1954 and finished in 1957 to commemorate the 30th anniversary of the Guangzhou Uprising. The door on the stone wall was engraved with the text "Guangzhou uprising martyrs cemetery" by China's first prime minister Zhou Enlai.

There is currently a station for the Guangzhou Metro Line 1 in front of the park.

== Gallery ==
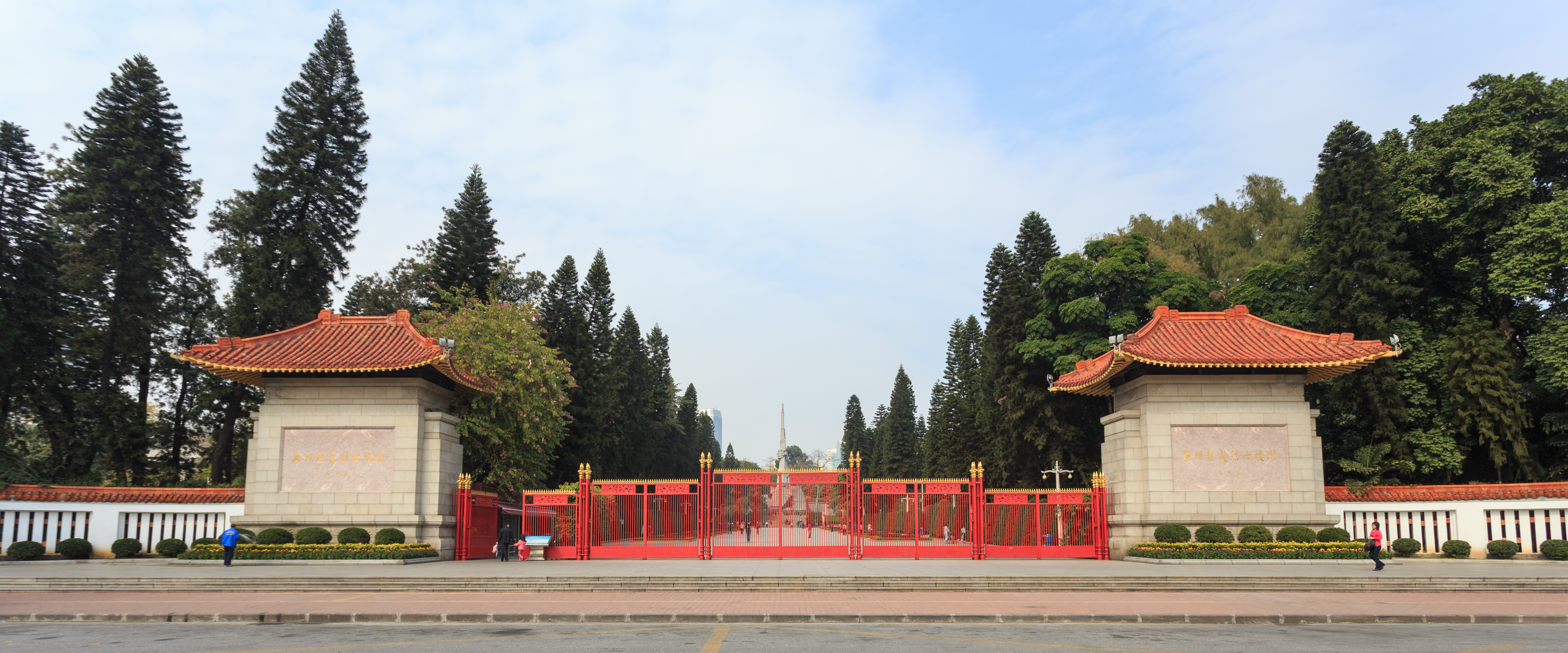
Main Entrance

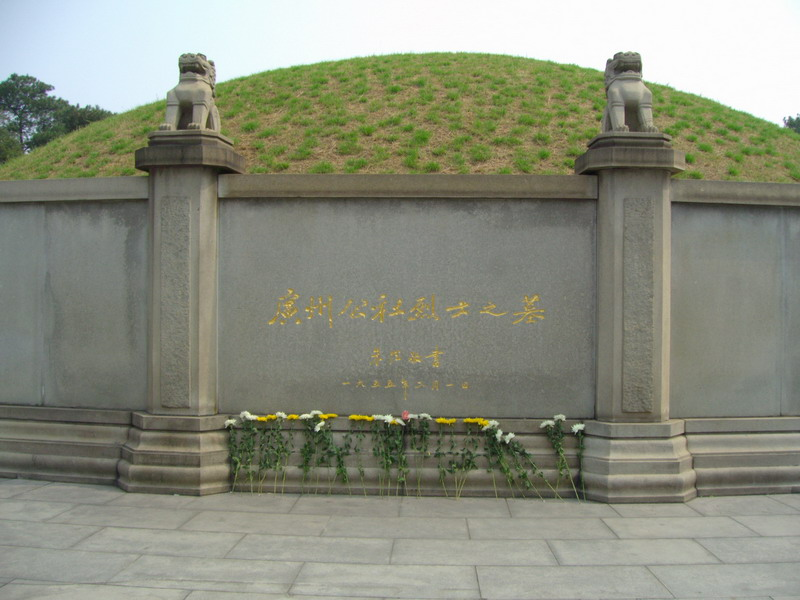
Guangzhou commune martyrs tomb

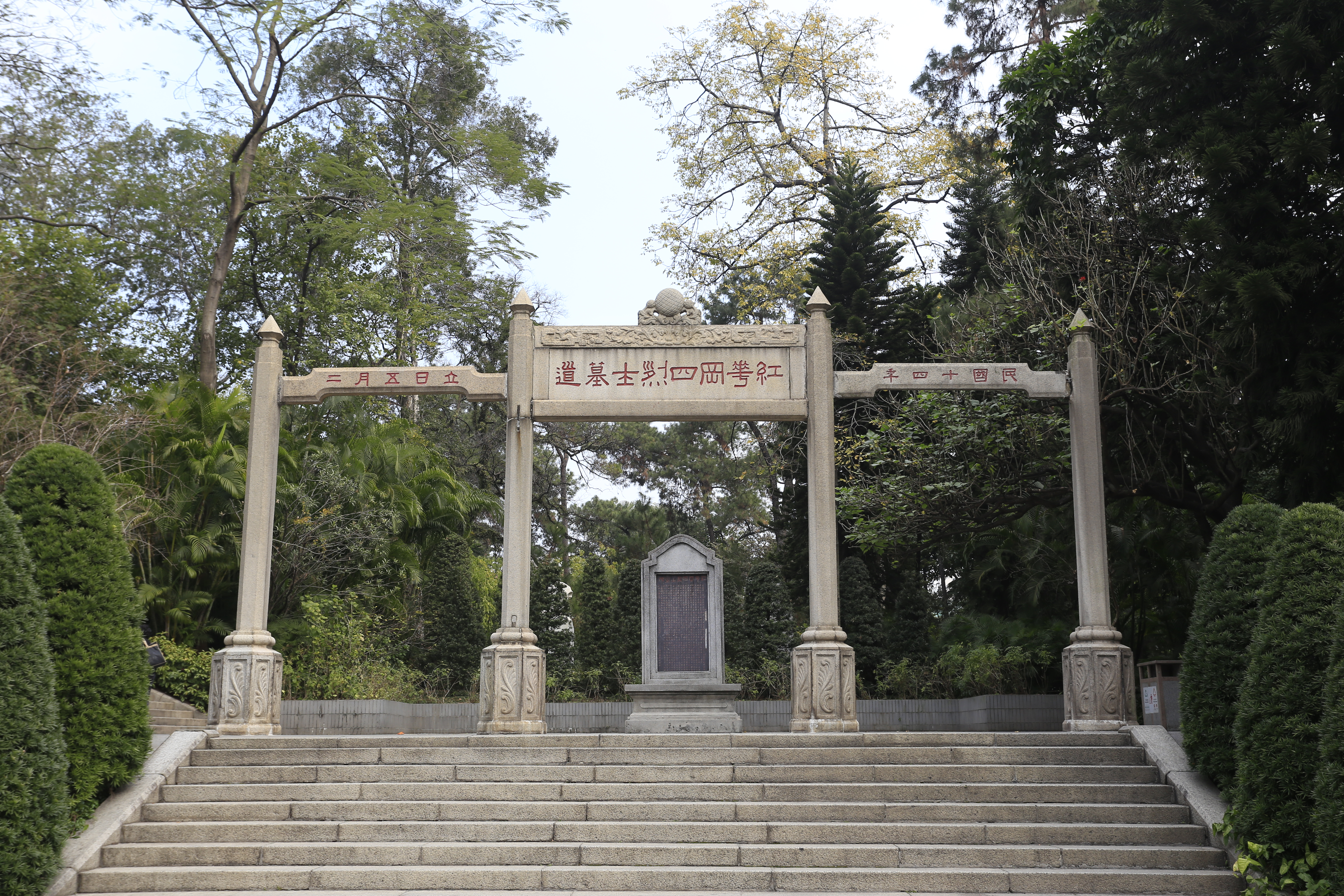
Honghuagang four martyrs tomb

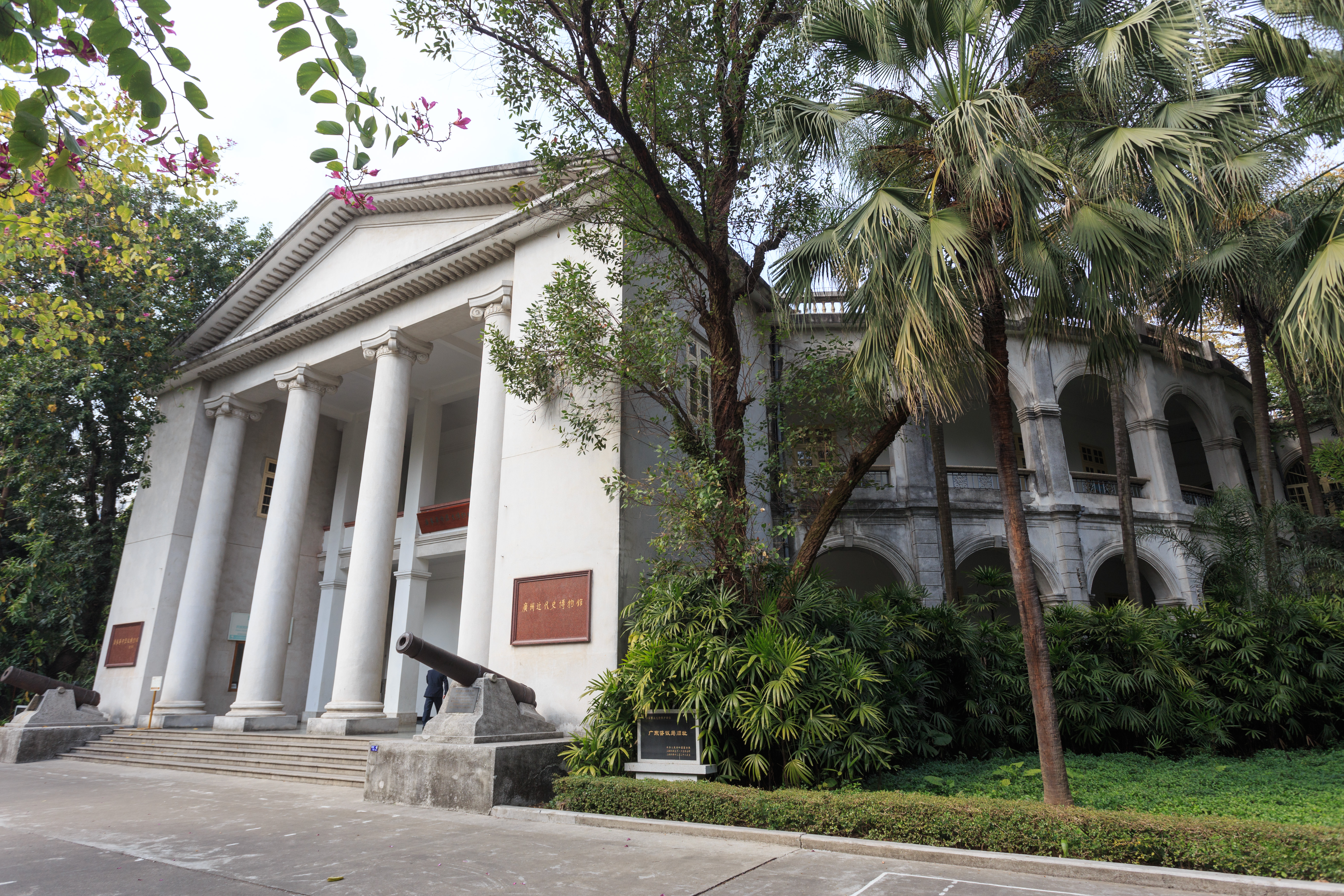
Guangdong Revolutionary History Museum

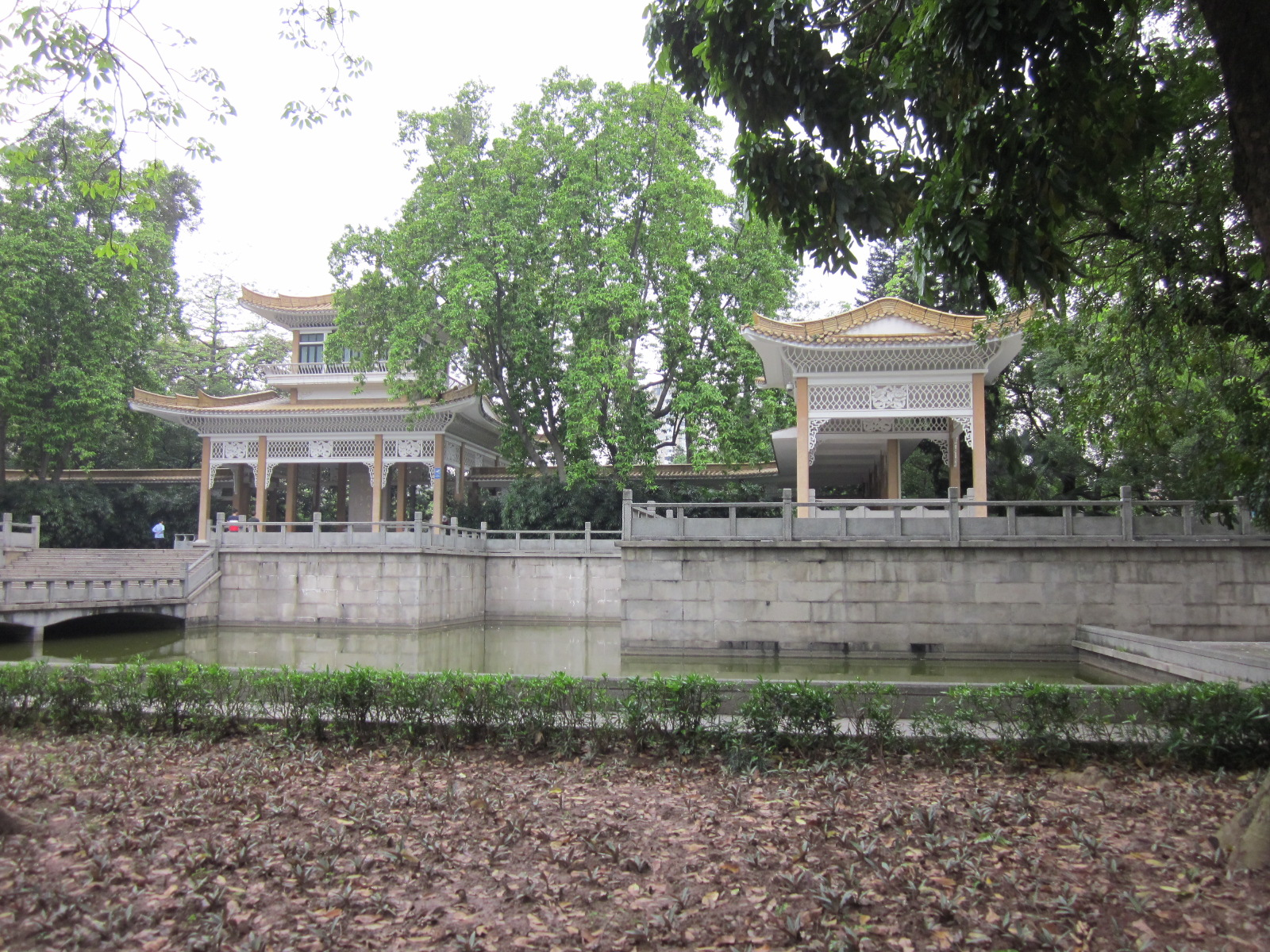
Chinese and Korean people blood pagoda

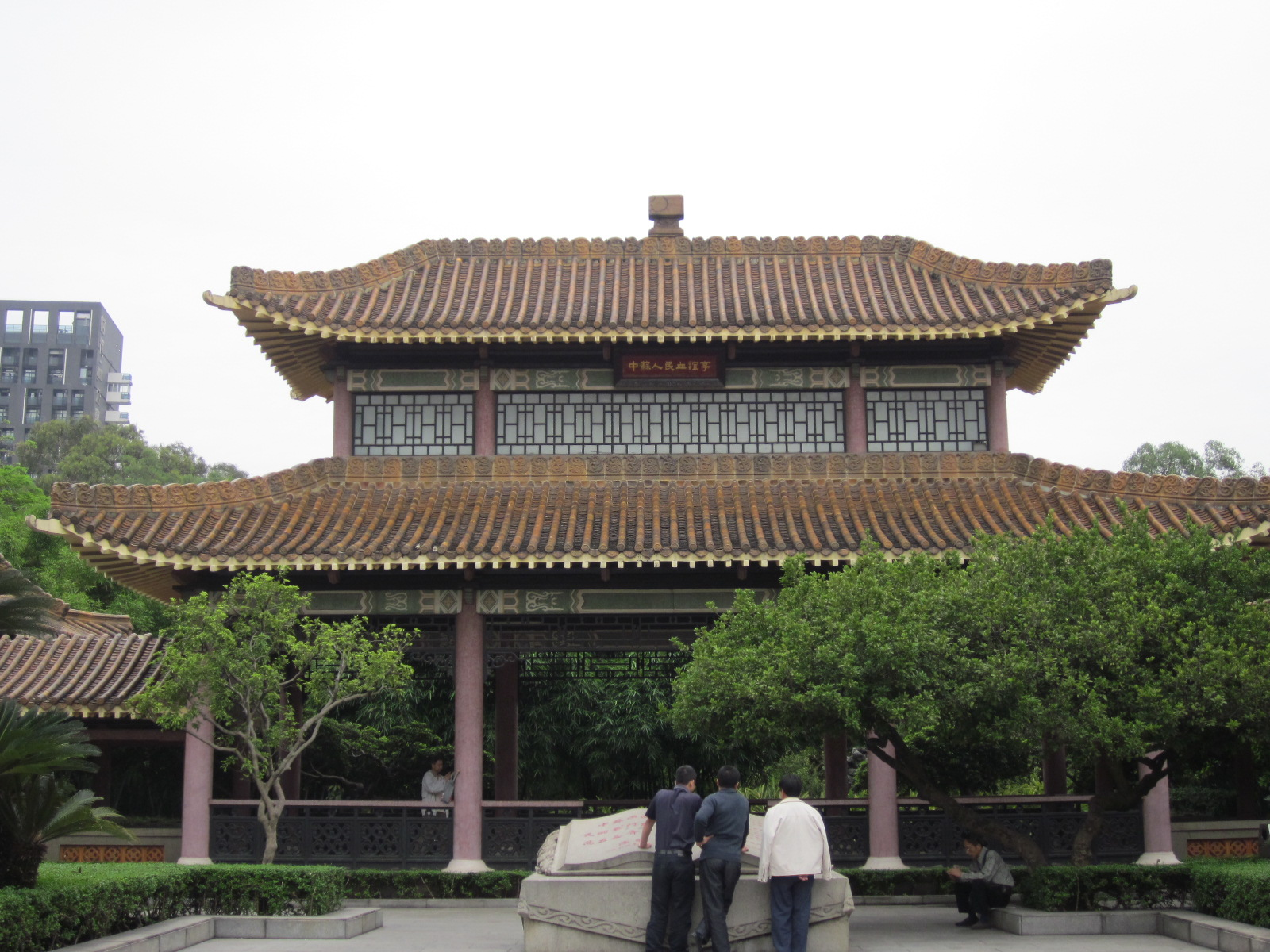
Blood sacrifice Xuanyuan Pavilion

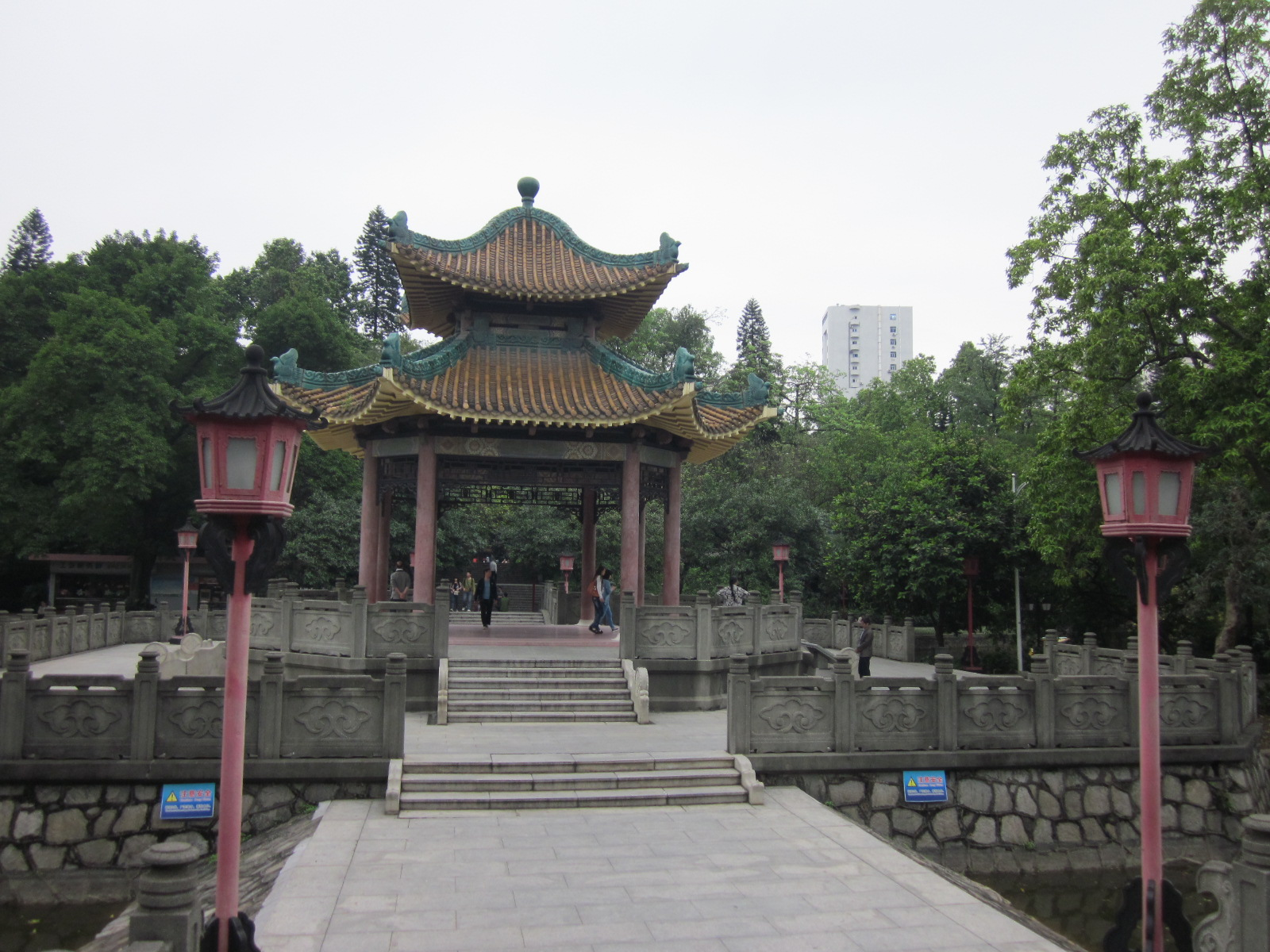
Chinese and Soviet people blood Pagoda
