= Tiemoko Garan Kouyaté =

French Sudanese communist (1902–1942)

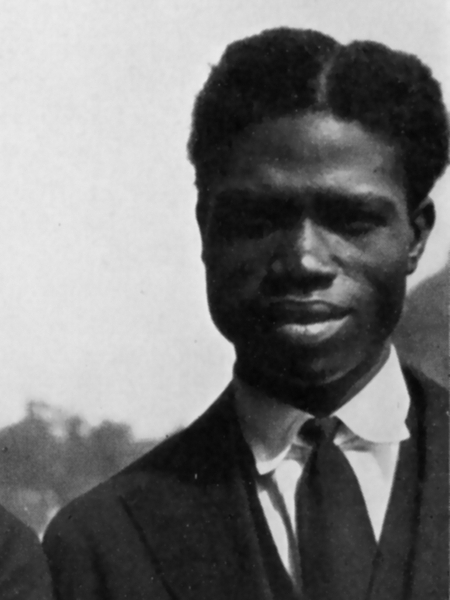
Kouyaté in 1929

Tiemoko Garan Kouyaté (April 27, 1902-1942) was a Malian teacher, journalist and political activist. He was a pioneer for African nationalism and one of the first Communists in Africa.

== Early life, education and migration ==
He was born in Ségou, French Soudan. Kouyaté was regarded as the most influential personality among the West African migrant community in France according to French intelligence assessments. Kouyaté was also among the first generation of Western-educated Africans in French Soudan. He was from the Bambara ethnic group of Mali. He was first educated at a primary school in Bamako, the capital of Mali. Kouyaté arrived in France after he was awarded a scholarship to further his studies at the Ecole Normale at Aix en Provence.

== Creation of the Ligue de Defense de la Race Nègre ==
In 1926 Kouyaté, alongside Lamine Senghor, a Senegalese nationalist and World War I veteran, created the Ligue de Defense de la Race Nègre (the League for the Defense of the Negro Race, or LDRN). It was one of the most important pan-African political movements to emerge from interwar Paris. A key characteristic of the LDRN is that it demanded full citizenship for all colonial subjects and was funded by the French Communist Party. Kouyaté took over the direction of the LDRN after the death of Senghor a year after its creation. Assuming the role of secretary general, he constructed a program that called for the independence of African colonies and the establishment of socialism in Africa. Under Kouyaté’s leadership, the league supported Garveyism and the United States National Association for the Advancement of Colored People. On interactions with W.E.B. Du Bois, famous African American leader on April 29, 1929, he described the aim of the league as “the political, economic, moral, and intellectual emancipation of the whole of the Negro race. It is a matter of winning back, all honorable means, the national independence of the Negro peoples in the colonial territories of France, England, Belgium, Italy, Spain, Portugal…and of setting up in Black Africa a great Negro state.” Consequently, in 1927 and 1928, La Race Nègre. published articles of cultural interest about blacks in the United states as well as the cultural achievements of Africans throughout history and the eyewitness accounts of abuses committed by the colonial administrators. French colonial authorities considered the LDRN a dangerous and inflammatory organization and banned La Race Nègre in the colonies. Kouyaté was under close watch by French authorities after the Colonial Ministry requested background information on him. This led to information on him being dispatched in the French West African monthly propaganda reports.

== German travels ==
After attending a conference in Frankfurt at the end of July in 1929, he visited Berlin, where his contact with Wilhelm Münzenberg, German Communist political activist and publisher, allowed him to gain access to the African community there. There he was present at the inaugural meeting of the Liga zur Verteidigung der Negerrasse, formally a section of the Paris association and closely tied to Münzenbergs Liga gegen Imperialismus. The Liga was an important organisation of the Black German community until it disintegrated with the rise of Nazism and was terminated finally in 1935.

== A new organisation ==
In 1931 the League for the Defense of the Negro Race, acquiring a new leader split. This led to the creation of the Union des Travailleurs Nègres (Union of the Negro Workers), an association made up of both communists and ex-communists. From this emerged a new journal titled Le Cri des Nègres (Cry of the Negroes). The magazine focused on the poor treatment of Black people globally and published an article by the Guadeloupian communist Stephane Rosso where he described the Scottsboro rape trial in the United States and the deaths of Africans in the construction of the Congo-Ocean railroad. The article reached Dakar in Senegal almost immediately.

== Banishment by the French Communist Party ==
Kouyaté was banished from the French Communist Party as well as the Union Des Travailleurs Nègres in October 1933. After being accused of being in contact with enemies of the revolutionary trade union movement and of not responding to requests for justification, Kouyaté’s name and photograph were published in the Communist Party’s blacklist which explained he was “kicked out of the party for being anti-communist, indelicacy and having a disaggregated attitude”.

In 1935, Kouyaté wrote a letter to the Ethiopian leader, Haile Selassie where he pledged to do everything possible, including the provision of material support, to defend the country against the Italian invasion. As part of the movement against the war and the occupation of Ethiopia by fascist Italy, Kouyaté also participated in the founding of the Ethiopian Defense Committee, going as far as writing articles on the country in El Ouma, the organization’s journal. In addition to that, he organized protests against the Italian invasion of Ethiopia. In December 1935, he created a monthly magazine named Africa in which he used to continue his campaign for the independence of the colonies and call for the reforms for the benefit of Africans.

== Death ==
The specific circumstances surrounding the death of Tiemoko Garan Kouyaté’s are uncertain. One theory believes that he was entrusted with money for propaganda by the Germans but kept it for himself leading to his demise during the Nazi occupation of France.
