= All-America Anti-Imperialist League =

International mass organization of Communist International

Leaflet promoting a December 1928 membership meeting of the All-America Anti-Imperialist League in New York City.

The All-America Anti-Imperialist League (also known as Anti-Imperialist League of the Americas, Spanish: Liga Antiimperialista de las Americas (LADLA)) was an international mass organization of Communist International established in 1925 to organize against American and European commercial expansion and military intervention in Central America, South America, and the Caribbean.

The organization was terminated in 1933 and replaced by a new Communist Party-sponsored group, the American League Against War and Fascism.

== History ==
=== Background ===
In the early 1920s, many Communist Parties affiliated with the Communist International (Comintern) maintained "Anti-Imperialist Departments" dedicated to building broad coalitions in opposition to the economic and military intervention of capitalist powers in the affairs of smaller colonial nations. In the Western hemisphere this took the form of organizing against the expansion of American commercial influence in the developing nations of Central and South America as well as the Caribbean basin, including especially Mexico, the Dominican Republic, Cuba, and Nicaragua.

In the United States itself, the Anti-Imperialist Department of the well-funded Workers (Communist) Party of America was Charles Shipman (1895–1989), a draft-resisting American expatriate to Mexico who as "Jesús Ramírez" had been a delegate representing that country at the 2nd World Congress of the Comintern. In addition to Latin American concerns, Shipman's department had also propagandized against American commercial and military involvement in other parts of the globe, including particularly the Philippines and China.

=== Establishment ===
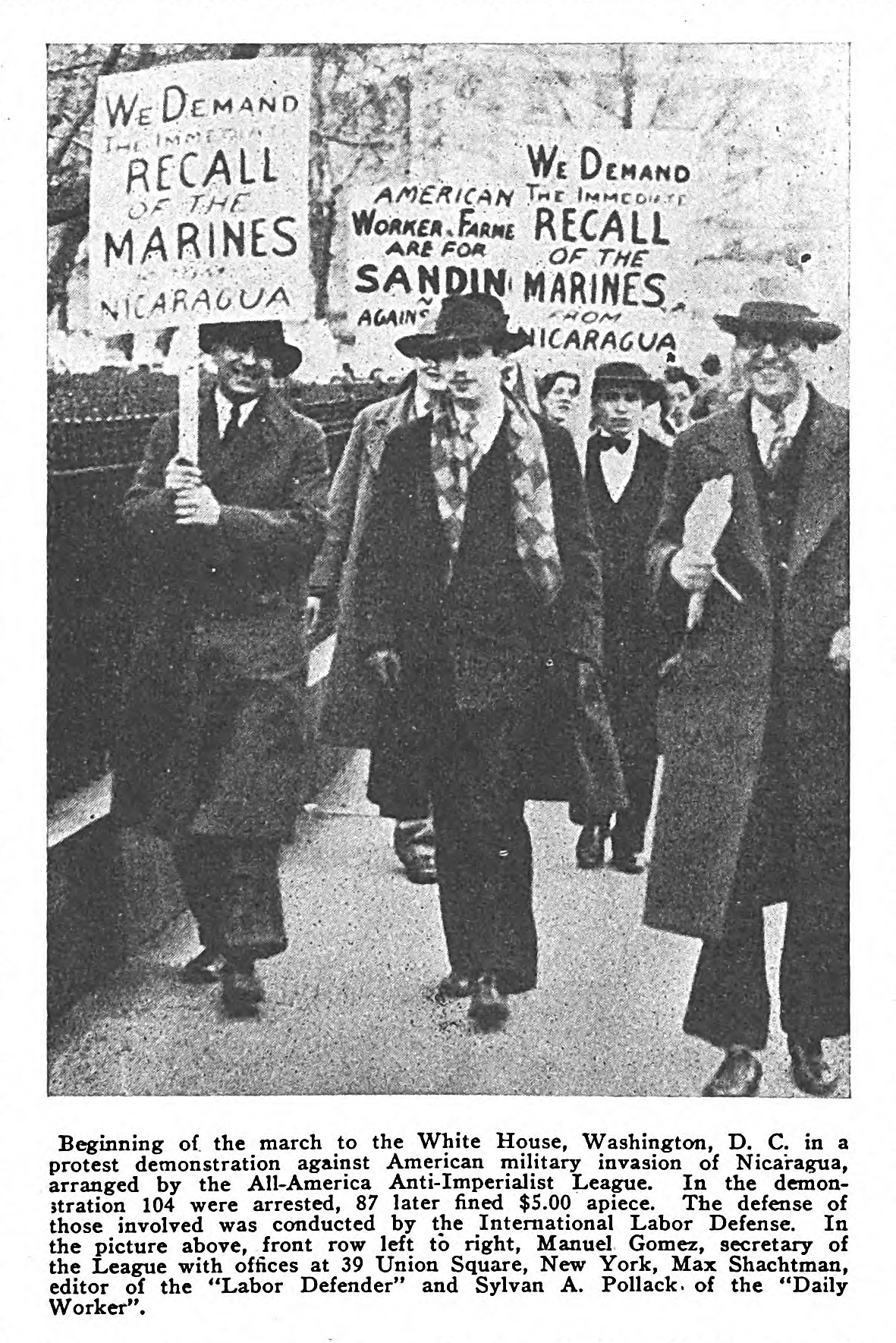
Labor Defender, June 1928

In April 1925 Shipman was dispatched to Mexico as the representative of the Workers Party to the 3rd Congress of the Communist Party of Mexico. It was at this time that a new international organization was launched, the All-America Anti-Imperialist League — an organization which would eventually include national sections throughout Latin America. The term "All-America" in the organizational moniker was not intended to relate specifically to the United States, but rather to the fact that the organization included sections from throughout the Americas.

Although itself an international group, the All-American Anti-Imperialist League was in turn attached to another Comintern-sponsored international organization, the League Against Imperialism. This federation included other similar regional organizations to the All-American Anti-Imperialist League, groups engaged in parallel activity in other parts of the world.

=== Development ===
In the United States Charles Shipman was named as Secretary of the American Section of the All-American Anti-Imperialist League and given the task of formally organizing units of the new group. Speakers were sent to trade union locals in an effort to stir up interest but the effort was largely futile, with these representatives generally denied admission. The cause was more successfully promoted in the labor press, however, with the Communist-controlled Federated Press news service providing substantial coverage of the organizing effort.

The organizing effort benefited from a sizable donation by wealthy Chicago liberal William H. Holly, and a number of prominent public figures allowed their names to be used on the group's letterhead to bolster fundraising, including NAACP executive William Pickens, civil liberties activist Roger Baldwin, literary critic Lewis Gannett, and public intellectuals Robert Morss Lovett and Arthur Garfield Hays. These friendly non-communist figures were joined in the public spotlight by a number of well-known public figures who maintained Workers Party membership, including writer Scott Nearing and trade union official William Z. Foster.

In later years the All-America Anti-Imperialist League was known simply as the "Anti-Imperialist League." The organization maintained its headquarters in a single room located at 32 Union Square, New York City, part of a suite occupied by the Communist-sponsored literary magazine, The New Masses. Membership in the American Section of the league was through payment of annual dues of $1 — although donations of $10 from those with the means to pay were actively solicited.

=== Kellogg Statement ===
On January 13, 1927, Secretary of State Frank B. Kellogg garnered front-page headlines across America when he presented an extensive statement to the Foreign Affairs Committee of the United States Senate. Kellogg depicted the All-American Anti-Imperialist League as the bulwark of Soviet revolutionism in the Western Hemisphere.

Kellogg told the assembled Senators: "The Bolshevik leaders have very definite ideas with respect to the role which Mexico and Latin America are to play in their general program of world revolution. Thus, Latin America and Mexico are conceived as a base for activities against the United States." He pointedly noted the Mexican focus of operations of the All-American Anti-Imperialist League, publishing center of the international organization.

=== 1927 Brussels Congress ===
In February 1927, Secretary of the American Section Charles Shipman other national leaders of the Anti-Imperialist League were made a delegate to an international convention in Brussels sponsored by the Communist International, called the Congress Against Colonial Oppression and Imperialism.

=== Termination ===
In 1933 the All-America Anti-Imperialist League was formally terminated and a new organization launched in its stead, the American League Against War and Fascism. The new organization focused instead on the developing political situation in Europe, attempting to build a Popular Front in opposition to fascist Germany and Italy.
