= Nation, Governance, and Modernity in China =

Nation, Governance, and Modernity in China: Canton, 1900-1927 is a 1999 non-fiction book by Michael Tsang-Woon Tsin, published by Stanford University Press.

The book describes competing attempts by the Chinese Communist Party and the Kuomintang to build a "society and nation" (社會國家) society in Guangzhou in the early 20th Century.

Hanchao Lu (traditional Chinese: 盧漢超; simplified Chinese: 卢汉超; pinyin: Lú Hànchāo) of the Georgia Institute of Technology stated that this was the first English-language "analytical "biography"" of Guangzhou.

== Background ==
The work originated as a PhD thesis at Princeton University, published in 1990.

Tsin worked for Columbia University as an associate professor. After publication of the book, he moved to the University of Florida.

Many primary sources came from the People's Republic of China. They included documents from the two political parties and the British Foreign Office, as well as memoirs. The secondary sources used for research were written in Chinese, English, and Japanese. Some secondary sources came from the Western countries. The works describing theory were also sourced from Western countries.

== Contents ==
The book discusses the Xinhai Revolution, the 1922 seamen's strike, the Canton Merchants' Corps Uprising, and the Canton-Hong Kong strike.

Roger R. Thompson of Stanford University stated that the book "tries to escape the straitjacket of both [KMT] and CCP historiography".

== Reception ==
Charlotte Beahan of Murray State University praised the sourcing and the content about theory, while she felt the narrative aspect was not as strong.

Ryan Dunch of the University of Alberta praised the "fascinating detail" about the subject. He felt that people not already familiar with the subject may have some trouble comprehending the book since the work "assumes some familiarity with Guangdong local history", and he stated that the some narration of events Dunch described as "dramatic" were done "laconically".

Joan Judge of University of California, Santa Barbara described the book as "elegantly written and meticulously researched" and she praised the "success in bringing social-historical and theoretical analysis together".

Thompson stated that the book is "a worthy addition" to its field.

== See also ==
- Civilizing Chengdu - A book about Chengdu which Hanchao Lu describes as a similar sort of book to Nation, Governance, and Modernity in China.
