= League Against Imperialism and Colonial Oppression =

Transnational anti-imperialist organisation of the interwar period

The League Against Imperialism and Colonial Oppression (French: Ligue contre l'impérialisme et l'oppression coloniale; German: Liga gegen Kolonialgreuel und Unterdrückung) was a transnational anti-imperialist organisation in the interwar period. It has also been referred to as the League of Oppressed People, and the World Anti-Imperialist League, or simply and confusingly under the misnomer Anti-Imperialist League.

It was established in the Egmont Palace in Brussels, Belgium, on 10 February 1927, in presence of 175 delegates from around the world. It was significant because it brought together representatives and organisations from the communist world, and anti-colonial organisations and activists from the colonised world. Out of the 175 delegates, 107 were from 37 countries under colonial rule. The Congress aimed at creating a "mass anti-imperialist movement" at a world scale. The organisation was founded with the support of the Communist International (Comintern). Since 1924, the Comintern advocated support of colonial and semi-colonial countries and tried, with difficulties, to find convergences with the left wing of the Labour and Socialist International and with bourgeois anti-colonial nationalist parties from the colonised world. Another stimulus to create a cross-political cooperation was the revolutionary surge in China since 1923, in which the nationalist Kuomintang was in a united front with the Chinese Communist Party (CCP).

The League all but disappeared by early 1936, although changes in international politics, particularly Stalin's ascension to power and the shift from the prior "united front" policy to the "social-fascist" or "ultra left" policy, began to curtail the League's activity as early as 1929. After the Nazi seizure of power in 1933, the League's headquarters moved from Berlin to London. At the 7th Comintern Congress (25 July 1935), it was decided that the priority of the Soviet Communist Party and its affiliates was to unite with the Socialist International and bourgeois Parliamentarians to fight against the Global Fascist's threat to take over the world, which is what was then termed as the Popular front tactic.

According to Indian Marxist historian Vijay Prashad, the inclusion of the word "league" in the organisation's name was a direct attack on the League of Nations, which perpetuated colonialism through the mandate system.

At the 1955 Bandung Conference, Sukarno credited the League as the start of an eventually successful worldwide movement against colonialism. He recalled the League's 1927 congress as the moment when "so many distinguished Delegates who are present here today met each otehr and found new strength in their fight for independence."

== 1927 Brussels Conference ==
Willi Münzenberg, the German communist and chair of the Workers International Relief (IAH), initiated the establishment of the League Against Imperialism. Drawing from the IAH's networks of other anticolonial activities, such as the Hands Off China campaign, he invited many personalities from European and American Left and anti-colonial nationalists from the colonised world. Among those present in Brussels were emissaries of the Chinese Kuomintang party in Europe, Jawaharlal Nehru of the Indian National Congress, accompanied by Virendranath Chattopadhyaya, Josiah Tshangana Gumede of the African National Congress (ANC) of South Africa, Messali Hadj of the Algerian Étoile Nord-Africaine, and Mohammad Hatta of the Perhimpoenan Indonesia. Moreover, many activists from the European and American Left were present, such as Fenner Brockway, Arthur MacManus, Edo Fimmen, Reginald Bridgeman, and Gabrielle Duchêne, as well as intellectuals such as Henri Barbusse and Romain Rolland. Other prominent individuals, such as Gandhi and Albert Einstein, one of the League's honorary presidents, did not attend but sent their good wishes.

Approximately fifty speeches were given over the course of the first four days of the Brussels Congress, over nine sessions that met each morning and evening. Three main points were made in Brussels: the anti-imperialist struggle in China, interventions by the United States in Latin America and the "Negro revendications". The latter were presented at the tribune by the South African Gumede; the Antillean Max Clainville-Bloncourt of the Intercolonial Union; the Uruguayan Carlos Deambrosis Martins, representing Haiti; the Barbados-born American Richard B. Moore; and the Senegalese Lamine Senghor, president of the Committee for the Defense of the Negro Race, who denounced the crimes committed by the colonial administration in the Belgian Congo, concluding that:

Imperialist exploitation has as a result the gradual extinction of African races. Their culture is going to be lost. ... For us, the anti-imperialist struggle is identical as anti-capitalist struggle. (Note: French: L'exploitation impérialiste a pour résultat l'extinction graduelle des races africaines. Leur culture va se perdre. (...) Pour nous, la lutte contre l'impérialisme est identique à la lutte contre le capitalisme.)

Messali Hadj, leader of the Algerian Étoile Nord-Africaine, requested the independence of all of North Africa. A manifesto was addressed "to all colonial peoples, workers and peasants of the world" calling them to organise themselves to struggle "against imperialist ideology".

After the conference, Mohammad Hatta, who was also elected in the Executive Committee of the League, said: "Our foreign propaganda in Brussels is the most important example of what we have done in this field so far." In September 1927, he was arrested by the Dutch authorities for sedition.

The conference saw conflict between representatives from organisations in Mandatory Palestine, Arab nationalist Jamal al-Husayni, Labour Zionist organisation Poale Zion, and the Palestine Communist Party (PCP). Bolshevik revolutionary Georgy Safarov angrily claimed that Zionism was a "British Imperialist Avant-Garde", which, according to Israeli historian Jacob Hen-Tov, reflected the Comintern's opposition towards Zionist activities in Palestine. After long deliberations by the Executive Council, the League ejected the Poale Zion delegation, with the PCP and Arab nationalists from Palestine, Egypt and Syria forming an anti-Zionist bloc for the vote.

The Cuban novelist Alejo Carpentier makes a small reference to this Congress in his novel Reasons of State (1974), in Chapter 7, Part 20. By a dialogue, in a train car, between the Cuban communist Julio Antonio Mella, who attended the Congress, and The Student, a communist character in the novel.

== 1926–1931: difficulties ==
The League Against Imperialism was first ignored, then boycotted by the Socialist International. Jean Longuet, a member of the French Section of the Workers' International (SFIO), criticised it, calling it "vague Sovietic chitchat" ("vague parlotte soviétique"). On 12 April 1927, as the Kuomintang armies of Chiang Kai-shek approached Shanghai, their allies carried out a massacre of communists and workers. In December that year, the rightists crushed the Canton Commune. The First United Front between Chiang Kai-shek's Nationalists and the CCP was terminated, sparking the Chinese Civil War, just as the struggle against the Empire of Japan grew crucial, leading up to the Japanese invasion of Manchuria in 1931.

Moreover, the 6th World Congress of the Communist International, in 1928, changed policy directions, denouncing "social fascism" in what it called the "third period of the labour movement". The new "social-fascist" line weighed on the 2nd Congress of the League, gathered in Frankfurt end of July 1929. Eighty-four delegates of "oppressed countries" were present, and the Congress saw a bitter struggle between communists and "reformist-nationalist bourgeois". Divided, the League was basically inoperative until 1935, when the 7th World Congress of the Comintern decided to allow itself to dissolve. Nehru and Hatta had already been excluded, and Einstein, honorary president, had resigned because of "disagreements with the pro-Arab policy of the League in Palestine". In any cases, the League remained composed mainly of intellectuals, and did not succeed in finding popular support.

== 1932–1936: failure ==
The French section never had more than 400 members (in 1932). In 1933, the League published the first issue (out of 13) of the Oppressed People's Newspaper, calls in favour of Tunisia in 1934 and of Ethiopia during the Second Italo-Ethiopian War (1935–1937), which had few effects. The League was basically abandoned by the communists. In 1935, the League pooled its resources with the World Committee of Women Against War and Fascism (CMF; Comité mondial des femmes contre la guerre et le fascisme), (whose non-communist sponsors in Britain included Sylvia Pankhurst and Charlotte Despard), and the West-African Union of Negro Workers (UTN; Union des travailleurs nègres), to protest repression throughout the European colonial empires.

The League remained the first attempt at an international anti-imperialist organisation, a brief later assumed by the Non-Aligned Movement and the Organization of Solidarity with the People of Asia, Africa and Latin America headed by Moroccan leader Mehdi Ben Barka.

== See also ==
- World Committee Against War and Fascism
- All-America Anti-Imperialist League
