= Lamine Senghor =

Senegalese political activist (1889–1927)

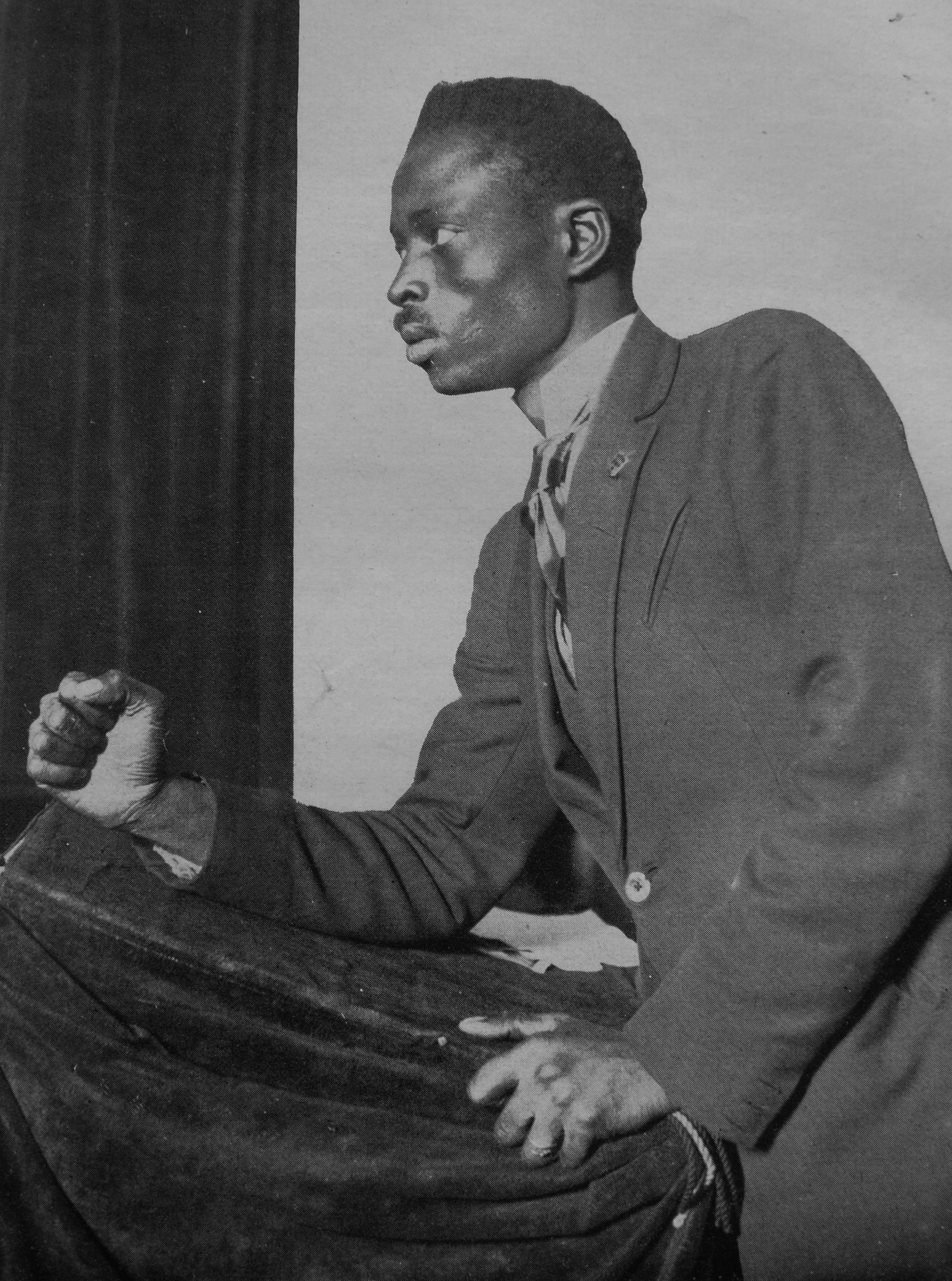
- Born: September 15, 1889; Joal, Senegal
- Died: November 25, 1927 (aged 38); Fréjus, France
- Occupation: Political activist

Lamine Senghor (born 15 September 1889 in Joal, Senegal and died 25 November 1927 in Fréjus, France) was a Senegalese political activist, Senegalese nationalist, and member of the French Communist Party. He ran as a candidate in the Paris local elections in 1924. Nonetheless he remained committed to an independent Senegal and became part of the internationalised struggle against colonialism and imperialism.

In 1926 he co-founded the Comité de défense de la race nègre, which after a split turned into the Ligue de Defense de la Race Nègre, a successful French anti-colonialist organisation which, after his death, spread to Germany.

In 1927, shortly before his death, he was invited to attend the Congress of Oppressed Nationalities in Brussels, where the League against Imperialism was established. The meeting was significant because it brought together representatives and organizations from the communist world and anti-colonial organizations and activists from the colonized world. In his speech he denounced the crimes committed by the colonial administration in Congo, concluding that:

"Imperialist exploitation has as a result the gradual extinction of African races. Their culture is going to be lost... For us, the anti-imperialist struggle is identical to anti-capitalist struggle."

== Works ==
- Lamine Senghor: La Violation d´un Pays, Paris 1927.
