= Guangzhou Uprising =

1927 communist revolt in southern China

- Part of Chinese Civil War
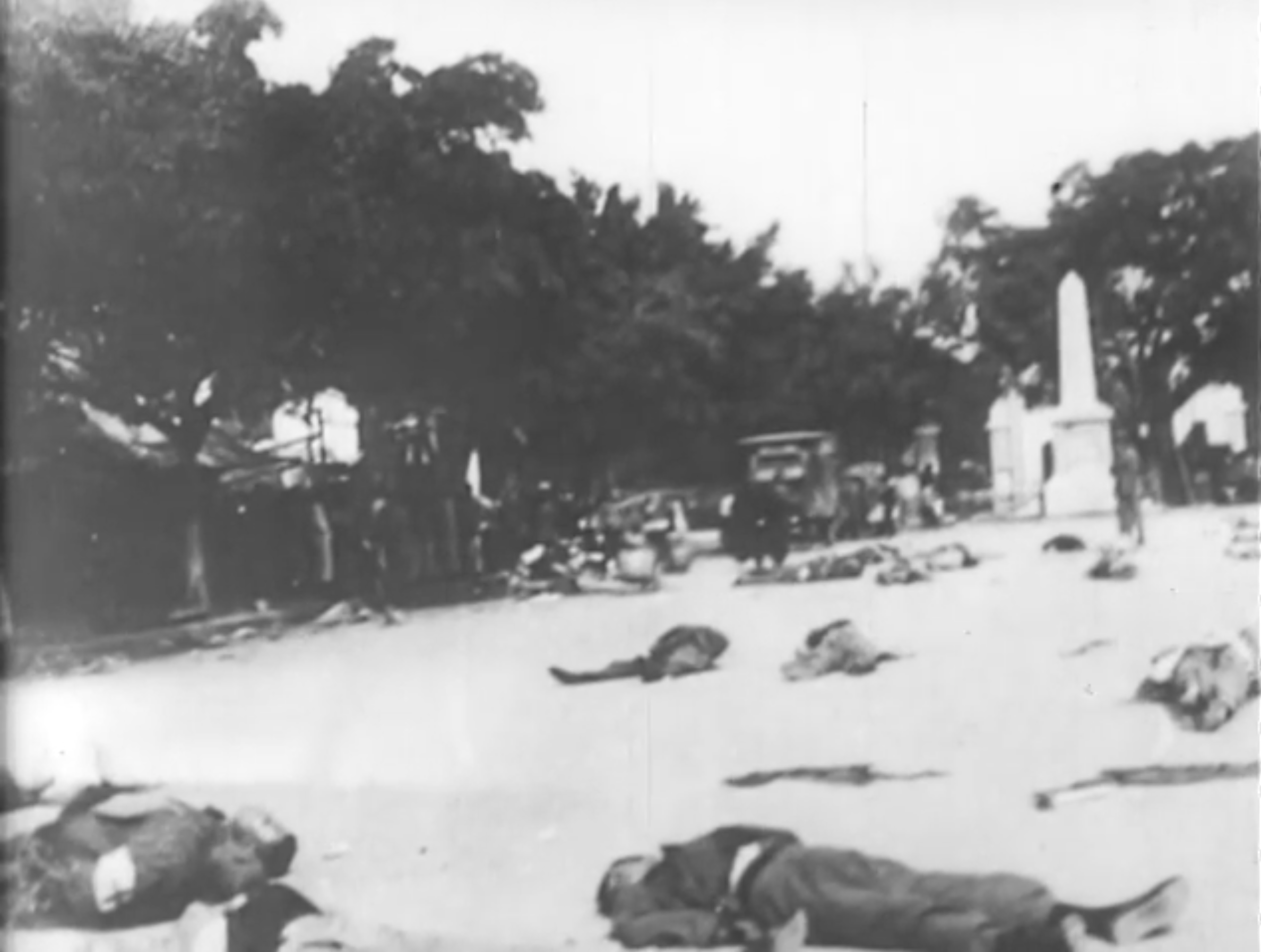
- Communist casualties
Date	11–13 December 1927
Location	Guangzhou, Republic of China
Result	Republic of China victory

Belligerents
Chinese Communist Party: "Soviet of Workers, Soldiers and Peasant Deputies"; Comintern	Republic of China

Commanders and leaders
Zhang Tailei †; Ye Ting; Ye Jianying; Xu Xiangqian; Heinz Neumann	(Republic of China (1912–1949)) Zhang Fakui

Units involved
Red Guard; Communist cadet regiment	National Revolutionary Army (NRA)

Strength
20,000 armed workers and soldiers	15,000 soldiers; later reinforced by 5 divisions

Casualties and losses
4000 killed	2800 killed
- 5700 Communists and civilians executed (executed)

Guangzhou Uprising
- Traditional Chinese: 廣州起義
- Simplified Chinese: 广州起义
- Cantonese Yale: Gwóngjàu Héiyih
Transcriptions
Standard Mandarin
- Hanyu Pinyin: Gǔangzhōu Qǐyì
Yue: Cantonese
- Yale Romanization: Gwóngjàu Héiyih

The Guangzhou Uprising, Canton Uprising, or Canton Riots of 1927 was a failed communist uprising in the city of Guangzhou (Canton) in southern China.

== Background ==
The Chinese Communist Party (CCP)'s Guangdong Provincial Committee had been preparing for an uprising in Guangzhou since September 1927. It originally planned to use a large group of communist-leaning soldiers who were heading into Guangdong after taking part in the failed Nanchang uprising. According to these plans, local workers and peasants were supposed to act as auxiliaries, while the soldiers would bear the brunt of the fighting. The troops from Nanchang were defeated at Shantou in early October, however, precluding any attempt to utilise them in the Guangzhou Uprising. CCP party head Qu Qiubai consequently decided that the communists had to persuade soldiers who were stationed in Guangdong to join their cause. Upon receiving orders from Joseph Stalin to launch the planned uprising in mid-December, over the course of November, a final plan for rebellion was worked out by the central party leadership and Guangdong secretary Zhang Tailei in Shanghai. Originally, the Chinese communist leadership opposed the plans, and made representations to the Soviet government to the effect that they had no chance at winning control of Guangzhou, but ultimately gave in to Soviet pressure. The CCP thought that fighting between the Kuomintang-aligned warlords Zhang Fakui and Li Jishen was imminent in Guangdong, potentially providing them with an opportunity to exploit the ensuing chaos by launching multiple simultaneous rebellions to seize power in the province.

Peasant insurgents were supposed to throw the countryside into chaos, while workers should take over the county seats, and a general strike would paralyze Guangzhou. A separate communist faction was to capture Hainan island, and an army from the Hailufeng Soviet attack Huizhou, and then advance against Guangzhou. In the end, however, the communists in Guangzhou did not follow this plan. The conflict between Zhang Fakui and Li Jishen already broke out on 27 November, with the former capturing Guangzhou from the latter in surprise attack. Thereafter, however, Zhang moved most of his troops out of the city to resist Li's counter-attacks. When the Guangdong Provincial Committee thus converged on 27 November, it concluded that the time was ideal for an insurrection in Guangzhou itself. It remains strongly disputed who exactly was responsible for the further course of events. The communists in Guangdong later claimed that their insurrection was based on the plans discussed with the party leadership, though historian Hsiao Tso-Liang argued that the former still acted completely autonomous and without the knowledge of the latter. Other historians consider this view too extreme, and have put forth evidence which suggests that the CCP's central leadership was informed about the ongoing events in Guangdong. Furthermore, it has been argued that Comintern agents who were present in the province might have decisively influenced the Guangdong Provincial Committee in its decisions about when and how to launch a rebellion.

Regardless of who was responsible for the decision, the Guangdong Committee began to prepare its uprising in earnest from 27 November. A Revolutionary Military Council was appointed with Ye Ting as commander-in-chief and Zhang Tailei as chairman. Sometime in early December, Comintern agent Heinz Neumann arrived in Guangdong, joining the local communists. According to CCP leader Zhang Guotao, Neumann came to wield great influence on the committee and took a leading role in the rebellion; others believe that he was just a messenger for Stalin. The core fighting force of the rebellion consisted of an ad-hoc "Red Guard" formed by 2,000 armed workers, and a communist-infiltrated cadet regiment of 1,200 soldiers.

== History ==
On 11 December 1927, the political leadership of the CCP ordered about 20,000 communist-leaning soldiers and armed workers to organize a "Red Guard" and take over Guangzhou. The uprising occurred despite the strong objections of communist military commanders such as Ye Ting, Ye Jianying and Xu Xiangqian, as the communists were badly armed - just 2,000 of the insurgents had rifles. Nevertheless, rebel forces captured most of the city within hours using the element of surprise, despite a huge numerical and technical advantage held by government troops. The communist leaders officially renamed the city's political structure the "Soviet of Workers, Soldiers and Peasant Deputies" or "Guangzhou Soviet". After this initial success for the communists, however, the 15,000 National Revolutionary Army (NRA) troops in the area moved into the city and started to push back the insurgents. After five more NRA divisions arrived in Guangzhou, the uprising was quickly crushed. The insurgents suffered heavy casualties, while the survivors had to flee the city or go into hiding. The Comintern, especially Neumann, were later blamed for insisting that the communists had to hold onto Guangzhou at all cost. Zhang Tailei, the leading Red Guard organizer, was killed in an ambush as he returned from a meeting. The takeover dissolved by the early morning of December 13, 1927.

In the resulting purges, many young communists were executed and the Guangzhou Soviet became known as the "Canton Commune", "Guangzhou Commune" or "Paris Commune of the East"; it lasted only a short time at the cost of more than 5,700 communists dead and an equal number missing. Around 8 p.m. on 13 December, the Soviet consulate in Guangzhou was surrounded and all its personnel were arrested. In the accident the consulate diplomats Ukolov, Ivanov and others were killed. Ye Ting, the military commander, was scapegoated, purged and blamed for the failure, despite the fact that the obvious disadvantages of the communist force was the main cause of the defeat, as Ye Ting and other military commanders had correctly pointed out. Enraged by his unjustified treatment, Ye Ting left China and went into exile in Europe, not returning until nearly a decade later.

In January 1928, the Kuomintang captured Communist Party members Zhou Wenyong and Chen Tiejun, who had taken part in preparations for the uprising and had returned to the city to attempt to rebuild the party's underground organs. They were executed on February 6, 1928.

Because it was the third failed uprising of 1927, the morale of the communists was reduced. In an article published in 1946 by Italian communist left journal Prometeo, it described the failure of the uprising as the "third counter-revolutionary medal" of the Comintern, arguing that it was "a mortal blow" to the Chinese masses' revolutionary aspirations, convinced that realizing soviet power had become impossible.

== See also ==
- Outline of the Chinese Civil War
- Shanghai Massacre, start of the Chinese Civil War

== Bibliography ==
- Wu, Bishan; Zhao, Tong (2021). "Analysis of Gardening Theory and Method of Small and Micro Space -- Taking the "Blood Sacrifice to Xuanyuan Pavilion" in Guangzhou Uprising Martyr Cemetery Park as an Example" (PDF). Academic Journal of Architecture and Geotechnical Engineering. 3 (1). ISSN 2663-1563.
- Brandt, Conrad (1958). Stalin's Failure in China: 1924–1927. Cambridge, Massachusetts: Harvard University Press.
- Dirlik, Arif (1 October 1997), "Narrativizing Revolution: The Guangzhou Uprising (11–13 December 1927) in Workers' Perspective", Modern China
- Hsiao, Tso-Liang (April–June 1967). "Chinese Communism and the Canton Soviet of 1927". The China Quarterly (30): 49–78. JSTOR 651862.
- Jowett, Philip S. (2013). China's Wars. Rousing the Dragon 1894–1949. Atglen, Pennsylvania: Schiffer Publishing. ISBN 978-1782004073.
- Jowett, Philip S. (2014). The Armies of Warlord China 1911–1928. Atglen, Pennsylvania: Schiffer Publishing. ISBN 978-0764343452.
- Tsin, Michael T. W. (2002). Nation, Governance, and Modernity in China: Canton, 1900–1927. Stanford, California: Stanford University Press.
