= Communist symbolism =

Symbols central to communist imagery

Communist symbolism represents a variety of themes, including revolution, the proletariat, the peasantry, agriculture, or international solidarity. The red flag, the hammer and sickle, and the red star – or variations thereof – are some of the symbols adopted by communist movements, governments, and parties worldwide.

A tradition of including communist symbolism in socialist-style emblems and flags began with the flag of the Soviet Union and has since been taken up by a long line of socialist states.

In Indonesia, Latvia, Lithuania, the Czech Republic and Ukraine, communist symbols are banned and displays in public for non-educational use are considered a criminal offense.

== Hammer and sickle ==

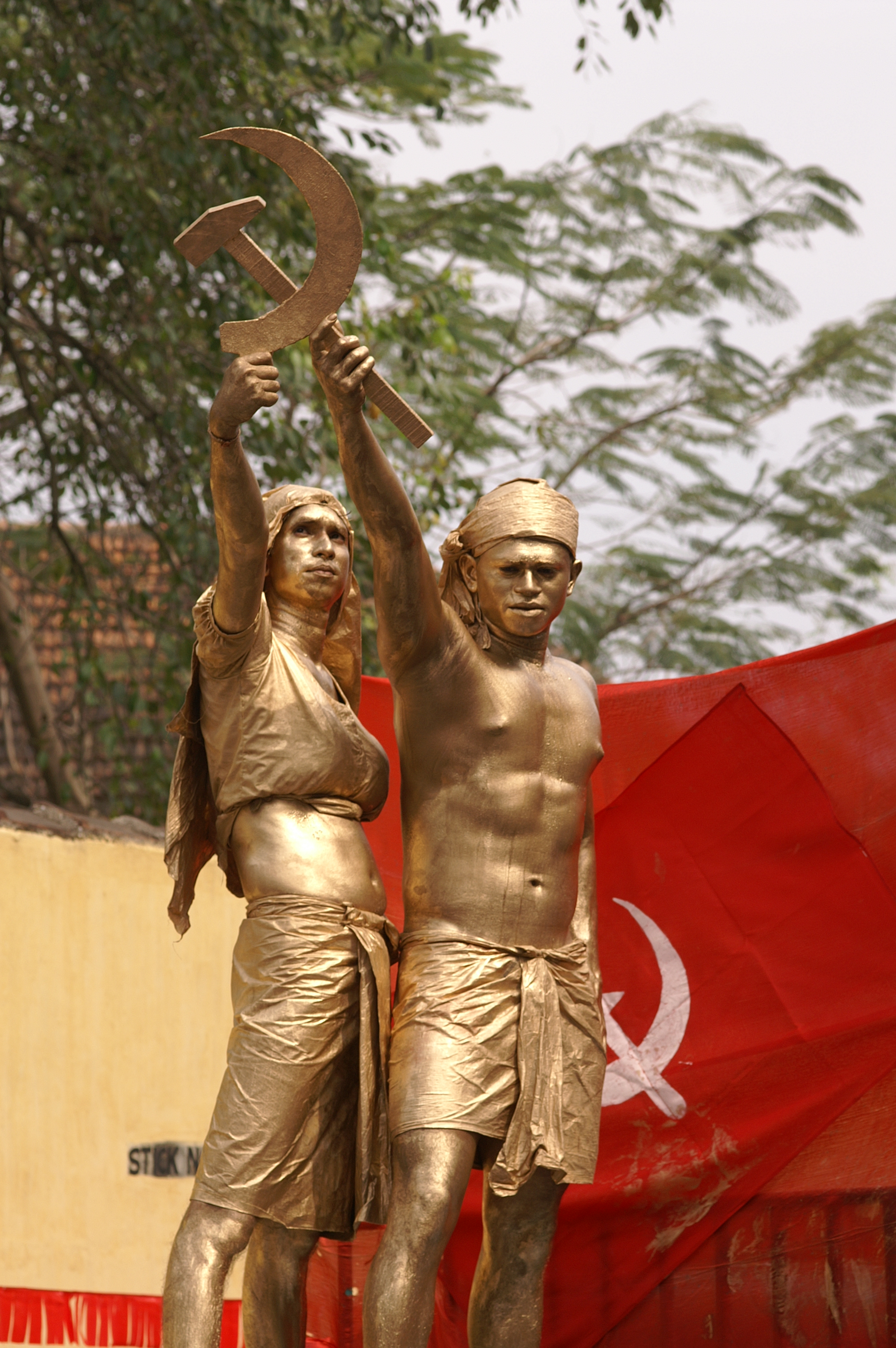
A tableau in a communist rally in Kerala, India showing two farmers forming the hammer and sickle, the most famous communist symbol

The hammer and sickle appears on the flags of most communist parties around the world. Some parties have a modified version of the hammer and sickle as their symbol, most notably the Workers' Party of Korea which includes a hammer representing industrial workers, a hoe representing agricultural workers, and a brush (traditional writing-implement) representing the intelligentsia.

The hammer stands for the industrial working class and the sickle represents the agricultural workers, therefore together they represent the unity of the two groups.

The hammer and sickle was first used during the 1917 Russian Revolution; however, it did not appear on the official flag of the Union of Soviet Socialist Republics until 1924. Since the Russian Revolution, the hammer and sickle has been used by various communist parties and communist states.

== Red star ==

The red five-pointed star is a symbol of the ultimate triumph of the ideas of communism on the five (inhabited, excluding Antarctica) continents of the globe. It first appeared as a military symbol in Tsarist Russia. It was then called the “Mars star,” reminiscent of Mars, the ancient Roman god of war. On January 1, 1827, the law was signed that put a five-pointed star on the epaulets of officers and generals. In 1854, the star began to be used on shoulder straps. Later, the five-pointed star with a two-headed eagle inside it was used to mark military trains and carriages. In Soviet Russia, the five-pointed star symbolized the protection of peacetime labor by the Red Army (again, like in Ancient Rome, where Mars was also the protector of the agricultural workers). In 1918, the drawing of the badge for the soldiers of the Red Army in the form of a red star with a golden image of a plough and a hammer in the center was approved. The star symbolized protection, while the plough and the hammer were read as a union of peasants and workers. By the 1920s, the red star began to be used as an official symbol of the state; and finally, in 1924, it became part of the Soviet flag and the official emblem of the Soviet Union.

In the succeeding years, the five-pointed red star came to be considered a symbol of communism as well as of broader socialism in general. It was widely used by anti-fascist resisting parties and underground socialist organizations in Europe leading up to and during World War II. Most states in the Eastern Bloc incorporated the red star into state symbols to signify their socialist nature.

== Red flag ==

The red flag is often seen in combination with other communist symbols and party names. The flag is used at various communist and socialist rallies like May Day. The flag, being a symbol of socialism itself, is also commonly associated with non-communist variants of socialism.

The red flag has had multiple meanings in history. It is associated with courage, sacrifice, blood and war in general, but it was first used as a flag of defiance. The red flag gained its modern association with communism in the 1871 French Revolution. After the October Revolution, the Soviet government adopted the red flag with a superimposed hammer and sickle as its national flag. Since the October Revolution, various socialist states and movements have used the red flag.

== Red-and-black flag ==

The red-and-black flag has been a symbol of general communist movements, though generally used by anarcho-communists. The flag was used as the symbol of the anarcho-syndicalists during the Spanish Civil War. The black represents anarchism and the red represents leftist and socialist ideals. Over time, the flag spilled into statist leftist movements, these movements include the Sandinistas and the 26th of July Movement, where the flags colors are not divided diagonally, but horizontally. As in the case of the Sandinistas, they adopted the flag due to the movement's anarchist roots.

== The Internationale ==
Orchestral arrangement

The Internationale is an anthem of the Communist movement. It is one of the most universally recognized songs in the world and has been translated into nearly every spoken language. Its original French refrain is C'est la lutte finale/Groupons-nous et demain/L'Internationale/Sera le genre humain (English: This is the final struggle/Let's group together and tomorrow/The International/Will be the human race). It is often sung with a raised fist salute.

The song has been used by communists all over the world since it was composed in the 19th century and adopted as the official anthem of the Second International. It later became the anthem of Soviet Russia in 1918 and of the Soviet Union in 1922. It was superseded as the Soviet Union anthem in 1944 with the adoption of the State Anthem of the Soviet Union, which placed more emphasis on patriotism. The song was also sung in defiance to Communist governments, such as in the German Democratic Republic in 1989 prior to reunification as well as in the People's Republic of China during the Tiananmen Square protests of the same year.

== Plough or Starry Plough ==

The original Starry Plough was designed by William H. Megahy, though the concept may have originated with George William Russell, for the Irish Citizen Army and showed silver stars on a green background. The flag depicts an asterism (an identified part) of the constellation Ursa Major, called The Plough (or "Starry Plough") in Ireland and Britain, the Big Dipper in North America, and various other names worldwide. Two of the Plough's seven stars point to Polaris, the North Star. James Connolly, co-founder of the Irish Citizen Army with Jack White and James Larkin, said the significance of the banner was that a free Ireland would control its own destiny from the plough to the stars. The sword as the plowshare is also a biblical reference in Isaiah 2:3–4. In the bible verse, God pushes his followers to turn their weapons into tools, turning the means for war into the means for peace. The marriage of Catholic tradition, the biblical reference being integral to the flag's design, with socialist concepts, like the working class and the oppressor forcing them to take up their plowshares as arms, leaves the Starry Plough flag with complexity and nuanced implications, which culminate in a very wide range of interpretations. During the 1930s the design changed to a blue banner which was designed by members of the Republican Congress, and was adopted as the emblem of the Irish Labour movement, including the Labour Party. Labour adopted the rose as its official emblem in 1991 but continued to use the Starry Plough for ceremonial occasions, and in 2021 the party reverted to using the Starry Plough as their primary symbol (this time with white stars on a red background).

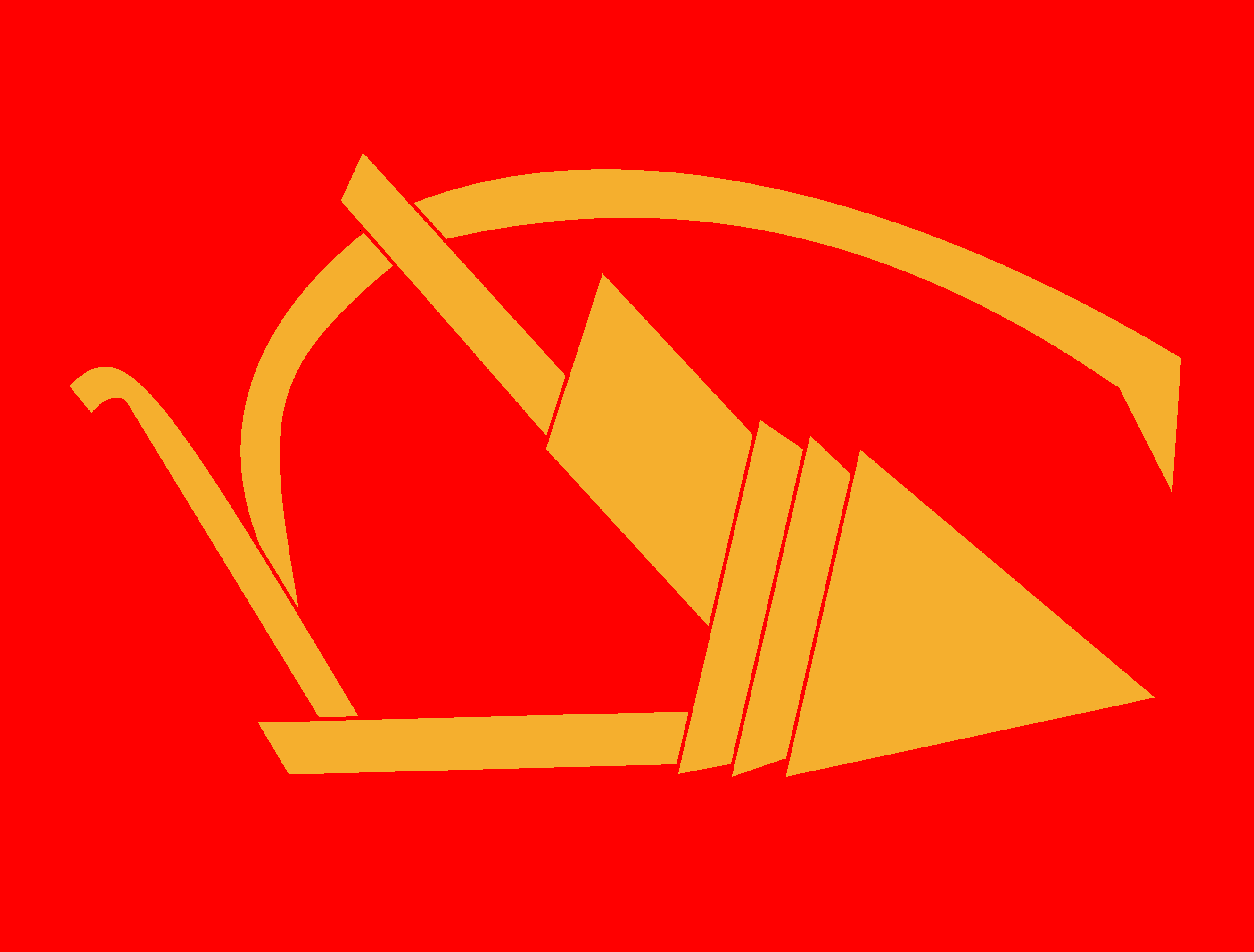

In China, the Plough flag (Chinese: 犁头旗), a red flag with white or yellow plough, was widely used in the period of the First Revolutionary Civil War as the flag of the Chinese Peasants' Association, an organization led by the Chinese Communist Party. It is believed that Peng Pai (Chinese: 彭湃) was the first user in 1923 at the peasants' association of Hailufeng. The Plough flag has many different versions and some are combined with the flag of Blue Sky, White Sun or Red Field; other are different on the details of the plough.

== National emblems ==
Soviet leaders sought to distinguish their insignia from the emblems used by the Russian emperor and aristocracy as they replaced and omitted the traditional heraldic devices, substituting an emblem that did not conform to traditional European practices

Many communist governments purposely diverged from the traditional forms of European heraldry in order to distance themselves from the monarchies that they usually replaced, with actual coats of arms being seen as symbols of the monarchs. Instead, they followed the pattern of the national emblems adopted in the late 1910s and early 1920s in Soviet Russia and the Soviet Union.

== Other communist symbols ==
Bans on communist symbols: All communist symbols are banned Certain communist symbols are banned Communist symbols were formerly banned

While not necessarily communist in nature, the following graphic elements are often incorporated into the flags, seals and propaganda of communist countries and movements.

- Socialist realism, an art style developed in the Soviet Union.
- Crossed proletarian implements, including picks, hoes, scythes and in the case of the Workers' Party of Korea a brush to represent the intelligentsia. The ubiquitous hammer and sickle also belongs in this category.
- Rising sun, exemplified on the state emblems of the Soviet Union, Turkmenistan, Croatia, Romania and PASOK.
- Cogwheels, exemplified on the emblems of Angola and China.
- Wreaths of wheat, cotton, corn or other crops, present on the emblems of almost every historical Communist-ruled state.
- Cherries resemblance from the Le Temps des cerises exemplified in the emblem of the Communist Party of Bohemia and Moravia.
- Rifle such as the AK-47 on the flag of Mozambique and Mosin–Nagant on Albanian lek.
- Red banners with yellow lettering, exemplified on the emblems of Vietnam and Soviet Union.
- Red or yellow stars, perhaps the most common communist symbol behind the hammer and sickle.
- Open books, exemplified on the state emblems of Mozambique and Angola; and also on the party emblems of Communist parties of Russia and Ukraine.
- Factories or industrial equipment, exemplified on the emblems of North Korea, Bosnia and Herzegovina, emblem of CPUSA and Azerbaijan.
- Natural landscapes, exemplified on the emblems of Armenia, Macedonia, Romania, and Karelo-Finland.
- Torches, exemplified on the Emblem of Yugoslavia.
- Sword and shield, exemplified on the Soviet Committee for State Security emblem and the Mother Motherland.
- Cross and sickle, the symbols of Christian communism and Christian socialism
- Portraits of various communist leaders, such as Vladimir Lenin, Joseph Stalin, Mao Zedong, Josip Broz Tito, etc.
  - Che Guevara's image, in particular as it appears in Guerrillero Heroico (“Heroic Guerilla”), is a common symbol of the Cuban Revolution, Guevarism, and revolution in general.
- Upright Fist in the air, sometimes a symbol of Anarchist Communism, Libertarian Communism, Libertarian Marxist ideologies, and Marxist Humanist Ideologies, less common among actually Marxist-Leninist Communist Parties.
- The Arm and hammer, exemplified in the logo of the Socialist Labor Party of America

Notable examples of communist states that use no overtly communist imagery on their flags, emblems or other graphic representations are Cuba and the former Polish People's Republic.

== Gallery ==
Examples of these symbols in use.

=== Hammer and sickle ===
Flag of the Soviet Union

Flag of the Chinese Workers' and Peasants' Red Army

Flag of the Workers' Party of Korea with a hammer, sickle and paintbrush.

Flag of the Turkish Revolutionary People's Liberation Party/Front

Flag of the Communist Party of Bangladesh

Flag of the Russian Soviet Federative Socialist Republic from 1954 to 1991

Flag of the Ukrainian Soviet Socialist Republic from 1950 to 1992

Flag of the Byelorussian Soviet Socialist Republic from 1951 to 1991

Flag of the Uzbek Soviet Socialist Republic from 1952 to 1991

Flag of the Kazakh Soviet Socialist Republic from 1953 to 1992

Flag of the Georgian Soviet Socialist Republic from 1951 to 1990

Flag of the Azerbaijan Soviet Socialist Republic from 1956 to 1991

Flag of the Lithuanian Soviet Socialist Republic from 1953 to 1988

Flag of the Moldavian Soviet Socialist Republic from 1952 to 1990

Flag of the Latvian Soviet Socialist Republic from 1953 to 1990

Flag of the Kirghiz Soviet Socialist Republic from 1952 to 1992

Flag of the Tajik Soviet Socialist Republic from 1953 to 1991

Flag of the Armenian Soviet Socialist Republic from 1952 to 1990

Flag of the Turkmen Soviet Socialist Republic from 1953 to 1992

Flag of the Estonian Soviet Socialist Republic from 1953 to 1990

Flag of the Karelo-Finnish Soviet Socialist Republic from 1953 to 1956

Emblem of the Soviet Army

Logo of the Communist International

Symbol of the Fourth International

First State Emblem of the Soviet Union (1923–1936)

State emblem of Lao People's Democratic Republic (1975–1991)

Logo of the Communist Party of the Soviet Union

Emblem of the Chinese Communist Party

Logo of the Communist Party of Vietnam

Logo of the Lao People's Revolutionary Party

Logo of the Nepal Communist Party

Flag of the Communist Party of Ireland, a red and yellow version of the Sunburst flag.

Flag of the Party of Communists of the Republic of Moldova, including a Book.

Logo of the Italian Communist Party

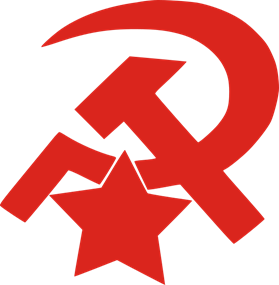
Flag of the Communist Party of Turkey (historical)

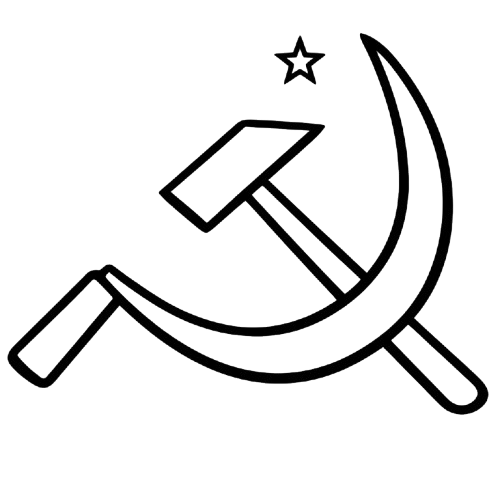
Election Symbol Of Communist Party of India (Marxist)

Election Symbol Of Communist Party of India with a sickle and wheat.

The National emblem of East Germany, a compass, hammer and circle of rye.

The Emblem of the Hungarian People's Republic from 1946 to 1949, a hammer and ear of wheat.

Logo of FRELIMO used from 1987 to 2004 with a hammer and hoe.

Coat of arms of the People's Republic of the Congo with a gold hammer, hoe, and star.

Flag of the Communist Party of Turkey (modern) with a gear and hammer.

Logo of the Communist Party USA with a hammer, sickle and gear.

The cross and sickle, symbol of Christian communism and Christian socialism.

=== Red flag ===
The flag of the Communist Party of Cuba.

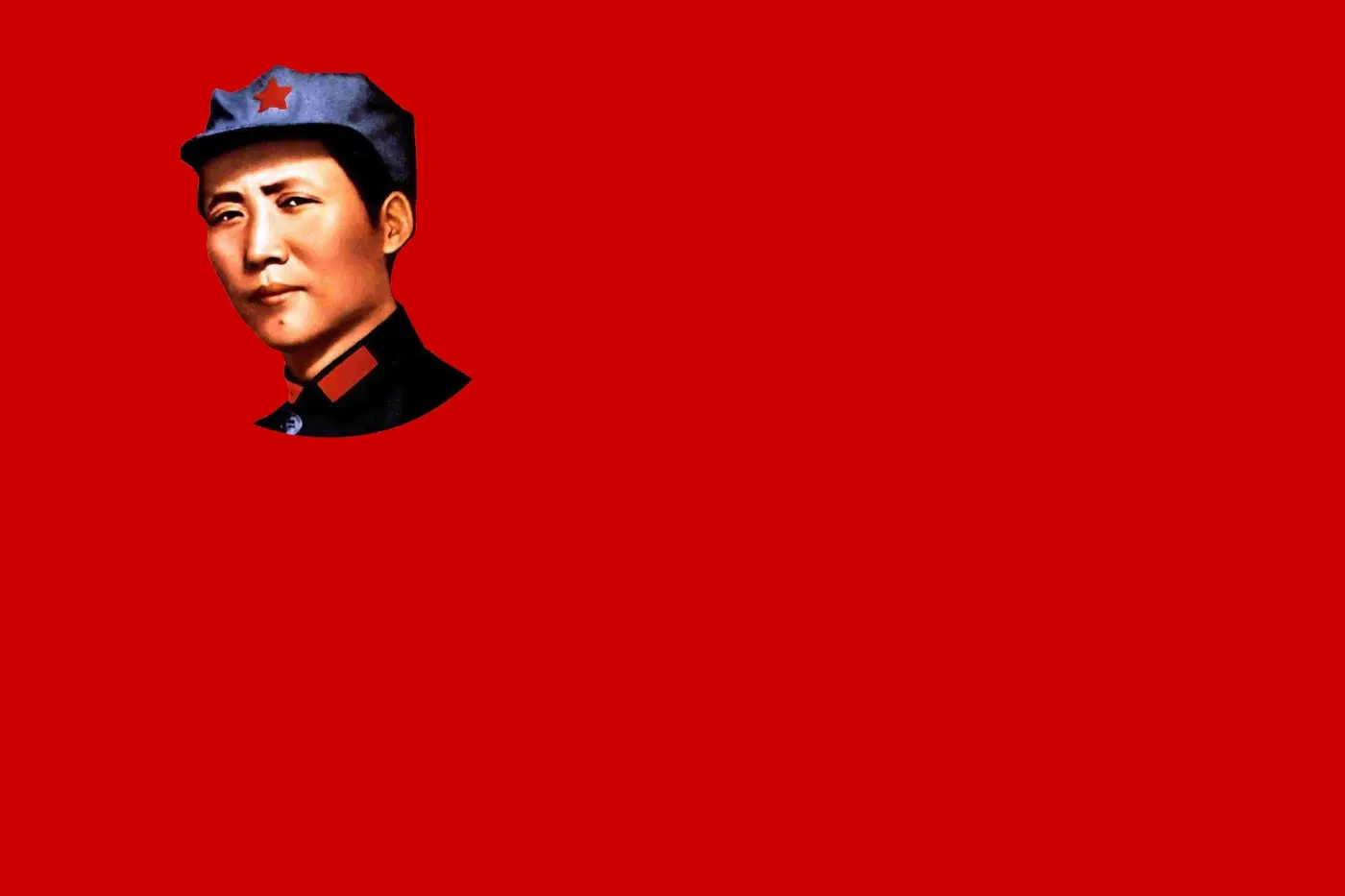
Flag of the Maoist Communist Party of China.

Flag of the Polish United Workers' Party.

=== Red star ===
Flag of People's Republic of Benin (1975–1990)

Flag of the Workers' Party of North Korea

Flag of the Workers' Party of South Korea

Flag of North Korea

Emblem of North Korea

Flag of the EZLN and the Neozapatista ideology

Flag of the Kurdistan Workers' Party

Catalan socialist independentist red estelada

Flag of the Popular Front

Flag of the Youth International Party

Flag of South Yemen (1967–1990)

Coat of Arms of South Yemen (1970–1990)

Emblem of SFR Yugoslavia (1945–1992)

Flag of Socialist Federal Republic of Yugoslavia (1945–1992)

Emblem of the Transcaucasian SFSR (1930–1936)

Flag of the Transcaucasian SFSR

Flag of the Hungarian Working People's Party.

Coat of arms of Hungarian People's Republic (1957–1990)

Soviet Order of Victory Award (1945)

Emblem of the Chinese People's Liberation Army

Logo of the Red Army Faction (West Germany)

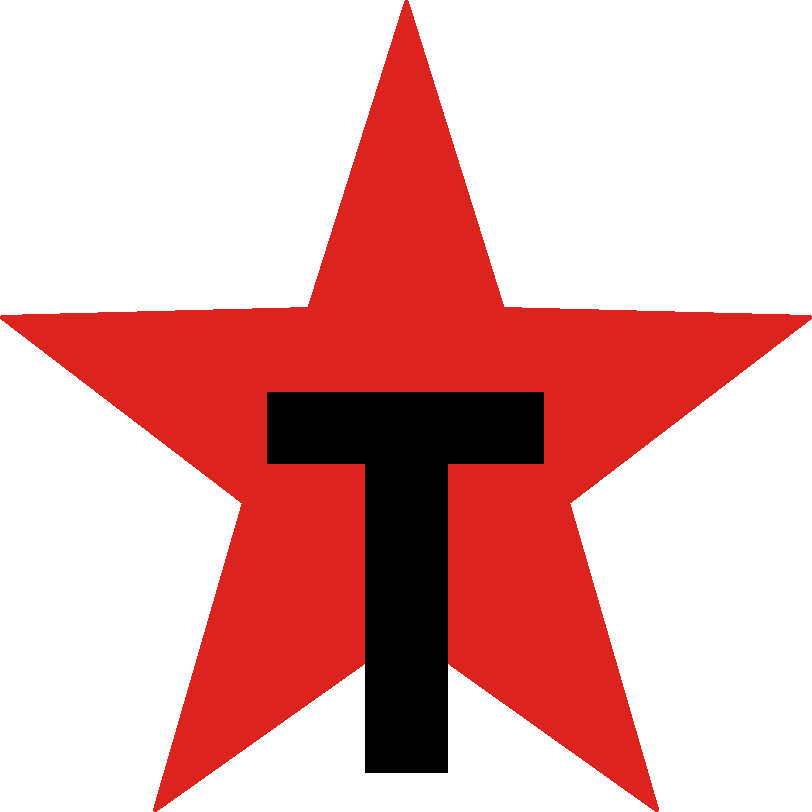
Logo of the Revolutionary Movement Tupamaro (Venezuela)

Logo of the United Socialist Party of Venezuela

Logo of the French Communist Party

Logo of the Red Party (Norway)

Flag of the American Party of Labor

=== Red and black flag ===
Flag of the Confederación Nacional del Trabajo (Spain)

Flag of the Sandinistas (Nicaragua)

Flag of the 26th of July Movement (Cuba)

Flag of the National Liberation Army (Colombia)

Flag of the Rebel Armed Forces (Guatemala)

Flag of the Revolutionary Movement 13th November (Guatemala)

Flag of the Partido por la Victoria del Pueblo (Uruguay)

Flag of the Revolutionary Left Movement (Chile)

Flag of MPLA

The flag of Angola

Flag of the Awami Tahreek (Pakistan)

Flag of the Revolutionary Movement Tupamaro (Venezuela)

Flag of the Intransigent Party (Argentina)

The logo for Antifa

=== Plough ===
The Starry Plough flag used by the Irish Citizen Army

A modern variant of the Starry Plough used by the Irish National Liberation Army

Flag of the Irish Republican Socialist Party and the Irish People's Liberation Organisation

2021 logo of the Labour Party (Ireland)

Flag of the Chinese Peasants' Association

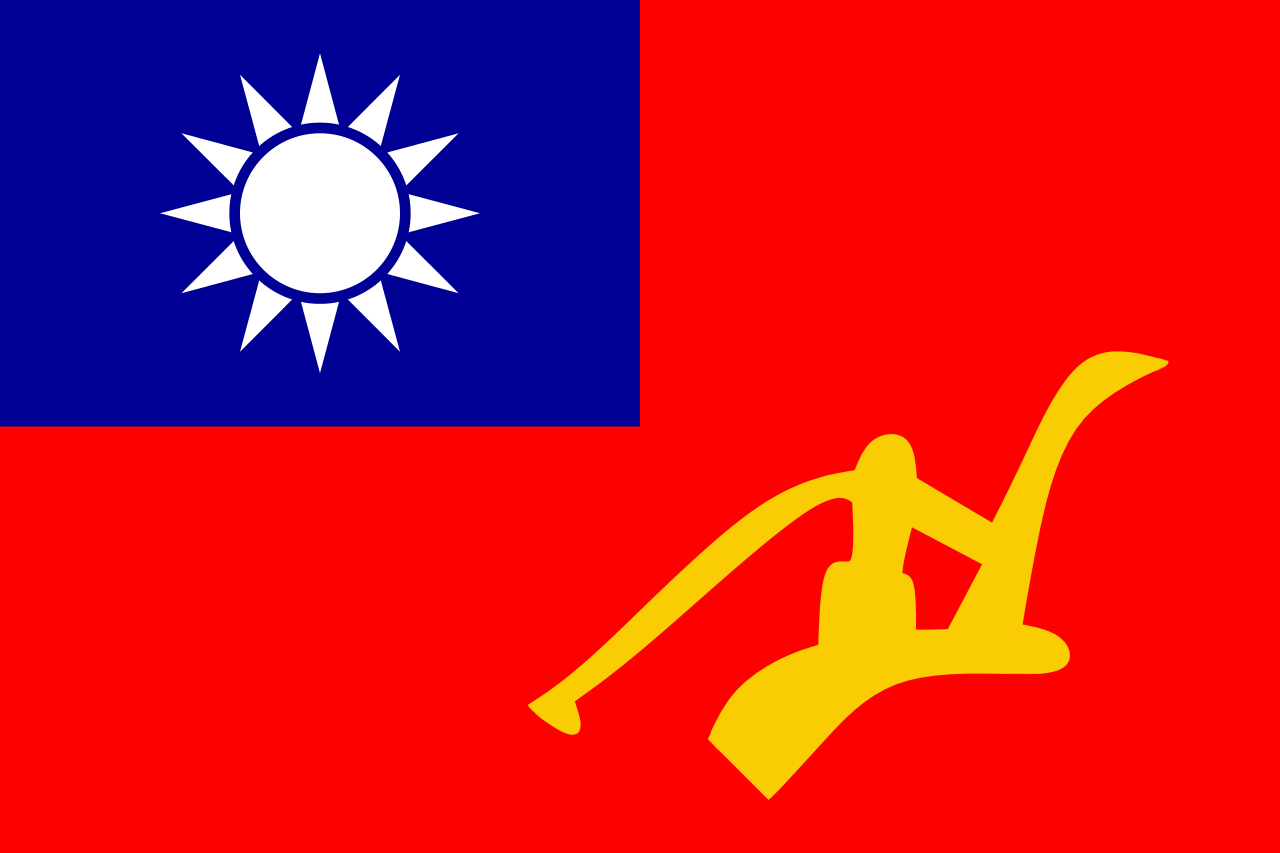
Flag of the Guangdong Peasants' Association during the period of the First United Front

Star, hammer and plough cockade of the Red Army (1918, soon replaced with a hammer and sickle cockade).

=== Other symbols ===
Cogwheel and machete emblem of MPLA.

The emblem of the Japanese Communist Party. It represents the two aspects of industry and agriculture, with the ear of rice and the cog in front of four red flags.

The flag of Vietnam, an example of a red flag with a gold star.

Flag of the People's Republic of China.

Logo of the Swiss Party of Labour, a Phrygian cap with a Swiss cross on it.

The National Emblem of Angola

Emblem of the People's Democratic Party of Afghanistan, with a gold ear of grain and a gear on a red background.

Emblem of the Socialist Labor Party of America, an arm and hammer.

Emblem of the American Labor Party, a cogwheel with two hands shaking.

Young Pioneers pin featuring a stylized portrait of Vladimir Lenin.

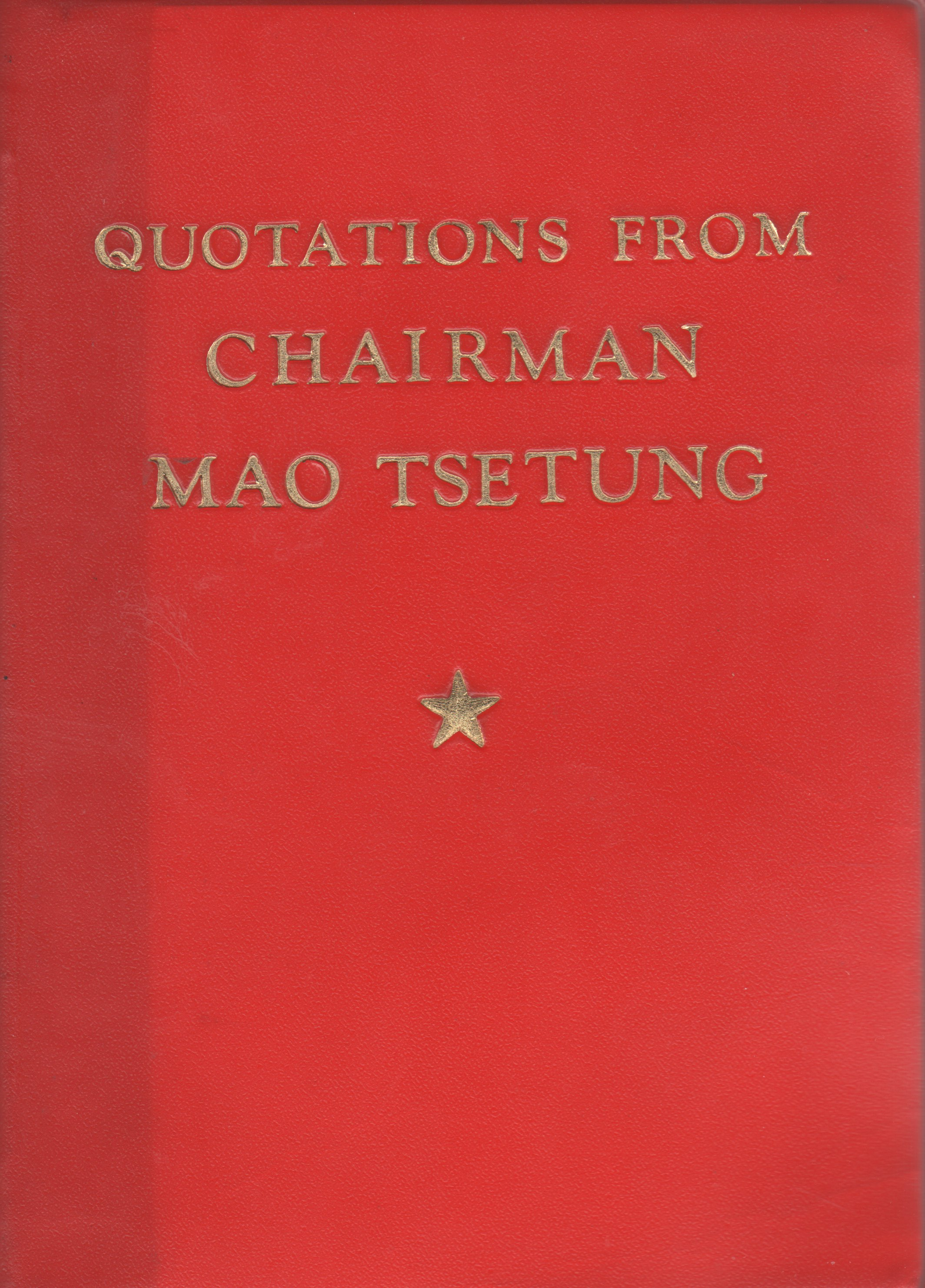
Quotations from Chairman Mao Tse-tung (aka the "Little Red Book"), associated with Maoism.

Flag featuring the "Three Heads" of Karl Marx, Friedrich Engels, and Vladimir Lenin.

The "Four Heads" of Marxism: Marx, Engels, Lenin, and Stalin.

The "Five Heads" of Marx, Engels, Lenin, Stalin, and Mao.

The "Six Heads" of Marx, Engels, Lenin, Stalin, Mao and Minh

Che Guevara's image, symbol of Guevarism.

A flag with the faces of Camilo Cienfuegos, Fidel Castro, and Che Guevara.

A flag with the faces of Kim Il Sung, Kim Jong Il and Kim Jong Un.

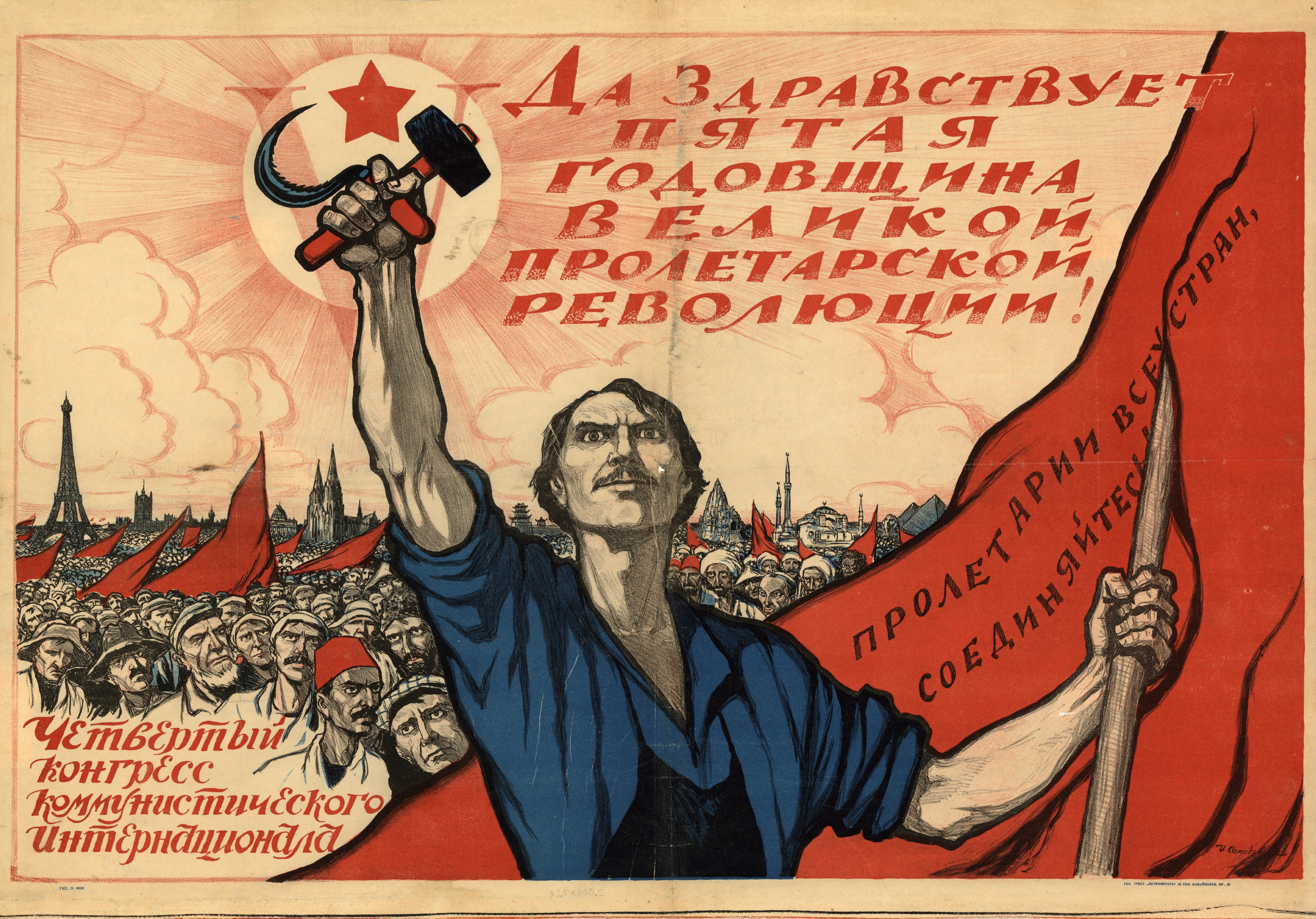
A revolutionary worker in socialist realist style.

Stylized raised fist, used both as a symbol in itself and as a salute.

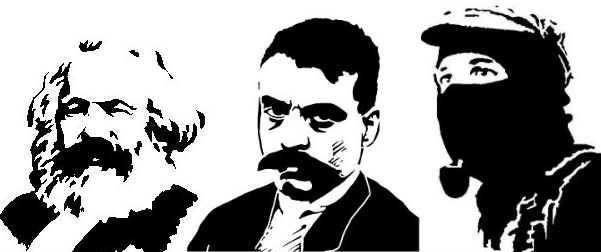
The portraits of Karl Marx, Emiliano Zapata, and Subcomandante Marcos, all symbols used in the Neozapatismo ideology.

== See also ==
- Anarchist symbolism
- Communist chic
- Fascist symbolism
- Fist and rose
- List of socialist songs
- Nazi symbolism
- Rose symbolism
- Workers of the world, unite!

National symbols

- Emblems of the Soviet Republics
- Flag of East Germany
- Flags of the Soviet Republics

== Bibliography ==
- Arvidsson, Stefan (2017). Style and mythology of socialism: socialist idealism, 1871–1914. Routledge.
- Barisone, Silvia, Czech, Hans-Jörg & Doll, Nikola (2007). Kunst und Propaganda im Streit der Nationen 1930 – 1945: eine Ausstellung des Deutschen Historischen Museums Berlin in Zusammenarbeit mit The Wolfsonian-Florida International University. Dresden: Sandstein.
- Groys, Boris (2011 [1992]). The total art of Stalinism: avant-garde, aesthetic dictatorship, and beyond. Verso Books.
- King, David (2009). Red star over Russia: a visual history of the Soviet Union from 1917 to the death of Stalin : posters, photographs and graphics from the David King collection. London: Tate.
