= Land Reform Movement =

Chinese campaign led by Mao Zedong (1946–1953)

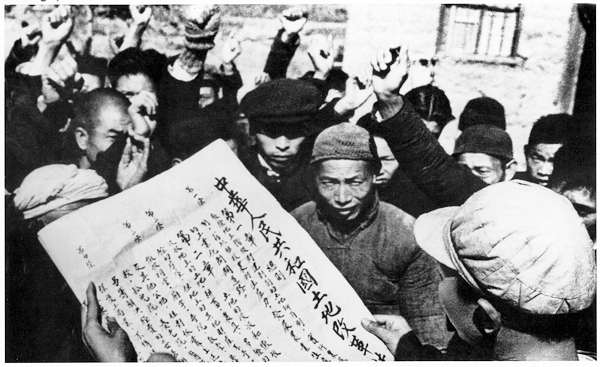
- The land reform staff publicizing the Land Reform Law to peasants in 1950
- Simplified Chinese: 土地改革运动
- Traditional Chinese: 土地改革運動
- Literal meaning: Land Reform Movement
Transcriptions
Standard Mandarin
- Hanyu Pinyin: Tǔdì gǎigé yùndòng
- Bopomofo: ㄊㄨˇ ㄉㄧˋ ㄍㄞˇ ㄍㄜˊ ㄩㄣˋ ㄉㄨㄥˋ
- Wade–Giles: Tu^{3} ti^{4} kai^{3} ko^{2} yun^{4} tong^{4}
- Yale Romanization: Tu^{3}di^{4} gai^{3}ge^{2} yun^{4}dung^{4}
Yue: Cantonese
- Yale Romanization: tóu deih gói gaak wahn duhng
- Jyutping: tou^{2} dei^{6} goi^{2} gaak^{3} wan^{6} dung^{6}

The Land Reform Movement, also known by the Chinese abbreviation Tǔgǎi (Chinese: 土改), was a mass movement led by the Chinese Communist Party (CCP) leader Mao Zedong during the late phase of the Chinese Civil War during and after the Second Sino-Japanese War and in the early People's Republic of China, which achieved land redistribution to the peasantry. Landlords – whose status was theoretically defined through the percentage of income derived from exploitation as opposed to labor – had their land confiscated and they were subjected to mass killing by the CCP and former tenants, with the estimated death toll ranging from hundreds of thousands to millions. The campaign resulted in hundreds of millions of peasants receiving a plot of land for the first time.

By 1953, land reform had been completed in mainland China with the exception of Xinjiang, Tibet, Qinghai, and Sichuan. From 1953 onwards, the CCP launched further "socialist transformation" and began to implement the collective ownership of expropriated land through the creation of Agricultural Production Cooperatives, transferring property rights of the seized land to the Chinese state. Farmers were compelled to join collective farms, which were grouped into people's communes with centrally controlled property rights.

== Background ==
=== Ideological basis ===
As early as 1927, Mao Zedong believed that the countryside would be the basis of revolution. Land reform was key for the CCP both to carry out its program of social equality and to extend its control to the countryside. Unlike in Russia before the revolution, peasants in imperial China were not in feudal bondage to large estates; they either owned their land or rented it. They marketed their crops for cash in village markets, but local elites used their connections with officialdom to dominate local society. When the central government began to lose control in the late 19th century and then disintegrated after 1911, the local gentry and clan organizations became even more powerful. In addition to breaking the political control of traditional rural elites and pursuing Communist views of justice through land redistribution to the peasantry, the Communist Party's motivations also included an expectation that land reform would liberate the productive forces by channeling peasant labor into greater agricultural production and put surpluses to better use than rural elites' wasteful consumption.

Mao's 1927 Report on an Investigation of the Peasant Movement in Hunan advocated a strategy of mobilizing poor peasants to carry out struggle (douzheng); a position which differed from the classical Marxist focus on the urban proletariat as the revolutionary class. Mao from that point on rejected the idea of peaceful land reform, arguing that peasants could not achieve true liberation unless they participated in the violent overthrow of the landlords. In Mao's view, peasant uprisings were organic events, and as a revolutionary party, the Communists should choose to lead them rather than stand in their way or to trail behind them and criticize. He concluded that "[w]ithout using the greatest force, the peasants cannot possibly overthrow the deep-rooted authority of the landlords, which has lasted for thousands of years."

In a speech at the Second National Congress in 1934, Mao addressed the significance of land reform in the context of the struggle against the civil war against the Nationalists:

If we only mobilize the people to carry on the war and do nothing else, can we succeed in defeating the enemy? Of course not. If we want to win, we must do a great deal more. We must lead the peasants' struggle for land and distribute the land to them [...] If we attend to these problems, solve them and satisfy the needs of the masses, we shall really become organizers of the well-being of the masses, and they will truly rally around us and give us their warm support.

Mao's analysis divided rural society into five classes: landlords, rich peasants, middle peasants, poor peasants, and farm laborers. This analysis was based on a person's relationship to the means of production. Landlords and rich peasants were defined as those who derived income from the exploitation of others' labor and had income exceeding their needs. Landlords owned land but did not work it themselves (instead either renting it to tenants or hiring laborers). Rich peasants rented out land or hired laborers but did also work the land themselves. Middle peasants were those who owned their own land, earned income from their own labor, and were neither in debt nor had significant surplus. Poor peasants were defined as those who owned some land but had to also work for landlords or rich peasants in order to survive. Laborers owned no land at all.

=== Prior Communist Party campaigns ===
In the 1920s, the Communist Party began experimenting with land reform. The CCP launched various rural campaigns as precursors to the land reform movement. These mass campaigns adjusted rent and interest to be more favorable to tenants, returned excessive deposits to renters, and overall served to weaken the traditional rural elites.

==== In Minxi ====
In 1928, Deng Zihui began land reform experiments in Minxi. Deng's efforts included a bottom-up method of policy development through consultation with locals and adopting their practical suggestions while reserving broader policy questions and expansion for Communist Party evaluation. Some scholars view Deng (as opposed to Mao) as the first to experiment with land reform through establishing model villages and disseminating model experiences.

By 1930, the experiments with land reform in Minxi had been widely disseminated in Communist Party publications and became an important point of reference for the Jiangxi Soviet's land policies from 1931 to 1934.

==== In the Chinese Soviet Republic ====
In the Chinese Soviet Republic (CSR), the CCP issued the 1931 Land Law of the Chinese Soviet Republic. It required:

All lands belonging feudal landlords, local bullies and evil gentry, warlords, bureaucrats, and other large private landlords, irrespective of whether they work the lands themselves or rent them out, shall be confiscated without compensation. The confiscated lands shall be redistributed to the poor and middle peasants through the [CSR]. The former owners of the confiscated lands shall not be entitled to receive any land allotments.

The property of rich peasants was also confiscated, although rich peasants were entitled to receive land of lesser quality if they farmed it themselves. By 1932, the CCP had equalized landholding and eliminated debt within the CSR.

Although the 1931 Land Law remained the official policy in the CSR's territory until the Nationalists' defeat of the CSR in 1934, the CCP was more radical in its class analysis after 1932, resulting in formerly middle peasants being viewed as rich peasants.

==== In the Shanxi-Chahar-Hebei Border Region ====
During the Second Sino-Japanese War, the CCP built a broader class coalition in the Shanxi-Chahar-Hebei Border Region. Its land policies were more moderate than during other periods, focusing on rent and interest rate deductions. Implementation of these reforms accelerated following 1943.

== Process of land reform ==
China's land reform was not only an economic or administrative process of taking and redistributing deeds or legal ownership of land. It was a party-led mass movement which turned peasants into active participants and which pushed for political and ideological change beyond the immediate economic question of land ownership. Land reform issues were also a matter of debate within the CCP, and leaders disagreed over such questions as the level of violence which was to be used; whether to woo or target middle peasants, who farmed most of the land; or to redistribute all of the land to poor peasants. The process of land reform varied based on the Communist officials implementing it in a given area and which other local groups needed to be accommodated.

Land reform progressed unevenly by region and in different time periods. In northern China, which had been governed by Communists since 1935, the peasants were more radical. CCP cadre in these regions often tried to restrain excessive violence from peasants. Land reform was undertaken more quickly and more violently in the north. In the south, land reform proceeded more slowly and less violently. There, land was owned by extended clans rather than individual landlords and poor peasants were sometimes part of the same kinship networks. In the south cadre sometimes had difficulty convincing poorer peasants that land should be expropriated at all.

Landlords were subjected to public struggle sessions organized by the CCP where they were accused of crimes against the peasants and sometimes sentenced to death, including being killed in public by peasants at these mass meetings. Struggle was confrontational by design, consistent with Mao's view that the masses had to actively take part in avenging past injustices. Speaking bitterness, defined as "articulating one's history of being oppressed and exploited by class enemies and thus stimulating others' class hatred, and in the meantime consolidating one's own class standpoint", was employed to focus peasant resentment towards landlords. While violence was not necessarily involved, Mao's position that the masses had to be given free rein in confronting their class enemies meant that peasant violence against those deemed landlords was common.

Rural women had a significant impact on the movement, with the Communist Party making specific efforts to mobilize them. Party activists observed that because peasant women were less tied to old power structures, that they more readily opposed those identified as class enemies. In 1947, Deng Yingchao emphasized at a land reform policy meeting that "women function as great mobilizers when they speak bitterness." The All-China Women's Federation called for Party activists to encourage peasant women to understand their "special bitterness" from a class perspective. Women activists helped peasant women prepare to speak in public, including by roleplaying as landlords to help such women practice. Because land reform resulted in allocations of land titles on the basis of adult household members, rather than on the basis of households (which typically had male heads of household), the economic independence of peasant women increased.

From 1950 to 1952, the land reform movement was extended to all Han agricultural areas and some of the ethnic minority areas which had intensive agricultural production or had land ownership practices similar that of Han areas. By 1952, land redistribution was generally completed. Most landlords had been permitted to retain plots of land after admitting to historical crimes, although many had been killed. The amount of cultivated land had grown, along with related infrastructure projects and availability of fertilizers and insecticides. By 1952, rural agriculture had become hugely more productive in China.

In certain minority group areas of China's Central Asian and Zomian territories, traditional landholding systems were left in place until the 1956 Democratic Reforms and in some instances even later.

=== Chinese civil war era campaigns (1946–1948) ===
Following Japan's surrender in the Second Sino-Japanese War, land reform campaigns focused on mobilizing peasants to take revenge on traitors who had collaborated with the Japanese. The Japanese occupiers and the Nationalist government had favored the interests of the landlords.

Throughout the land reform campaigns of the Civil War era, trends towards violent struggle against landlords coincided with increased combat in the war; when Nationalist forces or homecoming regiments were present, land reform and Civil War violence overlapped.

At the outbreak of the Civil War in 1946, Mao began to push for a return to radical policies to mobilize the village against the landlord class, but protected the rights of middle peasants and specified that rich peasants were not landlords.

On May 4, 1946, the Central Committee of the Chinese Communist Party issued its Instructions on Land Issues. The May 4th Instructions (also referred to as the May 4th Directive) required local party committees to support landlords who approved of land acquisition by the peasantry. As part of an effort to address some concerns of some landowners and those connected to them, the May 4th Instructions stated that landlords who "had earned merit for resisting Japan" would be left more land and that the land holdings of wealthier peasants would be mostly unchanged. It emphasized that while landlord land should be confiscated, land reform should address the holdings of rich peasants instead through rent and interest reductions. The May 4th Instructions also provided that dependents of soldiers and dependents of poor peasant cadres should be the first to receive land in order "to consolidate and strengthen the power of the people and the military." Poor peasants not fitting in either of these categories were the next group prioritized to receive land.

The May 4th Instructions provided significant leeway for differing regional and local interpretations. In villages where land reform was occurring for the first time, the East China Bureau allowed small and medium landlords to donate land; those who did were allowed to keep more than the average middle peasant. The Northeast Bureau took a similar approach, even allowing most peasants who had served the Japanese Manchukuo regime to apologize and retain their land. In the Shanxi-Chahar-Hebei Border Region, instructions for implementing the May 4th Directive stated that the intent was to achieve land to the tiller rather than equal redistribution. In contrast to these approaches, the Central China Bureau moved more steadily towards land equalization.

In April 1947, the Shanxi-Chahar-Hebei Border Region began a Land Reinvestigation Movement in which poor peasant mass organizations investigated and adjusted the results of land distribution during the Second Sino-Japanese War. During this Land Reinvestigation Movement, it was mandated that landlords could not be completely dispossessed of land unless they had collaborated with the Japanese invaders or defected to the Nationalists. It was also mandated that the interests of middle peasants could not be violated.

The July 7 Directive of 1946 set off eighteen months of fierce conflict in which all rich peasant and landlord property of all types was to be confiscated and redistributed to poor peasants. Party work teams (gongzuodui) were the primary instrument of land reform and went from village to village and divided the population into landlords, rich, middle, poor, and landless peasants. Because the work teams did not involve villagers in the process, rich and middle peasants quickly returned to power.

From July to September 1947, the Communist Party held a National Land Conference to formulate the Outline of the Chinese Land Law. Issued in October 1947, the Outline identified the goal of "[t]he abolition of feudal and semi-feudal exploitation of the land system and the implementation of the cultivator owning the field." The Outline Land Law codified confiscation of land from rich peasants. According to William H. Hinton, who observed later parts of the campaign, it "played as important a role as the Emancipation Proclamation in the American Civil War".

Late 1947 directives from the CCP called for more lenient treatment for allies among the rural elite in established base areas whom the party viewed as sufficiently enlightened. The CCP instructed work teams and cadres not to dampen the enthusiasm of the peasant masses, but also to convince activists to minimize beatings and to oppose spontaneous executions.

The CCP sent the work teams back to the villages to put poor and landless peasants in charge, mandating the elimination of land rent, which it compared to feudal exploitation, and the elimination of landlord status. In one village in southern Hebei, foreign observers recorded that four people were stoned to death, and Hinton reported that at least a dozen purported rich peasants or landlords were beaten to death in the village he called Longbow.

Land reform movement violence surged in early 1948, prompting some CCP leaders such as Xi Zhongxun and Ren Bishi to criticize the movement. Ren announced a policy shift in January 1948, guaranteeing that targets of the movement would nonetheless be allowed to keep a share of property. This policy change contributed to a shift away from economic struggle and to political struggle. Mao's January 18, 1948 directive, On Some Important Problems of the Party's Present Policy likewise marked a less-radical turn in land reform and a broadening of the CCP's coalition. The party instructed that fewer landlords should be targeted and work teams should not beat or torture their targets. According to the CCP Central Committee, "the fewer people we attack, the better." It also stated that while "not considering class at all is incorrect, we must absolutely avoid over-emphasis on class origin to the point that everything is reduced to class origin."

In June 1948, concluding that most peasants were satisfied with the land they had received and that some were even concerned about further mass land reform campaigns because of their radical turns in the past, the Communist Party ended land reform in the Shanxi-Chahar-Hebei Border Region and northern China generally (except an area of approximately ten million people). Mao directed that in areas where land reform had not yet been carried out, it should be done so immediately and done once only.

Land reform was a decisive factor in the result of the Chinese Civil War. At the time of the CCP victory, more than half of the population living in Communist areas had participated in land reform and over 25 million hectares of land had been redistributed, largely as a result of confiscations from landlords and rich peasants. Millions of peasants who obtained land through the movement joined the People's Liberation Army or assisted in its logistical networks. According to academic Brian DeMare, land redistribution was a critical factor in the CCP military success in the civil war because land reforms linked the interests of north and northeast Chinese peasants to the party's success. The success of land reform meant that at the founding of the PRC in 1949, China could credibly claim that for the first time since the late Qing period that it had succeeded in feeding one fifth of the world's population with only 7% of the world's cultivable land.

=== Early People's Republic of China campaigns (1949–1953) ===
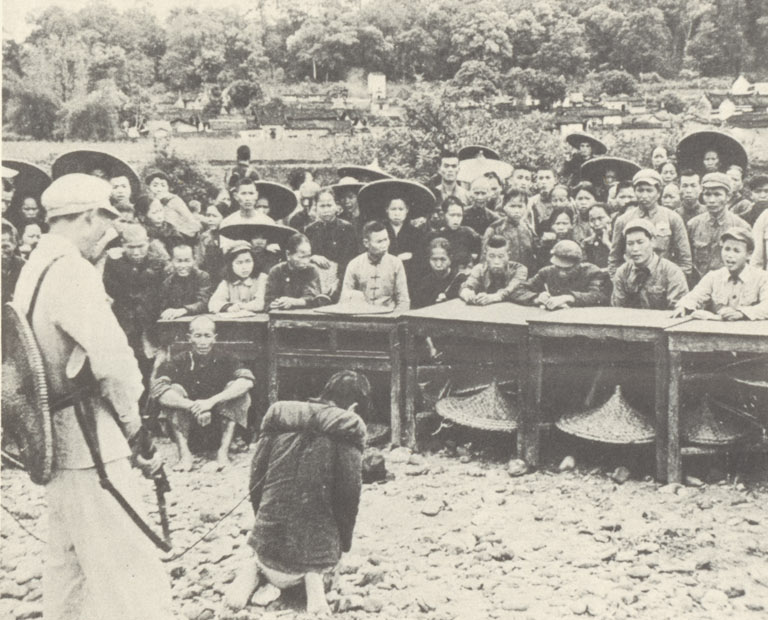
A wealthy farmer in front a Chinese Communist "people's court" in Fogang County, Guangdong Province on July 23, 1952

The Land Reform Movement continued during peacetime. Article 34 of the 1949 Common Program stated that "[e]very step of land reform should be integrated with the revival and development of agricultural production." The round of land reform carried out in the winter of 1949–1950 involved treatment of landlords that was considerably more lenient than in the Civil War era land reforms, with most landlords avoiding struggle. In the summer of 1950, the Land Reform Law made more lenient treatment of landlords the official policy. Landlords would be allowed to keep commercial enterprises and personal belongings other than the five big properties. These five big properties – land, draft animals, excess grain, agricultural tools, and surplus housing – were still subject to redistribution. The 1950 Land Reform Law was also explicit that the land of middle peasants should not be redistributed. It also stated that the rich peasant economy must be preserved and that law-abiding rich peasants must not be subjected to struggle sessions.

In this period, the CCP's view was that fewer targets were necessary to unite a broad base in opposition to a limited number of landlords. According to this view, a focused attack on the landlord class's core would also result in compliance from small and medium landlords. The CCP instructed work teams to refrain from indiscriminate struggle, which was now viewed as illegal. Under these directives, the East China Bureau tested a new struggle method in which the most exploitive or criminal landlords (deemed "evil tyrants") would be sent to trial but that work teams would meet with other landlords to explain land reform policy and their comparatively lenient treatment under it. The East China Bureau encountered no resistance from these latter landlords and the CCP deemed this test program in non-violent struggle a total success.

However, the Korean War prompted CCP leadership to be concerned that landlords might use the conflict to oppose the new rural order, increasing the view that violent struggle was necessary to defeat class enemies. Land reform in May 1951, according to Mao biographer Philip Short, "lurched violently to the left" with Mao Zedong laying down new guidelines for "not correcting excesses prematurely." Beatings, while not officially promoted by the CCP, were not prohibited either. While landlords had no protection, those who were branded rich peasants received moderate protection from violence and those who were on the lower end were fully protected. In this vein, Mao insisted that the people themselves, not the public security organs, should become involved in enacting the Land Reform Law and killing the landlords who had oppressed them, in contrast to the Soviet practice of dekulakization. Mao thought that peasants who killed landlords who had oppressed them would become permanently linked to the revolutionary process in a way that passive spectators could not be. Although violence came to be particularly frowned upon by the CCP in the final rounds of land reform, in practice the struggle by peasants against landlords continued to be often brutal.

In the early PRC era, there were millions of war widows. Widows whose husbands had fought in Communist armies received land through the land reform movement, as well as assistance farming it.

During the early PRC land reform, the folk artists and culture workers were a significant medium for promoting of the movement's ideological principles in rural China.

== Mass killings of landlords ==
Victims were targeted based on their social class rather than their ethnicity; the neologism classicide is used to describe the killings. Class-motivated mass murder continued almost throughout the 30 years of social and economic transformation in Maoist China, and by the end of the reforms, the landlord class had largely been eliminated from mainland China or it had fled to Taiwan.

Mao's 1927 "Report on an Investigation of the Peasant Movement in Hunan" addressed CCP members who were concerned with violence by the peasants against landlords, arguing that these concerns were a tool for continuing the oppression of the peasants. In this context, Mao coined his famous comment that "revolution is not a dinner party." Mao wrote in response to objections to violence:

It is fine. It is not "terrible" at all. It is anything but "terrible." ... "It's terrible!" is a theory for combatting the rise of the peasants in the interests of the landlords; it is a theory of the landlord class for preserving the old feudal order and obstructing the establishment of the new democratic order; it is a counterrevolutionary theory.

The CCP's tolerance of, encouragement of, or efforts to restrain, violence by peasants against landlords in the course of the land reform movement varied over time and location. Its directives were not always followed, and as late as the final rounds of land reform in the early 1950s, the future reformer Hu Yaobang had to explain that the call to "annihilate" the landlord class meant seizing landlord property rather than killing landlords themselves.

There were reports of policies that required the public execution of at least one landlord, and usually several, in virtually every village. An official reported 180,000-190,000 landlords were executed in the Guangxi province alone, in addition, a Catholic school teacher reported 2.5% of his village was executed. Some condemned as landlords were buried alive, dismembered, strangled, or shot. In many villages, landlords' women were "redistributed" as concubines or daughters for peasants or pressured into marrying their husband's persecutors.

=== Estimated number of deaths ===
Estimates for the number of deaths from 1949 to 1953 vary widely, with a total range of 200,000 to 5,000,000, which historian John King Fairbank called the upper end of "sober" estimates. It is difficult to separate killings due to land reform from killings due to the Campaign to Suppress Counterrevolutionaries (zhenfan), which occurred during the same years. As a result, most estimates below include deaths from both land reform and zhenfan:

- In 1978, historian Benedict Stavis estimated that 200,000 to 800,000 were killed during land reform, part of an estimated 400,000 to 800,000 killed during land reform and zhenfan.
- In 2006, historian J. A. G. Roberts wrote that estimates range from 200,000 to 2,000,000 for those killed during land reform.
- In 1954, Xu Zirong, the Deputy Public Security Minister, published a report concluding that, during zhenfan, "712,000 counter-revolutionaries were executed, 1,290,000 were imprisoned, and 1,200,000 were subject to control at various times", for a total of 2,620,000 arrested. In 2008, historian Yang Kuisong argued that "the actual number of executions was much larger than the reported 712,000" because local officials concealed executions after Mao mildly criticized excessive killing in 1951.
- In 1957, Mao gave an influential speech to senior CCP officials in which he stated that 700,000 had been killed from 1950 and 1952, and another 70,000 to 80,000 from 1953 to 1956, for a total of 770,000-780,000. Some historians, such as Daniel Chirot, claim that Mao Zedong estimated that 2,000,000 to 3,000,000 had been killed. However, Mao's full quote includes both deaths and repressions: "Two to three million counter-revolutionaries had been executed, imprisoned or placed under control in the past", because he was citing Xu's report.
- Some time before 1961, then-Premier Zhou Enlai told sympathetic journalist Edgar Snow that 830,000 "enemies of the people" had been "destroyed" before 1954, during land reform and zhenfan.
- In 1987, historians Twitchett, Fairbank, and MacFarquhar estimated that 1,000,000 to 2,000,000 were executed in the land reform movement.
- In 1999, historian Maurice Meisner estimated that 2,000,000 people were executed from in China from 1950 to 1952, including both land reform and zhenfan.
- In 1992, social scientist Steven W. Mosher estimated that several million died from land reform and zhenfan.
- In 2002, historian Lee Feigon wrote that "somewhere between 2,000,000 and 5,000,000 landlords had been killed".
- Deng Zihui, Vice Chairman of the Central South Military and Administrative Council, estimated that 15% of China's landlords had been sentenced to death, while another 25% had been "sent to labor reform camps for remolding through manual work" and 60% to "participation in production work under supervision". Not all of those sentenced to death were executed and therefore there is no way of knowing the exact number of performed executions.
- In 1952, the Free Trade Union Committee of the AFL-CIO, which was funded in whole or part by the CIA, released a report allegedly compiled by Wei Min of the Democratic Revolutionary League, which claimed that 14,000,000 to 15,000,000 were killed during land reform and zhenfan. The report cited no sources.

In addition, during this period, 1.5 million to 6 million people were sent to reform through labour (Laogai) camps, where many perished.

Philip Short argues that these estimates exclude hundreds of thousands driven to suicide during struggle sessions of the three-anti/five-anti campaigns, which also occurred around the same time.

=== Retaliation by landlords ===
During the Chinese Civil War, the Kuomintang established the Homecoming Legion (Chinese: 還鄉團; pinyin: Huán xiāng tuán; also translated as 'Return-to-the-Village Corps'), which was composed of landlords who sought the return of their redistributed land and property from peasants and CCP guerrillas, and the release of forcibly conscripted peasants and communist prisoners of war. These militia accompanied KMT forces advancing into the countryside even before the late 1946 formal outbreak of the civil war. On the pretext of pacifying the countryside, the Homecoming Legion killed civilians indiscriminately and routinely blackmailed, raped, and extorted civilians.

The Homecoming Legion conducted a guerrilla warfare campaign against CCP forces and purported collaborators up until the end of the civil war in 1949. Many landlords used violence to oppose land reform even after the defeat of the Kuomintang in 1949. Some landlords poisoned wells, destroyed agricultural tools, or cut down forests. The CCP widely disseminated stories of landlords' crimes as propaganda to build support for its view of the landlord class as an evil whole.

== Land redistribution ==
Land reform helped increase the Communist Party's support from the peasantry. From the perspective of many peasants, Communist administration had brought the tangible benefit of resulting in their obtaining land holdings.

Land seized from landlords was subsequently brought under collective ownership, resulting in the creation of agricultural production cooperatives. In the late 1950s, a second land reform during the Great Leap Forward compelled individual farmers to join collectives, which, in turn, were grouped into People's communes with centrally controlled property rights and an egalitarian principle of distribution. This policy was generally a failure in terms of production. The PRC reversed this policy in 1962 through the proclamation of the Sixty Articles. As a result, the ownership of the basic means of production was divided into three levels with collective land ownership vested in the production team.

Ownership of cultivable land before reform in mainland China (1950) (Note: The number of households, population, and total arable land are based on the 1950 agricultural production annual report. The figures for each class are calculated based on the proportion of each class before the land reform in each region.)
Classification	Number of households (10,000)	Proportion of households (%)	Population (10,000)	Population ratio (%)	Farmland (10,000 mu)	Proportion of cultivated land (%)	Average cultivated land (mu)	Per capita cultivated land (mu)
Poor peasants	6062	57.44	24123	52.37	21503	14.28	3.55	0.89
Middle peasants	3081	29.20	15260	33.13	46577	30.94	15.12	3.05
Rich peasants	325	3.08	2144	4.66	20566	13.66	63.24	9.59
Landlords	400	3.79	2188	4.75	57588	38.26	144.11	26.32
Other	686	6.49	2344	5.09	4300	2.86	6.27	1.83
Total	10554	100.00	46059	100.00	150534	100.00	14.26	3.27

Ownership of cultivable land after reform in mainland China (1954) (Note: The number of households was calculated based on the survey data of 9,900 households in 21 provinces and autonomous regions. Others are calculated based on the survey data of more than 15,000 rural households in 23 provinces and autonomous regions in 1954.)
Classification	Proportion of households (%)	Population ratio (%)	Proportion of cultivated land (%)	Per capita cultivated land (mu)	Large livestock (per 100 households)
Poor peasants	54.5	52.2	47.1	12.5	46.73
Middle peasants	39.3	39.9	44.3	19.0	90.93
Rich peasants	3.1	5.3	6.4	25.1	114.86
Landlords	2.4	2.6	2.2	12.2	23.19
Other	0.7	–	–	–	–
Total	100.00	100.00	100.00	15.3	64.01

=== Economic effects ===
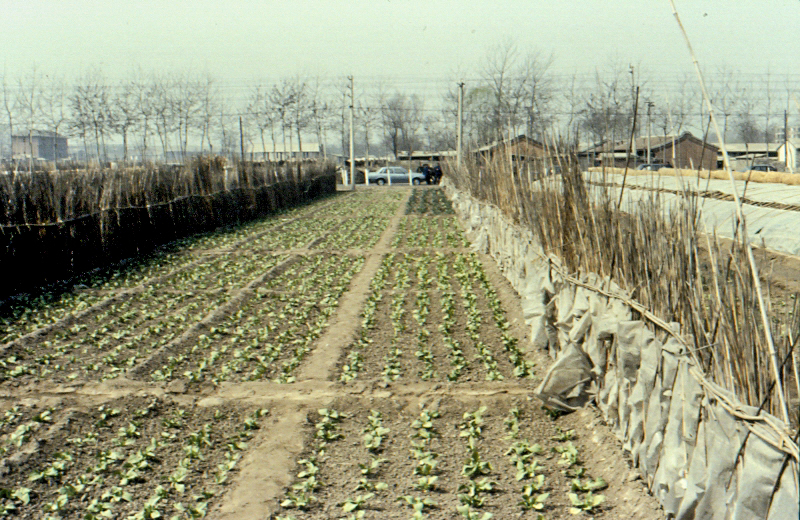
An example of a people's commune collective farm

Land reforms affected China in many ways, causing significant rifts and internal strife within rural communities. According to surveys conducted in 23 villages in Hebei and Chahar, the speed of transition from poor tenant farmers to middle farmers was rapid after land reform. However, the transition from middle farmers to wealthy middle farmers was slower, and the number of those who became wealthy farmers remains limited. In a survey of five villages in Shanxi, 34% of households that experienced a decline still had concerns and were hesitant to engage in active production due to the heavy burden of land reform. Additionally, 56% cited reasons such as illness, laziness, livestock deaths, and lack of labor, while 10% lacked the skills to manage their land. As a result, nearly half of the poor farmers who had risen in status later regressed, indicating that even after acquiring land, they still felt empty and lacked the means of production, making them vulnerable to any setbacks. The main issue remains the concerns of the masses and the lack of funds to expand reproduction. In the Northeast region, land reform did not lead to an expansion of productivity; instead, there was a shrinkage. Reasons for this included the large number of landlords and wealthy farmers, as well as the fragmented distribution of land leading to a lack of experience in organizing and managing farms.

Land reform not only altered the basic relationships in rural areas but also influenced subsequent political and economic developments, prompting China to face a new round of social restructuring and grassroots reorganization. The core of land reform lies in implementing equal land rights, whereby land and property are forcibly pooled and evenly distributed, aiming to optimize the integration of labor and land, thus enhancing economic efficiency. However, after equal land rights were implemented, although land circulation achieved optimal allocation of land and labor, there was soon a phenomenon of land concentration in the hands of expert farmers, leading to a change in the initial equal status. To ensure that this equal status is not altered, the only solution is to restrict land transactions and strip land ownership, thereby preventing land from concentrating in the hands of a few. Additionally, to promote improved economic efficiency, it is necessary to promote scale-oriented operations through mutual aid groups and people's commune, reducing the problem of individual farmers' limited risk-bearing capacity. However, despite farmers gaining land ownership after land reform, there was a free-rider phenomenon in collective labor, lacking incentive mechanisms, resulting in a lack of production enthusiasm among farmers.

As an economic reform program, the land reform succeeded in redistributing about 43% of China's cultivated land to approximately 60% of the rural population. Poor peasants increased their holdings, while middle peasants benefitted most because of their strong initial position. The movement expropriated land from over ten million landlords. Historian Walter Scheidel writes that the violence of the land reform campaign had a significant impact in reducing economic inequality. He gives as an example the 1940s campaigns in Zhangzhuangcun, a village called Long Bow in William Hinton's book Fanshen. Although poor and middle peasants had already owned 70% of the land:

In Zhangzhuangcun, in the more thoroughly reformed north of the country, most "landlords" and "rich peasants" had lost all their land and often their lives or had fled. All formerly landless workers had received land, which eliminated this category altogether. As a result, "middling peasants," who now accounted for 90 percent of the village population, owned 90.8 percent of the land, as close to perfect equality as one could possibly hope for.

Academic Brian DeMare states, "In the aftermath of land reform and the redistribution of village fields, many peasants indeed prospered. The turn from rural revolution to regular agricultural production generally resulted in increasing harvests and rising incomes. Besides the obvious benefit of the end of decades of warfare and chaos, the enthusiasm of new land owners drove production."

In the Second Kuomintang-Communist Civil War, especially during the Liaoshen, Huaihai, and Pingjin Campaigns, farmers actively supported the war effort by providing a large amount of resources. They supplied numerous stretchers, carts, livestock, and grain, offering solid support for the Chinese People's Liberation Army's operations. In addition to collecting grain and taxes, the Communist Party's grassroots rural governance demonstrated strong mobilization capabilities. During the War, farmers in some areas were mobilized to participate in wartime tasks such as dismantling railways and transporting wounded soldiers. Both laborers and militia actively engaged in tasks such as transporting grain, military supplies, rescuing wounded soldiers, and guarding prisoners, meeting the needs of the troops. During the three major campaigns, 8.57 million laborers performed various logistical tasks, while militia from farmer organizations participated in numerous battles, effectively striking at the enemy. These abundant human resources provided essential conditions for the rapid advancement and victory of the Liberation War.

Generally, agricultural production increased the most in areas and time periods when landlord wealth was redistributed but the rich peasant economy had been allowed to remain.

== See also ==
- History of agriculture in China
- Agriculture in Taiwan
- Land reform in Taiwan
- Criticism of communist states
- Dekulakization
- Great Leap Forward
- Great Chinese Famine
- History of the Chinese Communist Party
- History of the People's Republic of China
- Land reform by country
- List of campaigns of the Chinese Communist Party
- List of massacres in China
- Mass killings under communist regimes

== Bibliography ==
- Bradley, James (2015). The China mirage: the hidden history of American disaster in Asia (1st ed.). New York: Little, Brown and Company. ISBN 978-0-316-19667-3. OCLC 870199580.
- Chen, Fu; Davis, John (1998). "Land reform in rural China since the mid-1980s". Land Reform. Food and Agriculture Organization of the United Nations.
- Crook, Isabel; Crook, David (1979). Ten Mile Inn: Mass Movement in a Chinese Village. New York: Pantheon Books. ISBN 0-394-41178-1.
- DeMare, Brian James (2019). Land Wars: The Story of China's Agrarian Revolution. Palo Alto, CA: Stanford University Press. ISBN 978-1-5036-0952-5.
- Harrell, Stevan (2023). An Ecological History of Modern China. University of Washington Press. ISBN 9780295751719.
- Hammond, Ken (2023). China's Revolution and the Quest for a Socialist Future. 1804 Books. ISBN 9781736850084.
- Heilmann, Sebastian (2018). Red Swan: How Unorthodox Policy-Making Facilitated China's Rise. Hong Kong: Chinese University Press of Hong Kong. ISBN 978-962-996-827-4.
- Hinton, William (1966). Fanshen: A Documentary of Revolution in a Chinese Village. New York: Monthly Review Press.
- Huang, Yibing (2020). An ideological history of the Communist Party of China. Vol. I. Qian Zheng, Guoyou Wu, Xuemei Ding, Li Sun, Shelly Bryant. Montreal, Quebec: Royal Collins Publishing Group. ISBN 978-1-4878-0425-1. OCLC 1165409653.
- Karl, Rebecca E. (2010). Mao Zedong and China in the twentieth-century world : a concise history. Durham [NC]: Duke University Press. ISBN 978-0-8223-4780-4. OCLC 503828045.
- Li, Huaiyin (2011). Village China under Socialism and Reform : A Micro History, 1948–2008. Stanford, Calif.: Stanford University Press. ISBN 978-0-8047-7657-8.
- Margolin, Jean-Louis (2008). "Mao's China: The Worst Non-Genocidal Regime?". In Stone, Dan (ed.). The Historiography of Genocide. Springer. ISBN 978-0-230-29778-4.
- Moise, Edwin E. (1983). Land Reform in China and North Vietnam : Consolidating the Revolution at the Village Level. Chapel Hill: University of North Carolina Press. ISBN 9780807874455.
- Mühlhahn, Klaus (2019). Making China Modern: From the Great Qing to Xi Jinping. Cambridge, Massachusetts: Harvard University Press. ISBN 978-0-674-73735-8.
- Opper, Marc (2020). People's Wars in China, Malaya, and Vietnam. Ann Arbor: University of Michigan Press. doi:10.3998/mpub.11413902. hdl:20.500.12657/23824. ISBN 978-0-472-90125-8. JSTOR 10.3998/mpub.11413902. S2CID 211359950.
- Short, Philip (2001). Mao: A Life. Owl Books. ISBN 0-8050-6638-1.
- Shue, Vivienne (1980). Peasant China in Transition: The Dynamics of Development toward Socialism, 1949-1956. Berkeley, CA: University of California Press. ISBN 978-0-520-03734-2.
- Tanner, Harold Miles (2015). Where Chiang Kai-Shek Lost China: The Liao-Shen Campaign, 1948. Bloomington: Indiana University Press. ISBN 9780253016928.
- Wilcox, Emily (2022). "Dance Props". In Altehenger, Jennifer; Ho, Denise Y. (eds.). Material Contradictions in Mao's China. Seattle: University of Washington Press. ISBN 978-0-295-75085-9.
