= Plough flag =

Flag of the Chinese Peasants' Association

Plough flag

The Plough flag (simplified Chinese: 犁头旗; traditional Chinese: 犁頭旗; pinyin: lítóu qí) is a red banner with a white or yellow plough positioned in the center of it, widely used in the period of the Northern Expedition as the flag of the Chinese Peasants' Association.

== Symbolism ==
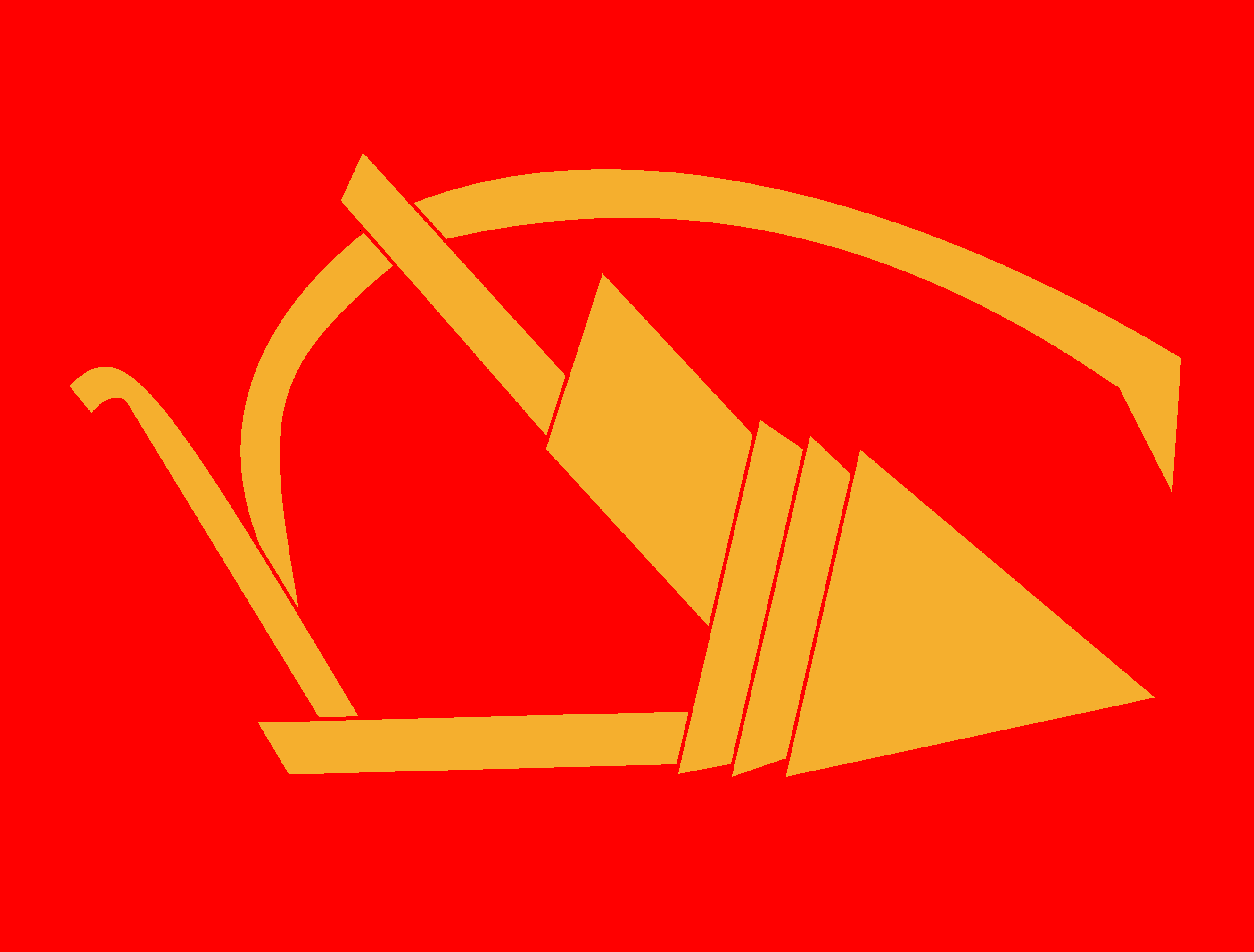
Another version of the flag.

The plough symbolizes the peasants' leadership in rural areas, and the red color stands for the victory of the communist revolution. When it is depicted in works of art, it is generally shown in conjunction with Mao Zedong and/or armed peasants. An example of this can be found in an illustrated pamphlet titled "'This is fine' – In memory of the 44th anniversary of the publication of 'Report on an Investigation of the Peasant Movement in Hunan"', published by the People's Press of Guangdong, where the illustrator uses the plough flag as a symbol of the peasant movement.

== History ==
It is believed that Peng Pai (Chinese: 彭湃) was the first to use this flag in 1923, as the Chairman of the Peasants' Association of Hailufeng. During the period of First United Front, when the peasant movement in China was at its peak, the plough appeared in the flag and membership cards of the local peasant associations in several provinces. Another version of the flag, used by the left wing of the Kuomintang, combines the plough with the Flag of the Republic of China.

After July 15, 1927, when the Chinese Communist Party (CCP) was made illegal in Wuhan, the associations controlled by the CCP stopped using the "Kuomintang" version of the flag and instead began using a version with a completely red background.

After the establishment of the People's Republic of China, plough flags have been placed in several museums around the country (e.g. the museum of Guangxi) as well as being featured in paintings as the symbol of the peasant movement during the Encirclement campaigns. A Caicha Opera (Chinese: 采茶戏) titled "Ode to the Plough Flag" (Chinese: 犁旗颂) was composed in Yangxin, Hubei.

== Gallery ==
Flag of the Chinese Peasants' Association.

Plough Flag used by the left wing of the Kuomintang.

== See also ==
- Starry Plough (flag)
- Communist symbolism
- Peng Pai
- Chinese Peasants‘ Association
- Chinese Red Army
