= Chinese Peasants' Association =

Communist Party organization (1927–1964)

- 中华全国农民协会
- Plough flag
- Abbreviation: 农会, 农协, 贫协
- Formation: 9 April 1927
- Dissolved: 1964
- Type: Peasants' Association
- Headquarters: Wuhan, China
- Secretary-General: Peng Pai
- Main organ: National Peasants' Congress and Executive Committee
- Affiliations: Peasant International

The Chinese National Peasants' Association (Chinese: 中华全国农民协会; pinyin: Zhōnghuá quánguó nóngmín xiéhuì), otherwise known as the Chinese Peasants' Association (Chinese: 中国农民协会; pinyin: Zhōngguó nóngmín xiéhuì), was a peasant organization created in 1927 with the specific aim of transforming the peasantry via socialism. It was led by the Chinese Communist Party until its dissolution in 1964. Its successor was the Chinese National Poor and Lower-Middle Peasants' Association (中华全国贫下中农协会; Zhōnghuá quánguó pín xiàzhōngnóng xiéhuì), created in 1964 and dissolved de facto in 1986.

== History ==
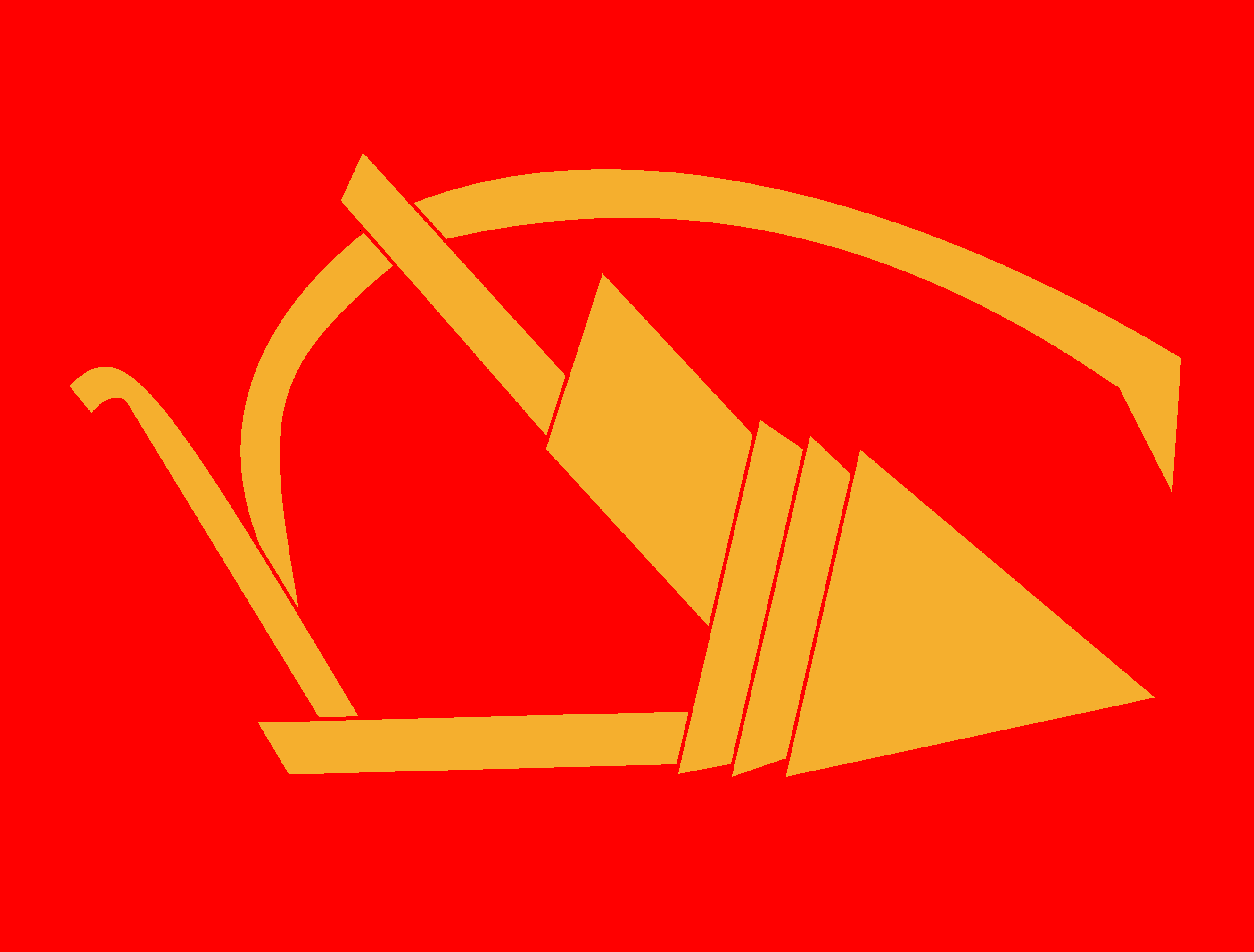
Another version of the flag.

Flag of Guangdong Peasants' Association during the period of the First United Front

It is believed that Peng Pai (彭湃) organized the first peasants' association in 1921 and then the first general association in 1923, within the short-lived Hailufeng Soviet. He designed the seal and flag of organization. The plough—a traditional symbol of the peasantry—appeared in both the flag and member cards made by the local peasant associations.

Before the Shanghai massacre of 1927, the Chinese peasant movement was at its peak. In Guangxi, Jiangxi, Guangdong, Hunan, Hubei and a few other provinces, many peasant associations organized by the Chinese Communist Party and left-wing Kuomintang under the direction of the Krestintern and Comintern.

In April 1927 the 1st Provisional Executive Committee of the Chinese National Federation of Peasants' Associations was formed in order to prevent the Chinese peasant movement from failure. The members tried to organize the first National Peasants' Congress and help local associations from being dissolved by the armed forces of "local tyrants & evil gentry" and right-wing warlords. However, due to the inapposite direction from the CCP central committee and Comintern, they failed and the provisional committee itself was no longer existing de facto after 1927.

Mao Zedong may be the most famous leader of the peasant movement. He organized the association of Hunan in 1926, which nearly half the peasants in the province (roughly 10 million) joined. After he investigated the associations again in 1927, he wrote Report on an Investigation of the Peasant Movement in Hunan to prove that his way of organizing peasants was right and to provide a rebuttal to Chen Duxiu's ideas of peasant organization and about giving up mass work. The phrase, "Down with the local tyrants and evil gentry! All power to the peasants' association!" (打倒土豪劣绅，一切权利归农会!) was representative of Mao's way of peasant organizing.

During the first stage of the Chinese Civil War (1927–1937), Mao Zedong made use of the associations in Hunan to further the communist cause, and lead the peasants into battle in the Autumn Harvest Uprising of September 1927. The Secretary-General of the peasants' association of Jiangxi province, Shu Guofan, successor to Fang Zhimin, was involved in the Nanchang Uprising around the same time. In the Chinese Soviet Republic, the association helped organize the peasants in the agrarian revolution.

After the establishment of the People's Republic of China, the peasants' association and then the Poor and Lower-Middle Peasants' Associations served mainly to aid the new communist government with the land reform, and then the introduction of People's communes as a provisional organ of power.

On 24 July 1986, the last provincial-level Peasants' Association in Hubei was dissolved.

== Organization ==
In all villages branch and local committee were organized. And from counties to provinces there're the general association(Chinese: 总农会) .

The supreme leading bodies were the National Peasants' Congress and the Committee of the All-China Federation of Peasants' Associations, elected by the congress. The committee elected the standing committee consisting of a chairman, vice chairmen and committee members, in charge of daily functions.

The leading bodies of different levels were local peasants' congresses and their committees of association elected by the congresses. Committees of county level or above elected their standing committees consisting of chairmen, vice chairmen and committee members. Committees of county level or above nominated working committees as their representative organ in township levels.

The primary organization is the primary peasants' congress and the committee of association, or simply a group. The congress elected a chairman, 1–2 vice chairmen and several members for a committee, or a leader and 1–2 deputy leaders for a group.

However, after 1964 the formal central organ may no longer be built.

== Leaders ==
=== 1st Provisional Executive Committee of All—China Federation of Peasants' Associations ===
Formed in Wuhan, 9 April 1927, it was also called "Provisional AFPA"(全国临时农协) or "Provisional Executive Committee"(临时执委) in short.

Members of standing committee:

- Tan Yankai (谭延闿)
- Tan Pingshan (谭平山)
- Deng Yanda (邓演达)
- Mao Zedong (毛泽东)
- Lu Chen (陆沉)

Secretary-general:

- Peng Pai (彭湃)

Minister of Organization:

- Deng Yanda (邓演达)

Minister of Propaganda:

- Mao Zedong (毛泽东)

Members:

- Peng Pai (彭湃)
- Yi Lirong (易礼容)
- Fang Zhimin (方志敏)
- Lu Chen (陆沉)
- Xiao Yin'gu (萧寅谷)
- Mao Zedong (毛泽东)
- Sun Ke (孙科)
- Xu Qian (徐谦)
- Deng Yanda (邓演达)
- Tan Yankai (谭延闿)
- Tang Shengzhi (唐生智)
- Zhang Fakui (张发奎)
- Tan Pingshan (谭平山)

== See also ==
- Plough flag
- Committees of Poor Peasants
- Peng Pai
- Mao Zedong
- Tan Pingshan
- Chinese Communist Party
- All-China Federation of Trade Unions
- All-China Women's Federation
- Communist Youth League of China
- Young Pioneers of China
- Chinese Civil War
- Chinese Red Army
- Peasant Movement Training Institute
- Hailufeng Soviet
- Autumn Harvest Uprising
- Nanchang uprising
- Land reform
- People's Commune
