= Krestintern =

International peasants' organization

Peasant International
- Letterhead used for Krestintern correspondence, 1924
- Abbreviation: Krestintern
- Formation: 10 October 1923
- Dissolved: 1939
- Type: Federation
- Purpose: World federation of radical peasant parties
- Location: Moscow, Soviet Union
- Region served: Eastern Europe, Asia
- Members: 40 countries maximum
- Chairman of the International Peasant Council: Aleksandr Petrovich Smirnov (first); Vasil Kolarov (last)
- Parent organization: Communist International

The Peasant International (Russian: Крестьянский Интернационал), known most commonly by its Russian abbreviation Krestintern (Крестинтерн), was an international peasants' organization formed by the Communist International (Comintern) in October 1923. The organization attempted to achieve united front relations with radical peasant parties in Eastern Europe and Asia, without lasting success. After failing to make headway with important initiatives in Bulgaria, Yugoslavia, and China in the 1920s, the organization was placed on hiatus at the end of the decade. The so-called Red Peasant International was formally dissolved in 1939.

== Organizational history ==
=== Background ===
The idea for a Red Peasant International is commonly credited to Polish Communist Tomasz Dąbal, a former member of the Polish Peasant Party and representative elected to the Polish parliament. On 19 June 1923, Dąbal published an article in the Soviet Communist Party's daily newspaper, Pravda, noting a surge in popularity of peasants' political parties, particularly in Eastern Europe, and arguing that these organizations might provide fertile soil for the sowing of Communist ideas among the peasantry. Dąbal suggested that the Communist International should form such an organization to facilitate the establishment of united front political activities between communist and peasants' parties in Europe.

The Comintern had already established similar organizations for the radical youth movement and the trade union movement — the Young Communist International (KIM) and the Red International of Labor Unions (Profintern), respectively — and the idea that a radical international for peasants should be established under Comintern auspices. With the pro-peasant New Economic Policy in full swing in Soviet Russia, the idea for international organization of peasants quickly gained institutional traction.

=== Establishment ===
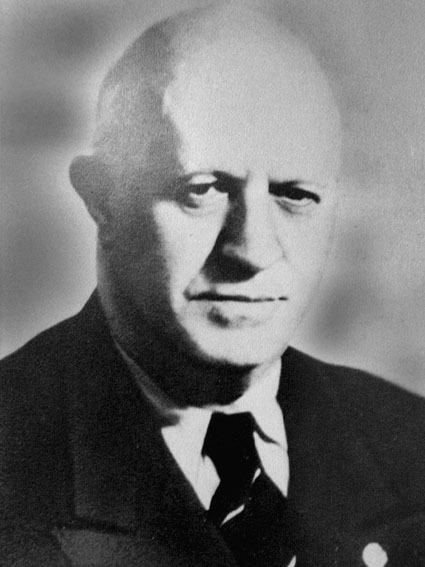
Bulgarian communist Vasil Kolarov was head of the Krestintern during its waning years, leading the organization from 1928 until its demise in 1939

The Red Peasant International was established at a founding congress held in Moscow from 10–16 October 1923. The gathering was attended by 158 delegates, hailing from 40 countries, with a majority of participants representing countries in Eastern Europe and Asia. This gathering established a governing body comparable to the Executive Committee of the Communist International known as the International Peasant Council. Two major plenary sessions of the International Peasant Council were held — the first in October 1923 and the second in November 1927.

The formal head of the new organization at the time of its formation was A. P. Smirnov, although Dąbal emerged as the organization's leading public spokesman. Smirnov remained in place as the organization's chief until 1928.

In 1928 Smirnov was replaced as the top official of the Peasant International by Bulgarian Communist Vasil Kolarov, long a top figure of the Comintern. Kolarov served as chairman of a new governing body for the organization known as the Executive Committee of the Krestintern.

=== Activities ===
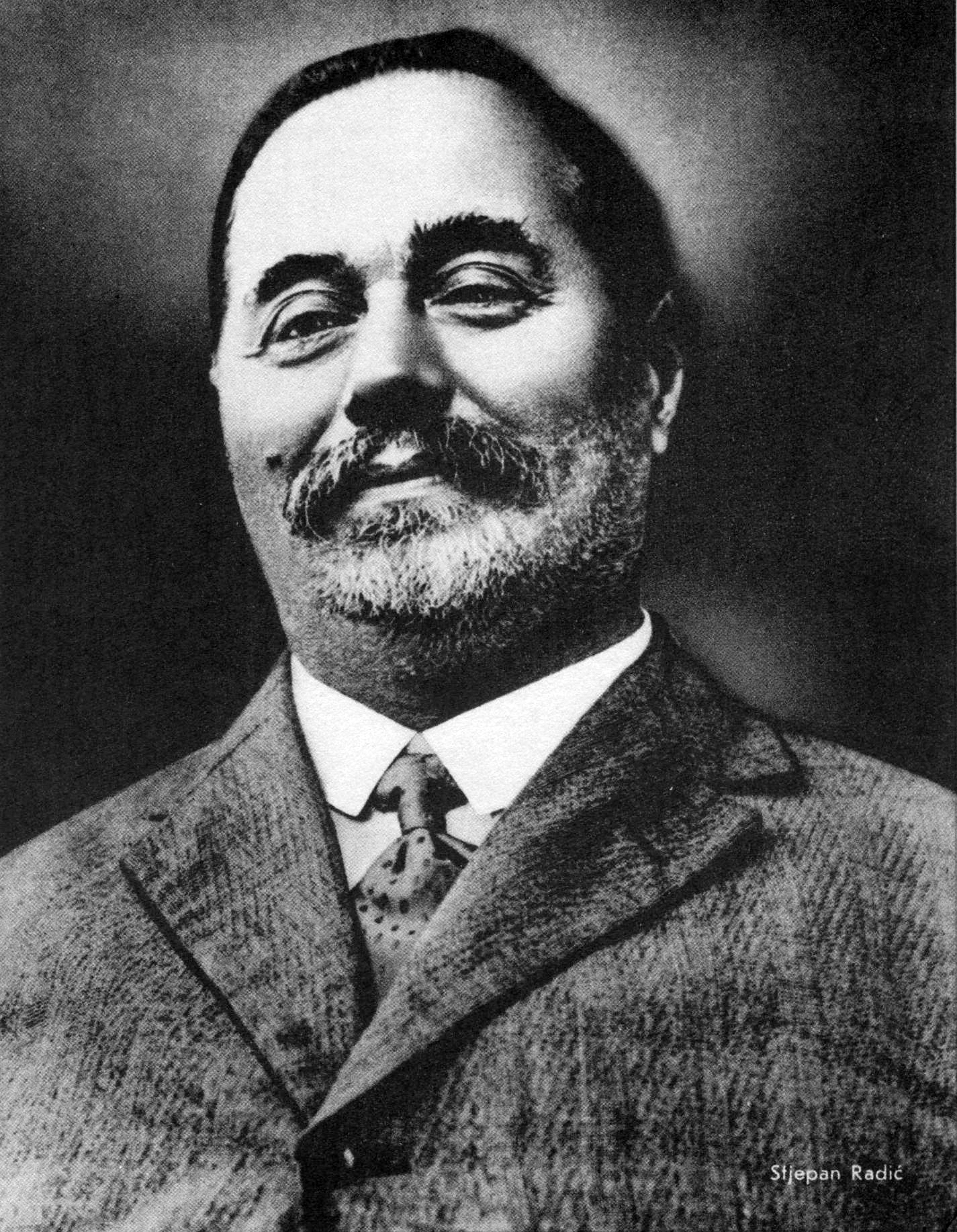
Stjepan Radić, head of the Croatian Republican Peasant Party, who briefly affiliated his organization with the Krestintern in 1924-25

The Krestintern initially sought to build common cause with the Bulgarian Peasants Union, an organization established in exile in Yugoslavia by two former ministers of the government of Aleksandar Stamboliyski following his government's overthrow by a military coup in June 1923. One of these ministers, K. Todorov, travelled to Moscow early in January 1924 where he conducted negotiations with Georgi Dimitrov and Vasil Kolarov regarding joint action between their organization and the Communist Party of Bulgaria for the overthrow of the newly imposed Aleksandar Tsankov regime. The Bulgarian communists sought without success for Todorov to align his organization with the newly established Krestintern; for his part Todorov sought money and arms for use against the Tsankov government. Some Comintern money changed hands, but no alignment of the Peasants Union with the Peasant International or change of regime in Bulgaria was forthcoming.

The Krestintern was largely unsuccessful in its task of gathering and mobilizing non-Communist peasants' political parties to advance Communist ends and was only able to attract a small number of factional grouplets, these frequently being artificial creations of the various national communist parties themselves. The sole exception to this rule was the brief and nominal adherence of the Croatian Republican Peasant Party (HRSS) headed by Stjepan Radić in 1924 during a visit to Moscow. This affiliation is judged by historian E. H. Carr to have had less to do with Communism than with the national aspirations of non-Serbian ethnicities inside Yugoslavia. The close relations between Radić's organization and the Soviets led to a banning of the HRSS and its official publication, the magazine Radnik (The Worker), were officially banned on 12 July 1924. The journal continued to be issued illegally for a short time before being terminated at the end of September. Radić was imprisoned within months of his return to Yugoslavia and the Central Committee of the now-banned HRSS was quick to renounce his seemingly rash decision to affiliate with Moscow. Rather than bolstering the political position of his organization, Radić's alliance with the Peasant International seemed to have gone far to bringing about its demise. Four months after his release from prison in July 1925, Radić and his party endorsed the monarchy and the Yugoslav constitution and joined the government. The Communist Party of Yugoslavia criticized Radić for having made a "shameful capitulation." The Krestintern's "united front" strategy fell to failure.

The Krestintern published an official organ called The Peasant International to propagate its political views. The magazine was launched in April 1924 and included articles by Japanese communist Sen Katayama and Nguyễn Ái Quốc (Ho Chi Minh) of Vietnam, emphasizing the new International's goal of building the radical agrarian movement of Asia in addition to its plan to build bridges to Eastern European peasant parties.

In 1926 the Krestintern attempted to help broker cooperative relations between the Chinese Communist Party (CCP) and the Kuomintang (KMT) headed by Chiang Kai-shek. The presidium of the International Peasant Council, the top leadership of the Peasant International, issued an open letter to the Kuomintang and its peasant section at the end of April of that year, expressing supreme confidence in that organization as "the center which rallies, unites, and organizes all the revolutionary forces against the pressure of the reactionaries and imperialists." Chiang parlayed this relationship into Soviet aid and a list of CCP members — assets which were later used in a formidable and partially successful effort to annihilate the CCP in the Shanghai massacre of 1927. The Krestintern's activities in China once again proved ineffective for advancing Comintern policy interests. Also in 1926 the Krestintern established a research facility in Moscow for the study of agrarian problems and the publication of books on these topics, known as the International Agrarian Institute. This subdivision of the Peasant International actually continued to exist for several years past the demise of its parent organization, publishing books through 1942, when the German invasion in World War II forced its termination.

=== Later years and dissolution ===
The period of pro-peasant moderation exemplified by the New Economic Policy came to an abrupt end in 1928, marked by a return to forced requisitioning in an attempt to alleviate the Grain Crisis of 1928. Serious efforts to advance a united front with the peasantry through the Red Peasant International seem to have been abandoned at this time, although the organization remained nominally functional for nearly a decade further.

In 1930, a new communist-backed agrarian organization called the European Peasant Committee was unveiled in Berlin. As was the case with the Peasant International, this group proved a failure in its design to attract peasants and peasant organizations to the communist banner. The grim brutality of forced collectivization, followed by agrarian collapse and a massive famine in 1932–1933 essentially terminated any chance for a reestablishment of the so-called smychka between urban-oriented communist movement and the peasantry in ensuing years.

== International gatherings ==
Event	Location	Date	Notes
Founding Congress	Moscow	10–16 October 1923	Attended by 158 delegates from 40 countries.
First Plenum of International Peasant Council	Moscow	October 1923	
Second Enlarged Plenum of International Peasant Council	Moscow	9 April-??, 1925	Attended by 78 delegates from 39 countries. (Carr 8:954)
Second Congress	Moscow	November 1927	
Third Plenum of International Peasant Council	Moscow	November 1927	

== Affiliated organizations ==
- Croatian People's Peasants Party (affiliated 1924–1925)
- Irish Working Farmers' Committee
- Mexican peasants' leagues (affiliated in 1923)
- Philippine Confederation of Peasants (Katipunan ng mga Anakpawis ng Pilipinas) (affiliated in 1929)
- Chinese Peasants' Association

== See also ==
- International Agrarian Bureau
- Profintern
- Sportintern
- Kultintern
