= Revolution is not a dinner party =

Phrase coined by Mao Zedong

- Initiator: Mao Zedong
- Origin: Report on an Investigation of the Peasant Movement in Hunan

Revolution is not a dinner party
- Simplified Chinese: 革命不是请客吃饭
- Traditional Chinese: 革命不是請客吃飯
- Literal meaning: revolution is not inviting guests to eat a meal
Transcriptions
Standard Mandarin
- Hanyu Pinyin: Gémìng bùshì qǐngkè chīfàn
- Wade–Giles: Ko-ming pu-shih ch'ing-k'o ch’ih-fan

Revolution is not a dinner party, or making revolution is not inviting people over for dinner, is a phrase coined by Mao Zedong. It is taken from Mao's essay titled Report on an Investigation of the Peasant Movement in Hunan written in 1927 during the Land Revolution. It means that a revolution cannot be gentle and soft, but determined and thorough, and it is a violent and bloody action of one class overthrowing another.

In this report, Mao stated that "A revolution is not a dinner party, or writing an essay, or painting a picture, or doing embroidery; it cannot be so refined, so leisurely and gentle, so temperate, kind, courteous, restrained and magnanimous. A revolution is an insurrection, an act of violence by which one class overthrows another."

Based on this view, historian Zhang Ming further pointed out that "a revolution is not a dinner party, a revolution is a petition to eat". The saying is also the basis of a political joke: "for many cadres Geming bushi qingke jiushi chifan 'Revolution is not entertaining guests, just eating dinner [at public expense or at the cost of the nouveaux riches]."

In late 1966, during the early Cultural Revolution, the Chinese composer Li Jiefu (李劫夫, 1913–1976) composed a communist revolutionary song based on Mao's saying, entitled "Geming Bu Shi Qingke Chifan"《革命不是请客吃饭》(Revolution is Not a Dinner Party), and it was recorded and disseminated across China soon thereafter.

== See also ==
- Political power grows out of the barrel of a gun
