= Emblem of the Turkmen Soviet Socialist Republic =

- Armiger: Turkmen Soviet Socialist Republic
- Adopted: 2 March 1937
- Crest: Red star
- Supporters: Cotton, wheat and grapes
- Motto: «Әxли юртлариң пролетарлары, бирлешиң!» (Turkmen) «Пролетарии всех стран, соединяйтесь!» (Russian) ("Workers of the world, unite!")
Earlier version(s)

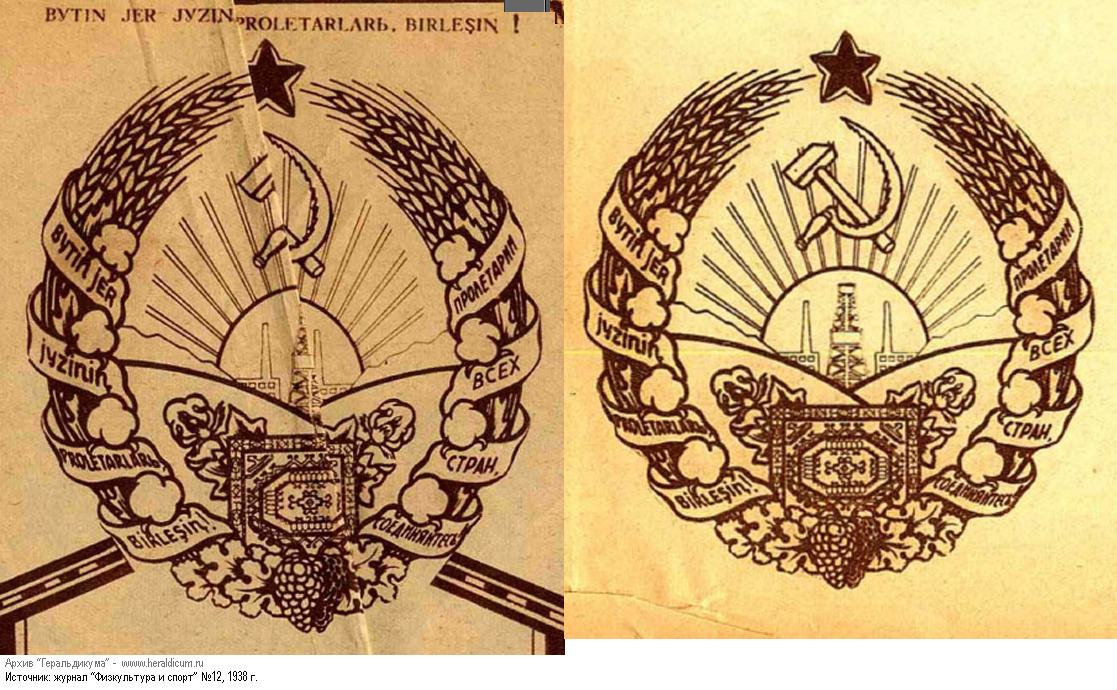

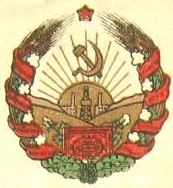

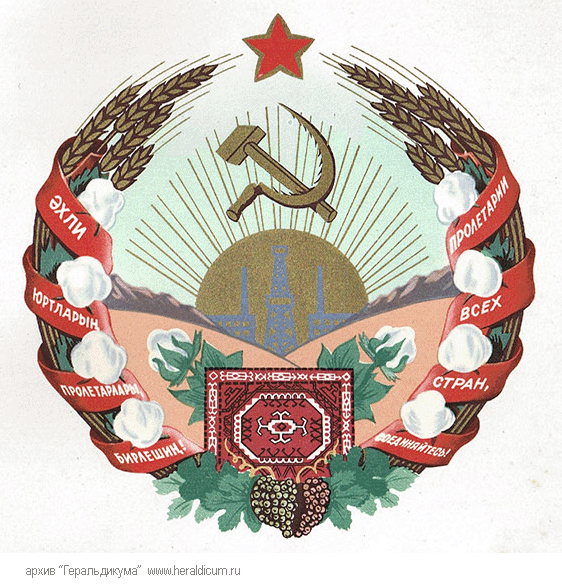

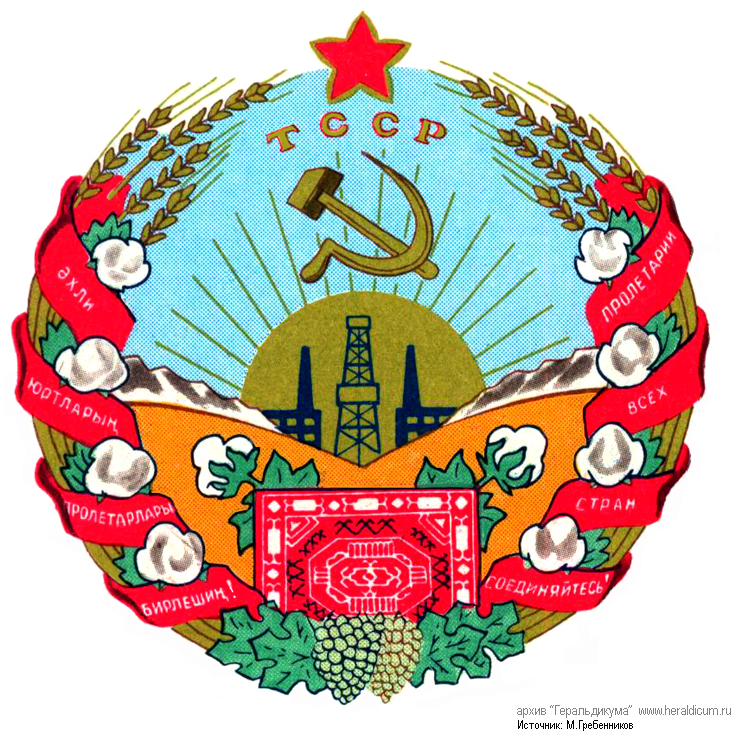
1926-1927
1927-1937
1937-1941
1941-1946
1946-1978
1978-1985

The Emblem of the Turkmen Soviet Socialist Republic was adopted on 2 March 1937 by the government of the Turkmen Soviet Socialist Republic. The coat of arms is based on the coat of arms of the Soviet Union. It shows symbols of agriculture (cotton, wheat and grapes) and heavy industry (oil derrick and pipeline), as well as a symbol of the Turkmen people, a rug. The rising Sun stands for the future of the Turkmen nation, the red star as well as the hammer and sickle for the victory of Communism and the "world-wide socialist community of states".

The banner bears the Soviet Union state motto ("Workers of the world, unite!") in both the Russian and Turkmen languages. In Turkmen, it is "Әxли юртлариң пролетарлары, бирлешиң!" (in the current Turkmen Latin script: "Ähli ýurtlaryň proletarlary, birleşiň!").

Later version of the coat of arms had acronym "TSSR" between red star, above, and hammer and sickle, below.

The emblem was changed in 1992 to the present Emblem of Turkmenistan, which however, retains some of the parts of the Soviet one. In this case, wheat, cotton and the Turkmen rug.

== History ==
=== First version ===
For some time after its formation the Turkmen SSR had no state symbols. On August 9, 1925, the Turkmen Central Executive Committee informed the Central Executive Committee of the Union that Turkmenistan was still using the coat of arms of the USSR. On May 26, 1926, the Turkmen CEC established a commission for the development of the coat of arms, and on August 18, 1926, the Central Executive Committee of the TSSR decided to adopt the design of the emblem by Andrei Andreevich Karelin as the basis for the state emblem of the Turkmen SSR. The design was as following :

- A round shield placed on a turquoise background in the rays of the rising sun.
- The shield is divided into 4 parts, at the intersection of the separation lines there was a salor gol (a pattern placed traditionally in the center of the carpet).
- There were four figures in the shield. The figures are mulberry leaf, mulberry butterfly, and cocoon, clusters of grapes, a camel and a tractor, and branches of cotton.
- The shield is surrounded by a wreath of wheat ears, six times intertwined with a red ribbon.
- On the side interceptions of the tape through the coil was the inscription "Workers of all countries, unite!" (on the left - in Russian and Armenian, on the right - in Turkmen and Persian languages).
- An anvil and a hammer were placed below, a red star was placed between the upper ends of the ears.

At the third session of the Central Executive Committee of the USSR (October 1-6, 1926), the emblem was approved.

==== First revision ====
The Second All-Turkmen Congress of Soviets from 26 March until 3 April 1927 adopted the Constitution of the Soviet Socialist Republic of Turkmenistan, according to which the arms were slightly modified:

- a mulberry leaf, a butterfly was replaced by a herd of sheep and goats with a Turkmen shepherd against the background of the Kopet Dag mountains;
- a driver and a plow are added to the tractor
- Bunches of grapes are replaced by one ripe bunch;
- branches of cotton replaced by one branch with two open boxes.
- The motto began to be written in two languages: Russian and Turkmen.

In the Constitution of the Turkmen SSR that was created on October 6, 1926 and approved by the 2nd All-Turkmen Congress of Soviets on April 1, 1927, the coat of arms is described in Article 82:

The state emblem of the Turkmen Socialist Soviet Republic consists of an image of a golden wreath of ears, wrapped in scarlet ribbon in three intercepts on each side with an inscription on the left upper and middle interceptions:" Workers of all countries, unite! "In Russian and on the same intercepts with right side of the wreath of the same slogan in the Turkmen language, the bottom of the wreath has an interception with the same ribbon.

At the bottom of the wreath on the golden disk of the sun is an image of a sickle and a hammer and an anvil of steel color. The handle of the sickle and hammer of the color of the tree is captured by the lower tape interception, the crescent being located on the lower left intercept of the tape, and the hammer on the right lower intercept. At the top between the ends of the ears is a five-pointed red star, surrounded by a golden fringe. In the middle of the wreath is a crimson circle, divided by two intersecting crimson lines into 4 equal parts. The upper ends of the scarlet ribbon, engaging the wreath, touch the crimson line of the circle. In the middle of the field of the circle there is a magenta of roses (gul) with crimson strips of the same width as the circle. In the center of this frame is a simplified drawing of this rose. In the left upper part of the field of the circle are depicted: against the backdrop of the Kopet-Dag mountains, a flock of sheep and goats with a Turkmen shepherd. In the right upper part of the circle on the continuation of the background of the Kopet-Dag mountains there are images of a tractor with a plow and a chauffeur and behind a camel tractor. In the lower left part of the circle on a golden background is a bunch of mature grapes with 3 leaves. In the lower part of the circle on the silver field is a branch of cotton with two mature open boxes filled with cotton.

The field between the wreath, the sun and the star is turquoise.

— Constitution of the Turkmen SSR (1927), Article 82

==== Second revision ====
By the decree of the Central Executive Committee of the USSR on 1927 the inscriptions on the coat of arms were changed from Arabic letters to Latin letters. the motto in the Turkmen language on it should be: "ВIRLEŞIꞐ, ВYTIIN JER JYZINIꞐ JOOQSЬLLARЬ!". There was another addition in the lower part of the coat of arms between the shield and the frame, which is the abbreviation "T.S.Ş.Ç." for Tyrkmenistaan Sosьjaaʟ Şuuraaʟar Çemhuurijeti.

This change itself is earlier than the official transition from the Arabic letters to Latin letters. Only in 1928, with the approval January 3, 1928 by the Central Executive Committee of the Turkmen SSR the Arabic alphabet was replaced by the Latin alphabet. The final transition to the Latin letters in all official spheres was carried out by May 1929.

=== Second version ===
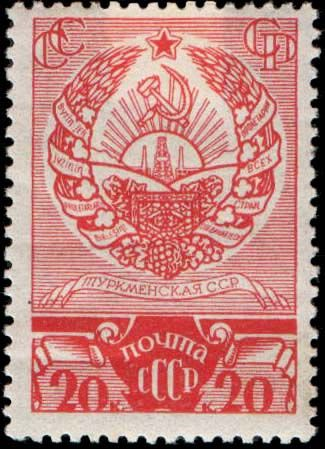
Emblem of the Turkmen SSR on a 1937 postage stamp

At the end of 1936, according to the draft of the new Constitution, the state emblem consisted of an image of a golden sickle and a hammer, a red star against the background of the rising sun, framed with a wreath of blossoming cotton and ears, and a red ribbon with the inscription: "Workers of all countries, unite!" - in Turkmen and Russian. The author of the project was the artist Alexander Pavlovich Vladychuk.

The project of the emblem was discussed by the general public and was not recognized as successful. So, Professor A. Potseluevsky believed that "the design of the state emblem would be quite consistent with its purpose, if Turkmenistan was only an agrarian country. Meanwhile, the Turkmen SSR is an industrial-agrarian country, and therefore it is necessary to introduce some emblem of the industry in its arms." This was not just a proposal, but an expression of pride in the successes of socialist construction of a previously backward people. Potseluevsky suggested introducing an element reflecting and developing the industry. As such, an emblem to take factory buildings

The Extraordinary VI All-Turkmen Congress of Soviets on March 2, 1937, adopts the new Constitution, in 121 of which the emblem is described:

The state emblem of the Turkmen Soviet Socialist Republic consists of a picture of a sickle and a hammer, a red star, factory buildings framed with a wreath of uncovered cotton and ears, a carpet woven with a red ribbon with the inscription: "Workers of all countries, unite!" - in Turkmen and Russian. Emblems - factory buildings and carpet - reflected the general ideas of Soviet power and the specifics of the development of the republic.

— Constitution of the Turkmen SSR (1937), Article 121

==== First revision ====
In 1940, the letters Turkmen language was converted into Cyrillic, according to the law of May 14, 1940, adopted at the IV session of the Supreme Soviet of the USSR. According to the Decree of the Presidium of the Supreme Council of Turkmenistan dated April 28, 1941, the text of the inscriptions on the arms was written according to the new alphabet.

The inscription of the motto in the Turkmen Cyrillic alphabet: "БҮТИН ЕР ЙҮЗИНИҢ ПРОЛЕТАРЛАРЫ, БИРЛЕШИҢ"

==== Second revision ====
After the creation of a new coat of arms of the USSR in 1946, the translation of the motto into the Turkmen language was clarified. The translation of the motto was changed as "ӘХЛИ ЮРТЛАРЫҢ ПРОЛЕТАРЛАРЫ, БИРЛЕШИҢ!". Before that, the translation of the motto in the Turkmen language sounded like "Proletarians of the whole earth, unite!". According to the commission created by the Presidium of the USSR Supreme Council in 1937, the translation of the previous slogan, which was made in the 1930s was inaccurate.

==== Third revision ====
After the adoption of the all-Union Constitution in 1977, the new Constitution of the Turkmen SSR was adopted at the extraordinary, 9th session of the Supreme Soviet of the Turkmen SSR, on the ninth convocation on April 13, 1978. According to the new constitution, a new description of the arms was given in Article 168:

The State Emblem of the Turkmen Soviet Socialist Republic is an image of a sickle and a hammer, buildings of industrial enterprises and a derrick against the background of a rising sun framed with ears of wheat and open cotton, carpet and grape clusters with an inscription on a red ribbon - on the left in Turkmen language : "ӘХЛИ ЮРТЛАРЫҢ ПРОЛЕТАРЛАРЫ, БИРЛЕШИҢ!", and the right in Russian : "ПРОЛЕТАРИИ ВСЕХ СТРАН, СОЕДИНЯЙТЕСЬ!" At the top of the emblem is a five-pointed star, under the star above the rays of the rising sun, the inscription: "ТССР".

— Constitution of the Turkmen SSR (1978), Article 168

The small change of the coat of arms was the addition of the abbreviated name of the country under the star, the amount of sunlight decreased, and the change of the carpet pattern.

== See also ==
- Emblem of Turkmenistan
