= Report on an Investigation of the Peasant Movement in Hunan =

1927 essay by Mao Zedong

- Cover art of the 1963 English edition.
- Author: Mao Zedong (Mao Tse-tung)
- Original title: 湖南農民運動考察報告; Húnán Nóngmín Yùndòng Kǎochá Bàogào
- Translator: Central Compilation and Translation Bureau
- Language: Chinese
- Published: 1927
- Publication place: China

Report on an Investigation of the Peasant Movement in Hunan or Inquiry into the Peasant Movement of Hunan of March 1927, often called the Hunan Report, is one of Mao Zedong's most famous and influential essays. The Report is based on a several month visit to his home countryside around Changsha, capital of Hunan in early 1927. The Report endorses the violence that had broken out spontaneously in the wake of the Northern Expedition, makes a class analysis of the struggle, and enthusiastically reports the "Fourteen Great Achievements" of the peasant associations (農民協會; 农民协会).

At a time when the strategy of the Chinese Communist Party was based on urban workers, Mao advocated a revolution based on the peasantry, especially poor peasants. He emphasized that violent and ritualistic struggle was the most effective method of striking against class enemies. The Hunan Report's emphasis on the peasantry, including their violent struggle against the landlord class, gradually become the dominant strategy in the Communist Party's land reform on its road to victory in 1949.

The rhetoric of the Hunan Report was taken up by radicals in the Chinese Cultural Revolution and by radical groups around the world, such as the Naxalites in India and the Shining Path in Peru, to follow Mao's example to "surround the cities from the countryside" by building power in the villages with violence.

== Background ==
Mao left his home village in Hunan to graduate from Hunan Normal University, then become a teacher and labor organizer after joining the Communist Party. He was impressed by the Guangdong communist leader, Peng Pai. a radical intellectual who would organize the peasants of his home districts into Hailufeng Soviet, which redistributed land and promoted social change. When the Communists joined the Nationalists in the First United Front, Peng headed the Peasant Movement Training Institute, of which Mao became co-leader.

The Nationalists, with communist and Soviet support, launched the Northern Expedition in 1925 to unite the country and oust the imperialists, setting off mass demonstrations in the cities and uprisings of peasant associations in the countryside. Communists went out to peasant organizations in advance of the army to assist the peasants in opposing the warlords and their landlord allies. Weakened by the peasants and communists, the warlords and their social base were more easily defeated by the soldiers of the Northern Expedition. This combined peasant organization and military force was the highwater mark of Nationalist and Communist Cooperation.

However, leadership of both parties questioned whether the peasant associations should be encouraged in their violence and attacks on landlords. Chen Duxiu, the communist leader, believed that consistent with an orthodox Marxist view, the base of the party should be urban workers, with peasants merely adjacent to this strategy. Reports from the countryside were scattered and unreliable. Mao, recognized by both parties as an expert on peasants, was sent to Hunan to investigate local conditions in areas through which Northern Expedition troops had just passed. He published his report in Zhongyang Fukan (Central Committee Periodical) 28 March 1927.

== Content ==
In this report, Mao Zedong details the actions and achievements of the Chinese peasants in Hunan in an attempt to sway his fellow revolutionaries' opinions on the capabilities of peasantry to communist revolution in China. This article was written as a reply to the criticisms both inside and outside the Party then being leveled at the Chinese Peasantry. Mao had spent thirty-two days in Hunan Province making an investigation and wrote this report in order to answer to the criticisms of the leadership of the CCP towards the peasantry. Throughout the report, advocated a then heretical strategy of mobilizing poor peasants to carry out "struggle" (douzheng). Mao from that point on rejected the idea of peaceful land reform, arguing that peasants could not achieve true liberation unless they participated in the violent overthrow of the landlords. In Mao's view, the significance of the peasant organizations was that they had spontaneously organized themselves despite centuries of oppression in which they had been told that their social position was fated by Heaven. He described the peasants as having the historic mission to overthrow the landlords and work with the urban proletariat to jointly liberate China from its oppressors.

The Report is divided into eight chapters:

1. The Importance of the Peasant Problem
2. Get Organized
3. Down with the Local Tyrants and Evil Gentry! All Power to the Peasant Associations!
4. "It's Terrible!" or "It's Fine!"
5. The Question of "Going too Far"
6. The Movement of the "Riffraff"
7. Vanguards of the Revolution

The Report concludes by describing "Fourteen Great Achievements":

1. Organizing the Peasants into Peasant Associations
2. Hitting the Landlords Politically
3. Hitting the Landlords Economically
4. Overthrowing the Feudal Rule of the Local Tyrants and Evil Gentry—Smashing the Tu and Tuan
5. Overthrowing the Armed Forces of the Landlords and Establishing Those of the Peasants
6. Overthrowing the Political Power of the County Magistrate and His Bailiffs
7. Overthrowing the Clan Authority of the Ancestral Temples and Clan Elders, the Religious Authority of Town and Village Gods, and the Masculine Authority of Husbands
8. Spreading Political Propaganda
9. Peasant Bans and Prohibitions
10. Eliminating Banditry
11. Abolishing Exorbitant Levies
12. The Movement for Education
13. The Co-operative Movement
14. Building Roads and Repairing Embankments

== Argument ==
The first section, "The Importance of the Peasant Problem" reported that he had spent thirty-two days gathering information and found that "many of the hows and whys of the peasant movement were the exact opposite of what the gentry in Hankou and Changsha were saying." He saw violent and spontaneous peasant uprising

In a very short time, in China's central, southern and northern provinces, several hundred million peasants will rise like a mighty storm, like a hurricane, a force so swift and violent that no power, however great, will be able to hold it back. They will smash all the trammels that bind them and rush forward along the road to liberation. They will sweep all the imperialists, warlords, corrupt officials, local tyrants and evil gentry into their graves. Every revolutionary party and every revolutionary comrade will be put to the test, to be accepted or rejected as they decide. There are three alternatives. To march at their head and lead them. To trail behind them, gesticulating and criticizing. Or to stand in their way and oppose them. Every Chinese is free to choose, but events will force you to make the choice quickly.

The main targets of attack by the peasants were the "local tyrants, the evil gentry and the lawless landlords, but in passing they also hit out against patriarchal ideas and institutions, against the corrupt officials in the cities and against bad practices and customs in the rural areas." The poorest peasants were the "most revolutionary group" and would be the most reliable in the overthrow of the "patriarchal-feudal class."

Mao's report directly addressed those in the party who objected to the peasants using violence in their liberation:

It is fine. It is not "terrible" at all. It is anything but "terrible." ... "It's terrible!" is obviously a theory for combatting the rise of the peasants in the interests of the landlords; it is obviously a theory of the landlord class for preserving the old feudal order and obstructing the establishment of the new democratic order; it is obviously a counterrevolutionary theory.

In this context, Mao also coined his famous saying that revolution is not a dinner party:

Revolution is not a dinner party, nor an essay, nor a painting, nor a piece of embroidery; it cannot be so refined, so leisurely and gentle, so temperate, kind, courteous, restrained and magnanimous. A revolution is an insurrection, an act of violence by which one class overthrows another.... Without using the greatest force, the peasants cannot possibly overthrow the deep-rooted authority of the landlords which has lasted for thousands of years.

The poor peasants, Mao continued, "have always been the main force in the bitter fight in the countryside. They have fought militantly through the two periods of underground work and of open activity. They are the most responsive to Communist Party leadership. They are deadly enemies of the camp of the local tyrants and evil gentry and attack it without the slightest hesitation."

In the report, Mao described how peasants experienced a triple subordination: (1) to the dominance of clan authority (i.e. lineage organizations), (2) to landowners, and (3) to "spirits." Mao also noted that peasant women experienced a fourth form of subordination, subordination to the marital authority of their husbands.

== Significance and analysis ==
The peasant strategy did not immediately lead to success, since neither local peasant associations nor the Party could stand up to the guns and organization of the local power holders or Chiang Kai-shek's armies. Following the Shanghai Massacre and subsequent White Terror conducted by the Nationalists, the Communists were almost wiped out and forced from their urban base. Mao summarized the lesson he learned in another famous slogan, "power grows from the barrel of a gun." He and Zhu De then organized the Chinese Red Army and established an independent rural base. He replied to critics in 1930, "A single spark can start a prairie fire."

But the Hunan Report marked a decisive turning point in the revolutionary strategy that eventually brought the Party to power in 1949. Roy Hofheinz, Jr. writes that Mao's contribution at the time was not policy, since he skirts the issues of land confiscation or ownership, but criticizing leaders for not taking a "revolutionary" attitude. His innovation was the insistence that only the poorest, the poor peasants were able to turn things upside down. The ruling class must be destroyed, for a "revolution is an "act of violence whereby one class overthrows another". Only the landless peasants and "riff-raff" could be relied on, because the middle-peasants would pander to the ruling class either knowingly or without realizing it. Mao attacked Nationalist and Communist leaders who looked down on these peasants and deplored violence, for violence was to be celebrated.

Maurice Meisner points out that the report contained two "heresies" from the point of view of the orthodox position of the Party in its time. First and most generally, Mao bypassed the urban proletariat and second, relied to some extent on the initiative of the peasantry, not the Communist Party or the Comintern. The word "hurricane" showed Mao did not see the need for extensive organizing or deep preparation. The "single spark" strategy await the painful and slow development of capitalism or the bourgeois stage of history to prepare for the eventual revolution in the future. Meisner notes the irony: had not the White Terror nearly destroyed the fledgling Party and driven it from the cities, Mao's heresies might have cut short his career as a Communist.

Elizabeth Perry adds that the Report set the standard for understanding public emotions, for Mao's principle of "without investigation, no one has the right to speak," and the mass line, which needed organizers to understand the target audience to be mobilized.

Another feature that was to some extent less common for the time was the special attention to women. The Report argued that while men were oppressed by political authority, clan authority, and religious authority, women were "also dominated by men."

== Legacy ==
Zhou Libo's 1948 novel The Hurricane and William Hinton's Fanshen: A Documentary of Revolution in a Chinese Village (1966) were both works on the general time and place, which, in their dramatized form, had suggested moral legitimacy to events around those described in the report.

During the Cultural Revolution, the Quotations from Chairman Mao Tse-tung (Little Red Book) spread slogans taken from the Report widely and Mao's secretary and ideological advisor Chen Boda published a pamphlet analyzing its message and importance. The Report furnished inspiration for various Maoist groups around the world, in particular the most relevant being the Naxalites in India, Sendero Luminosa in Peru. Also it was to some degree influential with the Black Panthers in the United States.

== Publication and translations ==
- First published in Zhongyang Fukan (Central Committee Periodical) 28 March 1927.
- The official text, in Selected Works of Mao Tse-tung. Volume I, pp 23–59. Available online at Marxists.org. here. It has been edited to reflect the official interpretation of the time.
- Minoru Takeuchi, ed., 毛澤東集 (Mo Takuto Ji Collected Writings of Mao Tse-Tung). (Tokyo: Suo suo sha, 1983). ISBN Volume 1:207-49. Text from 1944 and 1947 Chinese editions of Mao's Selected Works.
- Stuart R. Schram and Nancy Jane Hodes, ed., Mao's Road to Power: Revolutionary Writings 1912–1949. Volume II.. (Armonk, N.Y.; London: M.E. Sharpe, 1994). ISBN 1563244306 . pp. 429–64. Translates and annotates the Takeuchi text.
- Cheek, Timothy, ed. (2002), Mao Zedong and China's Revolutions: A Brief History with Documents, NY: Palgrave, ISBN 0312294298, pp. 41–75. Reprints the Schram/ Hodes text.
- WorldCat Formats and editions. Chinese and foreign language editions.
