= Qiu Dongping =

Chinese writer

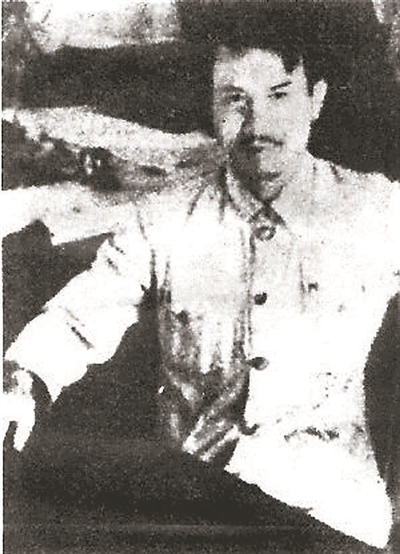
- Born: Qiu Tanyue; May 16, 1910; Mafulan Village, Meilong Town, Haifeng County, Huizhou, Guangdong, Qing dynasty
- Died: July 24, 1941 (aged 31) †; Beiqinzhuang, Qingfeng Town, Yancheng County (now Jianhu County), Jiangsu, Republic of China (1912–1949)
- Occupation: Writer
- Spouse(s): Wu Xiao; Xin Wen
- Children: 1 daughter, Qiu Liqing
- Writing career
- Pen name: Dongping
- Period: 1932–1941
- Genres: Fiction, documentary literature
- Notable works: The Melancholy City of Meileng, The Seventh Company, Under Mount Mao

Personal details
- Party: Chinese Communist Party

Military service
- Allegiance: Chinese Communist Party
- Branch/service: National Revolutionary Army; 19th Route Army; New Fourth Army
- Battles/wars: Second Sino-Japanese War †

Qiu Dongping (May 16, 1910 – July 24, 1941), originally named Qiu Tanyue, also used the name Qiu Tanye, with courtesy names Xizhen and Shuozhen. His pen name Dongping became so widely used that he was generally known as Qiu Dongping. He was a modern Chinese writer from Haifeng, Guangdong.

Qiu Dongping joined the Chinese Communist Party (CCP) in 1926 and participated in the Hailufeng Uprising the following year. After the uprising failed, he fled to Hong Kong and began his literary career. Following the Mukden Incident in 1931, Qiu returned to China to devote himself to the anti‑Japanese national salvation movement. He took part in the Battle of Shanghai (1932), the Fujian Incident, and the Liangguang Incident, and was active in organizations such as the League of Left-Wing Writers and the Chinese National Revolutionary Alliance. After the Marco Polo Bridge Incident in 1937, Qiu went to the front lines of the War of Resistance against Japan. In 1938 he joined the New Fourth Army and accompanied the troops as they advanced into enemy‑occupied areas in southern and northern Jiangsu. On 24 July 1941, Qiu Dongping was killed in action during an anti‑mop‑up operation in northern Jiangsu.

Qiu Dongping was closely associated with Hu Feng, and many of his works were published in Hu Feng's magazine July. Thus, Qiu is regarded as an important representative of the July faction. His literary output consisted mainly of fiction and documentary literature, and his extensive writings on the war against Japan have earned him recognition as a pioneer of modern Chinese war literature. His style tends to explore the psychological and personal character of his subjects against a somber, oppressive atmosphere. His major works include the short‑story collection The Melancholy City of Meileng, the documentary narrative The Seventh Company, and the unfinished novel Under Mount Mao.

== Biography ==
=== Early revolutionary involvement ===
Qiu Dongping was born into a family that was both peasant and small‑trader in Mafulong Village, Meilong Town, Haifeng County, Guangdong Province (Qing dynasty). He was the sixth child in the family. At the age of seven he entered a village private school. A year later he and his fifth brother enrolled in a primary school, successively studying at Banxiang Primary School in Meilong, the Shuikou Township School, and a school at the foot of Lotus Hill in the Meiling range. While in primary school, Qiu participated in the Child Labour Corps. In 1924 he was admitted to the Haifeng County Lu'an Normal School. The predecessor of Lu'an Normal School was Peng Pai's alma mater, Haifeng Middle School, and Peng frequently returned to give speeches, so Qiu was influenced by revolutionary culture. At school he joined the literary club Chenxi She (Morning Light Society) and was active in its activities. In 1925 he joined the Chinese Communist Youth League and served as secretary of the Haifeng school branch. After the victory of the National Revolutionary Army's second Eastern Expedition in October of the same year, Qiu left school and enrolled in a Haifeng party cadre training class, throwing himself into the Haifeng peasant movement.

In January 1926, Qiu Dongping became secretary‑general of the Communist Youth League's Haifeng Special Committee and took part in editing and publishing the magazine Haifeng Youth. In the same year he joined the Chinese Communist Party and served as secretary to Zheng Zhiyun, head of the Organization Department of the Hailufeng Local Committee. In 1927, Qiu participated in both of the Hailufeng Uprisings. In November 1927, under the leadership of Peng Pai, the Hailufeng Soviet was formally established as the first soviet government in China. During this period, Qiu briefly served as Peng Pai's secretary. In February 1928, the Hailufeng Soviet regime collapsed; Peng Pai evacuated, but Qiu stayed behind to continue the struggle. Faced with a mopping‑up campaign by local militia, Qiu left his hometown in August with the help of his family and was sent to Hong Kong. While living in exile in Hong Kong, he worked as an apprentice, a shoemaker, a fisherman, a peddler, and a proofreader for a Catholic publisher. Despite his impoverished life, he read extensively the works of Maxim Gorky, taught himself English, engaged in writing, participated in the activities of Hong Kong's first new‑literature group, the Island Society, and began to contribute to local newspapers.

=== Participation in the anti‑Japanese national salvation movement ===
After the Mukden Incident broke out in 1931, Qiu Dongping was introduced by his second elder brother, Qiu Guozhen, to the staff of Weng Zhaoyuan, commander of the 156th Brigade of the 78th Division of the National Revolutionary Army's 19th Route Army in Nanchang, Jiangxi Province. In 1932 he took part in the Battle of Shanghai. During the battle he co‑founded the magazine Blood Tide with his friend Chen Linggu and published many commentaries in it, criticizing social ills and encouraging resistance. After the battle ended, Qiu followed the 19th Route Army when it left Shanghai and moved into Fujian Province. While in Fujian, he was forced to leave the army after he disobeyed Weng Zhaoyuan's order to organize a mass meeting, and he returned to Hong Kong. In Hong Kong he launched the monthly New Asia Monthly, which was soon banned by the Hong Kong British authorities. Thereafter he went to Shanghai, where he met Hu Feng, Peng Baishan, Nie Gannu, and Ouyang Shan. On 15 November 1932, Qiu Dongping's short story "The Dispatch Rider" (通讯员) was published in the fourth issue of the League of Left-Wing Writers organ Literary Monthly. The story established his reputation and marked his entry into the ranks of revolutionary‑literature writers.

In November 1933, the 19th Route Army launched the Fujian Incident. Qiu returned to the army and was commissioned by its headquarters to travel from Fuzhou to Shanghai to seek contact with the CCP organization. After the Fujian Incident failed, Qiu remained in Shanghai and took part in Left‑League activities. In September 1934 he worked as a proofreader for the semi‑monthly Taibai, edited by Chen Wangdao. In the winter of that year, because of a dispute with Chen Wangdao, he left Taibai and made the acquaintance of Wu Xiru. Thereafter he shuttled between Shanghai and Hong Kong, doing united‑front work. In the spring of 1935, Qiu crossed to the Japan and took part in the activities of the Left‑League branch in Tokyo, during which time he met Guo Moruo. In the spring of 1936 he returned from Japan and participated in the activities of the Chinese National Revolutionary Alliance, organized by former 19th‑Route‑Army officers. In the summer of 1936, through a friend's introduction, he met Ye Ting in Hong Kong. In June he accompanied 19th‑Route‑Army officers in the Liangguang Incident, operating along the Guangdong–Guangxi border. In September, Qiu moved to Shanghai.

After the outbreak of the Battle of Shanghai (1937) following the August 13 Incident, Qiu Dongping collaborated with Cao Ming, Shao Zinan, Ouyang Shan, and Yu Feng to write the novella The Giver (给予者), which created one of the earliest anti‑Japanese heroic figures. In September he left Shanghai and travelled north to Nanjing and Jinan to observe the frontline. In late October, Qiu returned to Nanjing and once again met Ye Ting. He then followed Ye to Wuhan to assist in the preparations for the New Fourth Army.

=== In the New Fourth Army ===
In January 1938, Qiu Dongping followed the New Fourth Army headquarters to Nanchang and was assigned to the army's Service Corps. In April he joined the advance detachment commanded by Su Yu, which penetrated behind enemy lines in southern Jiangsu to carry out strategic reconnaissance. In June he took part in the New Fourth Army's first battle south of the Yangtze, the Battle of Weigang, and later recorded it in the piece "Interception" (截击). After the battle the advance detachment was disbanded, and Qiu was kept in the Jiangnan area by Chen Yi, serving as chief of the Enemy‑Work Section of the Political Department of the First Detachment and concurrently as Chen Yi's foreign‑affairs secretary. In July, when the First Detachment arrived in Danyang, the CCP Southern Jiangsu Working Committee was established; Qiu served as a committee member. In February 1939 he attended the New Fourth Army's all‑army political‑work conference, and in July he attended the army's first party congress. In November he became chief of the Enemy‑Work Section of the Political Department of the New Fourth Army's Jiangnan Headquarters. During this period he wrote a considerable amount of military documentary literature.

In 1940, Qiu followed Chen Yi and Su Yu across the Yangtze River and took part in the Battle of Huangqiao. In November, when the General Command of the New Fourth Army and Eighth Route Army in Central China was established in Hai'an, Jiangsu, Qiu continued to serve as head of the Enemy‑Work Department. At the same time, the Central Plains Bureau of the CCP Central Committee planned to establish a Central China branch of the Lu Xun Academy of Arts, and Qiu was a member of its preparatory committee. On 8 February 1941 the Central China Branch of the Lu Xun Academy of Arts was formally established in Yancheng; Liu Shaoqi concurrently served as its president, while Qiu Dongping became its dean of studies and de facto head of the academy. He also held a professorship in the literature department. On 17 April the Northern Jiangsu Cultural Association was founded in Yancheng, and Qiu was elected one of its first directors. During his time at the Lu Xun Academy's Central China branch, he chaired and participated in discussions on making literature and art accessible to the masses and in commemorations of the fifth anniversary of Gorky's death, advocating that artists immerse themselves in life and serve the workers, peasants, and soldiers. In June, Qiu resigned from the post of dean of studies to concentrate on writing his novel Under Mount Mao.

In July 1941, Japanese forces launched an offensive against Yancheng (part of the Salt-Funing-Suzhong Campaign). On the afternoon of 23 July, Qian Junrui arrived at the Central China Lu Xun Academy to convey military orders for an immediate evacuation. Qiu Dongping, the dramatist Xu Qing, and others led a portion of the academy's personnel and members of the New Asia Travel Troupe in a detour behind Japanese lines. At dawn on the 24th, the group reached Beiqinzhuang. In the darkness, they were surrounded by Japanese forces. The breakout was devastating: over 30 were killed, 62 were captured, and fewer than 70 ultimately escaped. Qiu Dongping was shot in the head while directing the breakout and died. The Central China Lu Xun Academy was disbanded in late August. After Qiu's death he was buried in Jianhu County, and the local party committee and government renamed the area Dongping Village in his honor.

== Literary works ==
=== Style and criticism ===
Qiu Dongping's writings consist mainly of fiction and documentary literature, largely focused on the War of Resistance against Japan. Because of his extensive war‑themed works, he has been recognized as a pioneer of modern Chinese war literature. His works generally portray ordinary people caught in a grand era, and occasionally depict senior commanders of the CCP forces. In his letters, Qiu discussed his creative philosophy, insisting that one should take a serious approach to one's literary career while maintaining a close connection with life. His early style tended to explore the psychological makeup of his characters in a somber, oppressive atmosphere. After he joined the New Fourth Army, however, his style changed, becoming suffused with optimism and a conviction in inevitable victory. In his descriptions he emphasized the shaping of character, depicting the emotional shifts of his protagonists amid fierce combat. The vivid colors of his scenes, the tragic, solemn atmosphere, and the acute sense of the times are all remarkably strong. In terms of the genre's development, Qiu shifted reportage literature from being centered on time to being centered on the individual, thereby greatly advancing the evolution of the form. His unfinished novel Under Mount Mao touches on the question of how intellectuals can exert their personal agency within revolutionary wars, reflecting a deepening toward realism. The main weakness of his writing lies in a certain lack of maturity in his verbal expression and narrative pacing.

From the very beginning of his career, Qiu Dongping attracted the attention of the literary world and later scholars. As early as the 1930s, Guo Moruo affirmed that Qiu had "an extraordinary breadth of ambition and an exceptionally thick poetic temperament." Hu Feng commented that Qiu Dongping was "the one who understood the ideological demands of revolutionary literature most profoundly, and the one whose achievements were greatest." Nie Gannu praised him as a "dominant talent" in the literary arena. After the founding of the People's Republic of China, the Hu Feng Counter-Revolutionary Clique Case also implicated Qiu Dongping as an important member of the July faction. For a considerable period, mainland Chinese academic circles paid little attention to Qiu, and what attention there was largely critical. Only after the Reform and Opening‑up and the rehabilitation of Hu Feng was Qiu's place in literary history reaffirmed.

=== Major works ===
During his lifetime, Qiu Dongping published a succession of collections. At the time of his death, his novel Under Mount Mao remained unfinished. After the War of Resistance ended, the novel was formally published in October 1945 in Huaiyin with the help of Peng Baishan. After the founding of the PRC, the Shanghai New Literature and Art Publishing House brought out Selected Works of Dongping in 1953. Thereafter, Qiu's works were gradually collected and republished. His major works include:

- Short‑story collection The Melancholy City of Meileng
  - "The Melancholy City of Meileng", "Malacca and the Priest", "The Story of Ten Pistols"
- Short‑story collection General's Stories
  - "A Scene at the Transfer Post", "Correct", "The General's Story", "Noble Behavior", "Tan Gen's Father", "Rabbits", "The Death of General Ma Lan", "The Prophet's Prophecy", "The Appearance of a New Don Quixote", "The King and Bodyguard in Exile"
- Short‑story collection The Battle of Longxia City
  - "A Garrulous Sai'e", "A Child's Upbringing", "The Defense of Honghua Ground", "The Dispatch Rider", "Lieutenant Colonel Adjutant", "Mules", "The Philanthropist", "Between Friends", "The Rider of the White Horse", "The Battle of Longxia City"
- Novella The Fire
- Fiction collection The Giver
  - "The Will to Resist", "The Giver"
- Documentary collection The Seventh Company
  - "The Seventh Company", "Where We Were Defeated", "I Have Known Such an Enemy", "A Day of Storm", "A Company Commander's Battle Experience", "Impressions of Ye Ting", "Wu Lüxun and Master Jizi"
- Documentary collection Marching into the Enemy's Rear
  - "Marching into the Enemy's Rear", "Armed Political Work Teams", "Interception", "Ranks of Those Who Propagate the 'Imperial Way'", "Mother", "Dongwan: The Destruction of a Japanese Stronghold", "Stories from Under the Iron Heel", "With Tenacity in Battle"
- Novel Under Mount Mao
  - Besides the unfinished novel, it also includes six documentary pieces: "Seizing the Type 38 Rifle", "The Little Battle at Wanglinggang", "Escape from the Die-Hards' Clutches", "The Battalion Commander of a Friendly Force", "Two Young Men from Jingjiang", "A Story from the Liyang-Wuhan Road"

== Family ==
Qiu Dongping's father was Qiu Jincheng (also known as Zhongjin or Xiaotang, 1871–1948) and his mother was Huang Qiao (1881–1970). He had eight brothers and two sisters, and was the sixth child in the family. His fifth brother, Qiu Daoren, had taken part with Qiu Dongping in the Hailufeng Uprising, but died around 1934 in Xiamen, leaving behind his wife, Wu Xiao. In early spring 1935, Qiu Dongping married Wu Xiao in Hong Kong; the couple had a daughter, Qiu Liqing. After the outbreak of the War of Resistance, Qiu headed to the front lines and gradually lost contact with Wu Xiao. In November 1939, in a letter to Hu Feng, Qiu mentioned that he had a new girlfriend, Xin Wen. Xin Wen was from Guangxi and had served in the Guangxi Student Corps; she later worked as a reporter for the Jianghuai Daily. At the end of 1940 or the beginning of 1941, Qiu Dongping and Xin Wen married in Yancheng. After Qiu's death, Xin Wen changed her name to Xiping as a token of remembrance. Wu Xiao, for her part, was classified as a landlord during the Land Reform in the early 1950s; unable to bear the torment, she hanged herself.

== See also ==
- July faction
- Zhang Henshui
