= Little Long March =

Part of the Chinese Civil War in 1927

The Little Long March was a 600-kilometre (370 mi), two-month withdrawal by left-wing members of the Kuomintang and the National Revolutionary Army up the Gan River and down to the coast, subsequent to the successful mutiny and insurrection at Nanchang on August 1, 1927.

== Withdrawal of liberated troops ==
Facing a counter-attack from Right-Kuomintang (Chiang Kai-shek-affiliated Nationalists) regiments moving up from Jiujiang, the Revolutionary Committee—basically Zhou Enlai, Li Lisan and their Comintern military advisor Kunanin—decided to evacuate the city and make for the southern port of Shantou, Guangdong, in the hope of receiving a Soviet arms shipment. Once supplied they would attempt a return to the provincial capital Guangzhou and thence a new and proper dissemination of Left-Kuomintang/Communist influence throughout the province from which most of the insurrection's soldiery had come. He Long strongly opposed this idea: he pointed out that marching such a great distance and over such terrain in the heat of summer would put a severe strain on the troops. He also pointed out that the popular support for the communists in Guangdong was merely a fraction of what they enjoyed among the peasantry in Hunan, the province where he had thrived by brigandage since 1913. Resupply and local enlistment were assured. Why should the new base not be established somewhere in its vast border regions?

He Long's suggestion was vetoed—Guangzhou, springboard of the Northern Expedition, was the target set by the Comintern. Accordingly, on August 5 the 25,000 Left-Kuomintang troops began the 600 km march to the South China Sea coast. The Communists would pay a hefty price for their obeisance two months later in the rout known as the Battle of Shantou.

By the 8th, only three days out, a third of the Uprising troops had deserted. On the 19th, the column entered Ruijin. Reconnaissance had found Right-Kuomintang forces at Huichang, the next county town to the south. On the following morning the Battle of Huichang pitted brother officers, graduates of the Huangpu (Whampoa) Military Academy, against one another in close combat. Ye Ting's 11th Army arrived late and He Long's 20th bore the brunt. The Nanchang Mutineers took nearly a thousand casualties, half of them dead. The Right-Kuomintang evacuated the town under cover of night. The Left would not pursue them; their route lay east, over the divide into Fujian.

In the aftermath of battle, He Long swore allegiance to the Chinese Communist Party, witnessed by Zhou Enlai, Li Lisan and Zhang Guotao. At the other end of Asia, Pravda hailed the advent of a new, partisan, Workers' and Peasants' Red Army. For Joseph Stalin this was ample proof that the Comintern's line was correct, and Leon Trotsky thus incorrect to question it.

== Down the Tingjiang ==
Having rested at the headwaters of the Gan River, the Liberated troops filed over into Changting Prefecture. The best combat troops formed the vanguard, they were soon 20 miles and two days' march ahead of the rear. Most of the leaders of the revolutionary committee and Nanchang civilian sympathisers were in the main section. The rearguard, 200 troops under Li Lisan, had the wounded and the baggage and veteran peasant activist Peng Pai; it is said that 1000 women of the area, some widowed, perhaps by war, joined them as carriers.

At the prefectural centre in early September, Li commandeered 100 boats each with her crew of four to take the wounded and weak down the Tingjiang river to Shanghang county; not letting the crews sort themselves out resulted in costly accidents. The Chaozhou-Shantou area, their destination, and the hope of Soviet reinforcement, lay much further downstream.

In the meantime, other Left-KMT troops had convened at Wenjiashi, on Jiangxi's western border, ostensibly for a similar uprising (Autumn Harvest Uprising), this to seize Changsha for the Wuhan government. The troops instead found themselves commandeered by Mao Zedong and marched south up into the Jinggang mountains.

By the end of September, with their Nanchang troops poised above Shantou, the Communists knew that their uprisings had yet to take and keep one city from the Rightists. The Chiang-affiliated KMT or warlord forces were even now moving in to trap the Left Mutineers with the sea at their backs. The Comintern's Hong Kong station sent word that they should avoid further battles, forgo Shantou port (where in any event Soviet arms would not be forthcoming) and take cover like the Wenjiashi troops, and furthermore establish a rural soviet in Peng's hometown. There was now, however, no avoiding the Rightist hammer: Ye and He lost two-fifths of their troop strength in battle at Fengshun County-town. In belated accordance with the Comintern directive, Ye circled down to Shanwei, lending peasant leader Peng a triumphant return to his home town Haifeng.

== Aftermath ==
Zhu De, who had commanded the northern front during the battle, marched his 1,000 troops back into Jiangxi and over its western ridges into Hunan. There, he found refuge for his mutineer regiment with the warlord of Yizhang County, though he and fellow communist Chen Yi considered it best to live incognito while in the area.

By April 1928, Zhu's force had expanded to 10,000, and he marched them into the Jinggang Mountains along the borderlands, where they joined the survivors of Mao's uprising.

=== Exile and reorganization in Hong Kong ===
Other surviving members were much less fortunate; all became fugitives. Zhou Enlai, seriously ill and carrying nothing more than a pistol or two, cut off from outside communication and accompanied only by Ye Jianying (and possibly Ye Ting), and later joined by Nie Rongzhen, made it to Hong Kong, the largest and safest of China’s foreign concessions.

Zhang Guotao and Li Lisan initially sought refuge in the small fishing port of Tiazugang before also traveling to Hong Kong. There they were instructed to write reports on the Nanchang Uprising—with Li’s report serving in part to assign him responsibility for the failed operation. Disguised as businessmen, they traveled by passenger liner to Shanghai, where they were housed in a safehouse on Chongqing Road. Ultimately, both Zhang and Li, along with Zhou Enlai, were expelled from the Politburo.

=== Other participants ===
He Long returned to his hometown after the defeat. Once an army commander responsible for tens of thousands of men, he was reduced to poverty and received little support from his family, apart from a few members already sympathetic to communism. He later raised another force of about 3,000 soldiers in his home region, but it too was destroyed by the right-wing Kuomintang, leaving just over 30 survivors. Within a year, however, He Long had again become the commander of a significant force.

Other participants who fled the rout at Fengshun included Liu Bocheng, who received support from communist sympathizers and was eventually sent to Moscow for military training; Lin Biao, who for a time lost contact but eventually rejoined the remnants of the uprising while fleeing local hostility; and Guo Moruo, who went into exile in Japan.

== See also ==
- Outline of the Chinese Civil War
