= Wu Tiao Ren =

Chinese folk rock band (formed 2009)

Wu Tiao Ren 五条人
- Wu Tiao Ren performing in Guangzhou in 2024

Background information
- Origin: Haifeng, Guangdong, China
- Genres: Chinese folk; alternative folk; folk rock; indie rock
- Years active: 2009-present
- Labels: Demodance; Modern Sky

Wu Tiao Ren (Chinese: 五条人; pinyin: Wǔtiáorén) is a Chinese folk rock band from Haifeng, Guangdong. They sing in the Haifeng dialect, along with Mandarin.

== History ==
=== Formation (2004-2008) ===
Wu Tiao Ren was formed in March 2009 by Amao (a.k.a. Maotao) and Renke, both from Haifeng. Amao moved to Guangzhou from Haifeng in 2001 after failing in the Gaokao. He made a living by selling dakou CDs, which are discarded cut-out copies that were imported into China as garbage. Renke, at the time, was an art student studying painting in Haifeng. The two met when Renke, then 17, performed at a local music festival in Haifeng that Amao helped organize during the Chinese New Year of 2004. Renke later moved in with Amao to Shipai Village, an urban village in Guangzhou, where they sold bootleg books on the street. In 2007, in preparation for the 2010 Asian Games, Guangzhou officials cracked down on street vendors. The duo then rented a store front and opened up a record store, where they also started writing music. They opened for folk singer Zhou Yunpeng in 2008.

=== A Tale of Haifeng and Some Other Scenery (2009-2014) ===
In 2009, with the help of friends, they recorded their debut album A Tale of Haifeng. A Tale of Haifeng is largely sung in Haifeng dialect. The lyrics references the provincial life in the county town of Haifeng, one of the poorest places in Guangdong, with major themes around the urban-rural divide, China's rapid economic development and its real estate bubble, and life struggles. It received critical acclaim. At the 2010 Chinese Music Awards, the band won Best New Musical Group, and single 十年水流东，十年水流西 from the album won Best Dialect Song.

The band sings about small-town outcasts in China—an old bachelor who likes to watch factory girls going to work, a person riding a bicycle while walking a pig, a black market vendor of foreign currencies, and a young Haifeng native revolutionary who was executed by Chiang Kai-shek in 1929. (Note: Referring to Peng Pai.) Traditional local opera and fishermen’s songs inform their singing styles. Their albums also include field recordings of the bus horns and scooter engine noises on the streets of Haifeng and reenactments of their neighbors’ quarrels.

— Yunfan Sun, ChinaFile

Their second album, Some Other Scenery, was released in 2012. It incorporated more rock elements, while retaining the grassroot themes and gritty but playful aesthetics. It references social and political issues, including the 2011 Wukan protests which occurred in a town nearby. It won the band Best Musical Group and Best Folk Artist at the 2013 Chinese Music Media Awards.

=== Signing to Modern Sky, Canton Girl, Dreamy Lisa Salon, and Gushi Hui (2015-2019) ===
After signing onto China's largest independent record label Modern Sky, they released their third album, Canton Girl, in 2015, and their fourth album, Dreamy Lisa Salon, in 2016. Both albums featured more songs in Mandarin. The former was nominated for Best Mandarin Album at the 2016 Chinese Music Awards with the band nominated for Best Folk Artist. The latter was their first album to received a mixed review, with critics praising the musical composition while criticizing the departure from their signature straightforward lyrics and folk aesthetics. The band has stated that the switch to Mandarin, the prestige language, is a reflection of their internal identity struggles and tensions between their rural poverty past and urban middle class present. They also stated that their choice of language is determined by the theme and topic of the material, and they do not wish to be seen as using their dialect as a gimmick.

Their fifth album, Gushi Hui, was released in 2018. Its name (transl. Story Collections) refers to the Chinese literary magazine of the same name.

=== Domestic profile and recent activities (2020–present) ===
In 2020, the band appeared on season 2 of the iQiYi music reality competition show The Big Band. One of their performances went viral on Chinese internet, when they changed from their planned Mandarin hit song to instead perform a gritty and "provocative song about a kid who is languishing in jail", sung in the Haifeng dialect. They finished as one of the show's finalists.

== Lineup ==
The band's permanent members are its two founders.

- Renke (born 1986) (voice, electric guitar, accordion)
- Amao (born 1981) (voice, acoustic guitar)

== Discography ==
=== Albums ===
- A Tale of Haifeng (县城记), 2009
- Some Other Scenery (一些风景), 2012
- Canton Girl (广东姑娘), 2015
- Dreamy Lisa Salon (梦幻丽莎发廊), 2016
- Gushi Hui (故事会)，2019
- Half True, Half False (一半真情流露，一半靠表演), 2021
- Live Fish Swim Upstream, Dead Fish Drift Downstream (活鱼逆流而上，死鱼随波逐流), 2021
- Earth's Love Song (地球恋曲), 2025
