= Battle of Shantou (1927) =

Rout of the Nanchang Uprising mutineers by superior Right-Kuomintang forces

Coordinates: 23.759°N 116.182°E

The Battle of Shantou (a treaty port long romanised as Swatow) occurred in September–October 1927 during the first phase of the Chinese Civil War in China.

== Battle ==
=== Time and place ===
From the morning of September 30 to the evening of October 1, 1927, around Tangkeng Town in the Meizhou-Chaozhou border hills.

=== Opponents ===
A Guangdong warlord force of 15,000 troops allied with the emergent Right-Kuomintang under Chiang Kai-shek, well-entrenched and supplied blocking the march of the Nanchang mutineers, led by Communist International (Comintern) advisors and Chinese Communist Party (CCP) members, toward the resupply of Shantou by a Soviet ship with the ultimate aim of seizing Guangzhou for the emergent Left-Kuomintang government then established in Hankou, Hubei.

After the rigours of the two-month Little Long March, there were only 5,000 troops available for this Comintern mission. Ye Ting and He Long had most of the force. Zhu De's section was charged with protecting the march's north flank.

CCP founding member Zhang Tailei arrived from Hong Kong with a new Comintern directive: there would be no arms shipment coming into Shantou. The troops were to avoid combat and retreat into the hills south and west of that port, there to proclaim the Haifeng Soviet.

=== Outcome ===
Left-KMT troops saw 40% of their number killed in action during the two days' of fighting. Ye Ting took his surviving troops to Haifeng where they enforced the return to local power of Peng Pai. He Long had no men at his disposal and barely escaped; Zhu De led his survivors northwest into Hunan, He Long's old bandit-ground.

With Right-KMT-allied warlord troops closing in, CCP leaders Zhou, Li and Zhang slipped out of the now-hopeless Shantou port area and eventually returned to Shanghai, the latter two by way of Hong Kong.

== See also ==
- Outline of the Chinese Civil War
- Swatow Operation

== Bibliography ==
- Lescot, Patrick (2005). Before Mao: The Untold Story of Li Lisan and the Creation of Communist China. HarperCollins. ISBN 9780060084653.
