= List of Major National Historical and Cultural Sites in Guangdong =

This list is of Major Sites Protected for their Historical and Cultural Value at the National Level in the Province of Guangdong, People's Republic of China.

Site	Chinese name	Location	Designation	Image
Site of the Quell the British Corps at Sanyuanli	Sanyuanli pingyingtuan yizhi 三元里平英团遗址	Guangzhou	1-1	Upload file
Tombs of the Seventy-Two Revolutionary Martyrs in Huanghuagang	Huanghuagang qishi'er lieshi mu 黄花岗七十二烈士墓	Guangzhou	1-6	Upload file
Peasant Movement Training Institute	Guangzhou nongmin yundong jiangxisuo jiuzhi 广州农民运动讲习所旧址	Guangzhou	1-12	Upload file
Red Palace and Red Square	Haifeng honggong 海丰红宫, Hongchang jiuzhi 红场旧址	Haifeng County	1-15	Upload file
Site of the Canton Commune	Guangzhou gongshe jiuzhi 广州公社旧址	Guangzhou	1-16	Upload file
Guangxiao Temple	Guangxiao si 光孝寺	23°07′56″N 113°15′04″E Guangzhou	1-83	Upload file
Site of Lin Zexu's Opium Destruction and the Humen Batteries	Lin Zexu xiaoyanchi yu Humen paotai jiuzhi 林则徐销烟池与虎门炮台旧址	Dongguan	2-1	Upload file
Former Residence of Hong Xiuquan	Hong Xiuquan guju 洪秀全故居	Guangzhou	3-1	Upload file
Former Residence of Sun Yat-sen	Sun Zhongshan guju 孙中山故居	Zhongshan	3-11	Upload file
Site of the First National Congress of the Kuomintang	Minguodang "yida" jiuzhi 国民党“一大”旧址	Guangzhou	3-20	Upload file
Whampoa Military Academy	Huangpu junxiao jiuzhi 黄埔军校旧址	23°05′22″N 113°25′13″E Guangzhou	3-21	Upload file
Former Headquarters of the All Chinese Federation of Workers Unions	Zhonghua quanguo zonggonghui jiuzhi 中华全国总工会旧址	Guangzhou	3-22	Upload file
Guangji Bridge	Guangji qiao 广济桥	23°39′55″N 116°39′05″E Chaozhou	3-69	Upload file
Chen Clan Ancestral Hall	Chen jia citang 陈家祠堂	Guangzhou	3-85	Upload file
Pagoda of Yulong Temple	Yunlong si ta 云龙寺塔	Renhua County	3-138	Upload file
Sanying Tower	Sanying ta 三影塔	Nanxiong	3-144	Upload file
Sites of the Qin shipyard, Nanyue Kingdom Palace, and the Mausoleum of the Nanyue King Wen	Qindai zaochuan yizhi, Nanyueguo gong shu yizhi ji Nanyue Wen wang mu 秦代造船遗址、南越国宫署遗址及南越文王墓	Guangzhou	4-35	Upload file
Huaisheng Mosque	Huaishengsi guangta 怀圣寺光塔	23°07′31″N 113°15′13″E Guangzhou	4-85	Upload file
Mei'an Temple	Mei'an 梅庵	Zhaoqing	4-109	Upload file
Deqing Academy	Deqing xuegong 德庆学宫	Deqing County	4-124	Upload file
Xu Fuma Residence	Xu fuma fu 许驸马府	Chaozhou	4-151	Upload file
Foshan Ancestral Temple	Foshan zumiao 佛山祖庙	23°02′07″N 113°06′59″E Foshan	4-152	Upload file
Mantang Wei	Mantang wei 满堂围	Shixing County	4-180	Upload file
Leizu Temple	Leizu ci 雷祖祠	Leizhou	4-181	Upload file
Architecture of Shamian	Guangzhou Shamian jianzhu qun 广州沙面建筑群	Guangzhou	4-209	Upload file
Former Residence of Kang Youwei	Kang Youwei guju 康有为故居	Foshan	4-210	Upload file
Former Residence of Liang Qichao	Liang Qichao guju 梁启超故居	Guangzhou	4-211	Upload file
Sacred Heart Cathedral of Guangzhou	Guangzhou Shengxin dajiao tang 广州圣心大教堂	Guangzhou	4-215	Upload file
Naozhou Lighthouse	Naozhou dengta 硇州灯塔	Zhanjiang	4-218	Upload file
Former Seat of the Leader of the Military Government in Guangzhou	Guangzhou dayuanshuai fu jiuzhi 广州大元帅府旧址	Guangzhou	4-232	Upload file
Shixia Site	Shixia yizhi 石峡遗址	Shaoguan	5-95	Upload file
Lianhuashan Quarry	Lianhua Shan (Panyu) 莲花山 (番禺)	Guangzhou	5-96	Upload file
Bijiashan Chaozhou Kiln Site	Bijia shan Chaozhou yao yizhi 笔架山潮州窑遗址	Chaozhou	5-97	Upload file
Dongguan Keyuan	Dongguan Keyuan 东莞可园	Dongguan	5-369	Upload file
Nanhua Temple	Nanhua si 南华寺	24°38′57″N 113°37′53″E Shaoguan	5-370	Upload file
Old Buildings of Donghuali	Donghuali gu jianzhu qun 东华里古建筑群	Foshan	5-371	Upload file
Yuanshan Temple	Yuanshan si 元山寺	Lufeng	5-372	Upload file
Dapeng Fort	Dapeng suocheng 大鹏所城	Shenzhen	5-373	Upload file
Temple of the Mother Dragon in Yuecheng	Yuecheng Longmu zu miao 悦城龙母祖庙	Deqing County	5-374	Upload file
City Wall of Zhaoqing	Zhaoqing gu chengqiang 肇庆古城墙	Zhaoqing	5-375	Upload file
Kaiyuan Temple, Chaozhou	Chaozhou Kaiyuan si 潮州开元寺	Chaozhou	5-376	Upload file
Yilue Huang Gong Ancestral Temple	Yilüe Huang gong ci 已略黄公祠	Chaozhou	5-377	Upload file
Stone inscriptions of the Seven Star Crags	Qixing yan moya shike 七星岩摩崖石刻	Zhaoqing	5-461	Upload file
Sun Yat-sen Memorial Hall	Zhongshan jiniantang 中山纪念堂	23°08′06″N 113°15′54″E Guangzhou	5-500	Upload file
Yuyin Garden	Yuyin shanfang 余荫山房	Guangzhou	5-501	Upload file
Kaiping Diaolou	Kaiping diaolou 开平碉楼	22°17′10″N 112°33′58″E Kaiping	5-502	Upload file
Birthplace of Ye Jianying	Ye Jianying guju 叶剑英故居	Mei County	5-503	Upload file
Nanfeng Kiln	Nanfeng guzao 南风古灶	Foshan	5-516	Upload file
Baojingwan Site	Baojingwan yizhi 宝镜湾遗址	Zhuhai	6-168	Upload file
Southern Han Mausoleums	Nan Han er ling 南汉二陵	Guangzhou	6-271	Upload file
Huiguang Pagoda	Huiguang ta 慧光塔	Lianzhou	6-679	Upload file
Guifeng Pagoda	Guifeng ta 龟峰塔	Heyuan	6-680	Upload file
Pagoda of the Temple of the Six Banyan Trees	Liurong si ta 六榕寺塔	Guangzhou	6-681	Upload file
Guangyu Temple	Guangyu ci 广裕祠	Conghua	6-682	Upload file
Old Buildings of Nanshe Village and Tangwei Village	Nanshecun he Tangweicun gu jianzhuqun 南社村和塘尾村古建筑群	Dongguan	6-683	Upload file
Han Wengong Temple	Han wengong ci 韩文公祠	Chaozhou	6-684	Upload file
Daoyunlou	Daoyunlou 道韵楼	Raoping County	6-685	Upload file
Cong Xigong Temple	Congxi gong ci 从熙公祠	Chao'an County	6-686	Upload file
Chen Fang Family Residence	Chen Fang jiazhai 陈芳家宅	Zhuhai	6-687	Upload file
Quejin Ting Stele	Quejin ting bei 却金亭碑	Dongguan	6-849	Upload file
Canton Customs House	Yuehaiguan jiuzhi 粤海关旧址	Guangzhou	6-1015	Upload file
Former Residence of Ye Ting	Ye Ting guju 叶挺故居	Huizhou	6-1016	Upload file
Former Residence of Qiu Fengjia	Qiu Fengjia guju 丘逢甲故居	Jiaoling County	6-1017	Upload file
Shuangfengzhai	Shuangfengzhai 双峰寨	Renhua County	6-1018	Upload file
Guangdong Provincial Assembly site	Guangdong ziyiju jiuzhi 广东咨议局旧址	Guangzhou	6-1019	Upload file
Dalingshan Base in the War of Resistance against the Japanese	Dalingshan kang-Ri genjudi jiuzhi 大岭山抗日根据地旧址	Dongguan	6-1020	Upload file

== See also ==
- Principles for the Conservation of Heritage Sites in China
