= Kaiyuan Temple (Chaozhou) =

Buddhist temple in Guangdong, China

- 开元寺
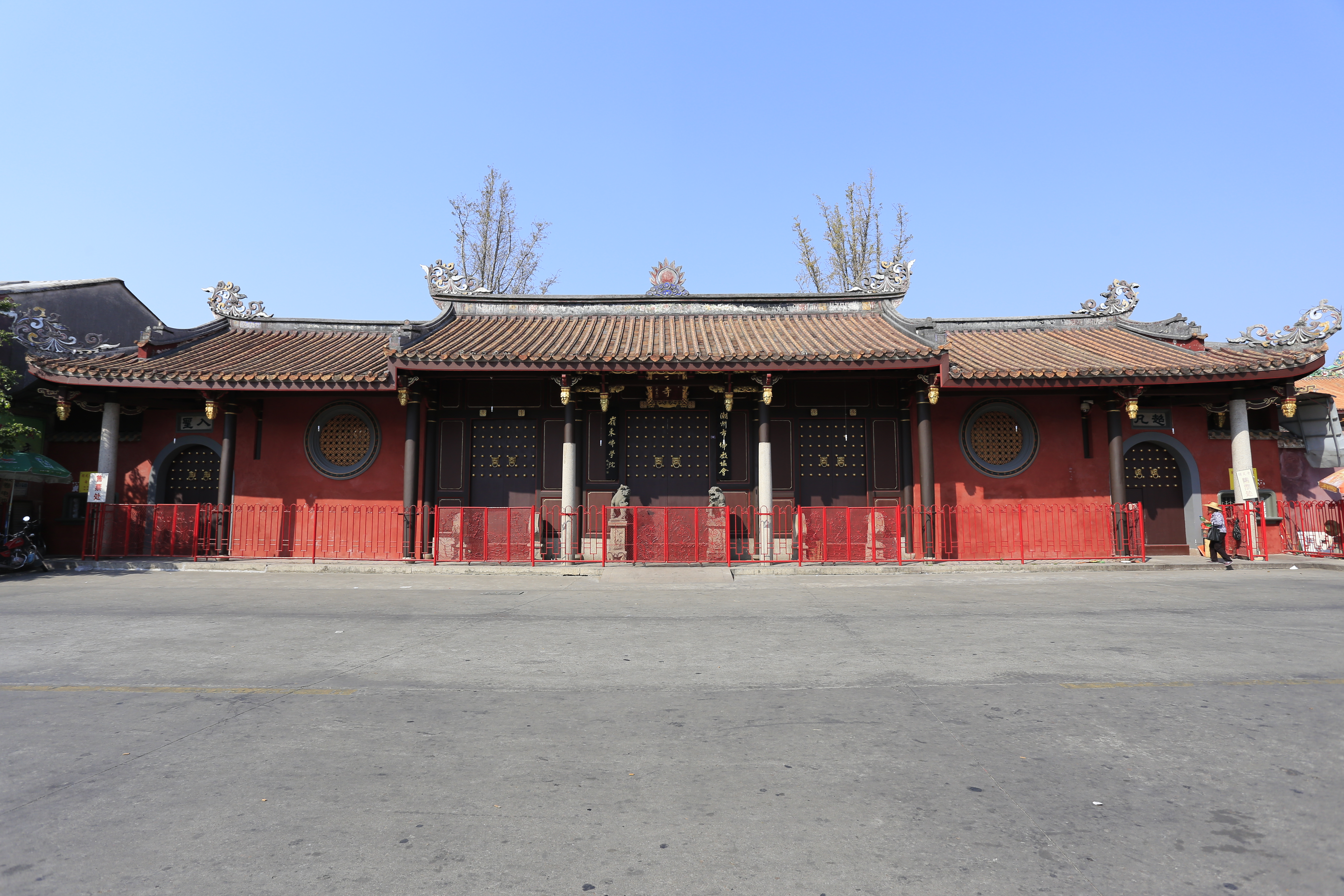
- The Shanmen at Kaiyuan Temple.

- Location within Guangdong Location within China

Religion
- Affiliation: Buddhism
- Sect: Linji school

Location
- Location: Xiangqiao District, Chaozhou, Guangdong
- Country: China
- Coordinates: 23°40′11″N 116°39′20″E

Architecture
- Style: Chinese architecture
- Founder: Emperor Xuanzong
- Established: 738

Kaiyuan Temple (simplified Chinese: 开元寺; traditional Chinese: 開元寺; pinyin: Kāiyuán Sì) is a Buddhist temple located in Xiangqiao District of Chaozhou, Guangdong, China.

After Emperor Xuanzong ascended the throne in 713, he issued an edict establishing Kaiyuan Temples, named after his reign title Kaiyuan (開元), in prefectures throughout the Tang Empire (618–907). Over the centuries, through the rise and fall of the Tang, Song, Yuan, Ming and Qing dynasties, many of the existing structures at Kaiyuan Temple have retained their original appearance. Several of these buildings are now recognized as national treasures.

== History ==
Kaiyuan temple was first established in 738, in the reign of Emperor Xuanzong of Tang dynasty (618–907) with the original name of "Lifeng Temple" (荔峰寺). The name was changed to "Kaiyuan Wanshou Chan Temple" (开元万寿禅寺) during the Yuan dynasty (1172–1638). And then it was renamed "Kaiyuan Zhenguo Chan Temple" (开元镇国禅寺) in the Ming dynasty (1368–1644). During the Qing dynasty (1644–1911), people usually called it "Kaiyuan Temple" (开元寺) which is still use now.

In 1950, Buddhist monk Chunxin (纯信) was elected as the new abbot of the temple. Under his leadership, the temple was refurbished and redecorated. In 1962, Kaiyuan Temple was categorized as a provincial level key cultural heritage by the Guangdong Provincial Government. During the ten years devastating Cultural Revolution, the resident monks were being to disrobe and return to secular life, the abbot died in countryside.

After the 3rd Plenary Session of the 11th Central Committee of the Chinese Communist Party, according to the national policy of free religious belief, Buddhist monk Huiyuan (慧原) was unanimously chosen as abbot of the temple. He headed the reconstruction project. The reconstruction of the project lasted six years. In 1983, Kaiyuan Temple was classified as a National Key Buddhist Temple in Han Chinese Area.

In 1991, Buddhist monk Dingran (定然) was elected as abbot. During his term in the position, Thai Chinese, Upasika Xie Huiru (谢慧如) donated property to establish a Thailand style Buddhist Hall known as "Taifo Hall" (开元寺泰佛殿 with a Buddha image of Maravijaya attitude enshrined in the hall.

On June 25, 2001, Kaiyuan Temple was listed among the fifth group of "Major National Historical and Cultural Sites in Guangdong" by the State Council of China.

== Architecture ==
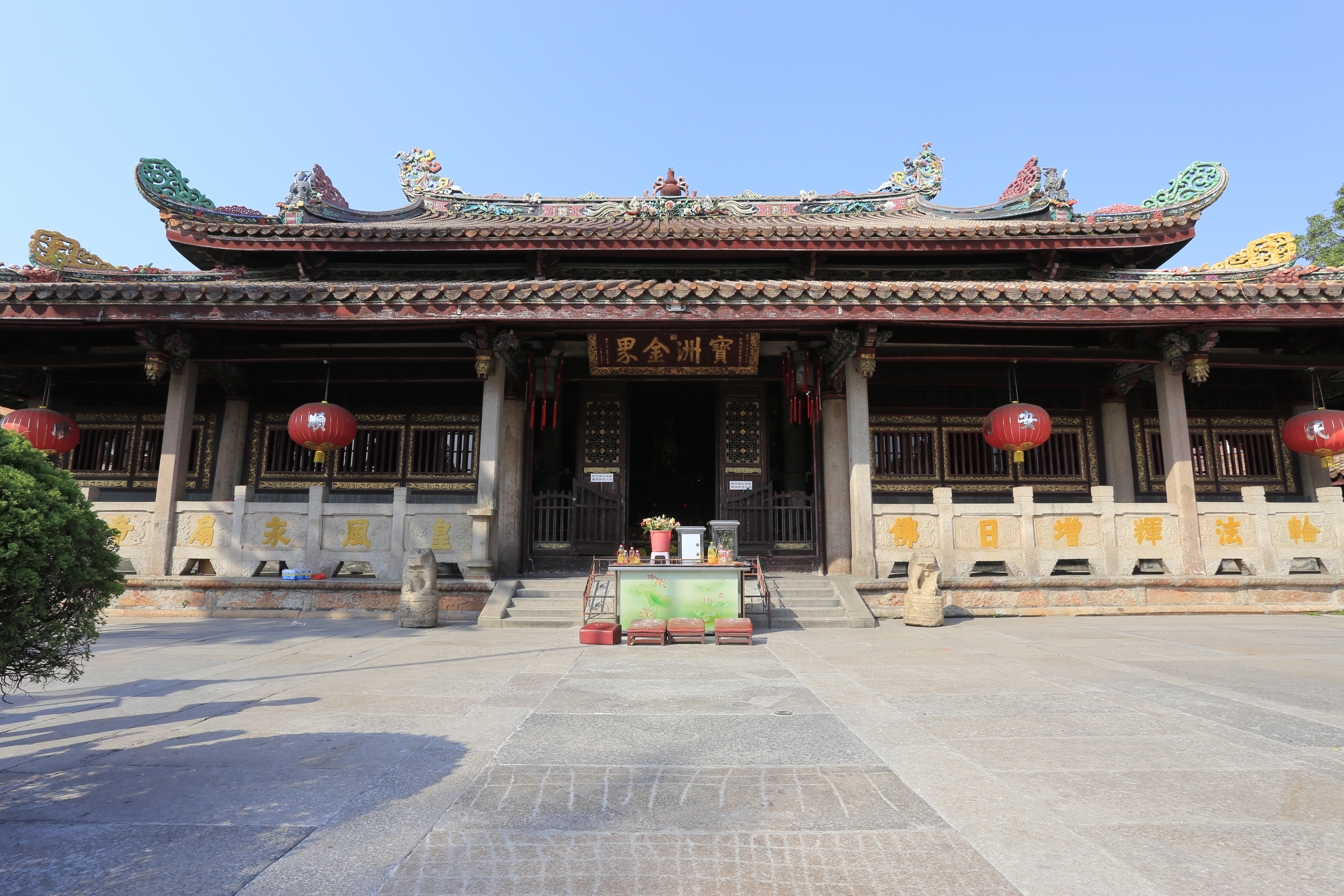
The Mahavira Hall at Kaiyuan Temple.

Along the central axis are the Shanmen, Four Heavenly Kings Hall, Mahavira Hall and Buddhist Texts Library. The other buildings include Dabei Hall, Taifo Hall, abbot's hall, dining hall, wing-rooms, etc.

=== Mahavira Hall ===
The Mahavira Hall enshrining the statues of Sakyamuni (middle), Amitabha (west) and Bhaisajyaguru (east). The statues of Eighteen Arhats stand on both sides of the hall.

=== Dabei Hall ===
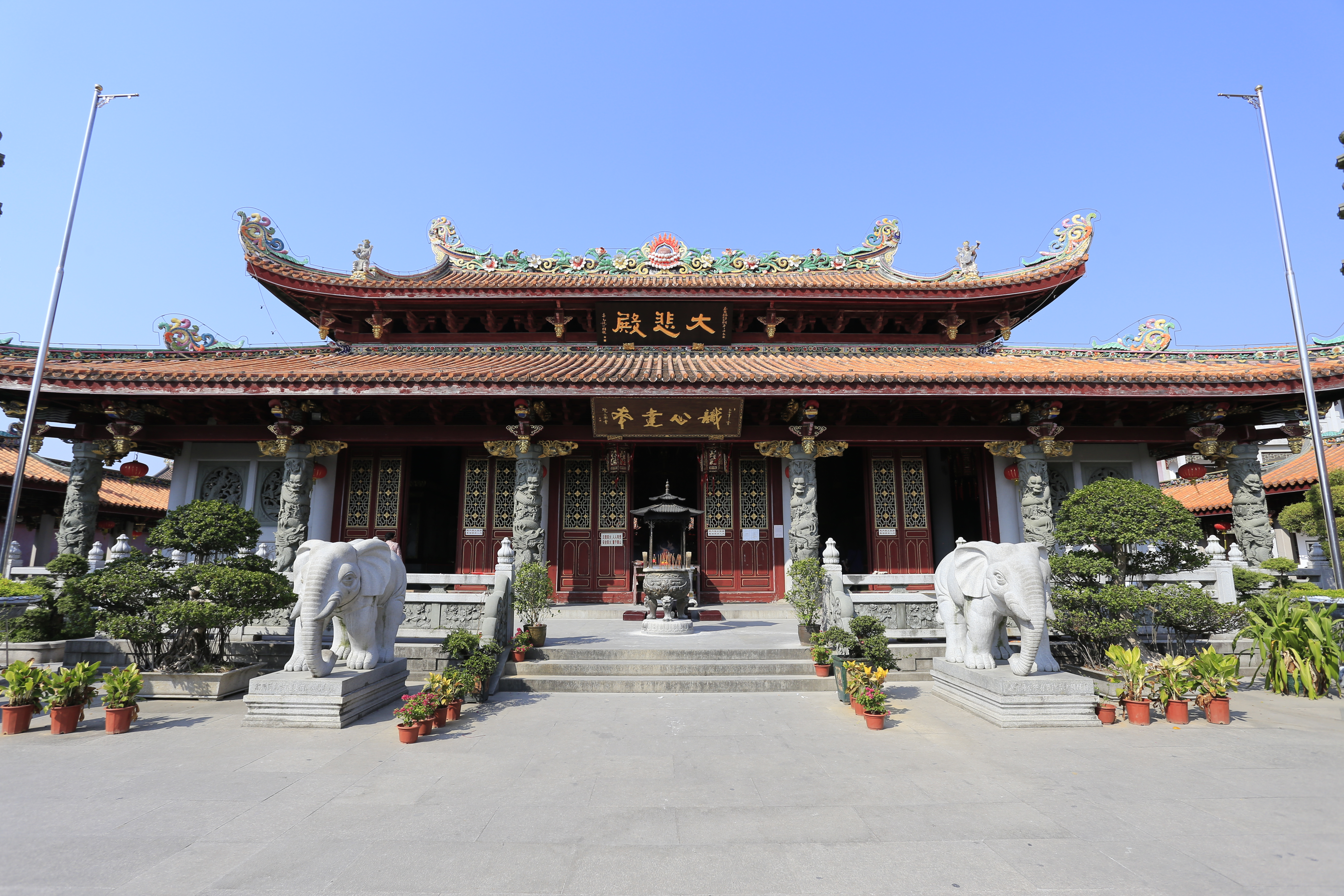
The Dabei Hall at Kaiyuan Temple.

The Babei Hall (大悲殿; 'Great Compassion Hall') was built in 2005. The construction took five years, and lasted from 2000 to 2005. It is 30 metres (98 ft) wide, 12.85 metres (42.2 ft) high with a depth of 25 metres (82 ft). The hall covers a building area of 1,600 square metres (17,000 sq ft) and the total area of 3,800 square metres (41,000 sq ft). Under the eaves is a plaque with the Chinese characters "Dabei Hall" written by Hong Kong sinologist Jao Tsung-I. A total of 86 statues of Guanyin are enshrined in the hall.

=== Taifo Hall ===
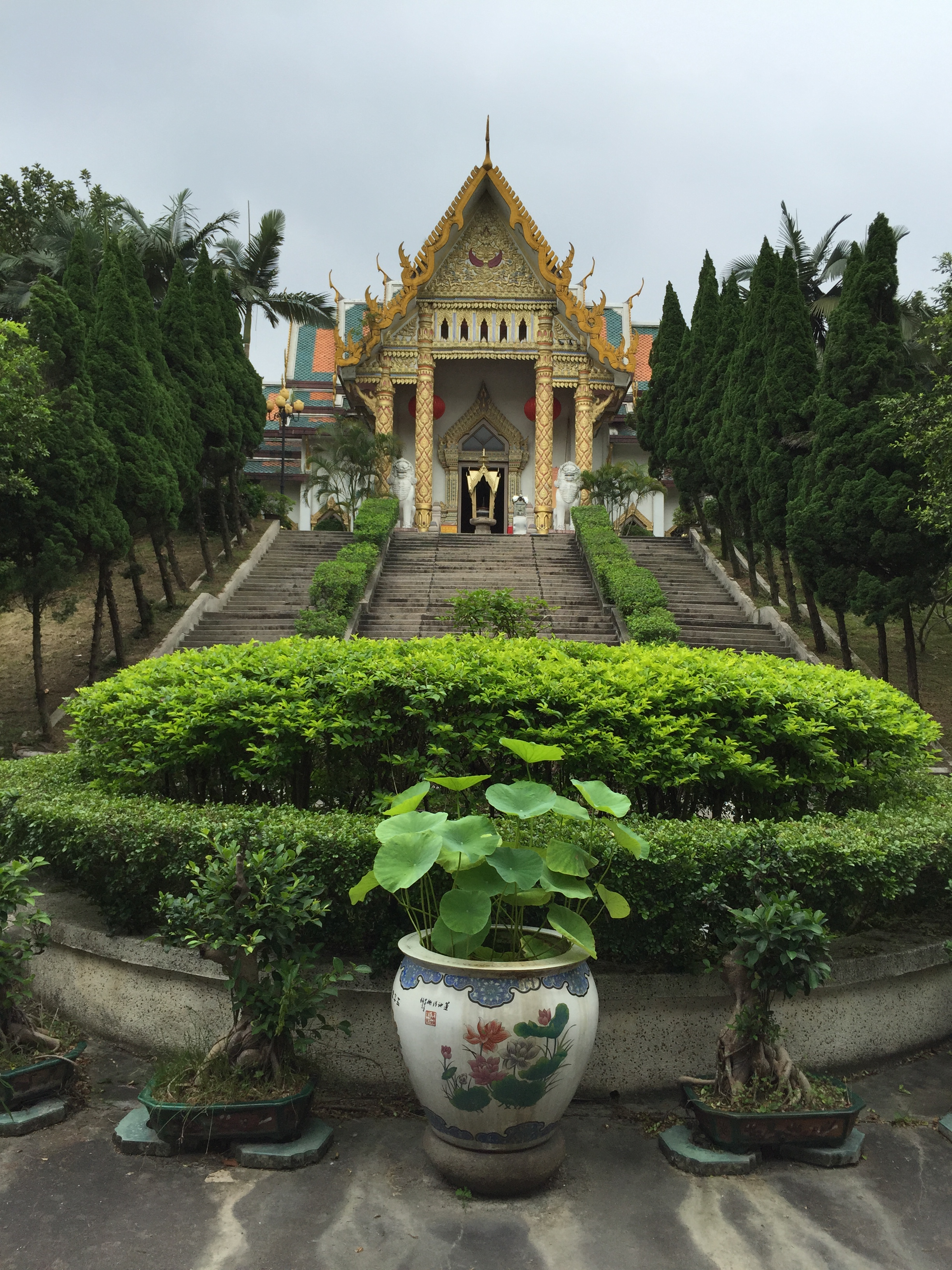
The Taifo Hall at Kaiyuan Temple.

A bronze statue of Gautama Buddha in Maravijaya attitude is enshrined in the Taifo Hall (泰佛殿; 'Thai Buddha Hall'). It is 3 metres (9.8 ft) high and weights 1,500 kilograms (3,300 lb). On the walls of the hall are painting with stories of Prince Siddhartha attaining Enlightenment in Thai artwork style. The statue of Phra Phrom (梵天), also known as "Four-faced Brahma" (四面佛), stands in the east side.

== National treasures ==
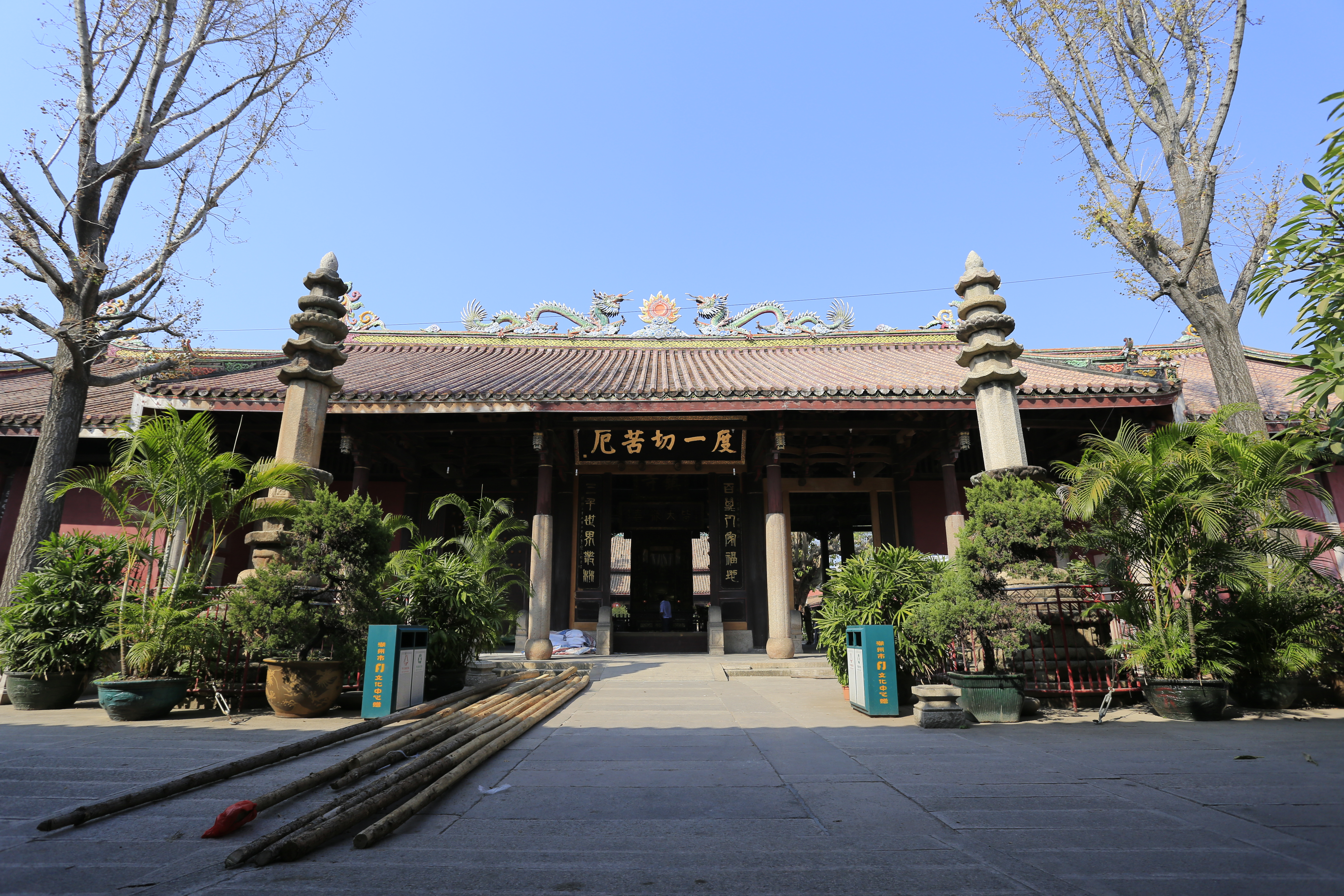
The Four Heavenly Kings Hall and the Tang dynasty stone pillars.

=== Thousand Buddha Pagoda ===
The seven-story, 2-metre-tall (6.6 ft), hexagonal-based Chinese pagoda is made of wood in the Ming dynasty (1368–1644). The Eighteen Arhats and Twenty-four Gods and Kings are carved on the body of the pagoda.

=== Bronze bell ===
The bronze bell which is 1.7 metres (5 ft 7 in) high and 1.05 metres (3 ft 5 in) in circumference is the symbol of Kaiyuan Temple, weighs more than 1,500 kilograms (3,300 lb). It was cast in 1114 in the reign of Emperor Huizong of Northern Song dynasty.

=== Stone pillars ===
Kaiyuan Temple houses four stone pillars (石经幢), they were made in the Tang dynasty (618–907). They are decorated with relief carvings of the Buddha, lotus petals, Hercules, Buddhist texts, and other designs.

=== Banisters ===
The banisters of the Mahavira Hall are carved with stories of Sakyamuni's becoming monk and other patterns, they were made in the Tang dynasty (618–907).

=== Incense burner ===
Inside the main hall stands an elegantly crafted red‑copper incense burner (紅銅香爐). Along its rim is an inscription in Chinese that reads: "One incense burner for the Chan Hall of Kaiyuan Temple, eternally dedicated by Ren Guozuo, disciple of the Three Han" (開元寺禪堂香爐一座永遠供奉三韓弟子任國祚). The term "Three Han" refers to the ancient Korean kingdoms of Silla (新羅), Baekje (百濟), and Goguryeo (高句麓), corresponding to present‑day South Korea and North Korea. According to tradition, this bronze incense burner was a gift from a Korean monk who came to the temple to study during the Tang dynasty.

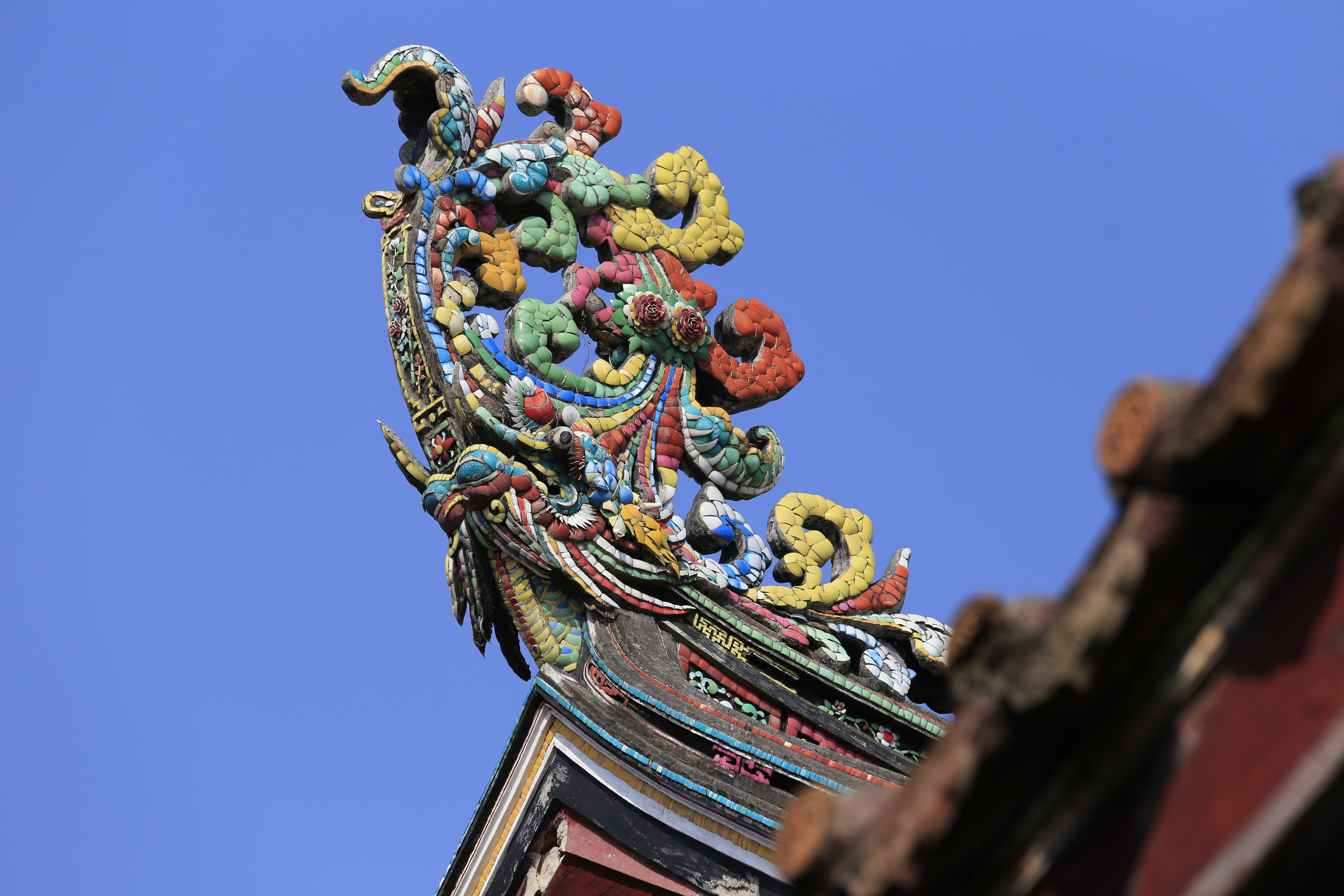
The Jishou (脊兽) of Mahavira Hall at Kaiyuan Temple.

=== Yunban ===
The Yunban (云板) in 1346, during the 6th year of Zhizheng period (1341–1370) of the Yuan dynasty (1271–1368).

=== Dragon-store Canon ===
A set of Dragon-store Buddhist Canon (《龙藏》) which printed in the Qianlong era (1376–1796) of the Qing dynasty (1644–1911) are preserved in Kaiyuan Temple. The Buddhist Canon was printed by imperial government and only 100 copies were produced at that time.
