= Red Palace and Red Square =

Historic place in Guangdong, China

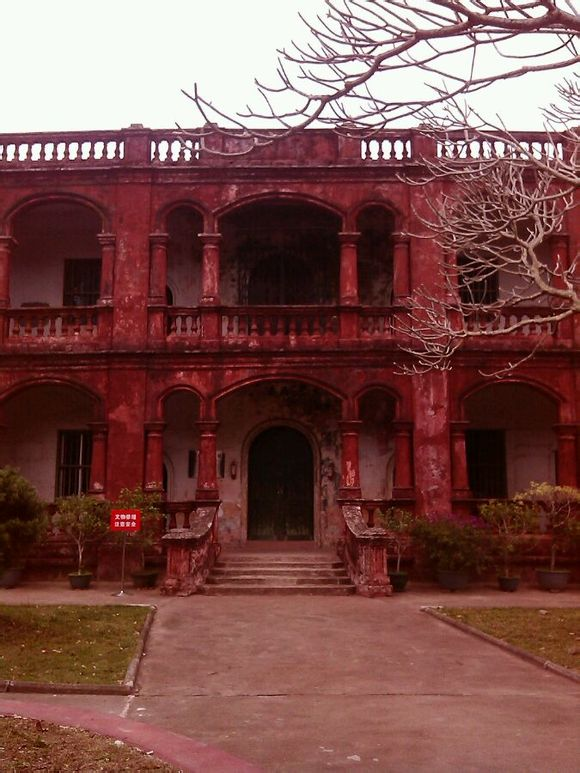
Red-Palace

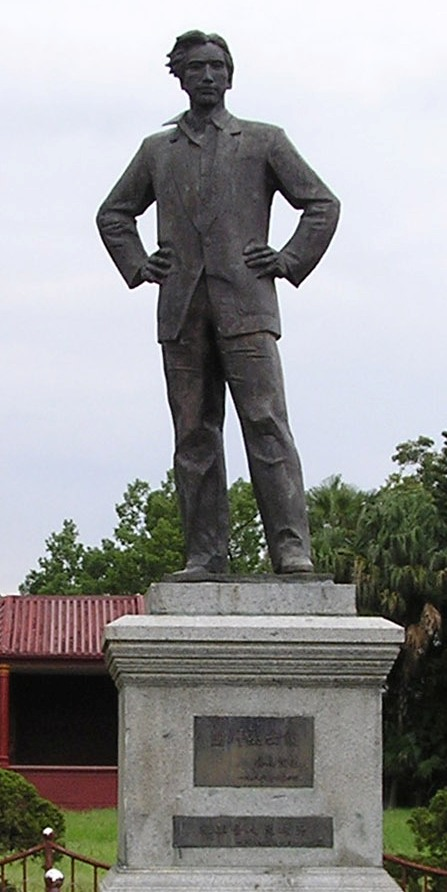
Peng Pai Statue in Red Square of Haifeng

Red Palace and Red Square is located in the middle of Renmin Road and also at the center of Haifeng downtown, Guangdong Province, China. In the Great Revolutionary Period of China, communists in Haifeng County and Lufeng County (now both under Shanwei Municipality) of Guangdong Province led by Peng Pai built up the Hai-Lu-Feng Soviet Worker-Peasant-Soldier Government, the very first soviet regime in China.

== Origin and name ==
The Red Palace and Red Square used to be an old-style school during the Ming dynasty. In 1927, between November 18 and 21, the Haifeng Soviet Congress of Worker-Peasant-Soldiers was held there. During this congress, the Haifeng Soviet Government was established. The congress also decided to brush walls around the palace with red paint and cover the indoor walls with red cloth, imitating the Red Palace in Moscow, Russia. Hence, the first Red regime was established. They also gave this old-style school a new name—Red Palace. After that, many important meetings were held in the Red Palace and the square to the east of it was named the Red Square. It was called “Dongcang Bu” (东仓埔) before that and covered an area of more than 22 square kilometers. After the establishment of the Chinese soviet regime, Peng Pai, the leader of the regime proposed the construction of a gate for the Red Square and a Platform for speeches. Then the gate and the platform were built. There is a golden five-pointed star and two Chinese characters—红场 (Red Square) embossed at the top of the gate and a couplet at both sides of the gate inscribed with “铲除封建势力，实行土地革命” (Wipe out the feudal forces, Carry out Agrarian Revolution). At the center of the square, a speech transmission station was set up for the convenience of rallies. On December 1, 1927, a rally with over 50,000 participants was held to celebrate the establishment of Haifeng Soviet Government. On Jan. 1st 1928, troops from Nanchang City after Nanchang Uprising led by Dong Lang (董朗) Yan Changxi (颜昌熙) met troops from Guangzhou City after Guangzhou Uprising in the square and successfully joined. In 1986, the bronze statue of Peng Pai was set in the Red Square 57 years after his sacrifice for revolution.

== History ==
The Red Palace used to be an old-style school during the Ming dynasty. It was built by Zheng Yuan, a county magistrate in 1329, the 12th year of Hongwu Year of Ming. The Red Square used to be the governmental granary during the Ming dynasty (1368–1644), and was called Dongcangfu at that time.

== Construction ==
=== Red Palace ===
The overall constructions in the Red Palace are typical Jiangnan (South regions of Yangtze River) style which shows an ancient style of grace and simplicity. All the walls, columns, door leaves, and door frames are all painted red. The main gate of the Red Palace consists of six columns and five arches. Inside of the gate, there lies a pond with an arch bridge upon. Go across the bridge and there lies the antechamber, the adytum, two side halls and the Dacheng Hall (the hall of great achievement). The Dacheng Hall is the major construction. Behind the Dacheng Hall lies the Wudai Ci (ancestral hall of many generations of ancestors). The hall used to be a place to worship Confucius. During the period of China's great revolution, it served as an accommodation for worker-peasant soldiers. It collapsed, though, but is now fully repaired according to its original appearance. Now, Wudai Ci serves as an exhibition hall exhibiting biographical relics and other materials of martyrs of uprising and revolutions in Hai-Lu Feng counties.

=== Red Square ===
Before the establishment of Haifeng Soviet Government, Peng Pai proposed the building of Red Square as a meeting place to announce the new government's establishment. It is said that this square was designed by Peng Pai himself but without evidence. On October 28, 1986, the 90th birthday of Peng Pai, a bronze statue of him was set at the center of the Red Square. The pedestal of it was made from granite. The size of the granite is: height: 2.3m, length: 2m, width: 1.7m. Words written by a Chinese marshal Xu Xiangqian “the Statue of Martyr Peng Pai” were curved in front of the pedestal. The statue is 3.2m tall and weighs 2000 kg. It was sculptured by sculptor Pan He from Guangzhou Academy of Fine Arts. In 1961, the State Council of People's Republic of China included the Red Palace and Red Square in the list of National Cultural Heritage Conservation.
