= Hailufeng Soviet =

Former Chinese Soviet territory

Haifeng-Lufeng Soviet 海陆丰苏维埃
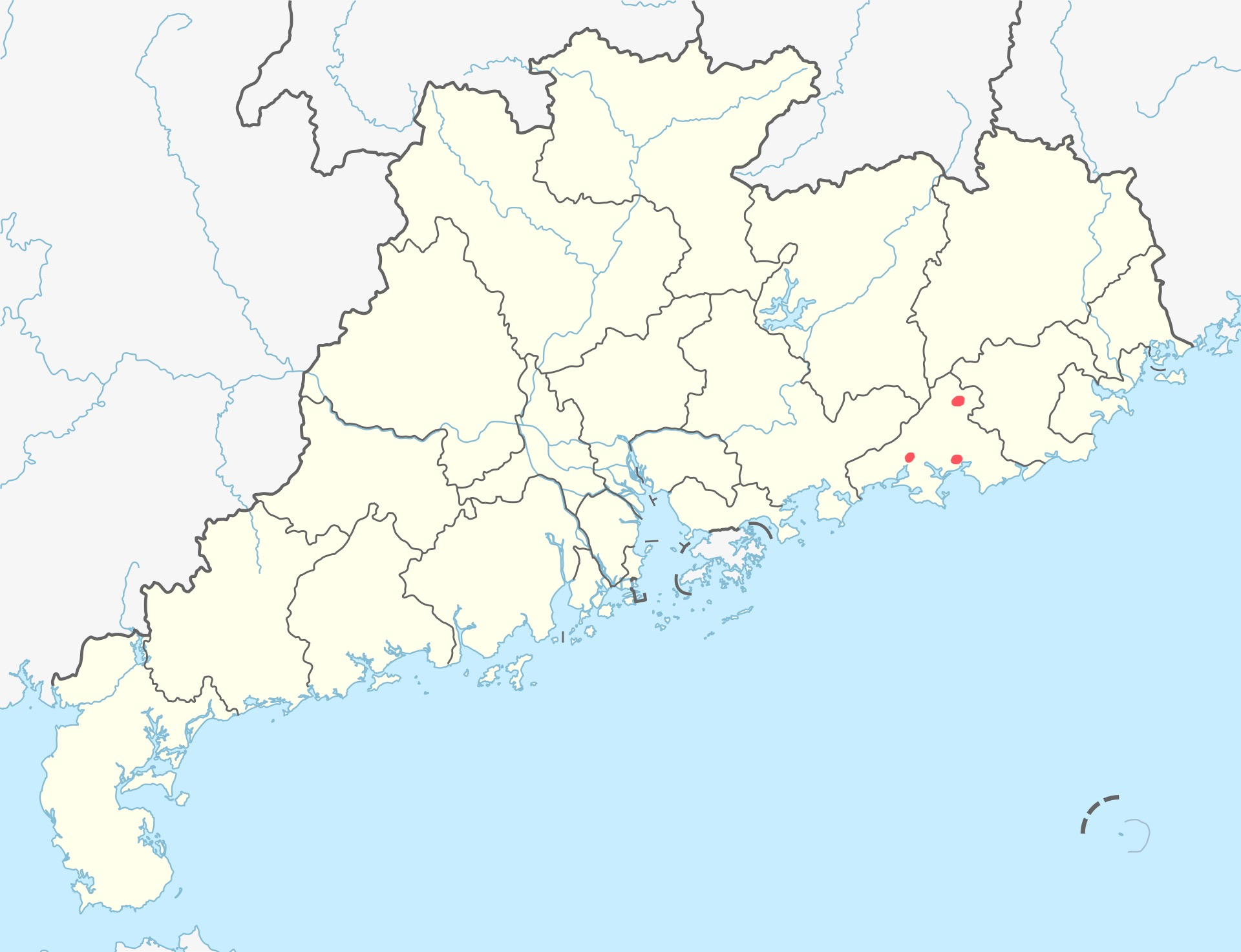

The Hailufeng Soviet (simplified Chinese: 海陆丰苏维埃; traditional Chinese: 海陸豐蘇維埃, i.e. Hai[feng]-Lufeng Soviet) was the first Chinese Soviet territory, established in November 1927, by Peng Pai with Ye Ting's remnant troops from the Nanchang Uprising. After the Little Long March and the near-rout at the Battle of Shantou these troops were much diminished and were directed by the Comintern to lie low in the deep countryside and to avoid any further battles.

== Location ==
The territory lay in mountainous Hakka speaking parts of Haifeng, Lufeng, and Luhe counties of what is now Shanwei municipality on the coast of Guangdong Province.

== See also ==
- Outline of the Chinese Civil War
- Chinese Soviet Republic
