= Hailufeng =

Hailufeng may refer to:

- Hailufeng, the region of Shanwei city of Guangdong, China
  - Hailufeng dialect, or Haklau Min, a variety of Southern Min, spoken in Shanwei, Haifeng and Lufeng in Guangdong, China
  - Hailufeng Hoklo people, a Southern-Min-speaking ethnic group native to the region of Hailufeng
  - Hailufeng Soviet, the first Chinese Soviet territory in 1927
