= Dakou =

Cut-out recordings to evade Chinese censorship

- Chinese: 打口
- Literal meaning: punched hole
Transcriptions
Standard Mandarin
- Hanyu Pinyin: dǎkǒu
- IPA: [tà.kʰòʊ]
Yue: Cantonese
- Jyutping: daa^{2} hau^{2}

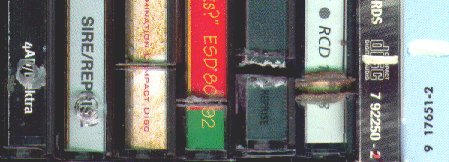
Eight examples of CDs that have an applicable use as a dakou

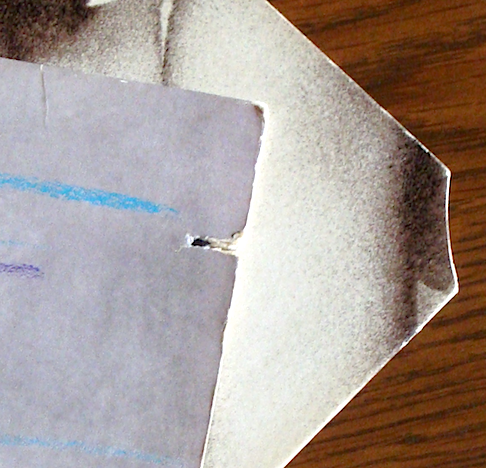
Cut-out records

In the recording industry, a dakou (Chinese: 打口) was a type of cut-out used in China to gain access to mostly rock music recordings that would otherwise be banned due to Chinese censorship.

These recordings, which were mainly shipped from the United States and Canada, were exported to China to be used as raw materials; however, they were instead sold through semi-legal markets to be listened to. Although they were cut, due to how tape recorders read the reels of tape loaded in a cassette from the centre to the margin, only the last parts of recordings were lost.

== Influence ==
The dakou allowed the Chinese youth to access Western rock music recordings, which led to musical inspiration from this type of music.

=== Dakou generation ===
The emergence of this generation in China during the 1990s can be seen as a result of social and cultural changes. The generation that emerged after the Cultural Revolution was raised in an era characterised by stability and prosperity, which influenced a more relaxed outlook on popular culture. Rock music played a role in their identity politics as it influenced their beliefs and values. The evolution of rock music in China has seen a shift from its initial portrayal of rebellion to a more nuanced perspective within the context of communism. Scholars have studied the production of rock music in China, analysing its connection to the global influence of Western rock and the diverse music scenes in different regions of China.

The influence of the Dakou Generation was observed in various rock music genres, including underground bands, heavy metal, punk, hip-hop, folk-rock, pop-rock, and fashionable bands. The genres and their performers played a role in the evolution and alteration of rock music in China, reflecting the changing cultural scenery of the nation.
