= Nanchang Uprising =

1927 event of the Chinese Civil War

- Part of the Chinese Civil War
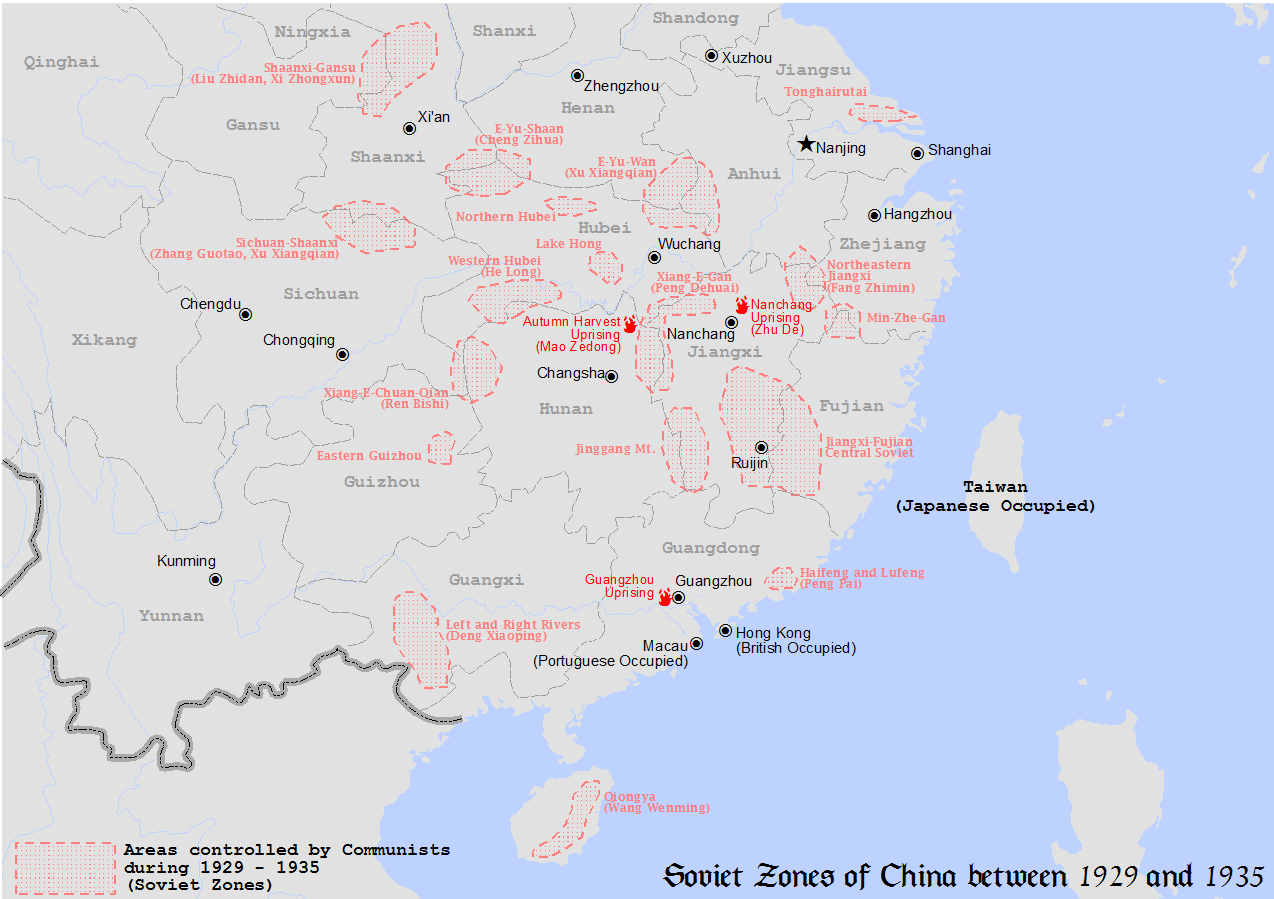
- Location of the Nanchang uprising
Date	1 August 1927
Location	Nanchang
Result	Nationalist tactical victory: Beginning of the Chinese Civil War

Belligerents
Nationalist government; Right-wing of the Kuomintang; Right-wing of the National Revolutionary Army	Communist Party; Left-wing of the Kuomintang; Left-wing of the National Revolutionary Army

Commanders and leaders
Zhu Peide; Chen Jitang; Zhang Fakui	He Long; Zhou Enlai; Zhu De; Ye Ting; Liu Bocheng; Deng Yanda; Song Qingling

Casualties and losses
1800 Killed	3500 killed

Nanchang Uprising
- Traditional Chinese: 南昌起義
- Simplified Chinese: 南昌起义
Transcriptions
Standard Mandarin
- Hanyu Pinyin: Nánchāng Qǐyì
- Wade–Giles: Nan-ch'ang Ch'i-i
Yue: Cantonese
- Yale Romanization: Naam4 cheung1 Hei2 yi6

Alternative Chinese name
- Traditional Chinese: 八一起義
- Simplified Chinese: 八一起义
- Literal meaning: 1 August Uprising
Transcriptions
Standard Mandarin
- Hanyu Pinyin: Bāyī Qǐyì
- Wade–Giles: Pa-i Ch'i-i
Yue: Cantonese
- Yale Romanization: Baat3 yat1 Hei2 yi6

The Nanchang Uprising (Note: Chinese: 南昌起义; pinyin: Nánchāng Qǐyì. In Chinese, the event is also known as the 1 August Uprising (八一起义; Bāyī Qǐyì). In the Republic of China, it often referred to as the Nanchang Rebellion or the August 1 Violence (八一暴力; Bāyī Bàolì).) of August 1927 was the point at which conflict between the Chinese Communist Party and the Nationalist Party of China (Kuomintang) became an outright rebellion. This began the Chinese Civil War. It was initiated by the Communists in response to the massacre of their party comrades in Shanghai by the Kuomintang four months before. The Kuomintang (KMT) left wing established a "Revolutionary Committee" at Nanchang to plant the spark that was expected to ignite a widespread peasant uprising. Deng Yanda, Song Qingling and Zhang Fakui (listed nominally, who later crushed the uprising) were among the political leaders.

Military forces in Nanchang under the leadership of He Long and Zhou Enlai rebelled in an attempt to seize control of the city after the end of the first Kuomintang-Communist alliance. Other important leaders in this event were Zhu De, Ye Ting, and Liu Bocheng. Communist forces successfully occupied Nanchang and escaped from the siege of Kuomintang forces by 5 August, withdrawing to the Jinggang Mountains of western Jiangxi. 1 August 1927 was later regarded as the anniversary of the founding of the People's Liberation Army (PLA) and the first action fought against the Kuomintang and the National Revolutionary Army (NRA).

== Background ==
During the First United Front, members of the CCP also joined the KMT, and the alliance's Northern Expedition was accompanied by mass workers' and peasants' movements, including a general strike by about 800,000 workers in Shanghai in March 1927. From April 1927, Chiang Kai-shek purged the Communists, beginning with the Shanghai massacre, in a campaign that killed tens of thousands of people. In mid-July, the left wing of the KMT based in Wuhan under Wang Jingwei also broke with the Communists, and the CCP's Comintern advisers returned to the Soviet Union. In Moscow, Stalin held that China was ready for an urban communist revolution, whereas Leon Trotsky opposed this view. According to the historian Bruce A. Elleman, Stalin ordered the CCP to organize an urban uprising in Nanchang. The CCP, which had lacked armed forces of its own, needed soldiers to survive, and officers sympathetic to the Communists, many of them trained at the Whampoa Military Academy, held commands in the National Revolutionary Army.

== Planning ==
In mid-July 1927, the CCP's central leadership sent Li Lisan, Deng Zhongxia, Tan Pingshan and Yun Daiying to Jiujiang to work with Ye Ting, deputy commander of the 11th Army and commander of its 24th Division, on a plan to return to Guangdong with Zhang Fakui. After it became clear that Zhang had sided with Wang Jingwei, the provisional standing committee of the Politburo decided on 24 July to stage an uprising in Nanchang, relying on He Long's 20th Army, Ye Ting's 24th Division and the officer training regiment of Zhu De. A Front Committee was formed with Zhou Enlai as secretary and Li Lisan, Yun Daiying and Peng Pai as members. Zhu De, who had former subordinates in Nanchang, gathered intelligence on the garrison and drew a map of the city's key points. Zhou arrived in Nanchang on 27 July, and on 28 July, he named He Long, who was not yet a party member, commander-in-chief and Liu Bocheng chief of staff.

A telegram from the Comintern, whose content was decided by Stalin and which was signed by Nikolai Bukharin, stated that the uprising need not be held if it had no chance of victory. The central leadership sent Zhang Guotao to Nanchang as its representative, and his insistence on securing Zhang Fakui's participation was strongly opposed by Zhou Enlai, Yun Daiying, Tan Pingshan and Li Lisan. On 31 July, the Front Committee set the start of the uprising for 4:00 am on 1 August, and that afternoon, He Long issued the operational order as acting commander of the Second Front Army. That evening, Zhu De held a banquet to keep two regimental commanders of the garrison away from their posts, but at about 9:00 pm, a deputy battalion commander in He Long's army betrayed the plan, and the Front Committee moved the start forward by two hours.

== Forces ==
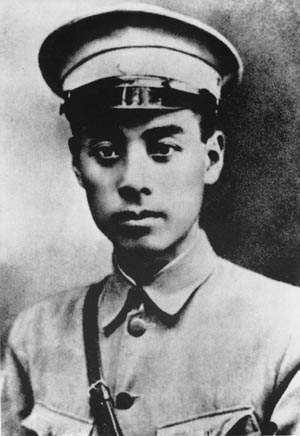
Zhou Enlai, secretary of the Front Committee

The insurgents numbered more than 20,000, although the historian Harold Tanner puts their peak strength at over 30,000. After two regiments of the 25th Division joined on 2 August, their strength reached about 20,500. The KMT garrison in Nanchang numbered over 3,000.

After the uprising, the insurgents kept the designation of the Second Front Army of the National Revolutionary Army, with He Long as acting commander-in-chief, Ye Ting as acting front commander, Liu Bocheng as chief of staff and Guo Moruo as head of the political department. The army was organized as follows.

- 9th Army, with Wei Chu as commander, although he never took up the post, Zhu De as deputy commander and Zhu Kejing as party representative
- 11th Army, with Ye Ting as commander and Nie Rongzhen as party representative, comprising the 10th Division under Cai Tingkai, the 24th Division and the 25th Division under Zhou Shidi
- 20th Army, with He Long as commander and Liao Qianwu as party representative

== Uprising ==
At 2:00 am on 1 August 1927, the insurgents, who wore red neckties and white towels on their left arms to identify themselves, attacked the garrison. He Long's 20th Army attacked the old provincial administration compound, Dashiyuan Street and the area of the Niuhang railway station, while Ye Ting's 24th Division attacked the Catholic church on Songbai Lane, the new barracks and Baihuazhou. The uprising was directed from the Jiangxi Grand Hotel. After more than four hours of fighting, the insurgents had killed over 1000 enemy troops and captured more than 5000 rifles. According to the historian James Carter, they controlled the city by 9:00 am, but KMT reinforcements under Zhang Fakui arrived faster than expected. That afternoon, the 73rd and 75th Regiments of the 25th Division at Mahuiling, near Jiujiang, rose under Nie Rongzhen and Zhou Shidi, and they reached Nanchang on 2 August.

=== Revolutionary Committee ===
On the morning of 1 August, Tan Pingshan convened a joint meeting of Communists and left-wing members of the KMT at the former seat of the Jiangxi provincial government, which elected a Revolutionary Committee of the Kuomintang and adopted a joint declaration. The committee was intended to provide the spark for a widespread peasant uprising. Its members included Soong Ching-ling, Deng Yanda and Zhang Fakui, who were listed nominally, as well as Zhou Enlai, Peng Pai and Li Lisan. Liu Bocheng headed its military staff, whose members included He Long, Ye Ting, Zhou Enlai and Cai Tingkai.

== Southern expedition ==
In accordance with the central leadership's plan, the insurgents left Nanchang between 3 and 7 August and headed for Guangdong, where they intended to establish a communist revolutionary government. He Long objected to the decision to withdraw. About 25,000 troops set out on what became known as the "Little Long March", and a third of them deserted within days. After a single day's march, Cai Tingkai led his 10th Division away, taking nearly a quarter of the force, and within three days, heat, hunger, illness and desertion had cost the army nearly a third of its strength. The army reached Fuzhou on 7 August and halted there to regroup, formally establishing the 9th Army and the 3rd Division of the 20th Army. The Front Committee also abandoned forced levies on the local gentry in favor of requisitions and fines imposed on landlords.

In late August, the insurgents defeated the forces of Qian Dajun north of Ruijin and took the town, and at Huichang, they inflicted about 6,000 casualties on Qian's main force while losing nearly 1,000 men. Because deserting staff officers might have revealed the original route, the Front Committee changed course after Ruijin to march through Changting and Shanghang in western Fujian. The vanguard reached Changting on 5 September, where the leadership decided to divide the army, sending the main force towards Chaozhou and Shantou and leaving a force to hold Sanheba.

The main force entered Shantou on 25 September after its defenders had withdrawn. In late September, after three days of fighting near Jieyang, it abandoned Chaozhou and Shantou and concentrated at Tangkeng, with about 6,000 men facing an enemy more than three times its size. At Sanheba, Zhu De's force fought Qian Dajun's troops, who numbered more than 20,000, for three days from 1 October before withdrawing with about 2,500 men. On 3 October, at a meeting in Liusha attended by 20 to 30 leaders, with Zhou Enlai suffering from a high fever, the Front Committee decided to abandon the name of the Revolutionary Committee of the Kuomintang, to carry out land revolution and to move to the Haifeng and Lufeng area. At Yunluo, the column was cut by the 11th Division of Chen Jitang, and the army disintegrated.

== Aftermath ==
About 1,200 men of the 24th Division under Dong Lang and Yan Changyi reached Haifeng and Lufeng, where they joined local peasant forces and became the 2nd Division of the Workers' and Peasants' Revolutionary Army. Zhou Enlai escaped by boat from Jiazi to Hong Kong and later went to Shanghai, as did He Long, and Ye Ting also fled to Hong Kong.

The remnants under Zhu De and Chen Yi moved into the border region of Guangdong, Jiangxi and Hunan to wage guerrilla war. By the end of 1927, they numbered about 1,000 according to Carter, or nearly 800 according to the People's Daily. In southern Jiangxi, Zhu De reorganized the troops in three stages, at Tianxinxu in Anyuan County, in the county seat of Dayu and at Shangbao in Chongyi County, establishing party branches in the units. In January 1928, Zhu and Chen launched an uprising in southern Hunan, and in late April 1928, they led more than 10,000 men to the Jinggang Mountains, where they joined Mao Zedong's forces to form the Fourth Army of the Chinese Workers' and Peasants' Red Army, with Zhu as commander and Mao as party representative.

== Assessments ==
The uprising is widely regarded as the beginning of the Chinese Civil War. In 1964, the historian C. Martin Wilbur translated contemporary Communist accounts of the revolt and its defeat by Li Lisan, Zhang Guotao and Zhou Yiqun, together with a 1927 party resolution that criticized the August and September uprisings and ordered disciplinary measures, including against Mao Zedong. The French diplomat and historian Jacques Guillermaz described 1 August 1927 as one of the great days in the history of the CCP, beginning a military phase that lasted more than twenty years.

Elleman argues that the Chinese Communists created a myth around Nanchang that presented the uprising as a success and tied the origins of the PLA to it. Carter writes that the uprising was designed largely to raise morale and show that the party remained viable, and that its leaders knew that their chances of lasting success were minimal. The CCP's official view is that the uprising fired the first shot of armed resistance against the KMT and marked the beginning of the party's independent leadership of revolutionary war, the creation of a people's army and the seizure of power by armed force. In 2017, Xi Jinping called it a great event in the history of the CCP.

== Commemoration ==
On 30 June 1933, the Central Revolutionary Military Commission designated 1 August, the date of the uprising, as the founding day of the Chinese Workers' and Peasants' Red Army, and the Provisional Central Government of the Chinese Soviet Republic approved the decision on 11 July. The date later became the Army Day of the PLA, and the characters for "8-1" appear on the PLA's emblem and insignia. In 2017, China marked the 90th anniversary of the PLA's founding with a military parade at which Xi called for a world-class army. The Nanchang August 1st Uprising Memorial Hall in Nanchang displays artefacts donated by the descendants of participants.

== See also ==
- Outline of the Chinese Civil War
- History of the People's Liberation Army
