= Haifeng County =

Haifeng 海丰县 Hoifung
- County
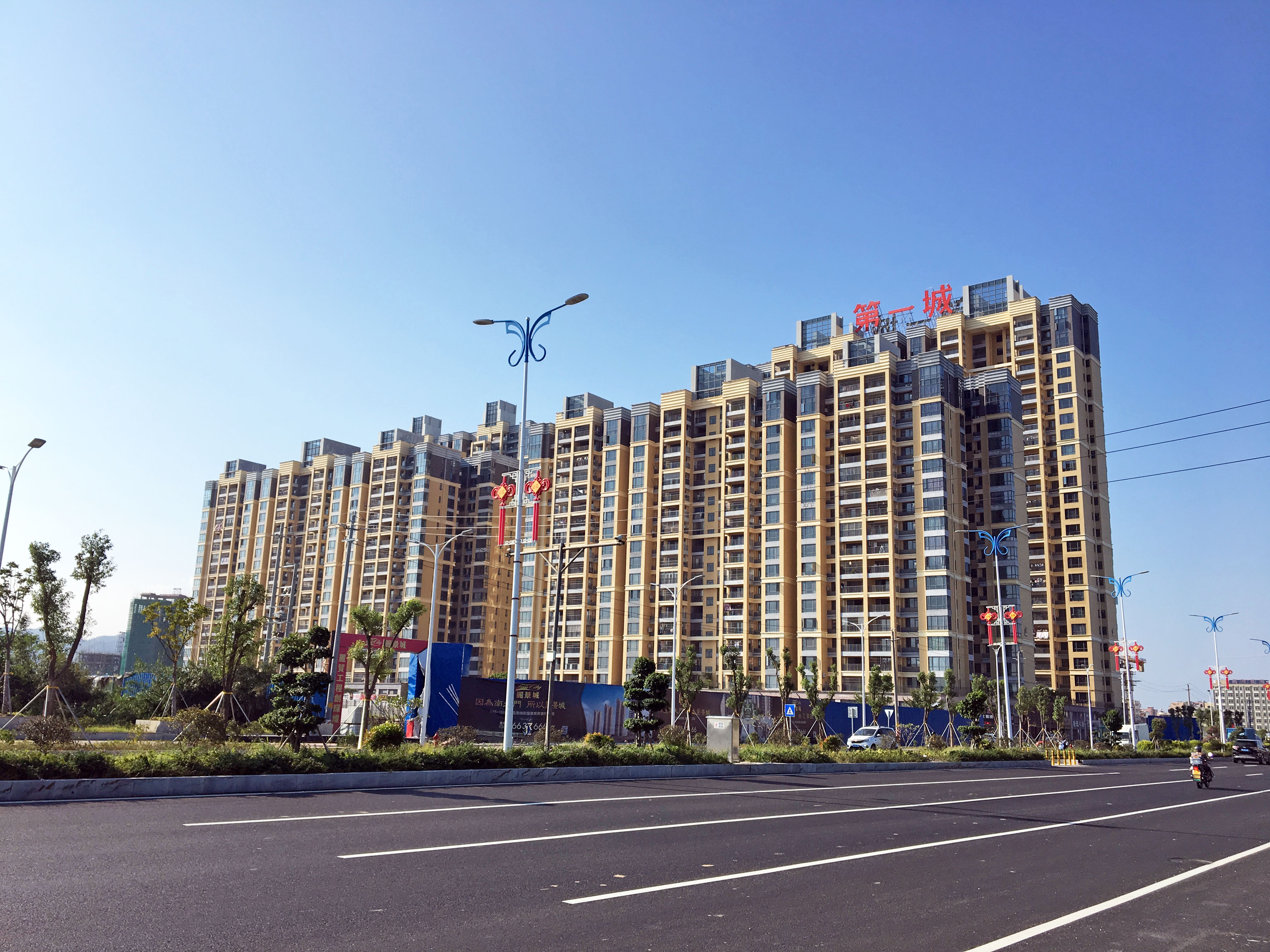

- Location of the seat in Guangdong
- Coordinates (Haifeng County government): 22°58′03″N 115°19′22″E
- Country: People's Republic of China
- Province: Guangdong
- Prefecture-level city: Shanwei

Area
  - Total: 1,750 km^{2} (680 sq mi)
- Elevation: 9 m (30 ft)
- Time zone: UTC+8 (China Standard)

Haifeng County (postal: Hoifung; simplified Chinese: 海丰县; traditional Chinese: 海豐縣; pinyin: Hǎifēng Xiàn; Pe̍h-ōe-jī: Hái-hong-koān) is a county under the administration of Shanwei, in the southeast of Guangdong Province, China.

== History ==
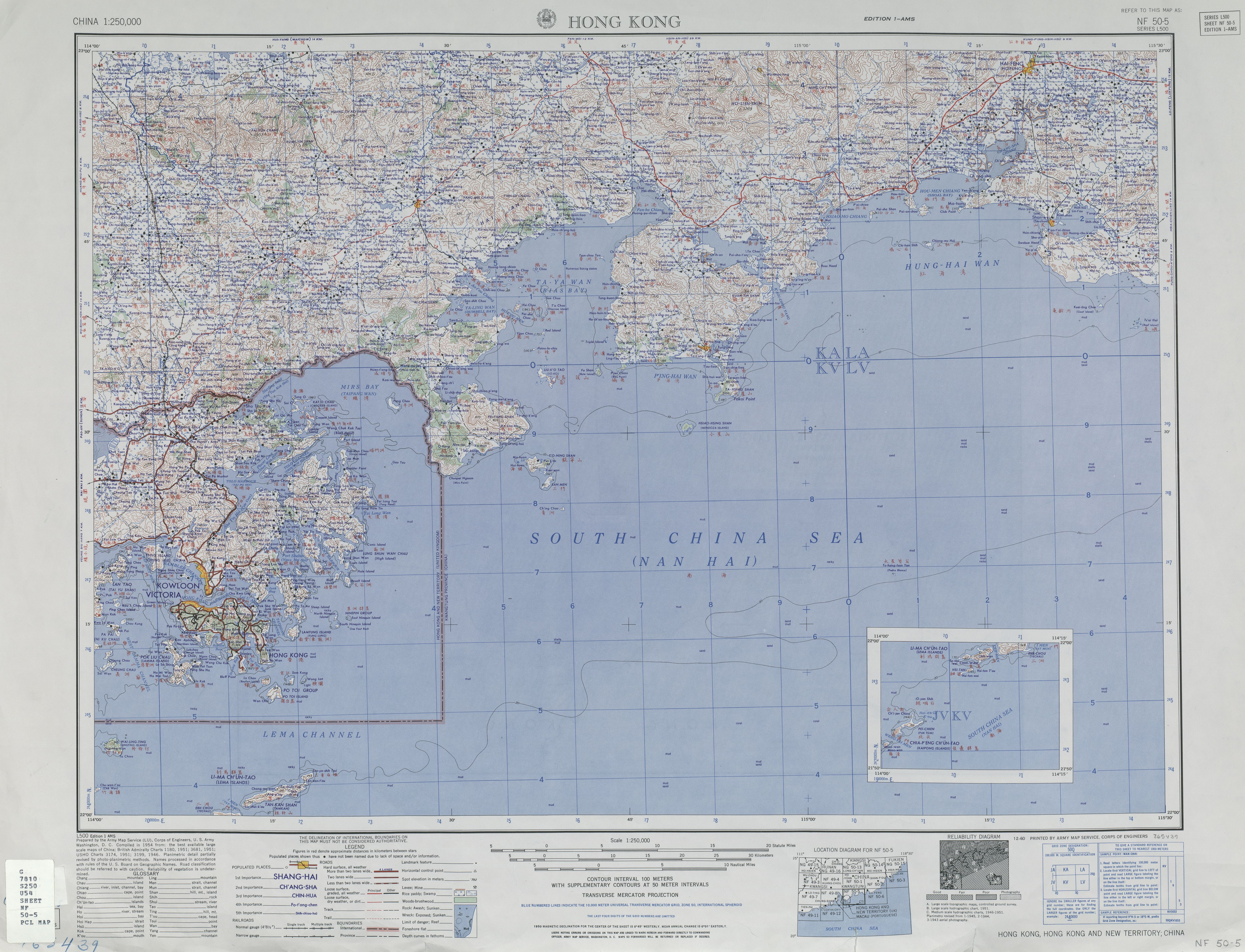
Map including Haifeng (labeled as HAI-FENG (HOIFUNG) 海豐) (1954)

Hakka peasants from nearby villages of Chengxiang county (modern-day Meixian) immigrated to Haifeng, forming numerous Hakka rural settlements in the county.

== Administrative divisions ==
Haifeng County currently comprises 3 administrative subdistricts and 13 administrative towns. They are:

- Meilong town (梅陇镇)
- Xiaomo subdistrict (小漠街道)
- Houmen town (鲘门镇)
- Lianan town (联安镇)
- Yaohe town (陶河镇)
- Chikeng town (赤坑镇)
- Dahu town (大湖镇)
- Ketang town (可塘镇)
- Huangqiang town (黄羌镇)
- Pingdong town (平东镇)
- Haicheng town (海城镇)
- Ebu subdistrict (鹅埠街道)
- Chishi subdistrict (赤石街道)
- Gongping town (公平镇)
- Fucheng town (附城镇)
- Chengdong town (城东镇)

== Languages ==
Hoklo (Ho̍-lóh) and Hakka (Hak-kâ-fa) are used in the area.

== Climate ==
Climate data for Haifeng, elevation 46 m (151 ft), (1991–2020 normals, extremes 1960–2021)
Month	Jan	Feb	Mar	Apr	May	Jun	Jul	Aug	Sep	Oct	Nov	Dec	Year
Record high °C (°F)	28.2 (82.8)	30.1 (86.2)	30.6 (87.1)	33.7 (92.7)	33.1 (91.6)	36.7 (98.1)	38.8 (101.8)	38.1 (100.6)	36.5 (97.7)	34.5 (94.1)	33.1 (91.6)	30.4 (86.7)	38.8 (101.8)
Mean daily maximum °C (°F)	20.5 (68.9)	21.0 (69.8)	22.9 (73.2)	26.1 (79.0)	29.1 (84.4)	30.8 (87.4)	32.4 (90.3)	32.5 (90.5)	31.9 (89.4)	29.7 (85.5)	26.4 (79.5)	22.3 (72.1)	27.1 (80.8)
Daily mean °C (°F)	15.4 (59.7)	16.3 (61.3)	18.7 (65.7)	22.3 (72.1)	25.5 (77.9)	27.6 (81.7)	28.7 (83.7)	28.5 (83.3)	27.7 (81.9)	25.1 (77.2)	21.4 (70.5)	17.1 (62.8)	22.9 (73.1)
Mean daily minimum °C (°F)	12.1 (53.8)	13.3 (55.9)	15.9 (60.6)	19.6 (67.3)	22.9 (73.2)	25.1 (77.2)	25.9 (78.6)	25.7 (78.3)	24.7 (76.5)	21.8 (71.2)	17.9 (64.2)	13.6 (56.5)	19.9 (67.8)
Record low °C (°F)	−0.6 (30.9)	3.6 (38.5)	4.2 (39.6)	10.0 (50.0)	13.8 (56.8)	18.8 (65.8)	21.5 (70.7)	21.5 (70.7)	18.2 (64.8)	12.4 (54.3)	7.2 (45.0)	1.7 (35.1)	−0.6 (30.9)
Average precipitation mm (inches)	40.2 (1.58)	50.8 (2.00)	113.4 (4.46)	192.8 (7.59)	395.6 (15.57)	579.3 (22.81)	401.8 (15.82)	424.5 (16.71)	229.8 (9.05)	56.5 (2.22)	35.5 (1.40)	33.4 (1.31)	2,553.6 (100.52)
Average precipitation days (≥ 0.1 mm)	5.9	9.4	12.9	14.8	17.7	20.8	19.1	17.5	13.2	5.1	4.8	5.3	146.5
Average relative humidity (%)	70	76	79	82	83	85	83	82	77	71	70	67	77
Mean monthly sunshine hours	145.6	102.7	93.6	100.0	127.0	147.0	199.0	183.6	181.3	200.4	175.4	161.9	1,817.5
Percentage possible sunshine	43	32	25	26	31	36	48	46	50	56	53	49	41
Source: China Meteorological Administrationall-time record low

== Notable people ==
- Peng Pai
- Wu Tiao Ren

== See also ==
- Red Palace and Red Square
