= Peng Pai =

Chinese agrarian movement and peasants' rights activist (1896–1929)

- 彭湃
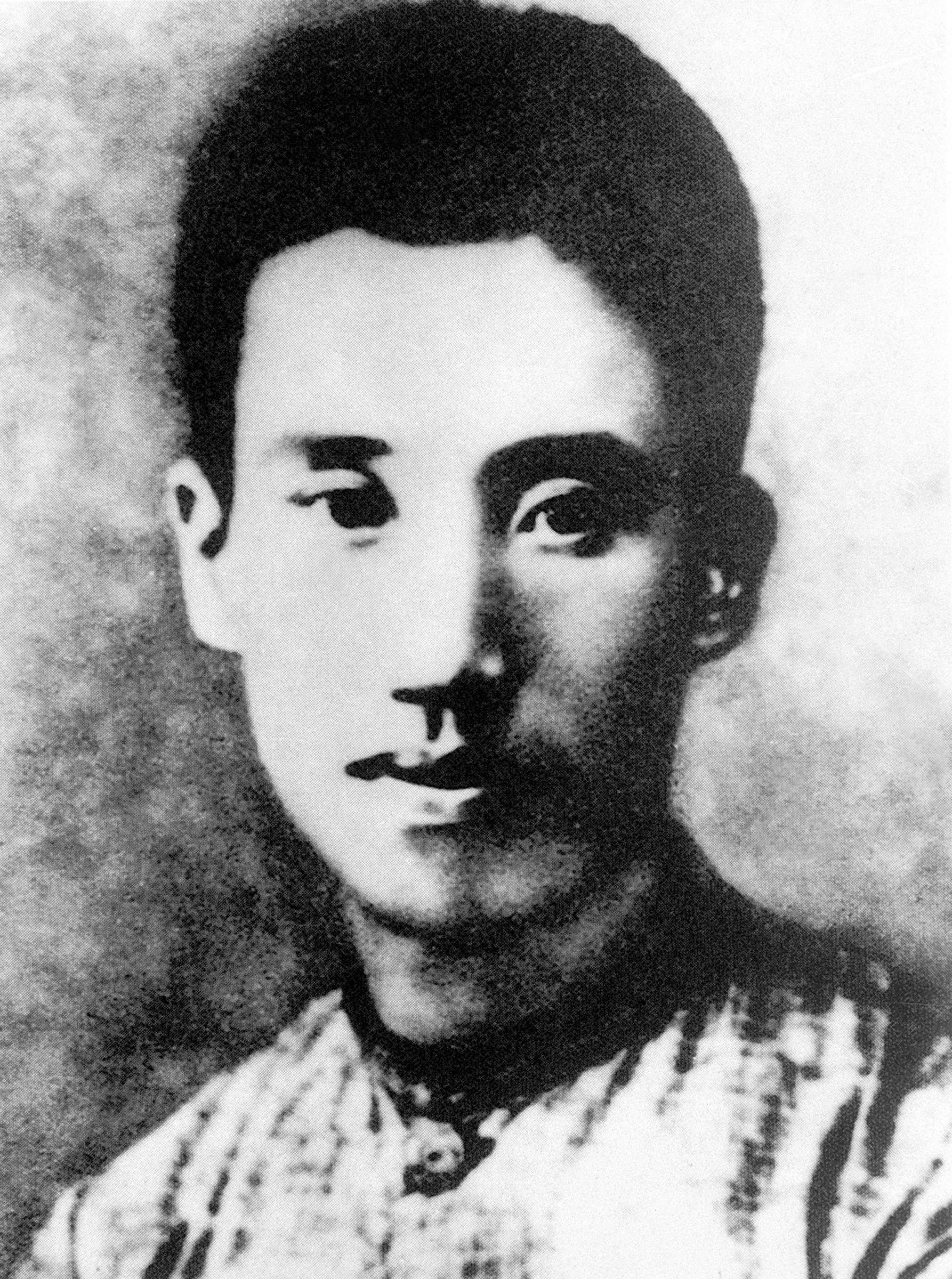
- Born: October 22, 1896; Haifeng, Guangdong, Qing Dynasty
- Died: August 30, 1929 (aged 32); Shanghai, China
- Political party: Chinese Communist Party (1921 - August 30, 1929); Kuomintang (1924-1927)

Peng Pai (Chinese: 彭湃; pinyin: Péng Pài; Wade–Giles: P'êng^{²} P'ai^{⁴}; Pe̍h-ōe-jī: Phêng-phài; October 22, 1896 – August 30, 1929) was a pioneer of the Chinese agrarian movement and a leading revolutionary in the Chinese Communist Party (CCP) during its early years. He was born in Haifeng, Guangdong Province, China. Peng Pai was one of the few Chinese intellectuals who were aware in the early 1920s that peasantry and land issues caused the most critical problems for Chinese society. He believed that the success of any revolution in China must depend on the peasants as its base foundation. After his death, Peng was praised by Mao Zedong as "the king of peasant movement".

== Early life ==
Peng Pai was born on October 22, 1896, in Haifeng, Guangdong province. His father Peng Xin (彭辛), was part of an elite Hokkien-speaking landlord and merchant family that rented land to more than 1,500 tenant farmers. His mother, Zhou Feng (周凤), came from an impoverished family. When she was eighteen, her parents had sold her as a concubine to Peng Xin. Peng Pai was the second of three sons they would have together. His brothers Peng Hanyuan (彭汉垣) and Peng Shu (彭述) would later join Pai's revolutionary movement in Haifeng. All three brothers lost their lives for this cause and would be honored as "Revolutionary Martyrs" by the People's Republic of China.

In 1916, as a student in the local Haifeng County High School, Peng Pai protested against the local gentry's plan to placate a hostile official by building a statue of him.

== Study in Japan (1917–1921) ==
Peng Pai went to Japan in 1917 and changed his name from Peng Hanyu. He studied politico-economics at Waseda University in Tokyo. There he experienced several historical events of in the aftermath of World War I that forever changed China and Sino-Japan relations. He witnessed the Rice Riots of 1918 in Japan, and was influenced by the October Revolution in Russia. In consequence, Peng Pai converted from a Christian to a socialist. He believed that only a complete social, political, and economic revolution and the creation of a socialist system could ensure China's survival.

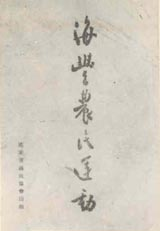
Reports on the Haifeng Peasant Movement by Peng Pai, published in 1926. The title's Chinese Characters were handwritten then by Zhou Enlai

== Education commissioner of Haifeng (1921–1922) ==
Peng Pai finished his study in Japan and returned to Haifeng in the summer of 1921. He was appointed as the Commissioner of the Education Bureau of Haifeng County in October. He created new schools, revised the curriculums, and recruited young teachers and principals with pro-socialist ideals. He organized a May Day celebration parade to the county seat involving his students and "many boys and girls of wealthy families" in 1922.

== Launching and leading peasant movement (1922–1926) ==
In the summer of 1922, Peng Pai was dismissed from the Education Commissioner position because of his organizing the May Day parade. Soon after he left that position, Peng Pai launched and led the peasant revolution movement in Haifeng. He advocated socialism by editing a journal Red Heart Weekly (or Sincere Heart Weekly) and using a gramophone to play music and songs to gather the villagers and try to convince them to form peasant organizations. To politically awaken peasants and encourage them to fight for their own rights and to liberate themselves from social injustice, Peng Pai burned all the title deeds of his inherited lands in public, and announced to his peasants that the lands they were cultivating henceforth belonged to them. After such unusual and sincere efforts, he succeeded in forming the first countywide Peasant Association in China, the Haifeng County Peasant Association. The association campaigned for lower rents, led anti-landlord boycotts, and organized welfare activities. He was elected the Association President on New Year's Day in 1923. By that time, the Association claimed its membership of about 20,000 families covering 100,000 persons, or one-quarter of the population of the entire county.

In 1924, Peng Pai became a member of Kuomintang (KMT or Nationalist Party) as individuals and served as the Secretary of Peasant Department of KMT Central Committee, as the KMT-CCP Alliance had been formed since 1923. The KMT was then led by Sun Yat-sen and carried out the policies of "alliance with Soviet Russia, cooperation with the Communists, and assistance to peasant and worker movements". Based on Peng Pai's idea and suggestion, the KMT Central Committee decided to set up the Peasant Movement Training Institute (PMTI) to train young idealists who then went out to educate the masses in rural China. Peng Pai was the director of the 1st and 5th terms of the PMTI, while Mao Zedong was the director of the 6th term. Peng Pai finished his famous Report on the Haifeng Peasant Movement there and published it in The Chinese Peasants in 1926.

== Hailufeng Soviet ==
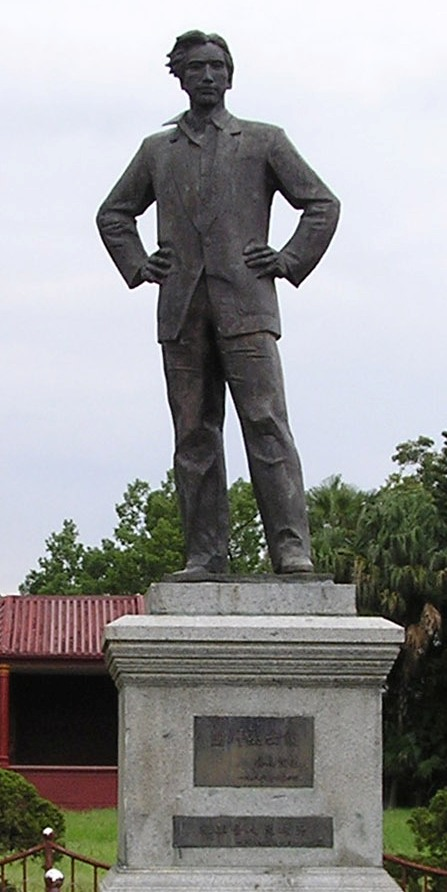
A Statue of Peng Pai in Haifeng, Guangdong Province, China.

On April 12, 1927, Chiang Kai-shek and his right wing in the KMT launched the historic incident of "Party purge" or "Shanghai massacre of April 12 Coup". Many prominent Communist and left wing members of the KMT along with tens of thousands of the masses suspected pro-CCP were imprisoned or slaughtered. Peng Pai was elected as a member of the CCP Central Committee on the 5th National Congress held in Wuhan during April and May. He was lately appointed as a member of the CCP Front Committee led by Zhou Enlai for organizing and directing the Nanchang Uprising launched on August 1 of that year. He was elected as a member of CCP Politburo on the August 7th Emergency Meeting of the party. Peng Pai returned to Guangdong following the Nachang Uprising troops, and established the Hailufeng Soviet after successful organizing and launching an armed uprising in Haifeng and Lufeng counties in mid November. He was the President of the Hailufeng Soviet, the 1st Soviet in Chinese history. As a reply to the "White Terror" launched on April 12 by Chiang Kai-shek and the KMT, the Hailufeng Soviet engaged in a "Red Terror".

Dutch historian Frank Dikötter claimed that Peng Pai had suggested to the Soviet's followers that they should eliminate 40 per cent of the population, listing 28 undesirable "classes" of people, including soothsayers, prostitutes, incurably sick, priests and the elderly. Frank Dikötter's views on China history are highly controversial and have drawn criticism from other historians including Kathleen L. Lodwick, Alan Baumler, Timothy Brook, Felix Wemheuer, Cormac Ó Gráda, Anthony Garnaut, Andrew G. Walder, Brian DeMare, Daniel Leese, Fabio Lanza, Ian Johnson and Philip Short.

In the spring of 1928, less than four months after its inauguration, the Hailufeng Soviet was crushed by KMT troops with overwhelming superiority. Peng Pai left Guangdong for Shanghai following CCP Central Committee's directive.

In July 1928, on the 6th National Congress of the CCP, Peng Pai was elected as a Politburo member and served as the Secretary of the Central Agrarian Movement Committee and a member of the Central Military Affairs Commission of the CCP.

== Imprisonment and death ==
In 1929, Peng Pai was betrayed by his secretary Bai Xin (白鑫). While at a meeting in Shanghai on August 24, Peng, Yang Yin (杨殷) and three other CCP leaders were arrested by the KMT. Peng Pai firmly refused to renounce his beliefs during his imprisonment, even under torture. Zhou Enlai, leading the Central Special Task Units (CSTU) of the CCP, organized an action attempting to rescue Peng Pai but this failed. On August 30, Peng Pai was secretly killed at Longhua, Shanghai by the KMT government on the orders of Chiang Kai-shek. On November 11, per Zhou Enlai's order, Chen Geng and Gu Shunzhang directed the CSTU with its Red Squad to kill Peng's betrayer, Bai Xin, outside of his hidden shelter in Shanghai.

In memory of Peng Pai and Yang Yin, the CCP named its military academy the "Peng-Yang Military Academy of the Red Army".

== Works ==
- Report on the Haifeng Peasant Movement (海丰农民运动)
- Peng Pai anthology (collection) (彭湃文集)

== Family ==
Peng Pai's second son, Peng Shilu, the first chief designer of China's nuclear submarine (Type 091 and Type 092) project, is hailed the "father of China's nuclear submarines" and the "founding father of China's Naval Nuclear Propulsion". He was selected as a member of the Chinese Academy of Engineering for his contributions and expertise in nuclear propulsion and Nuclear Power Engineering.

Peng Shige, a grandson of Peng Pai's elder brother Peng Hanyuan, is a distinguished mathematician and an academician of the Chinese Academy of Sciences. He is noted for his contributions in stochastic analysis and founding of Mathematical Finance in China.

== Legacy ==
In 1957, Haifeng County High School (where Peng Pai had attended) was renamed the "Peng Pai Memorial High School".

During the Chinese Cultural Revolution, the Anti-Peng Pai Incident (反彭湃事件) broke out in Shanwei, Guangdong, targeting the relatives of Peng Pai. Peng Pai's mother was jailed, and his third son Peng Hong (彭洪) was killed and buried secretly; a cousin and a nephew of Peng Pai were also killed in a massacre which resulted in the deaths of over 160 people, and the head of the nephew was hung up on the pole and shown to the public for three days. In 1978 after the end of the Cultural Revolution, Xi Zhongxun was in charge of Guangdong province and officially redressed this incident as well as rehabilitated Peng Pai's relatives and all the related victims.

== See also ==
- Hailufeng Soviet
- Guangdong Cultural Revolution Massacre
