= Campaigns to Suppress Bandits =

Campaigns to Suppress Bandits, counter-guerrilla campaigns fought by Chinese communists against the nationalist guerrilla during the Chinese Civil War, include:

- Campaign to Suppress Bandits in Northern China
- Campaign to Suppress Bandits in Northeast China
- Campaign to Suppress Bandits in Eastern China
  - Campaign to Suppress Bandits in Wuping
- Campaign to Suppress Bandits in Central and Southern China
  - Campaign to Suppress Bandits in Northern Guangdong
  - Campaign to Suppress Bandits in Liuwandashan
  - Campaign to Suppress Bandits in Dabieshan
  - Campaign to Suppress Bandits in Shiwandashan
  - Campaign to Suppress Bandits in the Border Region of Hunan–Hubei–Sichuan
  - Campaign to Suppress Bandits in Western Guangxi
  - Campaign to Suppress Bandits in Western Hunan
- Campaign to Suppress Bandits in Southwestern China
  - Campaign to Suppress Bandits in Northeastern Guizhou
- Campaign to Suppress Bandits in Northwestern China
  - Campaign to Suppress Bandits in Longquan

== See also ==
- Campaign to Suppress Counterrevolutionaries
- Three-anti and Five-anti Campaigns
- Hundred Flowers Campaign
- Anti-Rightist Campaign
- Socialist Education Movement
- Third Front (China)
