= Outline of the Chinese Civil War =

The following is a topical outline of English Wikipedia articles about the history of the Chinese Civil War (1927–1949) (Note: See Outline of the military history of the People's Republic of China for a full outline of the military history of the People's Republic of China.)

The Chinese Civil War was fought between the Kuomintang-led government of the Republic of China and the forces of the Chinese Communist Party (CCP), with armed conflict continuing intermittently from 1 August 1927 until Communist victory resulted in their total control over mainland China on 7 December 1949.

== Background and overviews ==
- Chinese Civil War
- Chinese Communist Revolution
- Communist-controlled China (1927–1949)
- First United Front
- Golok conflicts (1917–1949)
- History of the People's Liberation Army
- History of the People's Republic of China
- Retreat of the government of the Republic of China to Taiwan
- Second United Front

== Events ==
=== Campaigns ===
- Bobai campaign
- Campaign along the Southern Section of Datong–Puzhou Railway
- Campaign at the China–Burma border
- Campaign in the Eastern Foothills of the Funiu Mountains
- Campaign of the North China Plain Pocket
- Campaign to the North of Baoding
- Campaign to the North of Daqing River
- Campaign to the North of Nanchuan County
- Campaign to the South of Baoding
- Chengdu campaign
- Datong–Jining Campaign
- Datong–Puzhou campaign
- Dingtao Campaign
- Gaoyou–Shaobo campaign
- Gongzhutun Campaign
- Guangxi campaign
- Handan Campaign
- Hebei–Rehe–Chahar Campaign
- Heshui Campaign
- Houma Campaign
- Huaihai campaign
- Huaiyin–Huai'an campaign
- Jingshan–Zhongxiang Campaign
- Lanzhou Campaign
- Liaoshen campaign
- Linfen Campaign
- Linfen–Fushan Campaign
- Linjiang Campaign
- Linyi Campaign
- Longhai Campaign
- Lüliang Campaign
- Menglianggu campaign
- Meridian Ridge Campaign
- Nanma–Linqu Campaign
- Ningxia Campaign (1949)
- Opening Campaign
- Pingdu Campaign
- Pingjin campaign
- Shangdang Campaign
- Shanghai Campaign
- Shuangduiji campaign
- Siping Campaign
- Southern Jiangsu Campaign
- Taixing Campaign
- Taiyuan campaign
- Tianjin campaign
- Weixian–Guangling–Nuanquan Campaign
- Western Tai'an Campaign
- Wudi Campaign
- Xinghua Campaign
- Yangtze River Crossing campaign
- Yanzhou campaign
- Yetaishan Campaign
- Zhengtai Campaign
- Zhiluozhen Campaign
- Zhoucun–Zhangdian Campaign
- Zhucheng Campaign

==== Line ====
- Li Lisan Line

==== War ====
- Southern Guerrilla War

==== Offensive ====
- Autumn Offensive of 1947 in Northeast China
- Summer Offensive of 1947 in Northeast China
- Winter Offensive of 1947 in Northeast China

==== Counterinsurgency ====
- Campaign to Suppress Bandits in Central and Southern China
- Campaign to Suppress Bandits in Dabieshan
- Campaign to Suppress Bandits in Eastern China
- Campaign to Suppress Bandits in Liuwandashan
- Campaign to Suppress Bandits in Longquan
- Campaign to Suppress Bandits in Northeast China
- Campaign to Suppress Bandits in Northeastern Guizhou
- Campaign to Suppress Bandits in Northern China
- Campaign to Suppress Bandits in Northern Guangdong
- Campaign to Suppress Bandits in Northwestern China
- Campaign to Suppress Bandits in Shiwandashan
- Campaign to Suppress Bandits in Southwestern China
- Campaign to Suppress Bandits in the Border Region of Hunan–Hubei–Sichuan
- Campaign to Suppress Bandits in Western Guangxi
- Campaign to Suppress Bandits in Western Hunan
- Campaign to Suppress Bandits in Wuping

==== Encirclement ====
- Encirclement campaign against the Hunan-Hubei-Jiangxi Soviet
- Encirclement campaign against the Hunan-Hubei-Sichuan-Guizhou Soviet
- Encirclement campaign against the Hunan-Jiangxi Soviet
- Encirclement campaign against the Hunan–Western Hubei Soviet
- Encirclement campaign against the Northeastern Jiangxi Soviet
- Fifth encirclement campaign against the Eyuwan Soviet
- Fifth encirclement campaign against the Jiangxi Soviet
- First encirclement campaign against the Eyuwan Soviet
- First encirclement campaign against the Honghu Soviet
- First encirclement campaign against the Hubei–Henan–Shaanxi Soviet
- First encirclement campaign against the Jiangxi Soviet
- First encirclement campaign against the Shaanxi–Gansu Soviet
- Fourth encirclement campaign against the Eyuwan Soviet
- Fourth encirclement campaign against the Jiangxi Soviet
- Second encirclement campaign against the Eyuwan Soviet
- Second encirclement campaign against the Honghu Soviet
- Second encirclement campaign against the Hubei–Henan–Shaanxi Soviet
- Second encirclement campaign against the Jiangxi Soviet
- Second encirclement campaign against the Shaanxi–Gansu Soviet
- Third encirclement campaign against the Eyuwan Soviet
- Third encirclement campaign against the Honghu Soviet
- Third encirclement campaign against the Jiangxi Soviet
- Third encirclement campaign against the Shaanxi–Gansu Soviet

==== Marine ====
- Dongshan Island Campaign
- Wanshan Archipelago Campaign

=== Battles ===
- Battle of Bamianshan
- Battle of Baoying
- Battle of Chishui River
- Battle of Dazhongji
- Battle of Guanzhong (1946–1947)
- Battle of Houmajia
- Battle of Huaiyin–Huai'an
- Battle of Jinan
- Battle of Jinzhou
- Battle of Jiulianshan
- Battle of Kalgan
- Battle of Lingbi
- Battle of Lishi
- Battle of Luding Bridge
- Battle of Niangziguan
- Battle of Phoenix Peak
- Battle of Rugao
- Battle of Rugao–Huangqiao
- Battle of Shangcai
- Battle of Shantou (1927)
- Battle of Shaobo
- Battle of Shicun
- Battle of Shuangqiaozhen
- Battle of Siping
- Battle of Tang'erli
- Battle of Tangtou–Guocun
- Battle of Tashan
- Battle of Tianmen
- Battle of Tianquan
- Battle of Weixian
- Battle of Wuhe
- Battle of Xiangshuikou
- Battle of Yan'an
- Battle of Yinji
- Battle of Yiwu
- Battle of Yongjiazhen

==== Siege ====
- Siege of Changchun

==== Marine ====
- Battle of Dalushan Islands
- Battle of Dengbu Island
- Battle of Dongshan Island
- Battle of Guningtou
- Battle of Hainan Island
- Battle of Nan'ao Island
- Battle of Nanpeng Archipelago
- Battle of Nanpeng Island
- Battle of Nanri Island

=== Uprisings ===
- Autumn Harvest Uprising
- Baise Uprising
- Guangzhou Uprising
- Longzhou Uprising
- Nanchang Uprising
- Ningdu Uprising
- Weihua Uprising
- Huang'an-Macheng Uprising

=== Incidents ===
- Canton Coup
- Shanghai Massacre (1927)
- Jiaochangkou Incident
- New Fourth Army Incident
- Tonghua Incident
- Xi'an Incident
- Yu Zisan Incident

=== Other events ===
- Chongqing Negotiations
- Little Long March
- Long March
- Operation Beleaguer
- White Terror (China)

== People ==
=== Individuals ===
- Anna Louise Strong
- Barbara Stephens (journalist)
- Cao Lihuai
- Chen Bijun
- Chen Hsing-ling
- Chen Mingren
- Chen Shaokun
- Chen Yi (marshal)
- Chiang Kai-shek
- Chiang Wei-kuo
- David Galula
- Deng Xiaoping
- Eleutherius Winance
- Eugene Chen
- Fang Chih
- Fang Zhenwu
- Feng Baiju
- Fu Zhong
- George C. Marshall
- Guo Tianmin
- Han Deqin
- He Bingyan
- Hu Di
- Huang Baitao
- Imamura Hosaku
- James Gareth Endicott
- Ji Xingwen
- John Roderick (correspondent)
- Ku Cheng-kang
- Li Guang (born 1914)
- Li Lun (general)
- Li Mi (Republic of China general)
- Li Tianyou
- Li Zhen (female general)
- Liang Huazhi
- Lin Biao
- Liu Bocheng
- Liu Fangwu
- Liu Luyin
- Liu Ruming
- Liu Zhen (PRC)
- Liu Zhenhua
- Lu Zhankui
- Ma clique
- Ma Dunjing (1910–2003)
- Ma Haide
- Ma Ning
- Mao Zedong
- Mikhail Borodin
- Moon Fun Chin
- Nie Rongzhen
- Otto Braun (communist)
- Pai Wan-hsiang
- Pan Zili
- Pang Ho-san
- Peng Dehuai
- Percy Chen
- Qian Zhuangfei
- Ren Bishi
- Rewi Alley
- Richard Frey
- Sanggyai Yexe
- Sheng Shicai
- Su Zhenhua
- Sun Li-jen
- Sun Yuanliang
- Tan Xilin
- Tang Liang
- Walter Stennes
- Wang Bingnan
- Wang Jingwei
- Wang Shijie
- Wang Xinting
- Wang Yaowu
- Wang Youping
- Wang Yun-wu
- Wei Guoqing
- Xiang Xuan
- Xiang Ying
- Xiong Xianghui
- Yan Xishan
- Ye Xiufeng
- Yu Guanglang
- Zhang Guotao
- Zhang Lingfu
- Zhang Qinqiu
- Zhang Wenbin (vice minister)
- Zhang Zuolin
- Zhao Zhongrong
- Zhou Enlai
- Zhou Yiqing
- Zhu De

=== Groups and organisations ===
- Army groups of the National Revolutionary Army
- Chinese Communist Party
- Chinese Red Army
- Chinese Soviet Republic
- Green Gang
- Hailufeng Soviet
- Hunan–Hubei–Jiangxi Soviet
- Hunan-Hubei-Sichuan-Guizhou Soviet
- Jiangxi Soviet
- Northeastern Army
- Northwest Chinese Soviet Federation
- People's Liberation Army
- Waishengren
- Yan'an Soviet

== Geography and locations ==
- Fushun War Criminals Management Centre
- General Suppression Headquarters of Xuzhou Garrison
- Hailufeng Soviet
- Hunan–Hubei–Jiangxi Soviet
- Hunan-Hubei-Sichuan-Guizhou Soviet
- Jiangxi Soviet
- Jinggang Mountains
- Lazikou Pass
- Moscow Sun Yat-sen University
- Nanchang Laoyingfang Airport
- Nanchang Qingyunpu Airport
- Northwestern Youth Labor Camp
- Site of Joining Forces in Wenjiashi of Autumn Harvest Uprising
- Zhong'anlun Monument

== Documents, speeches, and proclamation ==
- August 1 Declaration
- Double Tenth Agreement
- Proclamation of the People's Republic of China

== See also ==
- Outline of the military history of the People's Republic of China
- List of wars involving the People's Republic of China
- Chinese Civil War order of battle
- Timeline of the Chinese Civil War
- List of Chinese wars and battles
- List of wars involving the Republic of China
- List of wars involving Taiwan
- Bibliography of works by Mao Zedong
