= Battle of Phoenix Peak =

1947 battle

- Part of Chinese Civil War
Date	December 7, 1947 – December 9, 1947
Location	Laiyang, China
Result	Communist victory

Belligerents
Flag of the National Revolutionary Army National Revolutionary Army	PLA People's Liberation Army

Commanders and leaders
Huang Guoliang; Huang Baitao	Xu Shiyou

Strength
1,200	250

Casualties and losses
1000	50

The Battle of Phoenix Peak (Feng Huang Ding) is also called the Battle to Check Enemy's Advance at Phoenix Peak (Feng Huang Ding Zu Ji Zhan) by the Chinese Communist Party, and it was fought during Laiyang Campaign between the nationalists and the communists during the Chinese Civil War in the post World War II era.

== Prelude ==
After Laiyang was besieged by the communist 7th Column, the nationalist planned to reinforce the city first and then annihilate the local communists in a decisive battle by luring them out to fight in the open at the gate of the city, in conditions that favored the nationalists. The nationalists managed to gather a total of eight brigades from different divisions to reinforce the Laiyang and the overall command of the reinforcement was put under the command of the nationalist 64th Division, Huang Guoliang 黄国梁. The communist 2nd Column was tasked to stop the nationalist reinforcement at the several key locations and one of them was Phoenix Peak (Feng Huang Ding, 凤凰顶). The 3rd Battalion of the 13th Regiment of the 5th Division of the communist 2nd Column was tasked to defend Phoenix Peak (Feng Huang Ding, 凤凰顶) with following deployments: the battalion headquarters was located at north side of the peak, the 7th Company with two heavy machine guns held the left flank, the 9th Company in the northwest of the peak as reserve. The communist 8th Company was at the front while the communist mortar company was behind the 8th Company. On December 6, 1947, the communist 3rd Battalion entered its pre-designated positions. Two lines of obstacles were built and mines in the form of hand grenades and dynamite sticks were laid. Antitank teams included bazooka teams were also deployed.

== Battle ==
At 7:00 am on December 8, 1947, the nationalists begun their push toward Phoenix Peak (Feng Huang Ding, 凤凰顶), and a total of five battalions from the nationalist 54th Army was committed. The nationalists attacked the positions held by the 5th Division of the communist 2nd Column from Greater Po (Da Po, 大泊) and Lesser Po (Xiao Po, 小泊) in three fronts. On December 9, 1947, the nationalist aircraft attacked the positions at the Phoenix Peak (Feng Huang Ding, 凤凰顶) held by the communist 7th Company and the 8th Company in conjunction with the nationalist shelling. With the exception of observers and patrols, majority of the defenders were forced to take cover in the fortifications. 3rd Squad of the communist 8th Company discovered six or seven nationalist plain-cloth scouts approaching the communist positions, and a short burst of machine gun fire was enough to turn them back. Soon after, the defenders discovered that a nationalist tank approached within 300 metres of the position held by the communist 1st Platoon. The defenders opened up with everything they had, and thus exposed their positions. Ten minutes later, three more tanks joined the original one in shelling the communist positions 200 meters away, but failed to inflict any heavy casualties on the defenders, but they did manage to destroy some of the defenders’ fortifications.

At 9:15 am, two nationalist companies attacked the position held by the 3rd Squad of the communist 8th Company by following a tank that provided cover. The defenders concentrated their fire on the infantry behind the tank while a communist soldier jumped out of trench and approached the nationalist tank, and then inserted hand grenades between the tracks and wheels of the tank, successfully blowing up the tank. Losing their armor cover, the follow on nationalist attacks were beaten back for three time consecutively before the nationalist were forced to abandon any further attacks. The At 10:30 am, a nationalist platoon attacked the junction of the 2nd Squad and the 6th Squad of the communist 8th Company, while a nationalist company attacked the left flank of the communist 3rd Squad. The 2nd Squad and the 6th Squad of the communist 8th Company driven back the attackers and the communist company commander also redeployed the heavy machine gun to the right flank of the communist 1st Platoon, and successfully checked the third nationalist assault on the positions held by the 3rd Platoon of the communist 8th Company. The nationalist attackers made a brief gain when they took the positions held by communist 3rd Squad, but the victory was short-lived: the communist company commander personally led the 8th Squad to counterattack immediately from the flank and wiped out every surviving nationalist attacker and destroyed a nationalist tank in the process. After failing repeatedly in their attacks on the positions held by the communist 8th Company, the nationalists changed their objective by attacking the position held by the communist 7th Company from 11:30 am on, but the battalion sized assaulting force was driven back every time due to heavy enemy fire.

At 3:00 pm, the nationalists launched two attacks simultaneously: one nationalist company attacked the position of the communist 7th Company, while two other nationalist companies attacked the position held by the communist 2nd Platoon of the 8th Company. The commander of the communist 3rd battalion defending the Phoenix Peak (Feng Huang Ding, 凤凰顶) immediately reinforced the position held by the communist 2nd Platoon of the 8th Company by sending additional bazooka and heavy machine gun crew, which helped the defender to beat back the attackers after fierce battle. The other position did not fare well: after a fierce battle that lasted over an hour, the 1st Platoon and the 2nd Platoon of the communist 7th Company was not able to check the advancing nationalists due to the heavy casualties suffered by the 1st Platoon, and the positions at the extreme left flank was lost to the surviving attackers and nationalists immediately sent reinforcement forward to strengthen their new gain. The commander of the communist 7th Company ordered the 3rd Platoon and the 5th Platoon to counterattack and successfully took back the position by wiping out the enemy in the position, and this left the advancing nationalist reinforce exposed, and as the nationalist withdrew, many of them were cut down by the communist fire. At 4:20 pm, a nationalist platoon had breached the defense of the 3rd Squad of the communist 8th Company, but their further advance was stopped by the stubborn defenders, who managed to damage a nationalist tank by using bazooka and took cover in bomb craters. Losing the armor cover, the attackers were forced to stop while the communist company commander redeployed the 7th Squad to reinforce the 3rd Platoon. The company political commissar personally led the charge of the communist 7th Squad, attacking the nationalist platoon from the right flank of the communist 3rd Squad, completely wiped out the nationalist platoon. This last nationalist attempt signaled the end of the nationalist offensive and by dusk, the nationalist withdrew and the battle ended.

== Outcome ==
The nationalist withdrew from the Phoenix Peak (Feng Huang Ding, 凤凰顶) was part of the larger nationalist general withdraw in Laiyang Campaign due to the worsening situation for the nationalists elsewhere on the battlefields. When the nationalist reinforcement to Laiyang was withdrawn because the need to redeploy elsewhere, not only the nationalists had missed the opportunity to retake the city, but also failed to achieve their objective that was within their grasp: to annihilate the enemy in a decisive battle at the gate of the city by luring them out to fight in the open in situations that favored the nationalists.

== See also ==
- Outline of the Chinese Civil War
- National Revolutionary Army
- History of the People's Liberation Army
