= Battle of Dalushan Islands =

1953 battle

- Part of the Chinese Civil War
Date	29 May 1953
Location	Dalushan Islands
Result	People's Republic of China victory
Territorial changes	People's Republic of China captures the Dalushan Islands

Belligerents
Republic of China (Taiwan)	People's Republic of China

Commanders and leaders
He Zhuoquan (POW)	?

Strength
239 soldiers	450 soldiers

Casualties and losses
53 killed; 186 captured; 2 junks sank	Light casualties

The Battle of Dalushan (Greater Deer Mountain) Islands (大鹿山等岛战斗) took place between the nationalists and the communists for several islands and islets just off the coast of Zhejiang, China during aftermath of the Chinese Civil War in the post-World War II era; it resulted in a communist victory.

On May 29, 1953, a battalion of the 179th regiment of the 60th Division and two companies of the 17th Public Security Division launched their assault on Da Lu Shan Dao (大鹿山岛, "Greater Deer Mountain Island"), Xiao Lu Shan Dao, (小鹿山岛, "Lesser Deer Mountain Island"), Ji Guan Shan Dao (鸡冠山岛, "Rooster’s Crown Mountain Island"), and Yang Yu (羊屿, "Goat Islet") off coast of Zhejiang. At 6:00 PM, People's Liberation Army artillery bombarded Ji Guan Shan Dao and Yang Yu from Zhaitoujiao (寨头角) and Kanmen (坎门) on the mainland. At 7:00 PM, the first assault wave successfully landed on the two islets. Afterward, naval gunboats approached Da Lu Shan Dao and Xiao Lu Shan Dao and bombarded the nationalist positions on the islands. At 9:00 PM, the battle ended with 53 nationalists killed and 186 captured, including the commander of the 42nd Column of the Anti-Communist Assault Army, He Zhuoquan (何卓权). The nationalists also lost two junks, and eight radio sets along with code books.

The communist victory ensured further isolation of the nationalist strongholds along the coast of Zhejiang, such as Dachen Archipelago and Yijiangshan Islands, and another nationalist threat to the communists' coastal sea lines of communication was eliminated. As for the nationalists, these islands and islets were simply too small to station the large number of troops required for any effective defense. They were also too far away from the nearest nationalist strongholds along the coast, so it was impossible to reinforce the local garrison in time.

== See also ==
- Outline of the Chinese Civil War
- Outline of the military history of the People's Republic of China
- National Revolutionary Army
- History of the People's Liberation Army
- Chinese Civil War
