= Hunan-Hubei-Sichuan-Guizhou Soviet =

Area of the Chinese Soviet Republic (1930–1935)

The Hunan–Hubei–Sichuan–Guizhou Soviet, also spelled as the Hunan–Hupeh–Szechuan-Kweichow Soviet (Chinese: 湘鄂川黔苏维埃; pinyin: Xiāng-È-Chuān-Qián Sūwéiāi), was a revolutionary base area and constituent part of the Chinese Soviet Republic (1930–1935).

It was established by the Chinese communist general He Long, who had brought his Second Army Group out from the collapsing Hunan-Western Hubei Soviet. The new Soviet was bolstered in October 1934 by units of the Sixth Army Group (formerly the Eastern Hunan Red Army Independent Division) which had fled the collapsing Hunan-Jiangxi Soviet the previous August. The new soviet's combined force was redesignated the Second Front Red Army, He Long commanding.

The Soviet comprised counties which are located in the modern Chinese autonomous prefectures of Xiangxi Tujia and Miao in Hunan, Enshi Tujia and Miao in Hubei, and the prefecture of Tongren in Guizhou. It also included parts of modern Chongqing, which at that time was part of Sichuan.

== See also ==
- Outline of the Chinese Civil War
