= Chongqing Negotiations =

Negotiations between the Nationalist government and the CCP

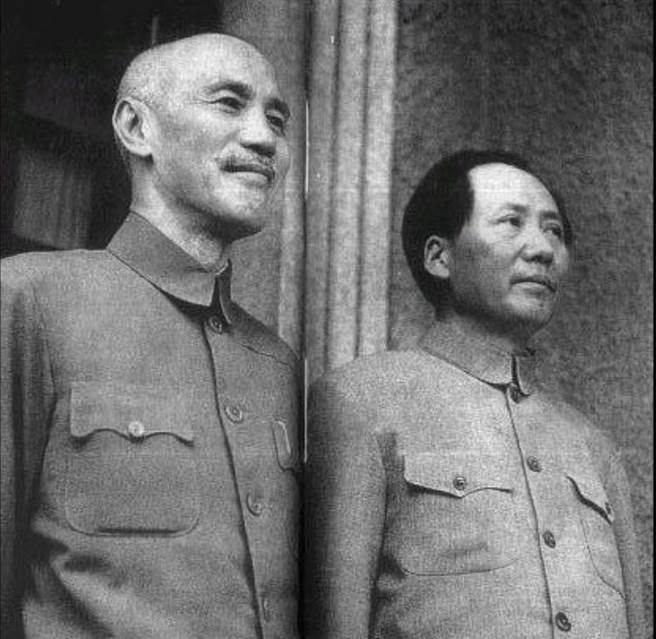
Chiang Kai-shek and Mao Zedong in Chongqing, 1945

The Chongqing Negotiations (Chinese: 重慶談判) were a series of negotiations between the Kuomintang-ruled Nationalist government and the Chinese Communist Party (CCP) from 29 August to 10 October 1945, held in Chongqing, China. The negotiations were highlighted by the final meeting between the leaders of both parties, Chiang Kai-shek and Mao Zedong, which was the first time they had met in 20 years. Most of the negotiations were undertaken by Wang Shijie and Zhou Enlai, representatives of the Nationalist government and CCP, respectively. The negotiations lasted for 43 days, and came to a conclusion after both parties signed the Double Tenth Agreement.

== Background ==
After the end of the First United Front in 1927, the Nationalist government launched several purges of Communists within the Kuomintang. The CCP responded to these purges with several uprisings against the Nationalist government. Chiang then retaliated with the Encirclement Campaigns aimed to search and destroy the Chinese Red Army across China throughout the first half of the 1930s. The two sides came to a ceasefire after the Xi'an Incident in December 1936, where the Nationalists and the Communists agreed to form a united front once again to counter Japanese military aggression.

== Negotiations ==
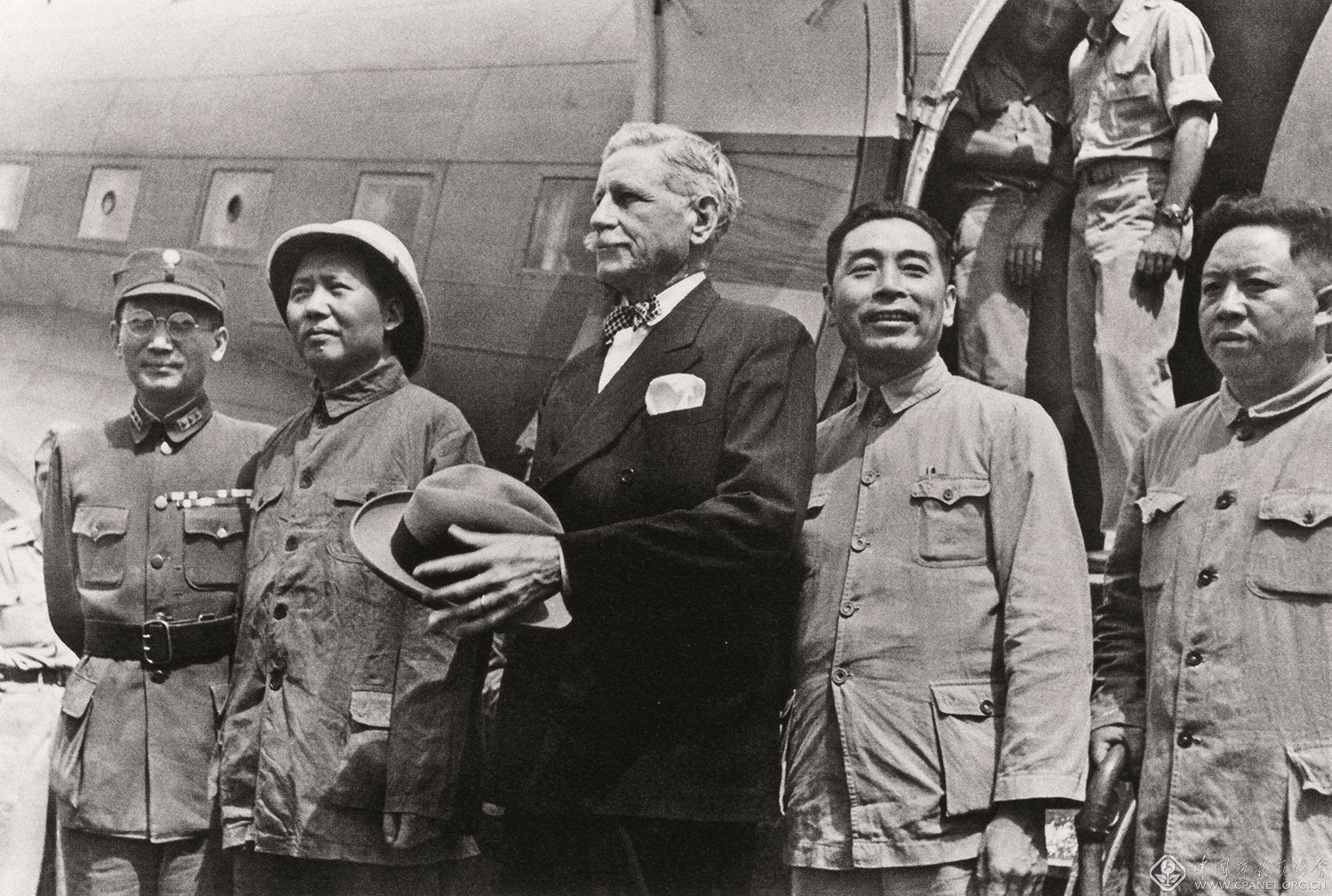
Before the departure from Yan'an. From left: Zhang Zhizhong, Mao Zedong, Patrick J. Hurley, Zhou Enlai, Wang Ruofei

In August 1945, Mao and Zhou flew from Yan'an to the Chinese wartime capital of Chongqing to discuss the relationship between the CCP and the KMT in the aftermath of the Second Sino-Japanese War. The Soviet Union were receptive to the idea of another united front between the Nationalists and the Communists, as Stalin told the Chinese Communists that it was their "best hope for the future". Accompanied by American ambassador Patrick J. Hurley, Mao joined Chiang for dinner on 27 August, which was the first time these two leaders had met in 20 years. It would also be their last meeting. After seven weeks of negotiations, the two sides agreed on the common goal to eventually establish a political democracy in China, and to place all Chinese armed forces under the command of Chiang.

== Result ==
Throughout the negotiations, armed struggles between the two parties continued to escalate as the CCP were under attack both north and south of the Yangtze. Mao returned to Yan'an on 11 October, and a joint statement was issued by the CCP and the KMT to outline the result of the negotiations, which is now known as the Double Tenth Agreement. In this agreement, the CCP and the KMT mutually recognized each other, as the two parties planned to form a coalition government. The aim of the agreement was to avoid another civil war.

The Nationalist government was unwilling to recognize the areas under control by the CCP. Chiang was unconvinced by the joint statement, and came to realize that a military solution was necessary. Mao described the statement as "a mere scrap of paper", and expressed to the Soviet Union that the civil war was "virtually inevitable". By November 1945, it was clear that the agreement was going to be short-lived, and the full-scale civil war soon resumed in 1946.

== See also ==
- Outline of the Chinese Civil War
