= Zhiluozhen Campaign =

- Part of the Chinese Civil War
Date	November 20–23, 1935
Location	Zhiluozhen, Fu County, Shaanxi Province
Result	Communist victory

Belligerents
Chinese Workers' and Peasants' Red Army	Republic of China National Revolutionary Army

Casualties and losses
800 killed and wounded	1,000 killed and wounded; 5,300 captured

Zhiluozhen Campaign (Chinese: 直罗镇战役) was fought in Shaanxi on November 20–23, 1935 between the forces of the Chinese Communist Party and the Northeast Army nominally under the control of the Kuomintang Nationalist Government led by warlord Zhang Xueliang. With minimal casualties, the communists captured over 5,000 prisoners; 3,500 rifles; 176 machine guns; 8 pieces of artillery and 300 horses.

== See also ==
- Outline of the Chinese Civil War
