= Jingshan–Zhongxiang Campaign =

1947 military campaign

Jingshan – Zhongxiang Campaign
- Part of Chinese Civil War
Date	December 20, 1947 – June 1948
Location	Hubei, China
Result	Communist victory

Belligerents
Flag of the National Revolutionary Army National Revolutionary Army	PLA People's Liberation Army

Commanders and leaders
unknown	Zhang Caiqian

Strength
1 Division	1 Independent Brigade

Casualties and losses
1,000+	Unknown

The Jingshan–Zhongxiang Campaign was a half-year-long struggle in Hubei between the nationalists and the communists for the control of Jingshan and Zhongxiang regions during the Chinese Civil War; it resulted in communist victory.

In the second half of 1947, Liu Bocheng, Deng Xiaoping and Li Xiannian decided to reestablish Jianghan (江汉) Military Region by combining the communist 5th Division from southern Shaanxi and the communist force in western Hubei in the Dabie Mountains, and Zhao Jimei (赵基梅) was named as the first commander. On December 14, 1947, under the new commander Zhang Caiqian (张才千), the communist force crossed the Beijing–Hankou railroad to strengthen their positions, and on December 20, 1947, the 1st Regiment of the communist Independent brigade launched its assault on Jingshan. Faced with overwhelming enemy force, the security battalion guarding the city retreated without a fight, but in the haste of retreat, the nationalists failed to destroy abundant provisions stocked in the city, and thus provided the enemy with great resources, which proved to be fatal for the nationalists in the subsequent battles in the region.

At 3:00 AM on December 22, 1947, the communists concentrated their forces by gathering three regiments to start their march toward Zhongxiang. The nationalist force was scattered to defend other isolated positions and thus was not able to regroup and reinforce the Zhongxiang, which was defended by a single regiment. After an hour of fierce battle, all of the nationalist positions in the outskirt of the city fell and being cut off by the attack enemy, the surviving defenders of these positions were forced to retreat to other directions instead of back into the city.

After witnessing the annihilation of the defenders outside the city wall, the defenders inside the city wall attempted to break out via the south gate, but they were beaten back into the city. At 4:00 PM, the final assault on the city began under the cover of shelling of the nationalist positions from several dozen artillery pieces and fire from over 90 machine guns. The defenders were completely suppressed and the attacking enemy was able to breach the city wall at places of White Tiger Hall (Bai Hu Tang, 白虎堂) and Fuying Hall (Fu Yin Hall, 福音堂). The enemy assault team was able to subsequently breach the defense at the Great East Gate of the city wall, enabling the main force of the attacking enemy to enter the city via the gap. After several hours of brave and desperate but futile street fighting put up by the nationalists, the defenders were completely wiped out by the enemy before dusk. The communists gathered 367 cadavers of the nationalist defenders in the battle to take Zhongxiang.

After the battle, the communists abandoned the city on December 25, 1947, according to the plan, and retreated to countryside with abundant provisions captured. The nationalists returned to the empty city on December 29, 1947, but the city was looted clean by the enemy, thus severely limiting the nationalist capabilities for any future operations. In contrary, the communists used the abundant supplies captured to boost their strength and solidify their gains in the rural regions surrounding the city, and it was only a matter of time before they retake the city. The nationalists forced on the defensive were incapable of stopping the enemy and in June, 1948, Zhongxiang fell for the second time, and this time for good, with the nationalists being permanently driven out.

The communist victory was rooted in the correct strategy of controlling the rural regions surrounding the cities first, and then taking the cities with isolated enemy garrisons. The nationalists, in contrast, avoided heavy loss in the initial stage by not engaging the overwhelmingly strong enemy, but in doing so, allowed the enemy to loot important provisions in great quantity when they failed to destroy any provisions in retreats. As a result, the numerically superior nationalist force was not able to sustain themselves for any prolonged operations outside the city walls due to insufficient supply, and was thus gradually reduced in numbers in many small but consecutive engagements as the well supplied enemy attacked.

== See also ==
- Outline of the Chinese Civil War
- National Revolutionary Army
- History of the People's Liberation Army
