= Battle of Tang'erli =

1947 battle

- Part of the Chinese Civil War
Date	April 27, 1947 – April 28, 1947
Location	Hebei, China
Result	Communist victory

Belligerents
National Revolutionary Army	PLA People's Liberation Army

Commanders and leaders
Unknown	Xiao Xinhuai

Strength
950+	2,200

Casualties and losses
270+ killed 670+ captured	~100

The Battle of Tang'erli (堂二里战斗) was a series of armed conflicts fought between the nationalists and the communists during Chinese Civil War in the post World War II era, and resulted in the communist victory.

On 27 April 1947, the Communist Central Hebei Independent 7th Brigade secretly approached Tang'erli (堂二里) region from the western part of Ba (霸) county for a sneak attack. The 19th Regiment of the 7th Brigade was assigned to the south of Tang'erli (堂二里) to stop Nationalist reinforcements from Tianjin and Shengfang (胜芳), deployed in the regions including Wang Family's Bunker (Wang Jia Bao, 王家堡), Southern Willow (Nan Liu, 南柳), He Family's Bunker (He Jia Bao, 何家堡), Chu River Harbor (Chu He Gang, 褚河港), and Donggu Gang (东沽港). Meanwhile, the 20th Regiment of the valiant 7th Brigade was deployed to the north of Tang'erli (堂二里), and the 21st Regiment of the 7th Brigade was deployed to the east and west of Tang'erli (堂二里).

As the Communist siege was complete, the inevitable assault begun. The undetected sudden attack took the defenders completely by surprise, and by 11:00 a.m. in the next morning, the commanding height Rong Family's Tower (Rong Jia Lou, 荣家楼) had fallen into the enemy's hand. As a result, the Nationalist headquarters was completely exposed under enemy fire, and the defenders held out as long as they could but eventually were forced to surrender when reinforcements failed to arrive and breakout was impossible.

The Communists succeeded in taking over 670 prisoners and killing over 270, including most of the nationalist officers. The communists also succeeded in capturing 22 light machineguns, 4 submachine guns, over 30 handguns, over 450 rifles, over 20,000 rounds of ammunitions, and other supplies. The nationalist loss of Tang'erli (堂二里), one of their strongholds near the major city Tianjin meant that the enemy would have another base from which they would launch attacks to harass the nationalists guarding the major city.

== See also ==
- Outline of the Chinese Civil War
- National Revolutionary Army
- History of the People's Liberation Army
