= Campaign to the North of Daqing River =

1947 military campaign

- Part of the Chinese Civil War
| Date | September 2, 1947 – September 12, 1947 |
| Location | Hebei, China |
| Result | Stalemate |

Belligerents
| Flag of the National Revolutionary Army National Revolutionary Army | PLA People's Liberation Army |

Commanders and leaders
| Fu Zuoyi | Nie Rongzhen |

Strength
| 43,000 | 62,000 |

Casualties and losses
| 5,200 | Unknown |

The Campaign to the North of Daqing River was a series of battles fought between the nationalists and the communists in Hebei, China during the Chinese Civil War in the post-World War II era.

== Prelude ==
In July 1947, the nationalists in Northern China launched an offensive to eradicate communists in the local regions and stationed troops in the towns and cities of the newly conquered regions for a garrison. The communists, in turn, attempted to retake the lost region by attempting to annihilate the nationalist force and dislodge the surviving nationalists from their new posts.

== Order of battle ==
Nationalist order of battle:

- The 94th Army
- The 4th Division of the 13th Army
- The 22nd Division of the 16th Army
- The 94th Division
- The Independent 95th Brigade
- A security regiment

Communist order of battle:

- The 2nd Column of the communist Shanxi-Chahar-Hebei Field Army
- The 3rd Column of the communist Shanxi-Chahar-Hebei Field Army
- The 4th Column of the communist Shanxi-Chahar-Hebei Field Army
- The Independent 7th Brigade of the communist Central Hebei Military Region

== The Campaign ==
On the night of September 2, 1947, the communist 3rd Column took the town of Xushui (徐水), inflicting heavy casualties on the nationalist Independent 95th Brigade in the surprise attack, and forcing the defenders to abandon the town to regroup. After the initial success, the communists played the same trick again, this time targeting Laishui (涞水). This time, the nationalist garrison of the 5th Division of the 94th Army became the victim and was forced to abandon the city after suffering heavy loss in a fierce battle that lasted from September 6, 1947, to September 8, 1947. The three divisions of the nationalist 94th Army, the 5th Division, the 43rd Division and the 121st Division each sent out a regiment to reinforce the defenders at Laishui (涞水), while the 4th Division of the nationalist 13th Army and the 22nd Division of the nationalist 16th Army were mobilized for reinforcement by railway transportation. Although the nationalist response to sending out reinforcement was swift, the reinforcement was extremely slow in reaching their destination because major sections of the railway from Solid City (Gu Cheng, 固城) to Baoding, the important transportation the nationalists depended on, was destroyed by the enemy units from the communist 5th and 9th sub-Military Regions. As a result, before the nationalists reaching their destination, the communist 3rd Column had plenty of time transferring a lot of supplies captured at Laishui (涞水) to other communist bases and then turning toward Liang (良) County, Fangshan, and Zhuo (涿) County to further strike and harass Nationalist garrisons in these regions by the night of September 9, 1947.

While the nationalist reinforcement was out, the communist 2nd Column and the 4th Column attempted to annihilate the isolated nationalist 94th Division. On September 10, 1947, the communist 2nd Column threatened a brigade and a regiment of the nationalist 109th Division at Ban Family's Nest (Ban Jia Wo, 板家窝), after wiping out the nationalist battalion stationed at Wu Family's Stage (Wu Jia Tai, 吴家台). The Independent 7th Brigade of the communist Central Hebei Military Region had taken most of the town of Ba (霸) County after badly mauling the loca nationalist garrison consisted of a nationalist security regiment and a regiment of the nationalist 22nd Division, forcing the surviving defenders into the isolated region of Northern Pass (Bei Guan, 北关) of the town. At Open Mouth Village (Kai Ko Cun, 开口村), units from the communist 10 sub-Military Region forced the defenders consisted of a regiment of the nationalist 94th Division to give up most of the area and withdrew into three large bunker complexes. However, communists failed to annihilate the nationalist's forces at Jiu Hill (Jiu Gang, 咎岗) consisted of a brigade and two regiments after the communist 4th Column was beaten back twice in their attacks on the besieged nationalists. On September 12, 1947, the 4th Division of the nationalist 13th Army, the 22nd Division of the 16th Army, the nationalist Independent 95th Brigade, and the nationalist 157th Brigade went out to reinforce their besieged comrades-in-arms and learning the news, the communists withdrew, and the campaigned ended in stalemate.

== Outcome ==
The result of this campaign was indecisive because neither side had achieved their original objective completely. For the communists, they had succeeded in forcing the nationalists to end their communist eradication offensive early and retreated to the urban centers; they had failed to achieve their original goal of annihilating the nationalist 94th Division. For the nationalists, they were successful in avoiding annihilation and beaten back enemy attacks on urban centers, but their communist eradication campaign was forced to end early with vast newly conquered rural areas falling back into the enemy hands. The campaign, therefore, can be described as a stalemate.

== See also ==
- Outline of the Chinese Civil War
- National Revolutionary Army
- History of the People's Liberation Army
- Chinese Civil War
