= Battle of Bamianshan =

1950 Chinese Civil War battle

Coordinates: 28.86271°N 109.26035°E

- Part of Chinese Civil War
Date	January 19–31, 1950
Location	Hunan, China
Result	Communist victory

Belligerents
Republic of China	(China) Chinese Communist Party

Commanders and leaders
(Taiwan) Chen Zixian (Taiwan) Shi Xingzhou	(China) Unknown

Strength
4,000	7,000

Casualties and losses
3,000	Minor

The Battle of Bamianshan (八面山战斗) took place between the Nationalists and the Communists during the Chinese Civil War in the post-World War II era and resulted in communist victory.

Order of battle:

- Nationalists: Temporarily Organized 1st Army (4,000+)
- Communists: 141st Division of the communist 47th Army (7000+)

Bamianshan (八面山), meaning Eight Sided Mountain literally, is located 10 km to the north of the town of Liye (里耶) in the border region of Hunan, Sichuan and Hubei. The difficult terrain made it ideal as a hideout for bandits, who had plagued the local region for more than a century. By the end of 1949 the bandits were led by Shi Xingzhou (师兴周). In late December 1949 the Nationalist Temporarily Organized 1st Army led by its commander Chen Zixian (陈子贤) withdrew to the mountains and convinced the local bandits to join them, fighting the communists together. The Nationalists planned to use the mountain as a guerilla base to launch operations against their Communist enemy.

In mid-January 1950 the 141st Division of the communist 47th Army was tasked with the extermination of the Nationalist guerrillas and the division began its intensive training in mountain warfare. Two regiments of the 141st Division of the 47th Army were deployed in the regions of Neixipeng (内夕棚), Greater Rocky Gate (Dayanmen, 小岩门) and Lesser Rocky Gate (Xiaoyanmen, 小岩门), thus completing the encirclement of the Eight Sided Mountain (Bamianshan, 八面山).

The battle erupted on January 19, 1950, when a detachment of Communist troops secretly climbed up the southern cliff of the mountain and dispersed the Nationalist guerrillas in a surprise attack. The defenders were overwhelmed by the rapid and decisive surprise attack and were completely demoralized; they abandoned their posts and began to flee. The commanders were unable to rally their troops for an effective counterattack and the guerrilla headquarters located in the Swallow Cave (Yanzidong, 燕子洞) fell, with a huge amount of weapons captured by the attacking enemy. After the main engagement the Communists began to eradicate the surviving Nationalist guerrillas by fighting in small teams, and by the end of January 1950 the battle concluded with over 3,000 Nationalist guerrillas killed or captured. The Nationalist plan of long-term guerrilla and insurgency warfare had been crushed.

The Communist victory, however, was incomplete: around 1,000 Nationalist guerrilla fighters successfully escaped to fight for another day at different locations, including their commander Chen Zixian (陈子贤). Most of the escaped Nationalist guerrillas retreated to Sichuan.

== See also ==
- Outline of the Chinese Civil War
- Outline of the military history of the People's Republic of China
- National Revolutionary Army
- History of the People's Liberation Army
