= Campaign to the South of Baoding =

- Part of Chinese Civil War
Date	January 21, 1947 – January 28, 1947
Location	Hebei, China
Result	Communist victory

Belligerents
Flag of the National Revolutionary Army National Revolutionary Army	PLA Chinese Red Army

Commanders and leaders
Unknown	Chen Zhengxiang; Hu Yaobang

Strength
20,000	45,000

Casualties and losses
8,000+	Unknown

The Campaign to the South of Baoding consisted of several battles fought in regions south of Baoding between the nationalists and the communists during the Chinese Civil War after World War II, and resulted in the communist victory.

== Prelude ==
In December 1946, after the failed attempts to take Easy County (Yi Xian, 易县) and Full City (Man Cheng, 满城) regions, the Nationalists redeployed their forces along the railroad from Beijing to Baoding to fragment the enemy base into smaller pieces. However, when carrying out the new strategy, the Nationalist force was overstretched and the region between Wangdu (望都) and Zhengding to the south of Baoding was thinly manned: the vast area of over 200 km was only guarded by a detachment of the 32nd Division of the Nationalist 3rd Army and four regiments of the Nationalist 5th Security Division, totaling 20,000 troops. The Communists decided to use this advantage to launch a campaign aimed at severing the Nationalist communication / transportation line in central Hebei, thus cutting off the food supply for the Nationalists in western Hebei.

== Order of battle ==
Nationalist order of battle:

- The 3rd Army
  - The 32nd Division
- The 5th Security Division

Communist order of battle:

- The 2nd Column
- The 4th Column
- The Independent 1st Brigade
- The Independent 8th Brigade

== The Campaign ==
The Communist 10th Brigade, the 11th Brigade, the Independent 1st Brigade and units of the 3rd and 9th Military Districts were tasked with the main responsibilities of the campaign, while the 8th Independent Brigade would launch assaults along the railroad around Gaobei Hotel (Gao Bei Dian, 高碑店) region to the north of Baoding to tie down the Nationalists in order to prevent them from reinforcing their forces in the south. The Communist 2nd and 3rd Column would be based at the town of Sun City (Yang Cheng Zhen 阳城镇) and White Bunker Town (Bai Bao Zhen, 白堡镇), waiting to ambush the Nationalist reinforcements if there was any.

At dawn on January 21, 1947, under the cover of a heavy snowstorm, the Communist 10th Brigade and the 11th Brigade launched surprise attacks on the Imperial Capital Village (王京村) and the town of Wangdu (望都), successfully taking both Nationalist strongholds and completely annihilating the Nationalist garrison consisting of a battalion and a regiment of the Nationalist 5th Security Division in the process. Meanwhile, Communist 1st Independent Brigade and units from the 3rd and the 9th Military Districts launched their offensives on Nationalist positions along the railroad. On the night of January 21 the Communist 4th Column succeeded in penetrating into the region between the towns of Xinle (新乐) and Ding County. On January 23 the Communist 4th Column launched a successful effort to take the region of Camp West Hotel (Zhai Xi Dian, 寨西 店), while the bulk of its force was deployed along the railroad to ambush any Nationalist reinforcements. On January 24 Nationalist reinforcements from Zhengding, consisting of a regiment of the 5th Security Division and a portion of the 32nd Division, was completely wiped out by the waiting Communist 4th Column in the region of Shijiading (十家町). Learning the news of the disaster, the Nationalist defenders of the town of Xinle (新乐) were forced to abandon their position when the Communist 1st Independent Brigade attacked. On January 28 the Communist 4th Column launched the final assault on the besieged town of Ding County, badly mauling the Nationalist brigade defending the town. As the Nationalist survivors attempted to flee, they were ambushed by the Communist 2nd Column at Wangdu (望都) region; this complete victory concluded the campaign.

== Outcome ==
The Nationalists suffered more than 8,000 casualties in their defeat, and the link between Shijiazhuang and Baoding was severed. Additionally, towns including Wangdu (望都), Ding (定) County and Xinle (新乐) fell into enemy hands, while the previously separated Communist bases in central Hebei and the border area of Hebei and Shanxi were successfully linked up by the enemy to form a new base of much larger size.

== See also ==
- Outline of the Chinese Civil War
- National Revolutionary Army
- History of the People's Liberation Army
- Chinese Civil War
