= Weixian–Guangling–Nuanquan Campaign =

1945 military campaign

Weixian-Guangling-Nuanquan Campaign
- Part of the Chinese Civil War
Date	September 29, 1945 – November 2, 1945
Location	Chahar (province) and Shanxi, China
Result	Communist victory

Belligerents
National Revolutionary Army	Chinese Red Army

Commanders and leaders
unknown	unknown

Strength
3,000	2,500

Casualties and losses
3,000	Minor

The Weixian–Guangling–Nuanquan Campaign (蔚广暖战役) was a campaign fought in Wei (蔚) County and Warm Spring (Nuanquan 暖泉) of Chahar (province) and Guanling (广灵) of Shanxi, and it was a clash between the communists and the nationalists after World War II. The battle was one of the Chinese Civil War in the immediate post World War II era, and resulted in communist victory. This campaign was part of the General Counteroffensive in Shanxi-Chahar (province)-Hebei.

== Campaign ==
In September, 1945, the communist decided to take Wei (蔚) County and Warm Spring (Nuanquan 暖泉) in Chahar (province) and Guanling (广灵) in Shanxi by force after the local defenders consisted of former nationalists after World War II refused to surrender. The 12th Brigade of the communist Central Hebei Column was tasked with this job, and its 34th Regiment would take Warm Spring (Nuanquan 暖泉) of Chahar (province), its 35th Regiment would take Wei (蔚) County of Chahar (province) with the help of a battalion of its 36th Regiment, and the remaining two battalions would take Guanling (广灵) of Shanxi. At the dusk of September 29, 1945, all communist units suddenly besieged their targets and surprised the defenders.

The 34th Regiment of the 12th Brigade of the communist Central Hebei Column launched its assault against its target at dusk and annihilated most of the defenders in the fierce street fights. The surviving defenders were annihilated in the ambush as they attempted to escape. On September 30, 1945, the 36th Regiment of the 12th Brigade of the communist Central Hebei Column took the important position of Four Passes (Siguan, 四关) of Guanling (广灵) in Shanxi, but their subsequent attacks on the town itself via ladders were beaten back by the defenders on October 6, 1945. The communists changed their tactic by digging tunnels and the 34th Regiment of the 12th Brigade of the communist Central Hebei Column was redeployed to reinforce their comrades on October 26, 1945. At 10:00 PM on October 26, 1945, the general assault on the town begun and after three hours of fierce fight, the entire garrison of defenders was completely annihilated.

Meanwhile, the attack on Wei (蔚) County in Chahar (province) by the 35th Regiment of the 12th Brigade of the communist Central Hebei Column was successfully beaten back on October 1, 1945. The 34th Regiment of the 12th Brigade of the communist Central Hebei Column was redeployed to attack Wei (蔚) County in Chahar (province) but its attack was also successfully beaten back by the defenders on October 6, 1945. Communists responded by adding an artillery company to the attacking force and on November 2, 1945, they finally succeeded in breaching the defense at the western gate and southern gate. After five hours of fierce street fight, the defenders were annihilated, with only around 30 were able to escape the onslaught. The communist victory of this campaign resulted in inflicting over 3,000 casualties over their enemy, capturing more than 40 machine guns and over 1,000 firearms.

== See also ==
- Outline of the Chinese Civil War
- National Revolutionary Army
- History of the People's Liberation Army
