= Encirclement campaign against the Hunan-Hubei-Sichuan-Guizhou Soviet =

1935 military campaign

Encirclement campaign against Hunan-Hubei-Sichuan-Guizhou Soviet
- Part of the Chinese Civil War
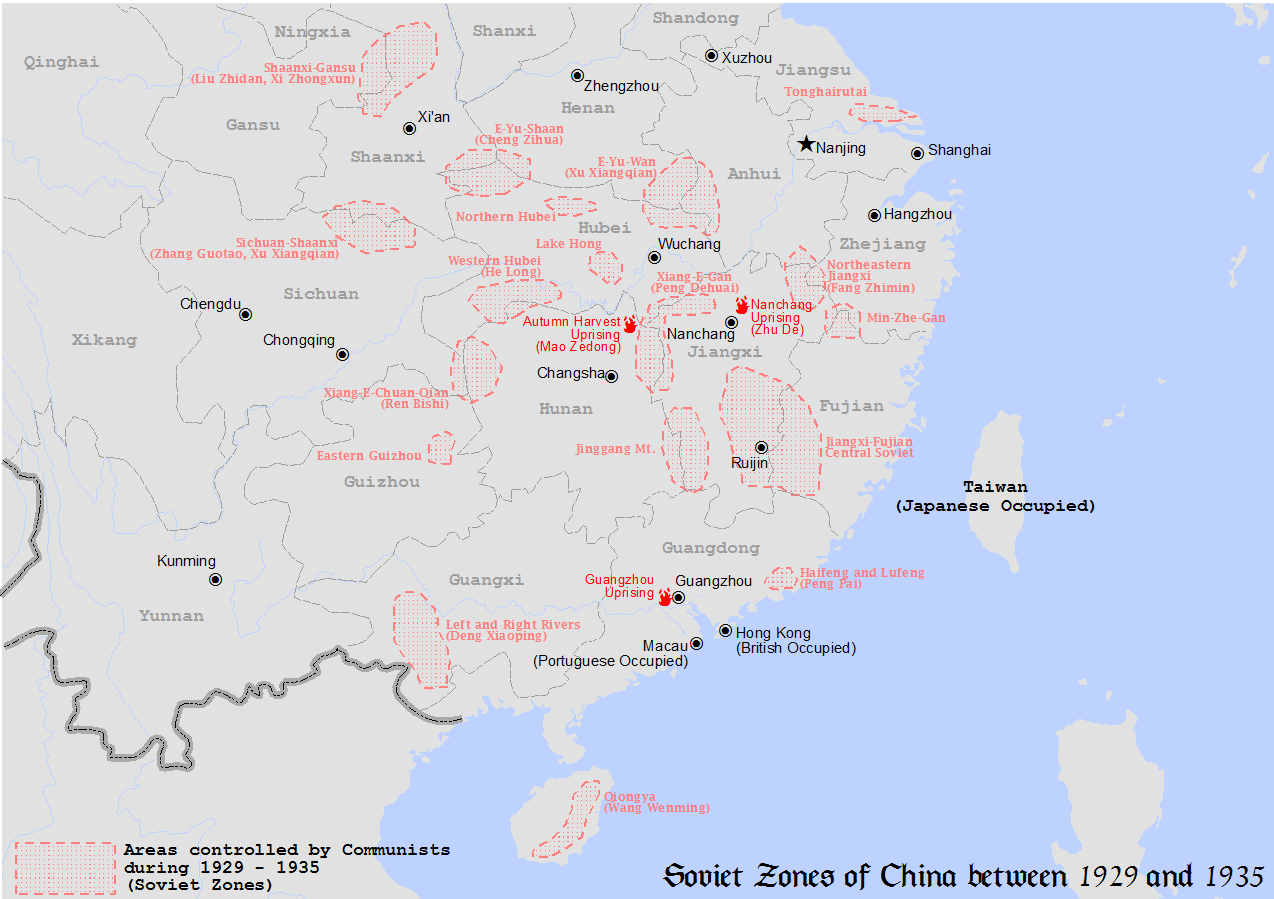
- Location of the Hunan-Hubei-Sichuan-Guizhou (Xiang-E-Chuan-Qian) Soviet
Date	February, 1935 – August, 1935
Location	border region of Hunan-Hubei-Sichuan-Guizhou, China
Result	Communist victory

Belligerents
Nationalist China	Chinese Red Army

Commanders and leaders
Chiang Kai-shek	He Long

Strength
100,000	12,000

Casualties and losses
17,000	?

The encirclement campaign against Hunan-Hubei-Sichuan-Guizhou Soviet was a series of battles launched by the Chinese Nationalist Government that was intended to destroy communist Hunan-Hubei-Sichuan-Guizhou Soviet and its Chinese Red Army in the local region. It was responded by the Communists' Counter-encirclement campaign at Hunan-Hubei-Sichuan-Guizhou Soviet (Chinese: 湘鄂川黔苏区反围剿), also called by the communists as the Counter-encirclement campaign at Hunan-Hubei-Sichuan-Guizhou Revolutionary Base (Chinese: 湘鄂川黔革命根据地反围剿), in which the local Chinese Red Army successfully defended their soviet republic in the southern Jiangxi province against the Nationalist attacks from February, 1935 to August, 1935.

== See also ==
- Outline of the Chinese Civil War
- National Revolutionary Army
- History of the People's Liberation Army
- Chinese Civil War
