= Battle of Guanzhong (1946–1947) =

1946 battle during the Chinese Civil War

- Part of Chinese Civil War
Date	December 31, 1946 – January 30, 1947
Location	Guanzhong, China
Result	Communist victory

Belligerents
Republic of China	Chinese Communist Party

Commanders and leaders
Hu Zongnan	Peng Dehuai

Strength
8,100	3,700

Casualties and losses
1,500	Unknown

The Battle of Guanzhong (关中战斗) was fought between the nationalists and the Chinese Communist Party (CCP) during the Chinese Civil War in the post-World War II era and resulted in CCP victory.

In the southern front of the nationalist dominated region bordering the revolutionary base area in Shaanxi – Gansu – Ningxia, the CCP controlled region in Guanzhong had formed a bulge that the nationalists had long planned to eliminate. The communist base in Guanzhong posed a serious threat to both Guanzhong and eastern Gansu, and also threatened the flank of the nationalist force in their planned attack on the communist capital, Yan'an. Nationalists had a total of two divisions, totaling six brigades in the region and decided to eliminate the communist base in Guanzhong first.

== Order of battle ==
- Nationalist (8,100 total)
  - 48th Brigade of the Reorganized 17th Division
  - 123rd Brigade of the Reorganized 36th Division
  - 135th Brigade of the Reorganized 15th Division
  - Two security regiments
- Communist (3,700 total)
  - Newly Organized 4th Brigade
  - 3rd Regiment of the 1st Garrison Brigade
  - 7th Regiment of the 3rd Garrison Brigade

On December 31, 1946, nationalist forces consisting of the 48th Brigade of the Reorganized 17th Division, the 123rd Brigade of the Reorganized 36th Division, the 135th Brigade of the Reorganized 15th Division and two security regiments launched their offensive against the communist base in Guanzhong, succeeding in taking regions including Xipodian (西坡店), Gongjiaxie (巩家斜), Changshetou (长舌头), and Wuwangshan (武王山). The communists, in response, decided to counterattack with their Newly Organized 4th Brigade, the 3rd Regiment of the 1st Garrison Brigade and the 7th Regiment of the 3rd Garrison Brigade.

On January 17, 1947, the 3rd Regiment of the communist 1st Garrison Brigade took the town of Yunyi (旬邑), badly mauling the nationalist defenders in the process. The 143rd Regiment of the 48th Brigade of the nationalist Reorganized 17th Division was immediately dispatched to retake the town, but the communists had already abandoned the town and retreated with the captured supplies. Replenished with the newly captured supplies from the nationalists, the 3rd Regiment of the communist 1st Garrison Brigade and the communist Newly Organized 4th Brigade launched another round of assaults on nationalist positions aimed to neutralize the nationalist blockade line. On January 26, 1947, nationalist forts including Liangzhuang (梁庄), Huangpu (黄甫), Baizitou (白子头), Jinchi (金池), and Longao (龙高) fell into enemy hands and over 35 km of nationalist blockade line on the enemy were neutralized by their communist enemy.

The nationalists planned a counterattack in order to restore the blockade. The 368th Regiment of the 123rd Brigade of the nationalist Reorganized 36th Division at Chunhua (淳化) and the 143rd Regiment of the 48th Brigade of the nationalist Reorganized 17th Division retook Yunyi (旬邑) were order to attack the enemy in a pincer movement. On January 29, 1947, the 368th Regiment of the 123rd Brigade of the nationalist Reorganized 36th Division reached the region of Tongrun (通润), while the 143rd Regiment of the 48th Brigade of the nationalist Reorganized 17th Division reached the regions of Jinchi (金池), and Longao (龙高).

The communists decided to concentrate their force to annihilate the 368th Regiment of the 123rd Brigade of the nationalist Reorganized 36th Division near the region of Liangzhuang (梁庄), and the 7th Regiment of the communist 3rd Garrison Brigade was tasked to lure the intended nationalist victim into the trap from the region of Weijia (魏家). The 771st Regiment of the communist Newly Organized 4th Brigade was asked to outflank the intended nationalist victim and to seal off the escaping route of the nationalists. The 16th Regiment of the communist Newly Organized 4th Brigade would fight a blocking action at Huangpu (黄甫), and Yaoli (腰里) regions to prevent the 143rd Regiment of the 48th Brigade of the nationalist Reorganized 17th Division from reinforcing the intended nationalist victim.

On January 30, 1947, the nationalists renewed their attack on their communist enemy, but the advanced of the 143rd Regiment of the 48th Brigade of the nationalist Reorganized 17th Division were checked by the enemy at Huangpu (黄甫), and Yaoli (腰里) regions just as the communists had planned. After successfully taking the region of Weijia (魏家) in a pincer movement, the 368th Regiment of the 123rd Brigade of the nationalist Reorganized 36th Division continued their push toward the Liangzhuang (梁庄). The 7th Regiment of the communist 3rd Garrison Brigade lured the 368 Regiment of the 123rd Brigade of the nationalist Reorganized 36th Division near Liangzhuang (梁庄), with the 771st Regiment of the communist Newly Organized 4th Brigade outflanking the nationalist regiment, which was consequently besieged in the communist trap between the region of Ningjia (宁家) and Liangzhuang (梁庄). After a fierce battle, the besieged nationalist force was completely annihilated, suffering over 930 fatalities, and this nationalist defeat marked the end of the battle of Guanzhong.

Although the communists had managed to score a victory over their nationalist adversaries and managed to keep their base in Guanzhong for the time being, it would not be long before they were forced to give it up once the nationalists were able to muster enough strength later on. The communists simply did not have the numbers necessary to defend the area. The nationalist defeat was only a temporary setback which caused the delay of their original plan to take the communist capital.

== See also ==
- Outline of the Chinese Civil War
- National Revolutionary Army
- History of the People's Liberation Army
