= Campaign to the North of Nanchuan County =

1949 military campaign

- Part of the Chinese Civil War
Date	November 1, 1949 – November 28, 1949
Location	Sichuan, China
Result	Communist victory

Belligerents
Flag of the National Revolutionary Army National Revolutionary Army	PLA People's Liberation Army

Commanders and leaders
Flag of the ROC Chiang Kai-shek; Hu Zongnan	Flag of the PRC Liu Bocheng; Deng Xiaoping

Strength
180,000	140,000

Casualties and losses
30,000	?

The Campaign to the North of Nanchuan County, Sichuan, was part of the Campaign in Southwestern China launched by the communists against the nationalists in the region to the north of Nanchuan (南川) County during the Chinese Civil War in the post World War II era, and resulted in communist victory.

== Order of battle ==
Defenders: nationalist order of battle:

- The XIV Corps
- The XV Corps
- The XX Corps

Attackers: communist order of battle:

- The III Corps of the Second Field Army under Chen Xilian (commander) and Zhang Linzhi (political commissar)
- The V Corps of the Second Field Army under Yang Yong (commander) and Su Zhenhua (political commissar)
- The 47th Army of the Fourth Field Army under Cao Lihuai (commander) and Zhou Chiping (political commissar)

== Campaign ==
The Campaign to the North of Nanchuan (南川) County begun on November 1, 1949, when the communists launched the Campaign in Southwestern China in multiple fronts against their nationalist adversary. By mid November 1949, one of the communist attacks on the nationalist XIV Corps and XX Corps had succeeded in breaching the nationalist defense on both flanks, resulting in Youyang (酉阳), Xiushan and Enshi falling into the enemy hands. By November 21, 1949, 4 divisions of the nationalist XIV Corps in the regions to the east of Salty Abundance (Xian Feng, 咸丰) in Hubei were completely annihilated by the enemy. The remaining nationalists was forced to retreat westward by crossing the Black River (Wu Jiang, 乌江). The communist III Corps and the 47th Army then turned their attention to the nationalist XV Corps and the XX Corps retreated to the region north of Nanchuan (南川) County by respectively crossing the Black River (Wu Jiang, 乌江) at regions including Gong's Beaches (Gong Tan, 龚滩), White Horse (Bai Ma, 白马), Tukan (土坎), and north of Peng's Waters (Peng Shui, 彭水). The major escape route to Qijiang (綦江) in the west for the nationalists were severed.

Chiang Kai-shek in Chongqing had realized the enemy's intention of besieging Chengdu and Chongqing by striking behind the nationalist line from western Hunan and western Hubei via Sichuan and Guizhou, and thus immediately ordered Hu Zongnan to conclude Qinling Campaign by withdrawing from the Qinling defensive line, and enter Sichuan from Qinling and Greater Ba Mountain (Da Ba Shan, 大巴山) to avoid being isolated and surrounded by the enemy. The nationalist XV Corps and the XX Corps were redeployed to strengthen the defense of Nanchuan (南川) county and the region to its east to secure the retreat of Hu Zongnan's troops. To counter the nationalist move, Liu Bocheng and Deng Xiaoping ordered the communist V Corps and the 10th Army to push toward Luzhou and Yibin from southwestern Guizhou, while the communist III Corps and the 47th Army to cross the Black River (Wu Jiang, 乌江) to push toward Nanchuan (南川) county and help other communist forces to besiege and annihilate the nationalist XV Corps and XX Corps. By November 28, 1949, the communist forces had fulfilled their tasks by badly mauling the two nationalist corpses in the region to the north of the county, thus successfully concluded the Campaign to the North of Nanchuan (南川) County.

== Outcome ==
This campaign was a part of the Campaign in Southwestern China, and the nationalists were defeated, losing around 30,000 in the process. The nationalist termination of the Qinling Campaign by withdrawing Hu Zongnan's troops from Qinling defensive line meant that the nationalists had lost a natural geographical barrier in the northern front, while the southeastern front was not improved either. As a result, the situation for the nationalists further worsened in the Campaign in Southwestern China.

== See also ==
- Outline of the Chinese Civil War
- National Revolutionary Army
- History of the People's Liberation Army
- Chinese Civil War
