= Western Tai'an Campaign =

1947 military campaign

- Part of the Chinese Civil War
Date	December 9, 1947 – June 15, 1948
Location	Tai'an, China
Result	Communist victory

Belligerents
National Revolutionary Army	People's Liberation Army

Commanders and leaders
Wang Yaowu	Zhao Jianmin; Fu Jiaxuan

Strength
4,500	8,900

Casualties and losses
3,645	1,000+

Western Tai'an Campaign was a series of battles fought between the nationalists and the communists during Chinese Civil War in the post World War II era, and resulted in the communist victory. The communists also refer this campaign as Campaign to Move Eastward (Chinese: 东进战役), and viewed this campaign as the prelude to Huaihai Campaign.

== Prelude ==
In December, 1947, nationalist commander Wang Yaowu ordered two brigade-sized reorganized regiments to strike western Tai'an, in the hope of strengthening the nationalist blockade along the canal and eradicating communists in western Tai'an. The nationalists' slogan at the time was to "Marching a hundred mile per day, swiftly swiping (the communists out of) western Tai'an." Nationalists proved to be overconfident, as Zhao Jianmin (赵健民), the commander-in-chief of the communist Hebei-Shandong-Henan Military Region and his chief-of-staff, Fu Jiaxuan (傅家选), decided to gather a force that was almost twice the size of the attacking nationalists to crush the nationalist blockade by destroying the overconfident nationalist attackers.

== Order of battle ==
Nationalists order of battle:

- 44th Reorganized Regiment (brigade-sized) of the 15th Reorganized Brigade (division-sized) of the 73rd Reorganized Division (army-sized)
- 45th Reorganized Regiment (brigade-sized) of the 15th Reorganized Brigade (division-sized) of the 73rd Reorganized Division (army-sized)

Communists order of battle:

- 1st Brigade of the Hebei-Shandong-Henan Military Region
- Independent Brigade of the Hebei-Shandong-Henan Military Region
- Artillery battalion of the Hebei-Shandong-Henan Military Region
- Basic Cadre Regiment of the 1st Military Sub Region the Hebei-Shandong-Henan Military Region
- A regiment of the 2nd Military Sub Region the Hebei-Shandong-Henan Military Region
- 14th Regiment of the 5th Military Sub Region the Hebei-Shandong-Henan Military Region
- Riverine Defense Regiment of the 6th Military Sub Region the Hebei-Shandong-Henan Military Region
- Dongping County Group (local garrison)
- Wenshang (汶上) County Group (local garrison)

== Campaign ==
The battle of the White Hamlet (Bai Tun, 白屯) was the fiercest and most decisive battle of the campaign, which first begun in the morning of December 19, 1947, and lasted well into the night. Under the cover of darkness, the communists attacked and took Xiang Hamlet (Xiang Tun, 项屯), White Hamlet (Bai Tun, 白屯) from the nationalists. The next day, fierce battle broke out at the bridge over Hui (汇) River at Ding Dock (Ding Wu, 丁坞) between the nationalist reinforcement and the communists. During the battle, over a dozen ROCAF aircraft participated in supporting the ground troops, but due to the fierce antiaircraft fire, two aircraft were lost when they collided with each other midair as they perform evasive maneuver. After the loss, nationalist air support became ineffective as aircraft flew at much higher altitude in avoiding ground fire. Despite suffering hundreds of casualties, including come regimental and battalion commanders, the communist nonetheless achieved victory by inflicting over two thousand casualties on the nationalists, capturing another seven hundred, and the nationalists were forced to retreat. After the victory, unbeknown to the two local communists, Zhang Jie (张杰), the director of communist militia and militia member Jie Chengsheng (解承生), the communist force immediately redeployed for other battles and as the two went to look for the communist regular army to get rifles and did not find anyone, they were reported missing in action and were never found. After the communist takeover, the two were named as revolutionary martyrs. The communists continued to score victories afterward in the following battles in the regions of Ding Family's Dock (Ding Jia Wu, 丁家坞) and Yuan's Mouth (Yuan Kou, 袁口) of Dongping County, and Performing Horses Hamlet (Yan Ma Zhuang, 演马庄) of Fat Town (Fei Cheng, 肥城). When the military actions finally ceased on January 9, 1948, the nationalist blockade along the canal was completely crushed and the communists had successfully linked up their bases in western Tai'an and Wen (汶) River region.

Although the military action ceased on January 9, 1948, the communist onslaught did not stop. Riding on their military victory, communists immediately launched another round of propaganda, political and psychological offensive aimed to encourage nationalist soldiers to desert or defect. By the end of early spring, nationalist reception centers in regions Mao's Shop (Mao Pu, 毛铺) and Luan's Bay (Luan Wan, 栾湾) in the fourth district and in the regions of Confucian Hamlet (Kong Cun, 孔村) and Xiaozhi (孝直) in the fifth district had been completed to support this effort. The Social Affairs Department, the communist spy agency and predecessor of the present day United Front Work Department of the CPC (UFWDCPC), was also reestablished first at Pingyin (平阴) county for the same purpose. The effort proved to be very successful that by June 15, 1948, 1,873 nationalist draftees from the 190 hamlets of Pingyin (平阴) county defected to the communist side, or half of total conscripts nationalist army drafted from the local region, bringing back 119 rifles and 26 handguns with them, and this only included the defectors, while nationalist deserters were not included. The biggest communist gain from this propaganda, political and psychological offensive, however, was important intelligence defectors had, and the intelligence obtained had helped the communists in the following Huaihai Campaign to achieve their next victory.

== See also ==
- Outline of the Chinese Civil War
- National Revolutionary Army
- History of the People's Liberation Army
