= Campaign to Suppress Bandits in Northeastern Guizhou =

Campaign to Suppress Nationalists in Northeastern Guizhou
- Part of the Chinese Civil War
Date	September 22, 1950 – November 29, 1950
Location	Northeastern Guizhou, China
Result	Communist victory

Belligerents
Republic of China Army (bandits loyal to the Nationalists)	People's Liberation Army

Commanders and leaders
Chen Quan (POW); Shi Zhaozhou †; Liu Gongwang (POW)	Zen Shaoshan

Strength
32,000+	13,000

Casualties and losses
32,000+	Minor

The Campaign to Suppress Nationalists in Northeastern Guizhou (黔东北剿匪) was a counter-guerrilla / counterinsurgency campaign the communists fought against the nationalist guerrilla that was mostly consisted of bandits and nationalist regular troops left behind after the nationalist regime withdrew from mainland China. The campaign was part of the Chinese Civil War in the post–World War II era fought in northeastern Guizhou, and resulted in communist victory. This campaign is a major part of Campaign to Suppress Bandits in Southwestern China during the Chinese Civil War in the post–World War II era.

== Order of battle ==
Nationalists: (32,000+ total):

- Northeastern Guizhou People's Self-Salvation Army commanded by Shi Zhaozhou (史肇周)
- Sichuan – Guizhou – Hunan – Hubei Popular Self Defense Army commanded by Chen Quan (陈铨)
- Other bands such as those commanded by Liu Gongwang (刘公旺)

Communists (13,000+ total) under unified command by Zen Shaoshan (曾绍山):

- Detachments of 31st Division of the communist 11th Army
- Detachments of 32nd Division of the communist 11th Army
- Detachments of 34th Division of the communist 11th Army
- Detachments from communist Peiling (涪陵) Military Sub-District
- Detachments from communist Youyang Military Sub-District
- Detachments from communist Zunyi Military Sub-District
- Detachments from communist Tongren Military Sub-District

== Campaign ==
After communist takeover of Guizhou in November 1949, the few surviving nationalists failed to escape in time decided to join the locals to continue their struggle against their communist enemy. Five counties in northeastern Guizhou including Daozhen (道真), Zheng'An (正安), Wuchuan (婺川), Yanhe (沿河), and Dejiang (德江) were controlled by the nationalist guerrilla the communists decided to eliminate these threats. In September 1950, communists gathered enough troops from various detachments and formed the Bandit Eradication Command, and the deputy commander-in-chief of the communist Eastern Sichuan Military District, Zen Shaoshan (曾绍山) was put in charge of the new command.

The first stage of the campaign begun on September 22, 1950, when 20 communist battalions totaling around 13,000 begun their simultaneous attacks on the following four counties: Daozhen (道真), Zheng'An (正安), Wuchuan (婺川), and Yanhe (沿河), all of which fell into communist hands immediately. By the beginning of October, 1950, the organized resistance of bandits have mostly ceased. Communists strengthened their political pressure and most bandits were forced to surrender. In the period of fifty – days, over 28,000 bandits were annihilated, including over 22,000 surrendered and defected to the communists.

The second stage of the campaign begun on November 18, 1950, and a total of ten communist battalions concentrated their efforts in the Fanjing (梵净) Mountain region where surviving bandits had fled to. After eleven days of fighting, over 4,100 bandits were annihilated, with major bandit chief either captured or killed. The communists subsequently declared the campaign was over as the northeastern Guizhou region was secured.

== See also ==
- Outline of the Chinese Civil War
- National Revolutionary Army
- History of the People's Liberation Army
- Chinese Civil War
