= Liang Huazhi =

Chinese politician (1906–1949)

- 梁化之
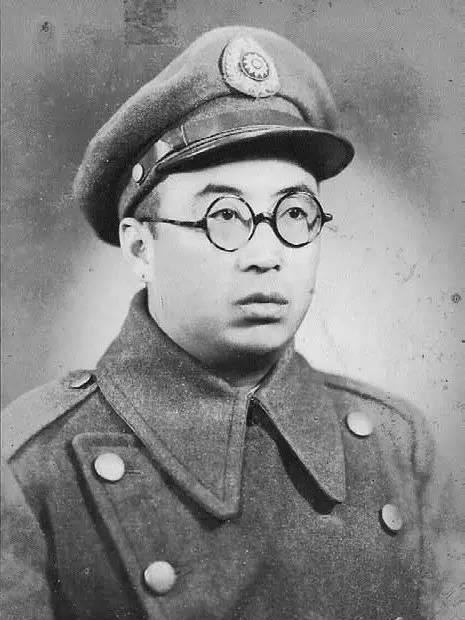

Governor of Shanxi Provincial Government
- In office March 29, 1949 – April 24, 1949
- Preceded by: Yan Xishan
- Succeeded by: Government dissolved

Director of the Political Department of the Second War Zone
- In office 1937–1945

Personal details
- Born: 1 November 1906 Dingxiang, Shanxi, China
- Died: 24 April 1949 (aged 42) Taiyuan, Shanxi, Republic of China
- Party: Kuomintang
- Nickname: Liang Dunhou

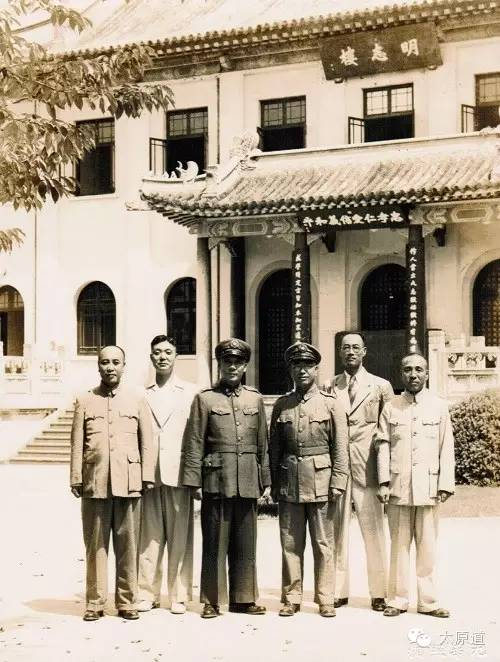
Liang Huazhi third from the right.

Liang Huazhi (Chinese: 梁化之 (Courtesy Name), 梁敦厚 (Given Name); pinyin: Liáng Huàzhī; Wade–Giles: Liang Hua-chih; 1 November 1906, Dingxiang, Shanxi – April 24, 1949, Taiyuan, Shanxi) was a Kuomintang official who served in the warlord Yan Xishan's government, as the Acting Governor of Shanxi during Chinese Civil War.

A relative of Yan, Liang rose rapidly through Shanxi's power structure, founding and leading a number of organizations dedicated to combating both internal and external threats to Yan's rule. At first radically socialist and later radically anti-communist, Liang's life illustrates the rapid and dramatic career changes that were not uncommon in the chaotic age in which he lived. Liang is best known for the way that he died, committing suicide in a spectacular fashion as a final act of defiance against Shanxi's Communist invaders.

== Early career ==
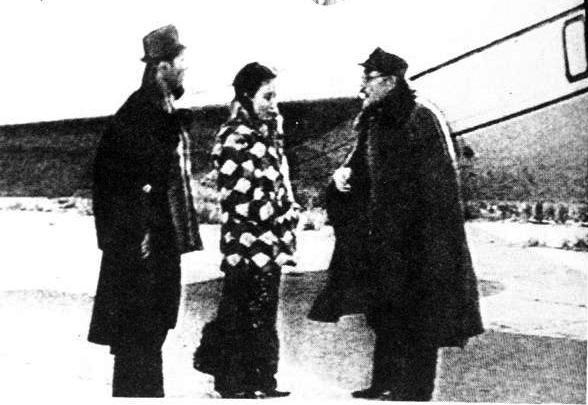
Before Yan Xishan (right) left Taiyuan by plane in 1949, Liang Huazhi (left) and Yan Huiqing (middle) saw him off at the airport

Liang's political career began in 1932, at the age of 26, when he was named a member of the Kuomintang Shanxi Provincial Governing Committee. Liang was Yan Xishan's nephew, and rapidly gained power within Yan's government in the environment created by Yan's radical economic policies (modeled on those of the Soviet Union) in the early 1930s. The opposition that Yan's socialist economic policies aroused among Shanxi's traditional elites made Yan favour the service of young, progressive followers with modern educations. From the start, Liang's influence on his uncle Yan was profound. By the 1930s Liang was the leader of the group of young bureaucrats in Shanxi who admired the industrial accomplishments of the Soviet Union, and who were determined to see a similar degree of economic progress achieved in modern China. Liang's enthusiasm for realizing Soviet accomplishments were so well known that, before the Second Sino-Japanese War, a Japanese writer accused Liang of being a Communist. Liang worked as Yan's secret representative to the Chinese Communist Party in 1936, and he succeeded in negotiating an anti-Japanese "united front" agreement between Yan and the Communists in October 1936.

== Second Sino-Japanese War ==
In September 1936, on the eve of the Second Sino-Japanese War, Yan created the "Patriotic Sacrifice League", a semi-independent organization composed primarily of students and recent graduates for the purpose of encouraging the resistance against the Japanese invasion of China that Yan believed was imminent. Liang, who by 1936 was serving as Yan's personal secretary and enjoyed Yan's complete confidence, became one of the main leaders of the Sacrifice League. In 1937 the Japanese finally invaded and occupied the northern half of Shanxi, suffering over 50,000 casualties. After the Japanese invasion Liang served as the Director of the Political Department of the Second War Zone, which included Shanxi, Suiyuan, Chahar, and northern Shaanxi. In order to help defeat the Japanese Yan enlisted the assistance of the Communists, who entered Shanxi and initially cooperated with Yan in order to defeat the Japanese.

In July 1937, shortly after the Marco Polo Bridge Incident, Liang's Sacrifice League led efforts to arrest, and promote awareness about the dangers of, Japanese spies and hanjian. After the Japanese began to seriously threaten Yan's capital of Taiyuan, Yan authorized the expansion of the Sacrifice League's "Dare-to-Die Corps" to a force of 15,000 men. This branch of the Sacrifice League became known as the "New Army", was composed mostly of young students, and became known for its fanatical resistance against the Japanese and for the pro-Communist views of its membership. During 1937 and 1938 Yan actively replaced his own magistrates with members of the Sacrifice League, who he believed were less selfish, more enthusiastic, and thus better qualified to lead an organized resistance against Japan. After withdrawing to southern Shanxi and waging a guerilla war against the Japanese, Yan owed much of his ability to work with and mobilize the local people to the efforts of Liang's Sacrifice League, whose members placed a high priority on their cooperation with the common people.

By 1939 Yan's relationship with the Communists had become very poor. Because the Sacrifice League was suspected of being pro-Communist, Yan actively suppressed it, arresting many of its members and attempting to disarm its Dare-to-Die Corps. Those who escaped fled to join the Communists. Liang remained loyal to Yan; and, by the early 1940s, was known as being fanatically anti-Communist. After the destruction of the Sacrifice League, Liang became the commander of Yan's police force, responsible for investigating and arresting citizens suspected of being Communists in the area that Yan controlled. Liang's rapid intellectual change, from radical support to radical opposition of Communists and communism, illustrates the dramatic shifts of allegiance that often took place within the minds of individual Chinese between 1937 and 1945.

== Chinese Civil War ==
Hostilities continued between the Communists and Yan's forces shortly after the surrender of the Japanese in 1945. These hostilities continued until 1949, when the Communists took control of most of Shanxi, completely surrounding Yan's capital, Taiyuan, and cutting it off from all sources of military and logistical supply. In 1949, shortly before his death, Liang was named the Chairman of the Government of Shanxi.

The fall of Taiyuan was one of the few examples in the Chinese Civil War in which Nationalist forces echoed the defeated Ming loyalists who had, in the 17th century, brought entire cities to ruins resisting the invading Manchus. Many Nationalist officers were reported to have committed suicide when the city fell. Liang Huazhi fought for years against the Communists in Shanxi until he was finally trapped in the massively fortified city of Taiyuan. For six months Liang led a savage resistance, leading both Yan's remaining forces and those of the warlord's thousands of Japanese mercenaries. When Communist troops broke into the city and began to occupy large sections of it, Liang barricaded himself inside a large, fortified prison complex filled with Communist prisoners. In a final act of desperation, Liang set fire to the prison and committed suicide as the entire compound burned to the ground.
