= Campaign to Suppress Bandits in Eastern China =

Communist campaign against nationalist holdouts in China

- Part of Chinese Civil War
Date	August 9, 1949 – December 1953
Location	Eastern China
Result	Communist victory

Belligerents
Flag of the National Revolutionary Army National Revolutionary Army	PLA People's Liberation Army

Commanders and leaders
Flag of the ROC ?	Flag of the PRC ?

Strength
246,000+	150,000

Casualties and losses
246,000+	Several hundred

The Campaign to Suppress Bandits in Eastern China was a counter-guerrilla / counterinsurgency campaign the communists fought against the nationalist guerrilla that was mostly consisted of bandits and nationalist regular troops left behind after the nationalist government withdrew from mainland China. The campaign resulted in communist victory.

== Prelude ==
During its southward thrust against the retreating nationalists in May 1949, the communist 3rd Field Army was already preparing to suppress bandits in the following provinces of China: Shandong, Zhejiang, Fujian, Jiangsu, Anhui and Shanghai. Intelligence work on bandits was already in process and by July 1949, there were more than 113,000 bandits and another 10,000 pirates totaling over 700 bands. As the defeated nationalist regular forces scattered, most of them joined bandits to continue their struggle against communist, and the strength of bandits was more than doubled.

To eliminate this threat posed by bandits in eastern China, the communist 3rd Field Army deployed a total of nineteen divisions over the next four years to eradicate the bandits, and on August 9, 1949, the official order was given and the full-scale campaign had formally begun, with the concentration in Zhejiang and Anhui for initial phase in the autumn.

== Order of battle ==
Nationalists

- 3rd Column of the Defense Ministry
- 3rd Column of the Jiangsu-Anhui Military Region
- National Self-Salvation Army North Fujian Command
- 8th Column of the Fujian People's Anticommunism Army
- Popular Self-defense Army of Zhejiang – Fujian – Jiangxi Border Region

Communists

- 5 Armies (1st Stage) and 19 Divisions (2nd Stage) of the 3rd Field Army

== 1st Stage ==
Large scale offensive against bandits begun in the late August, after small scale probing assaults, and by January 1950, over fifty-four thousand bandits were annihilated, along with their major bases in Taihu, and the border region of Fujian, Zhejiang and Jiangxi. The large bands of bandits in Jiangsu, northern Anhui and Zhejiang were destroyed. From 1950 onward, the communists targeted Fujian and Zhejiang as the major concentration to eliminate the remaining bandits that survived the major offensives. In Fujian, a total of eight regiments of regular communist forces were deployed, succeeding in destroy the major bandit force under the nationalist command titled National Self-Salvation Army North Fujian Command. On the other fronts, communist forces succeeded in annihilating bandits forces of the 3rd Column of the Defense Ministry and the 3rd Column of the Jiangsu-Anhui Military Region that were active in the regions of Zhejiang, southern Jiangsu and northern Anhui.

After the Korean War broke out in June 1950, bandits stepped up their offensives, believing that the communists would be soon defeated by the Americans and the nationalists would return soon under the help of their western allies. The communists adjusted their strategies accordingly by increasing their forces to a total of seven regular divisions, four local garrison divisions, and additional militia units. In Fujian, the communist regular army strength was increased to 50% to twelve regiments from the original eight. In Zhejiang, two divisions of the communist 22nd Army and a division of the communist 23rd Army were deployed in Tiantai (天台) region, Chuanshan (穿山) and Xiangshan (象山) peninsulas, where bandit activities were heavy. The communist strategy was to first eradicate bandits in the heartlands, wealth regions, and regions next to the transportation / communication lines, and then those remote and poverty-stricken regions. In November 1950, Mao Zedong ordered that another landing on Kinmen (Quemoy) to be postponed, until bandits in Fujian are completely eradicated. The communist force in the province soon swelled to five divisions and after several months of eradication attempts, over thirty bands of bandits were completely annihilated, including 8th Column of the Fujian People's Anticommunism Army and the Popular Self-defense Army of Zhejiang – Fujian – Jiangxi Border Region. By June 1951, all major organized bandit guerrillas were completely destroyed when communists succeeded in annihilating over 114,500 bandits.

== 2nd Stage ==
From June 1951 onward, the communist strategy shifted to eradication of the surviving bandits who managed to escape earlier eradication efforts. With nearly all of the former nationalist forces wiped out in the 1st stage of the campaign, the survivors were mostly bandits with nationalist military advisors and agents, which were not as effective as before, when there were more regular army soldiers in the nationalist guerrillas. The eradication tasks were consequently transferred to the local communist garrison and police force, with the help of local militias, while the communist regular force was withdrawn. Within a year, most of the surviving bandits on the mainland were annihilated.

However, the communists faced greater challenges in their struggle against pirates backed by the nationalist government in Taiwan, where communists were forced to deploy regular marines and navy, which was still in their infancy and thus inadequate for naval battles. Instead of challenging the superior nationalist navy that backed the pirates, the communists adopted an alternative strategy by ambushing pirates who landed on the mainland, where the communist force was strong. The tactic proved to be effective and in the month of January 1951 alone, over fifteen hundred pirates in over a hundred twenty bands were annihilated. An additional several hundred pirates were also annihilated in 1951 when the communist navy engaged in fifty-six naval battles against pirates at sea, succeeding in sinking and capturing fifty-two boats and ships from the pirates. Beginning in 1951, communists also begun their island hopping campaign to capture coastal islands and eradicate pirates stationed on these islands. When these islands fell into communist hands, the surviving pirates were forced to withdraw and the communist success in these naval engagements was mainly because its weak naval forces operated under the cover of shore artillery batteries and air cover.

The attempt to secure these coast islands took much longer than the fighting on lands, and it was not until the end of 1953 when the communist victory was finally achieved, which concluded the campaign itself. The communists succeeded in annihilating over 246,000 bandits (including over 7,800 pirates), capturing over 400 artillery pieces, over 115,000 small arms and dozens of boats.

== See also ==
- Outline of the Chinese Civil War
- National Revolutionary Army
- History of the People's Liberation Army
- Chinese Civil War
