= Campaign to Suppress Bandits in Northern Guangdong =

1950 military campaign

- Part of Chinese Civil War
Date	September 1950 – January 1951
Location	China
Result	Communist victory

Belligerents
Flag of the National Revolutionary Army National Revolutionary Army	PLA People's Liberation Army

Commanders and leaders
Flag of the ROC Liang Mengxiong	Flag of the PRC ?

Strength
1,000+	7,000

Casualties and losses
1,000+	Unknown

The Campaign to Suppress Bandits in Northern Guangdong was a counter-guerrilla / counterinsurgency campaign the communists fought against the nationalist guerrilla that was mostly consisted of bandits and nationalist regular troops left behind after the nationalist government withdrew from mainland China. The campaign was fought during the Chinese Civil War in the post-World War II era, and resulted in communist victory.

== Order of battle ==
Nationalists

- Anti-communist National Salvation Army

Communists

- 132nd Division

== 1st Stage ==
As the nationalists withdrew from Guangzhou to escape the advancing communists, the nationalist military intelligence head Mao Renfeng (毛人凤) ordered Li Jilan (李及兰), the nationalist commander-in-chief of Guangzhou Garrison to organize local bandits to fight a guerrilla war against the communists, causing as much damage as possible to the enemy. This was achieved via providing bandits with weaponry and money in silver, and sending agents to each band of bandits as advisors. The local bandits were united under the command of Anti-communist National Salvation Army. In response, the communists launched a campaign to suppress these local bandits, an effort headed by the communist 132nd Division.

The Fifth Hamlet (Wucun, 五村) of the Triple Mountain (Sanshan, 三山) Township of Yingde was the home base of bandits headed by Ou Yang (欧阳), who established his reign ruthlessly by executing those who are suspected of being sympathetic of communists. Additionally, the hamlet chief was punished as well, fined heavily in terms of rice that totaled 1,200 kg. However, such brutal acts only alienated him and his fellow bandits from the local population, with many of them fleeing their homes to escape the bandits. Despite the initial fear and reluctance to talk to the communists when the communist 2nd Company of the 394th Regiment of the 132nd Division first entered the hamlet in September 1950, the local populace was soon won over by the communists, nine of villagers joined the communist forces, while those who fled their homes also returned, after hearing the good words about communists from those who stayed behind and met the communists. On November 19, 1950, communist forces set up an ambush in the area where Ou Yang was known to be, the foothills of the Changbeng (长崩) Mountain based on the intelligence provided by the local populace. Around 8:00 pm, Ou Yang and his bodyguard approached the communists in hiding, but discovered the ambush and opened up on the communists first. The communists returned fire and managed to kill Ou Yang's bodyguard, and wounded his leg. The next, following the blood trial, communists captured Ou Yang in a cave. With their chieftain captured alive, the surviving bandits in Ou Yang's band dispersed and went into hiding in the mountains.

In the border region of Yingde and Yangshan (阳山), there was another band of bandits headed by a father – son team. During the bandit suppression campaign, the father, Huang Yuan (黄元), was first captured by the communists. Huang Yang (黄阳), the son, refused to surrender and in his desperate attempt to escape, he ordered his bandits to kidnap more than a dozen innocent young children as a human shield. As they had made their successful escape, the young children obviously could not keep up with bandits. Feeling the children were slowing them down, Huang Yang ordered all of them to be executed. The atrocities committed by Huang Yang had completed alienated the local populace and drove his very last sympathizers to the communist side, who provided intelligence to the communists on the bandits whereabouts from then on. On December 17, 1950, based on the intelligence provided by the local populations, communist 394th Regiment begun their search in the Yali (鸦理) Mountains in the region to the west of the Liumei (流眉) region. After one and half a day of search, the hiding place of Huang Yang was discovered and in the gunfight that followed, Huang Yang managed to wound three communists but all of his bandits were killed, and Huang Yang himself severely wounded. As communists approached, Huang Yang fired a last shot, wounding two communists with on bullet, before he was killed by the returning fire from the communists. This marked the end of large scale battles in the campaign, and the following operation became eradication operations on much smaller scale.

== 2nd Stage ==
With bandits dispersed and went into hiding, the communists changed their tactics accordingly in the following mopping up operations. Political pressure increased with the mobilization of local population, with a team of three to five members stationed in every hamlet. In addition, ordinary bandits were treated differently than their chieftains in an attempt to convince them to give themselves up, and the practice proved to be effective, especially in the area that had been plagued by bandits previously, such as in the Yellow Flower (Huanghua, 黄花) township of Yingde.

Wang Min (王敏), the deputy political commissar of the communist 2nd Company led his team to station in the Weishan (唯山) hamlet of the Yellow Flower (Huanghua, 黄花) township of Yingde. One night, the local populace reported that a bandit had returned to the hamlet and the communists managed to capture him. Based on the interrogation, another bandit returning to the hamlet was also captured on the next day. The bandits were soon convinced to switch to the communist side, leading a communist platoon to the hiding place of their former chieftain, Liu Yu (刘裕), the nationalist regimental commander of 2nd Regiment of the Northern River Column of the Anti-communist National Salvation Army. Liu Yu managed to narrow escape his capture, but both of his concubines were captured alive by the communists. Because Liu Yu's two concubines did not commit any crimes, they were soon released, and to help them settle down for a new life, food and vegetables were provided to them at no cost. The concubines were very grateful and volunteered to write to Liu Yu to ask him to give himself up, which he did. After turning himself in, it was discovered Liu Yu only joined the nationalist guerrilla but he and his bandits did not commit any serious crime against the general population like Huang Yang, so Liu Yu was soon released also. To help him to settle down to a new life, food and agricultural production tools were provide to him and his family free of charge. This policy had since become a wide practice in the local region, succeeding in convincing more than 230 bandits to surrender to the communist 395th Regiment stationed in the area, and only 8 bandits were killed for refusing to surrender.

The success at the Yellow Flower township was adopted by the others in the entire northern Guangdong, and with emphasis on the relatives of those bandits. The result was that not only low-ranking bandits, but also their chieftains begun to turn themselves in, including Ou Yang's relatives, such as Ou Yakang (欧亚康), Ou Shenmei (欧沈妹), Ou Yazhang (欧亚章) and 28 other bandit chieftains. As the general population turned to the communists and many of their comrades-in-arms turned themselves in, the surviving bandits found it increasingly difficult to operate and recruit. The commander-in-chief of the bandits turned nationalist guerrilla, Liang Mengxiong (梁猛熊), was reduced to recruit and resupply by death threats, executing those who dared to say no. However, executing civilians who refused to corporate only further drive the general population away, into the communist sides. As a result, the bandits were reduced to a mere dozen, all of them were eventually captured in caves, and Liang Mengxiong was barely able to escape with his own life, becoming the only one who had successfully managed to escape. Fearing that he would be prosecuted for his rapid failure by the nationalist government, Liang Mengxiong dared not to flee to Taiwan, but instead, fled overseas. Ironically, many of Liang Mengxiong's relatives, including his distant nephew Liang Daping (梁达平) and niece Liang Shaomei (梁少梅) joined the communists during the campaign, and eventually became important officers in the People's Liberation Army local garrison. After four months of operations, by the end of January 1951, the local bandits were completely eradicated and the communist 132nd Division was reassigned to a different task of supporting land reforms in Zengcheng, Dongguan and Boluo (博罗).

== Outcome ==
Although sharing the common anticommunist goal, the nationalist guerrilla and insurgency warfare was largely handicapped by the enlistment of bandits, many of whom had fought and killed nationalist troops earlier in the eradication / pacification campaign, and also looted, kidnapped and even killed landlords and business owners, an important faction that supported the nationalist government, but now must united against the common enemy, which is half-hearted at the best. Compounding the problem further with additional differences within the ranks of the nationalist guerillas themselves, the futile nationalist guerrilla and insurgency warfare against its communist enemy was destined to fail.

== See also ==
- Outline of the Chinese Civil War
- National Revolutionary Army
- History of the People's Liberation Army
- Chinese Civil War
