= Zhao Zhongrong =

Chinese general (1905–1951)

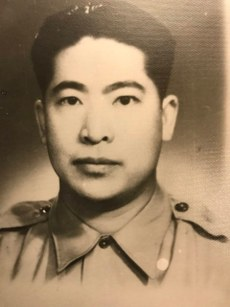
- Born: 1905; Shanxi, Qing dynasty
- Died: 25 March 1951 (aged 45–46) Beijing, People's Republic of China
- Allegiance: Republic of China
- Branch: (Republic of China (1912–1949)) National Revolutionary Army
- Rank: Lieutenant General
- Conflicts: Second Sino-Japanese War; Chinese Civil War; Pingjin campaign

Zhao Zhongrong (1905 – 25 March 1951), courtesy name Yongkuan, was a lieutenant general in the Army of the Republic of China. He was a native of Guo County, Shanxi Province. He graduated from the Law Department of Chaoyang University in Beijing and Sun Yat-sen University in Guangzhou. He served as the county magistrate in Baotou (then known as Baotou County), the founder of the Three People's Principles, executive director of the Central Committee of the Youth League, director of the Peking Office of the 12th War Zone of the Second Sino-Japanese War, standing member of the Central Executive Committee of the Kuomintang, and member of the first legislative session after the implementation of the constitution. During the second civil war between the Kuomintang and the Chinese Communist Party, he was sent to monitor Fu Zuoyi. After the rebellion, Zhongrong was imprisoned and shot at the Yongdingmen execution ground in Beijing on 25 March 1951.

== Life ==
Born in Shanxi Province in the late Qing dynasty, he joined the Kuomintang when he was in middle school. He studied at the Law Department of Chaoyang University in Beijing in 1922. In 1925, he and Chiang Ching-kuo were sent by the Kuomintang to Sun Yat-sen University in Guangzhou for further studies. After returning to China, he served in the Kuomintang Beiping City Party Headquarters, in 1936 he was appreciated by Shanxi Provincial Chairman Xu Yongchang and appointed as the county magistrate of Baotou County. The Second Sino-Japanese War broke out in 1937, and Baoutou was forced to evacuate after its fall in October of that year. In the same year, he served as a major general in the Eighth Theater (第八战区) of the National Revolutionary Army during the Second Sino-Japanese War. In 1938, the Three People's Principles Youth League was established, and Zhongrong served as the preparatory director, director and secretary-general. In 1945, he was appointed as both the alternate Central Supervisory Committee member of the sixth session of the Kuomintang and the executive director of the Central Committee of the Three People's Principles Youth League. After the end of the Second Sino-Japanese War, he was promoted to lieutenant general and served as the director of Zhang Yuan's Office of Appeasement in Peking. In 1947, he was elected as the executive director of the Central Committee of the Kuomintang. Member, he was elected as the first legislator of the second district of Shanxi Province after the implementation of the constitution in 1948.

On 25 March 1951, he was shot at the Yongdingmen execution ground in Beijing.

== Commemorations ==
After his death, his family was ruthlessly suppressed and persecuted. His wife was imprisoned by Ruiyun for 20 years. His daughter was sent to a labor camp in Inner Mongolia. After the reform and opening up, Zhao Zhongrong's daughter Zhao Anna moved overseas and began to work hard for her father to be enshrined in the Martyrs' Shrine in Taipei, the Republic of China. In February 2018, Feng Shih-kuan, Minister of Defense of the Republic of China, approved the posthumous recognition of Zhao Zhongrong as a martyr. On 27 March, Zhao Zhongrong was enshrined in the National Revolutionary Martyrs' Shrine, becoming the highest ranking general who died in mainland China and was enshrined in the Martyrs' Shrine after the government moved to Taiwan.
