= Campaign to Suppress Bandits in Western Guangxi =

1951 military campaign

- Part of Chinese Civil War
Date	April 15, 1951 – September 1951
Location	China
Result	Communist victory

Belligerents
Flag of the National Revolutionary Army National Revolutionary Army	PLA People's Liberation Army

Commanders and leaders
Flag of the ROC Wu Zhongjian (吴中坚)	Flag of the PRC ?

Strength
13,000+	20,000+

Casualties and losses
Unknown	Unknown

The Campaign to Suppress Bandits in Guangxi was a counter-guerrilla / counterinsurgency campaign the communists fought against the nationalist guerrilla force that mostly consisted of bandits and nationalist regular troops left behind after the nationalist government withdrew from mainland China. This campaign is the last stage of the Campaign to Suppress Bandits in Guangxi, after which the last nationalist forces left in Guangxi were killed. The campaign took place during the Chinese Civil War in the post-World War II era in the western Guangxi, and resulted in communist victory.

== Order of battle ==
Nationalists:

- Anti-Communist National Salvation Army of the Border Area of Guangxi – Guizhou
- 7th Army Group of Anti-Communist National Salvation Army
- Anti-Communist Uprising People's Army
- Chinese Liberation People's National Establishment Communist Eradication Army of Vietnam – Guangxi Front

Communists:

- 219th Division
- Units of 217th Division
- 6 regiments of Nanning and Baise Military Sub-regions
- 13 battalions of communist forces from Guizhou and Yunnan

== Campaign ==
After the nationalist government was driven off from mainland China, it ordered the troops left behind in western Guangxi to join forces with local bandits to attack communists to harass the communist enemy. By March 1951, over 70 bands of bandits totaling over 13,000 strong were active in western Guangxi, and succeeded in temporarily taking two towns Xilong (西隆) and Xilin (西林), while another 13 towns were attacked. In response, communists decided to eradicate these bandits and formed the Western Guangxi Bandit Eradication Task Committee and the general headquarters for bandit eradication in April 1951, commanding forces that was primarily consisted of formations from the 53rd Army of the XXI Corps. Troops deployed included the 219th Division, a portion of the 217th Division, 6 regiments of Nanning and Baise Military Sub-regions, and 13 battalions of communist forces from Guizhou and Yunnan.

On April 15, 1951, the campaign formally begun and within several days, over a thousand bandits were killed by the communist 219th Division in the area it was responsible for. The Independent Regiment of Baise Military Sub-region succeeded in annihilating the Anti-Communist National Salvation Army of the Border Area of Guangxi – Guizhou, killing its commander Lu Feipeng (陆飞鹏) along with over a hundred bandits. In the regions of Eastern Orchid (Donglan, 东兰) and Windy Mountain (Fengshan, 风山), the communist 649th Regiment succeeded in killing over five hundred bandits. By end of May, the communists annihilated most of the bandits, succeeding in capturing nationalist commanders assigned to lead these bandits, including Wu Wu (), the chief-of-staff of the 7th Army Group of Anti-Communist National Salvation Army, and Huang Zhaoyin (黄兆辰), the commander of Chinese Liberation People's National Establishment Communist Eradication Army of Vietnam – Guangxi Front. The nationalist commander in charge of the region, Wu Zhongjian (), the commander-in-chief of 7th Army Group of Anti-Communist National Salvation Army was killed in action, along with most of his staff, some of whom were airdropped into the region earlier to help to fight communists.

== See also ==
- Outline of the Chinese Civil War
- National Revolutionary Army
- History of the People's Liberation Army
- Chinese Civil War
