= Campaign to Suppress Bandits in Northern China =

1949 military campaign

- Part of Chinese Civil War
Date	April 1949 – June 1950
Location	China
Result	Chinese Communist Party victory

Belligerents
National Revolutionary Army	People's Liberation Army

Commanders and leaders
unknown	Nie Rongzhen

Strength
30,000+	Unknown

Casualties and losses
29,000+	Unknown

The Campaign to Suppress Bandits in Northern China was a military campaign in Northern China conducted by the Chinese Communist Party (CCP) against Kuomintang (KMT) guerrilla forces, along with locals who were recruited by the KMT (referred to by the CCP as "bandits") during the Chinese Civil War. The campaign was fought during the Chinese Civil War in the post-World War II phase and resulted in a CCP victory.

== Campaign ==
Prior to withdrawing from Northern China, the Kuomintang and affiliated forces engaged in guerilla warfare against CCP forces.

Nie Rongzhen was in charge of the campaign. The campaign was conducted via political pressure and direct attacks on Kuomintang forces.

== Outcome ==
The Northern China campaign resulted in the capture and execution of Kuomintang-affiliated forces, along with local guerillas.

== See also ==
- Outline of the Chinese Civil War
- National Revolutionary Army
- History of the People's Liberation Army
- Chinese Civil War
