= Campaign to Suppress Bandits in Longquan =

1950 military campaign

- Part of Chinese Civil War
Date	February 4 – December 1950
Location	China
Result	Communist victory

Belligerents
National Revolutionary Army	People's Liberation Army

Commanders and leaders
Ma Li (马力)	unknown

Strength
~10,000	~2,000

Casualties and losses
Several thousand	Several dozen

The Campaign to Suppress Bandits in Longquan was a counterinsurgency campaign by the People's Liberation Army against the National Revolutionary Army and other Kuomintang-aligned forces. The campaign was part of the larger Campaign to Suppress Bandits in Northwestern China.

== Order of battle ==
Nationalists

- Sichuan – Xikang People's Anti-communist National Salvation Army 1st Column

Communists

- 87th Regiment
- 2 Battalions of Chengdu Garrison Regiment
- 2 Battalions of Western Sichuan Military Sub-region
- Longquanyi District (garrison) Squadron

== Initial stage ==
As the nationalist government withdrew from western Sichuan to escape advancing communists, it ordered its forces left behind to join the locals to wage a guerrilla war against communist forces. Additional nationalist agents and military professionals were sent to join bandits as military advisors. To fight their common communist enemy, local bandits, and bodyguards of landlords and opium drug lords set aside their long term hostilities toward each other and managed to form an unlikely alliance united under the fleeing nationalist government, organized as Sichuan – Xikang People's Anti-communist National Salvation Army 1st Column, commanded by Chieftain Ma Li (马力). The second most powerful force of the local nationalist support came from landlord Liu Hui'an (刘惠安), whose personal army was estimated to consist of 500 troops. With other bandits in regions of Jianyang, Sichuan and Huayang (华阳), Nationalist forces totaled over ten thousand, and agreed to carry out the large scale attack on the enemy planned by the nationalist government, codenamed as March 3 Riot, after the planned lunar calendar date of March 3, 1950 (Gregorian calendar date of April 19, 1950). However, the anti-communist alliance experienced infighting due to conflicting interests between members. As a result, most battles were reduced to small skirmishes carried out independently by individual bands of bandits, and personal armies of landlords and drug lords.

Before the planned major attack, small attacks on the communists were already carried out, targeting the communist grain gathering teams. On April 2, 1950, a communist grain gathering team headed by Zhu Xiangli (朱向离) was ambushed and wiped out completely. On April 14, 1950, a nine-member communist grain gathering team led by commissar Zhang Xiang (张翔) was captured by a team headed by Liu Daichang (刘代长) and Liu Daifu (刘代富) at the Wanxing (万兴) Township tea plantation, and were subsequently executed at the region of Xiachangkou (下场口) of Wanxing township. The next day, another communist grain gathering squad led by Gu Shusen (顾树森) was captured in Jigong (鸡公) Mountain, and all nine members were executed. Meanwhile, local drug lords also begun their fight against communists when the biggest local drug lord Liu Chaozhang (刘朝章) was arrested by the communists. As communist forces were destroying Liu Chaozhang's opium plantation totaled several dozen acres, they were constantly harassed by sniper fire in the process during their drug eradication effort that lasted more than two weeks. Attacks like these prompted the communists to formally launch a campaign to eradicate bandits in the local area. Although the communists strength was in absolute disadvantage, they were helped greatly by the lack of corporation among bandits themselves.

== Battle of Hungtuchang ==
On April 14, 1950, over a thousand bandits from Ma Li (马力)'s band gathered in the region of Yellow Earth Field (Huangtuchang, 黄土场), and prepared to attack communists. As communists learned the news, they immediately decided to launch a preemptive strike against the nationalist guerrilla despite absolute numerical inferiority. The 5th Company of the communist 87th Regiment was ordered to proceed to Yellow Earth Field to attack the main body of the bandit force, and the Longquanyi District (garrison) Squadron was ordered to attack nearby Stone Plate Beach (Shibantan, 石板滩) to help. The battle lasted continuously for two night and two days, and the nationalists were completely surprised by the sudden preemptive strike by their enemy. The bandits, landlords, and drug lords only wanted to keep their own strength and did not want to sacrifice their own force for the others, and everybody expected others to fight the communist enemy instead. As a result, different bands of bandits begun to flee from the battlefield almost as soon as the battle begun, and others soon followed.

The flight of bandits from the battlefield begun more rampant when another news reached the battlefield: of thousands bandits active in the region, only a hundred or so came to help fight the communist enemy, while all of the rest did not do anything. Only bandits under the command of chieftain Zhang Hua (张华) and the nationalist agent Wang Zhongxian (王忠贤) put up some real resistance, but they efforts were futile and they were nearly completely annihilated. As the main force of bandits were defeated and dispersed, every member of the 100 plus strong bandit reinforcement was also captured alive by the communists. The communist casualties were surprising low, with only one fatality, the 2nd platoon commander Jiao Lianyu (焦连玉) was killed in action, while other five soldiers were injured.

== Battle of Luodai ==
Although most other bandits in the area did not help those in the battle of the Yellow Earth Field because they did not want to risk themselves for others, they did select another target to strike. As the communist 5th Company of the communist 87th Regiment was ordered to the battle of the Yellow Earth Field from Luodai (洛带), the area it was originally stationed, the only communist presence left behind was a single squad and civilian administrators. Many bandits believed that this was a great opportunity to attack Luodai due to the weakened defense and they would be successful capturing a lot of supplies. By April 15, 1950, around five thousand bandits besieged the communist military base / administrative headquarters at Luodai and launched their attack. The communist defenders proved to be much tougher than expected and even the communist civilian administrators taking up arms fought better than most bandits.

After continuous attacks were beaten back, bandits changed their strategy by attempting to besiege the communist base for longtime, because they were confident that the numerically superior bandit force at the battle of Yellow Earth Field would succeed in wiping out the numerically inferior communist enemy, and the communist defenders of the base would have no choice but to surrender. Additionally, different bands of bandits were unwilling to sacrifice themselves for others to attack the base again, because if they were killed, they would not be able to share the spoils while others could. However, by April 17, 1950, the shocking news of the numerically superior bandit force at the battle of the Yellow Earth Field reached Luodai, and bandits were completely dumbfounded that their numerically superior force was completely annihilated. More bad news followed as the bandits learned that the communist forces at the battle of the Yellow Earth Field consisting of the 5th Company of the 87th Regiment and Longquanyi District (garrison) Squadron were on their way back to help their comrades. By 9:00 p.m. on April 17, 1950, they had reached Luodai. Communists were helped by their reinforcements consisting of two battalions of Western Sichuan Military Sub-region. After a fierce battle that continuously lasted a day and a night, bandits was completely annihilated and dispersed, and went into hiding as they fled the battlefield. Following their victory, the communists begun their mopping up operation by combing every single hamlet, and forced bandits to flee from the Luodai to Longquanyi District.

== Battle of Longquan ==
While the battle of Luodai was raging on, several thousand bandits attacked Longquanyi District from two different direction, with one thrust from Baihe (柏合) Township, and another from Ping'an (平安) Township. The local communist garrison only totaled seventy, but there was an armory where mortars stored. Fifteen minutes after the bandits launched their attack, they were bombarded by mortar fires, which successfully checked the bandits' advance. The next day, communist reinforcements consisting of two Battalions of Chengdu Garrison Regiments arrived. Despite absolute numerical inferiority, the communists decided to launch a counterattack on the bandits, correctly deducting that despite enjoying absolute numerical superiority, the bandits would not fight as a cohesive unit because none of them would want to fight and die for others. Just as it had occurred in the earlier two battles, the bandits behaved exactly as the communists had predicted and despite having five thousands members, the bandits' offensive completely collapsed and every bandit started to immediately flee from the battlefield after suffering only four dozen fatalities, when attacked from both sides. As the communists begun their mopping up operation at the same night at Baihe Township, all of the seventeen bandits who failed to flee from the area were captured alive by the communists.

The communist victory of the battle of Longquan marked the end of the organized battles in the local area. Although the mopping up operation would last until end of the year, with another dozen smaller battles to be fought, all of the surviving bandits in the local area were completely eradicated by the end of the year. Political offensive and pressures from the communists played an important role in their success in that many of the bandits surrendered, and most of them was reeducated, finally switched to the communist side.

== Outcome ==
Although sharing the common anticommunist goal, the nationalist guerrilla and insurgency warfare was largely handicapped by the enlistment of bandits, many of whom had fought and killed nationalist troops earlier in the eradication / pacification campaign, and also looted, kidnapped and even killed landlords and business owners, an important faction that supported the nationalist government, but now must united against the common enemy, which is half-hearted at the best. Compounding the problem further with additional differences within the ranks of the nationalist guerrillas themselves, the futile nationalist guerrilla and insurgency warfare against its communist enemy was destined to fail.

== See also ==
- Outline of the Chinese Civil War
- National Revolutionary Army
- History of the People's Liberation Army
- Chinese Civil War
