= Wei Lihuang =

Chinese general (1897–1960)

- 衛立煌
- Born: 16 February 1897; Hefei, Anhui, Qing Empire
- Died: 17 January 1960 (aged 62); Beijing, People’s Republic of China
- Military career
- Allegiance: Republic of China; China
- Branch: Republic of China Army
- Service years: 1924–1948
- Rank: General
- Nickname: "Hundred Victories Wei"
- Unit: 14th corps
- Commands: Y-Force
- Conflicts: Northern Expedition; Encirclement Campaigns; Central Plains War; Fujian Incident; Second Sino-Japanese War; Battle of Taiyuan; Battle of Xinkou; Battle of South Shanxi; South-East Asian theatre of World War II; Burma campaign; Battle of Northern Burma and Western Yunnan; Chinese Civil War; Liaoshen Campaign
- Awards: Order of Blue Sky and White Sun
- Other work: politician

Wei Lihuang (traditional Chinese: 衛立煌; simplified Chinese: 卫立煌; pinyin: Wèi Lìhuáng) (16 February 1897 – 17 January 1960) was a Chinese general who served the Nationalist government throughout the Chinese Civil War and Second Sino-Japanese War as one of China's most successful military commanders.

First joining the Kuomintang (KMT) during the early 1920s, Wei would rise to become general after the Northern Expedition, a two-year campaign to unify China.

== Chinese Civil War ==
After the fourth and fifth encirclement campaigns forced the main Communist forces to withdraw from the Eyuwan Soviet area, the Nationalists began a series of extermination campaigns against the remaining Communist guerrillas. The Communists had strong peasant support in this region and were able to hold out against repeated attempts to wipe them out. In 1934, Chiang Kai-shek gave Wei Lihuang several hundred thousand troops to accomplish this task. Wei made use of concentration camps to deprive the Communists of peasant support. Despite occasional victories, the Communists were in the main defeated by this strategy. Most of the remaining guerrillas abandoned open warfare and began to operate undercover amongst the peasants. Until the Second United Front began in 1937, the Communists in Eyuwan remained underground. His success would earn him the nickname "Hundred Victories Wei".

== War with Japan ==
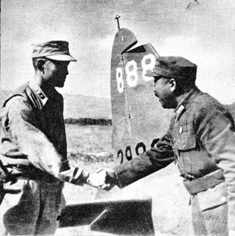
General Wei Lihuang and Lieutenant General Sun Liren at the Burmese-Chinese border, 1945

A general during the Second Sino-Japanese War, Wei commanded the First War Area. With the entry of Great Britain and later the United States in the war against Japan, he was transferred to southern China as commander of the Nationalist Chinese XI Group Army. He later replaced General Chen Cheng as commander of the Chinese Expeditionary Forces, known as Y Force. Y-Force consisted of over 100,000 Nationalist soldiers, and participated in major ground operations in support of American General Joseph W. Stilwell's offensive in northern Burma. Unlike many of his contemporaries, Wei was able to work effectively with American commanders.

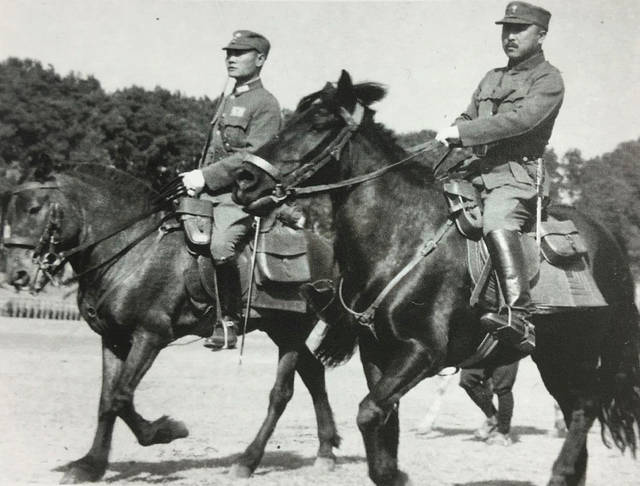
General Wei Lihuang (right) and General Long Yun (left) inspecting troops of the Chinese Expeditionary Force, March 1944

Beginning his offensive into southern Yunnan on 11 May 1944, Wei's troops captured Tengchung on 15 September after two months of heavy fighting. Proceeding southward despite heavy resistance, his forces eventually linked up with Chinese divisions in Wanting, Burma on January 27, 1945. The success of this offensive allowed the Allies to reopen the former Burma Road supply network to China through Ledo, Burma, now named the Ledo Road. In concert with existing airlift operations over The Hump, the Ledo Road enabled overland transport of military supplies from Assam to Nationalist bases in China.

== Postwar career ==
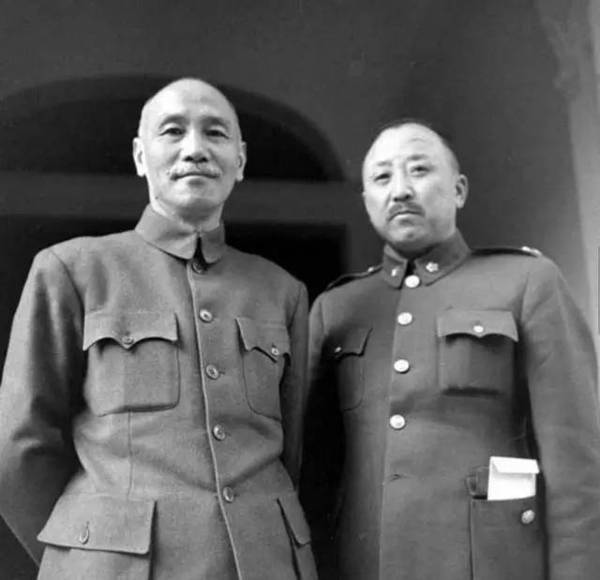
President of China Chiang Kai-Shek (left) with Wei Lihuang

Recalled to northern China to again replace General Chen Cheng following the war, Wei was placed in command of KMT forces in northeast China in October 1947. After being cut off from land communication with the KMT with the communist capture of Chinchow, Liaoning, he was supposedly planning for an offensive to recapture the Nationalist provincial capital before he was ordered to withdraw by Chiang Kai-shek. Shortly before the communist capture of Mukden (Shenyang), Wei would return to southern China following his replacement by his field commander Du Yuming in October 1948.

In spite of Wei's earlier success, his tenure in the northeast was remarkably unsuccessful. He defied orders for more than a year to withdraw, and lost 300,000 troops. Out of that total, 246,000 were captured, and many if not most were quickly incorporated into the PLA.

Chiang subsequently ordered Wei's house arrest. Wei made his way to Hong Kong in 1949, and moved to Beijing in 1955, where he would participate in various organizations of the People's Republic. He would live in the PRC until his death in 1960.

== Bibliography ==
- Dupuy, Trevor N. Harper Encyclopedia of Military Biography, New York, 1992
- http://www.generals.dk/general/Qiu_Qing-quan/_/China.html
- Ministry of National Defense R.O.C
- US Naval War College
- Taylor, Jay (2009). The Generalissimo: Chiang Kai-Shek and the Struggle for Modern China. New York.
- http://cgsc.leavenworth.army.mil/carl/download/csipubs/bjorge_huai.pdf
- Rowe, William T (2007). Crimson Rain: Seven Centuries of Violence in a Chinese County. Stanford, California: Stanford University Press.
- Benton, Gregor (1992). Mountain Fires: The Red Army's Three-year War in South China, 1934-1938. Los Angeles: University of California Press.
