= Battle of Shuangqiaozhen =

- Part of the Chinese Civil War
Date	March 6–12, 1931
Location	Xinyang, Henan Province
Result	Communist victory

Belligerents
Republic of China National Revolutionary Army	Chinese Workers' and Peasants' Red Army

Commanders and leaders
Major General Yue (POW)	

Strength
~8,000	30,000

The Battle of Shuangqiaozhen (Chinese: 雙橋鎮戰鬥) was fought from March 6 to March 12, 1931, between the 34th Division of the Army of the Kuomintang Nationalist Government and the Fourth Red Army of the Chinese Communist Party. It took place during the second encirclement campaign against the Eyuwan Soviet. The commander of the 34th Division, Major General Yue (a descendant of Song dynasty general Yue Fei) was captured by the communists. In August 1932, Yue was executed by firing squad on the orders of Zhang Guotao and posthumously promoted to full general.

== See also ==
- Outline of the Chinese Civil War

== Bibliography ==
- 中華民國國防大學編，《中國現代軍事史主要戰役表》[1]（台灣國防部史政檔案開放應用系統）
- 原中華民國國軍政戰學校、美軍顧問團史政處，《中國現代軍事史主要戰役表-陸軍》
