= Third encirclement campaign against the Eyuwan Soviet =

1931 Military campaign against the Eyuwan Soviet.

- Part of the Chinese Civil War
| Date | November 1931 – June 17, 1932 |
| Location | Hubei–Henan–Anhui border region, China |
| Result | Communist victory |

Belligerents
| Nationalist China | Chinese Red Army |

Commanders and leaders
| Chiang Kai-shek; Li Shiding (厉式鼎) | Xu Xiangqian; Zhang Guotao |

Strength
| 100,000+ | 30,000 |

Casualties and losses
| 60,000 | Low |

The third encirclement campaign against the Eyuwan Soviet was an encirclement campaign launched by the Chinese Nationalist Government against the Communist base in the Hubei–Henan–Anhui border region, the Eyuwan Soviet. The Fourth Red Army responded with its third counter-encirclement campaign, which successfully defended the soviet. The Nationalist attacks lasted from November 1931 to 17 June 1932.

== See also ==
- Chinese Civil War
- Outline of the Chinese Civil War
- National Revolutionary Army
- Chinese Red Army
- Encirclement campaigns against the Eyuwan Soviet
  - First encirclement campaign against the Eyuwan Soviet
  - Second encirclement campaign against the Eyuwan Soviet
  - Fourth encirclement campaign against the Eyuwan Soviet
  - Fifth encirclement campaign against the Eyuwan Soviet
