= Fifth encirclement campaign against the Eyuwan Soviet =

1933 military campaign

- Part of the Chinese Civil War
Date	July 17, 1933 – November 26, 1934
Location	Hubei–Henan–Anhui border region, China
Result	Nationalist victory •Red Army forced into retreat

Belligerents
Nationalist China	Chinese Red Army

Commanders and leaders
Chiang Kai-shek; Li Jishen	Xu Xiangqian; Zhang Guotao

Strength
50,000	7,000

Casualties and losses
10,000	4,000+

The fifth encirclement campaign against the Eyuwan Soviet was an encirclement campaign launched by the Chinese Nationalist Government against the Eyuwan Soviet, a Communist base in the Hubei–Henan–Anhui border region. It was met by the 25th Red Army's fifth counter-encirclement campaign. As with the fourth campaign, this campaign ended in a Nationalist victory. The 25th Red Army decided in mid-November 1934 to abandon the soviet area and head westwards, joining the Long March.

== See also ==
- Chinese Civil War
- Outline of the Chinese Civil War
- National Revolutionary Army
- Chinese Red Army
- Encirclement campaigns against the Eyuwan Soviet
  - First encirclement campaign against the Eyuwan Soviet
  - Second encirclement campaign against the Eyuwan Soviet
  - Third encirclement campaign against the Eyuwan Soviet
  - Fourth encirclement campaign against the Eyuwan Soviet
