= Fourth encirclement campaign against the Eyuwan Soviet =

1932 military campaign

- Part of the Chinese Civil War
Date	Early July, 1932 – October 12, 1932
Location	Hubei–Henan–Anhui border region, China
Result	Nationalist victory

Belligerents
Nationalist China	Chinese Red Army

Commanders and leaders
Chiang Kai-shek; Li Jishen	Xu Xiangqian; Zhang Guotao

Strength
300,000	30,000

Casualties and losses
10,000+	Several thousand

The fourth encirclement campaign against the Eyuwan Soviet was an encirclement campaign launched by the Chinese Nationalist Government against the Communist base in the border region between Hubei, Henan, and Anhui provinces, the Eyuwan Soviet. Although the Fourth Red Army responded with its fourth counter-encirclement campaign, the Nationalists were ultimately successful and overran the soviet area by early October 1932.

== Course of the Campaign ==
Drought, food shortages, and a major epidemic had weakened the Eyuwan Soviet going into 1932. From July to September 1932, Chiang Kai-shek ordered 300,000 troops of the National Revolutionary Army to begin the fourth encirclement campaign. The Communists positioned their 25th Army to defend the east while the main force of the Fourth Red Army was located to the west. Although it was able to inflict about the same amount of casualties on the nationalist forces as it suffered itself, this loss rate was unsustainable against a superior force. National General Xia Douyin led a scorched earth campaign, killing all men found in the Soviet areas, burning all buildings, and seizing or destroying all crops. Historians such as Marc Opper and Chen Yao-huang argue that a major factor in the Fourth Red Army's defeat was its decision to adopt more conventional tactics. The mass of the peasantry was unfriendly to Nationalists and so Nationalist armies had to rely on local elites to provide food, a method that was unreliable and made them vulnerable to supply problems. The Communists failed to capitalize on this logistical weakness when they decided not to fight a guerrilla war.

However, the Nationalist victory was incomplete because they had concluded the campaign too early in their jubilation. The Fourth Red Army retreated to border region between Shaanxi and Sichuan, leaving behind a small force to carry out guerrilla warfare. Moreover, the remnant local Communist force of the Eyuwan Soviet was able to rebuild a guerrilla movement by taking advantage of the early Nationalist withdrawal. They hid in the mountains and eked out a living by foraging and organizing poor peasants to seize grain kept by landlords and public granaries. Gao Jingting and Xu Haidong became the de facto leaders of the largest force left behind, the 25th Red Army. They were successful at preserving a Communist presence in the region for several more years. As a result, the Nationalists had to launch a fifth encirclement campaign.

== See also ==
- Chinese Civil War
- Outline of the Chinese Civil War
- National Revolutionary Army
- Chinese Red Army
- Encirclement campaigns against the Eyuwan Soviet
  - First encirclement campaign against the Eyuwan Soviet
  - Second encirclement campaign against the Eyuwan Soviet
  - Third encirclement campaign against the Eyuwan Soviet
  - Fifth encirclement campaign against the Eyuwan Soviet

== Bibliography ==
- Opper, Marc (2020). People's Wars in China, Malaya, and Vietnam. Ann Arbor: University of Michigan Press.
- Rowe, William T (2007). Crimson Rain: Seven Centuries of Violence in a Chinese County. Stanford, California: Stanford University Press.
- Benton, Gregor (1992). Mountain Fires: The Red Army's Three-year War in South China, 1934-1938. Los Angeles: University of California Press.
- Saich, Tony, ed. (1996). The Rise to Power of the Chinese Communist Party: Documents and Analysis. Armonk, New York: M.E. Sharpe.
- Gao, James Z. (2009). Historical Dictionary of Modern China (1800-1949). Lanham, Maryland: The Scarecrow Press.
- Military History Research Department, Complete History of the People's Liberation Army, Military Science Publishing House in Beijing, 2000, ISBN 7-80137-315-4
