= First encirclement campaign against the Eyuwan Soviet =

1930 military campaign

- Part of the Chinese Civil War
Date	November 1930 – March 9, 1931
Location	Hubei–Henan–Anhui border region, China
Result	Communist victory

Belligerents
Nationalist China	Chinese Red Army

Commanders and leaders
He Chengjun (何成浚); Li Mingzhong (李鸣钟)	Xu Xiangqian; Zeng Zhongsheng (曾中生)

Strength
100,000+	20,000

Casualties and losses
>10,000	Low

The first encirclement campaign against the Eyuwan Soviet was an encirclement campaign launched by the Chinese Nationalist Government against the Eyuwan Soviet, a Communist base located in the border region between Hubei, Henan, and Anhui provinces. The Fourth Red Army responded with its first counter-encirclement campaign and successfully defended the soviet. The Nationalist attacks lasted from November 1930 to 9 March 1931.

== See also ==
- Chinese Civil War
- Outline of the Chinese Civil War
- National Revolutionary Army
- Chinese Red Army
- Encirclement campaigns against the Eyuwan Soviet
  - Second encirclement campaign against the Eyuwan Soviet
  - Third encirclement campaign against the Eyuwan Soviet
  - Fourth encirclement campaign against the Eyuwan Soviet
  - Fifth encirclement campaign against the Eyuwan Soviet
