= Second encirclement campaign against the Eyuwan Soviet =

1931 military campaign

- Part of the Chinese Civil War
| Date | April 1931 – July 1931 |
| Location | Hubei–Henan–Anhui border region, China |
| Result | Communist victory |

Belligerents
| Nationalist China | Chinese Red Army |

Commanders and leaders
| Chiang Kai-shek | Xu Xiangqian; Zeng Zhongsheng (曾中生) |

Strength
| 100,000+ | 20,000 |

Casualties and losses
| 10,000+ | Low |

The second encirclement campaign against the Eyuwan Soviet was an encirclement campaign launched by the Chinese Nationalist Government against the Eyuwan Soviet, a Communist base located in the border region between Hubei, Henan, and Anhui provinces. The Fourth Red Army responded with its second counter-encirclement campaign and successfully defended the soviet. It lasted from April 1931 to July 1931.

== See also ==
- Chinese Civil War
- Outline of the Chinese Civil War
- National Revolutionary Army
- Chinese Red Army
- Encirclement campaigns against the Eyuwan Soviet
  - First encirclement campaign against the Eyuwan Soviet
  - Third encirclement campaign against the Eyuwan Soviet
  - Fourth encirclement campaign against the Eyuwan Soviet
  - Fifth encirclement campaign against the Eyuwan Soviet
