= Xia Douyin =

Chinese general (1885–1951)

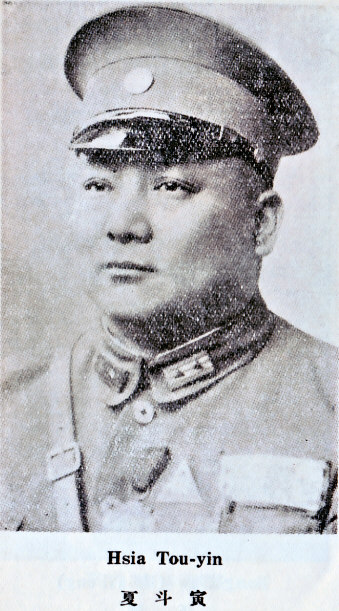
- Born: 1885; Huanggang, Hubei
- Died: 1951 (aged 65–66) British Hong Kong
- Allegiance: Qing dynasty Republic of China
- Branch: New Army; National Revolutionary Army
- Service years: 1906–1945
- Rank: general
- Conflicts: Xinhai Revolution; Constitutional Protection Movement; Northern Expedition; Chinese Civil War; Central Plains War; Second Sino-Japanese War

Xia Douyin (Chinese: 夏斗寅) (1885–1951) was a Chinese National Revolutionary Army general during the first phase of the Chinese Civil War and the Second Sino-Japanese War.

== Biography ==
He was born in Macheng, Hubei. Originally a member of the Qing dynasty New Army, he participated in the Xinhai Revolution of 1911. In 1917, he joined the Constitutional Protection Movement and opposed local warlord Wang Zhanyuan. Defeated by Wang's forces, he fled to Changsha and enlisted the help of allies in Hunan against Wang. After suffering another defeat in 1919, he fled to the border region of Hunan and Jiangxi Provinces. In 1926, he was brought by Tang Shengzhi into the National Revolutionary Army and participated in the Northern Expedition as a divisional commander. On May 17, 1927, Xia led Kuomintang forces loyal to Chiang Kai-shek from Yichang against the forces of Ye Ting in Wuhan. After his victory, he notoriously took personal pleasure in mutilating the corpses of female revolutionaries he had killed. Chiang promoted Xia to army commander and he fought in the Central Plains War of 1930. Xia was then tasked with suppressing the Eyuwan Soviet in the border region between Hubei, Henan, and Anhui provinces. He ordered the massacre of thousands of civilians but was unable to stop the Communists' expansion. In 1932, Xia was promoted to full general and made governor of Hubei, although Zhang Qun actually acted in his place. From July to September 1932, Chiang Kai-shek ordered 300,000 troops of the National Revolutionary Army to surround and suppress the Eyuwan Soviet in the Fourth Encirclement Campaign. Xia directed a scorched earth campaign, killing all men found in the Soviet areas, burning all buildings, and seizing or destroying all crops. He was ultimately successful and the main Communist Red Army was forced to retreat westwards. During the Second Sino-Japanese War, Xia fled to Chengdu after Hubei was occupied by the invading Imperial Japanese Army. In 1945, he retired from the military. Although he attempted to welcome the Chinese Communist Party (CCP) takeover of the mainland, the CCP rebuffed him and he fled to Hong Kong, where he died.

== Bibliography ==
- Rowe, William T (2007). Crimson Rain: Seven Centuries of Violence in a Chinese County. Stanford, California: Stanford University Press.
- Gao, James Z. (2009). Historical Dictionary of Modern China (1800-1949). Lanham, Maryland: The Scarecrow Press.
- Hershatter, Gail (2019). Women and China's Revolutions. New York: Rowman and Littlefield.
