= Encirclement campaigns (Chinese Civil War) =

During the Chinese Civil War, the forces of the Kuomintang conducted encirclement campaigns against the revolutionary base areas of the Chinese Communist Party (CCP). The climax of these encirclement campaigns were the five "encirclement and suppression", or "extermination", campaigns against the Chinese Soviet Republic (CSR) from 1930 to 1934. The final campaign, developed with German advisors, destroyed the CSR's Jiangxi Soviet and precipitated the CCP's strategic retreat in the Long March.

- Honghu Soviet
  - First
  - Second
  - Third
- Eyuwan Soviet
  - First
  - Second
  - Third
  - Fourth
  - Fifth
- Hubei-Henan-Shaanxi Soviet
  - First
  - Second
- Hunan-Hubei-Jiangxi Soviet
  - First
- Hunan-Hubei-Sichuan-Guizhou Soviet
  - First
- Hunan-Jiangxi Soviet
  - First
- Hunan-Western Hubei Soviet
  - First
- Jiangxi Soviet
  - First
  - Second
  - Third
  - Fourth
  - Fifth
- Northeastern Jiangxi Soviet
  - First
- Shaanxi-Gansu Soviet
  - First
  - Second
  - Third
