= Eyuwan Soviet =

1930–1932 Chinese soviet government

Eyuwan Soviet 鄂豫皖苏维埃
- Revolutionary base area of the Chinese Soviet Republic
- 1930–1932
- Capital: Chaishanbao, Guangshan County, Henan
- Government
- Secretary
  - 1931–1932: Zhang Guotao
- Historical era: Chinese Civil War
  - Established: 1930
  - Disestablished: 1932

The Eyuwan Soviet (Note: Chinese: 鄂豫皖苏维埃; pinyin: Èyùwǎn Sūwéi'āi. The name comes from the Chinese abbreviations of Hubei (È), Henan (Yù), and Anhui (Wǎn). It is also known as the Hubei–Henan–Anhui Soviet or the Eyuwan Revolutionary Base Area (鄂豫皖革命根据地第; Èyùwǎn gémìng gēnjùdì dì).) was a short-lived soviet government established in March 1930 by the Chinese Communist Party in the Dabie Mountains border region between Hubei, Henan, and Anhui provinces. At its height in 1931 and early 1932, the Eyuwan Soviet was the second-largest Chinese Soviet after the Central Soviet in Jiangxi. It improved the rights of women and redistributed land to poor and landless peasants. It was famously led by Zhang Guotao, a rival of Mao Zedong, who attempted to consolidate his control over Eyuwan with a series of purges. The Fourth Nationalist Encirclement Campaign defeated Eyuwan's Fourth Red Army in late 1932 and forced it to retreat westwards towards Sichuan and Shaanxi. The Soviet government ceased to function and the Communists retreated into the mountains. Despite several extermination campaigns intended to flush them out, the region remained a hotbed of Communist guerrilla activity until a truce was established during the Second Sino-Japanese War.

The Eyuwan Soviet recruited a disproportionate number of officers and cadres for the Chinese Communists. Even in the early 1950s, over 70% of division-level commanders and higher in the People's Liberation Army were originally from this region. Nonetheless, the Soviet's association with Zhang Guotao—who left the Communist Party in 1938 and joined the Kuomintang—has damaged its historical reputation in China.

== History ==
=== Background ===
During the mid-1920s, the Chinese Communist Party (CCP) and the Kuomintang (KMT or Nationalists) formed an alliance known as the First United Front. They launched a Northern Expedition in 1926 that would eventually re-unify the Republic of China and defeat the Beiyang Clique. One of the tactics the United Front used during the offensive was the creation of militant labor unions and peasant associations. These mass organizations gave the Northern Expedition strong popular support, but antagonized conservatives within the KMT who were often landowners and capital owners themselves. In 1927, the right-wing Generalissimo of the Nationalist army, Chiang Kai-shek, ordered a purge of Communists in the areas under his control. Chiang eventually took over the KMT and extended the purge to all areas under Nationalist control. The CCP went underground and many fled to isolated rural areas where Nationalist influence was weakest.

One popular destination for fleeing Communists was the Dabie Mountains, a border region between Hubei, Henan, and Anhui provinces (the "Eyuwan" region). Many Communists were in fact natives of this region and had been sent by their parents to study in the cities. By returning to their native region, they could count on family ties as a recruitment tool. But while the rugged terrain gave them shelter from the Nationalist armies, it provided the same benefit for bandit gangs. The highlands of Eyuwan had been plagued by roaming bandits for centuries, leading local communities to develop strong self-defense organizations known as Red Spear Societies. There was considerable local variation between different Red Spear Societies; in western Henan they were hardly distinguishable from bandits themselves, whereas in the east they were fiercely loyal to the local gentry. But in both cases, they were initially hostile to the Communists. Other difficulties included the fact that the Communists were operating north of the Yangtze river, which cut them off from the majority of Communist bases and strongholds to the south. They had to recruit most of their party members locally, unlike the Jiangxi-Fujian Soviet that received numerous Communist refugees from the cities. This in turn had benefits and drawbacks. Ties of solidarity between party members in Eyuwan were high, but they lacked an education in party principles or doctrine and the leaders often acted autocratically.

=== Foundation of the Soviet ===
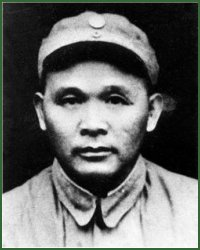
Xu Haidong, the founder of the first Communist army unit in the Eyuwan region

The first "peasants' government" in the Eyuwan region was founded in Huang'an County in November 1927. There, Xu Haidong also founded the Seventh Red Army with a handful of recruits. However, the Communists remained mobile, having to stay on the run from Nationalist armies. They slowly built up a following in the counties of Huang'an, Macheng, and Guangshan as the army passed through villages, organizing peasants as it went. They were helped by the fact that the Nationalists could not devote their full military strength to crushing the Communists. They were dealing with the Chiang-Gui War and the rebellion of a local officer in Macheng. In the summer of 1929, the consolidated their first permanent territory in Macheng near the mountain pass of Songziguan (松子关). From here, they were able to start land redistribution. The Nationalists under General Xia Douyin retook some of this territory from the Communists and massacred thousands of civilians, but were ultimately unable to stop the Communists' expansion. In mid-1929, Li Lisan became de facto leader of the Chinese Communist Party. His "Li Lisan line" called for immediate attacks on major cities. However, unlike other soviets Eyuwan was still considered too small to serve as a base for one of these attacks. Local Communists were instead instructed to start trying to govern territory and stockpile food in preparation for a future assault on the cities. The latter policy eroded popular support among some peasants, who were already hard-pressed economically. During this period, the Communists launched uprisings and established soviets to govern towns and villages across Eyuwan.

Starting in February 1930, the Communists started to consolidate these local soviets into a single base area. The Eyuwan Soviet was established in June, governing an area of over a million people. The army divisions were combined into the First Red Army under Xu Jishen, which grew from two thousand to five thousand men. The First Red Army successfully defeated the First and Second Encirclement Campaigns against the Eyuwan Soviet. In January 1931, the First Red Army was combined with the Fifteenth Red Army to form the Fourth Red Army, under the command of Xu Xiangqian. The Fourth Red Army numbered twenty thousand soldiers.

=== Leadership struggles ===
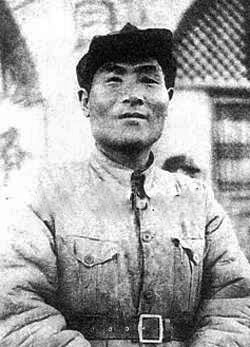
Although he was only its leader for a year and a half, the Eyuwan Soviet has since been strongly associated with Zhang Guotao.

The Communist Party's factional disputes increasingly involved Eyuwan as the soviet grew larger and more important. The first of these followed the ousting of Li Lisan. Li's influence waned in the second half of 1930 after the plan to attack cities ended in costly failure. The first high-level party member appointed to lead Eyuwan, Zeng Zhongsheng, arrived in September. He attempted to take a moderate position between Li and Li's critics. During his term the soviet fended off two Nationalist suppression campaigns and the Fourth Red Army grew to 15,000 men. In March, the Fourth Red Army won the Battle of Shuangqiaozhen and captured a Nationalist Major General Yue (a descendant of Song Dynasty general Yue Fei). By early 1931, however, Li had been completely ousted and his successors decided that Zeng was too closely associated with Li and needed to go. Wang Ming and the 28 Bolsheviks, the new faction in power, sent Zhang Guotao, Shen Zemin, and Chen Changhao to Eyuwan to take over.

Zhang came into immediate conflict with the leaders of the Fourth Red Army. Xu Jishen and the other commanders wanted to seize the breadbasket counties in eastern Hubei to fix Eyuwan's chronic food shortages. Zhang compared the plan to Li Lisan's "adventurism", and when they disobeyed his orders and took the land anyways, he got permission from the Central Committee to make Chen Changhao political commissar of the Fourth Red Army. Zhang and Chen accused the Fourth Red Army was acting like a "warlord-bandit" force, pillaging the countryside and rejecting proper discipline. Zhang and Chen then purged the army of hundreds of alleged traitors, including Xu.

Zhang's purges expanded during the second half of 1931. Thousands or tens of thousands of party members were arrested and accused of being part of the Reorganizationists, the Anti-Bolshevik League, or the Third Party. In some counties, Zhang even set up secret police. Zhang's main justification for the purge was that the local party was too strongly intertwined with local gentry and the traditional rural power structure. He argued that this had prevented the party from carrying out land reform properly, and land reform under Zhang went much further than it had in previous years. Zhang appointed a Red Army officer named Gao Jingting to chairman of the Eyuwan Soviet. Gao had a reputation for brutality against rich peasants and landlords. In order to "comb out" rich peasants, any Red army soldiers who were literate were dismissed. The purges led to opposition against Zhang from wide sections of the party and peasantry. They eventually came to an end during the latter half of 1932. Soldiers who had been purged for their literacy but had stayed with the Red Army were allowed to rejoin and in some instances promoted. The overall impact and scale of the purges are disputed. Reasonable estimates of the number arrested and killed range from the low thousands to 10,000. Historian William Rowe argues that this "meant... the near final extinction of the Party's base of indigenous supporters" in Eyuwan, but most other historians disagree. Benton points out that almost all of the purged cadres were replaced with other local supporters since there were very few non-native Communists in the region. Tony Saich argues that the Red Army's continued success showed that the purges had not affected the army's fighting capacity. In early 1932, the Fourth Red Army had helped defeat the Third Encirclement Campaign and reached 30,000 soldiers.

=== Policies and reforms ===
Women played a major part in the revolutionary movement in Eyuwan from the beginning. The United Front campaigners that had arrived in the region in advance of the Northern Expedition made women's liberation a core part of their campaign. Female Communists helped organize labor strikes and founded women's associations that challenged the patriarchal family structure and the oppression against women. One of the most potent symbols of the women's revolution was bobbed hair, which contrasted strongly with traditional ponytails and buns. However, the radical women's movement was strongly opposed by more conservative factions of society. Warlords ruthlessly suppressed and killed radical women when they retook control of an area, and even some peasants' associations grew hostile to the women's associations over issues like divorce. The movement was crippled after the KMT's right-wing took control; prominent female revolutionaries were executed and women's associations were reorganized to bring them under KMT control. Xia Douyin was particularly notorious for the mutilating the corpses of female revolutionaries he had killed. When the Communists began to take back control of the Eyuwan region, many women's rights were restored. A female resident of Anhui later recalled that "women unbound their feet, cut their hair short, studied, and took part in public life." Many women joined the Red Army. They worked as propagandists, nurses, engineers, or clothing makers, sometimes in all-women battalions. When the Fourth Red Army had to abandon the Soviet in 1932, female Communist leader Zhang Qinqiu stayed behind to care for her dying husband. In November 1932, Zhang was appointed Director of the General Political Department of the Fourth Front Army, the highest war-time position ever held by a woman in the Chinese Red Army. She is often called the only woman general of the Red Army.

As with other Soviets, land reform was the cornerstone of the Communists' appeal to the peasantry. Even before they began to take and hold territory, Communist guerrillas encouraged peasants to protest against taxes, rent, and debt payments. Although in the early days of the guerrilla movement they lacked the means to redistribute land, they did enforce a policy where the person who lived on and worked the land would keep the crop. This helped tenants but did nothing for hired laborers. Starting in May 1929, the Communists began to go about reform more methodically. They published a "Temporary Land Law" which not only gave tenants the land they worked, but also confiscated excess landholdings from landlords and distributed them to landless peasants. The land reform process expanded gradually. At first the Communists only redistributed land from the largest landholders in the villages securely under their control. As they gained experience and strengthened their military position, more villages were included and the campaign began to target rich peasants and landholding institutions as well. The land reform process involved mass meetings, population censuses, land surveys, and campaigns against particularly unpopular gentry. Old deeds were destroyed and new ones created. Not all villages distributed land the same way; variations such as giving more land to families of Red Army soldiers were common.

The Eyuwan Soviet's reforms faced significant resistance from traditional rural power structures. Attempts to enforce women's right to divorce faced strong opposition from peasants' organizations. Many gentry joined the local institutions set up to implement land reform and deliberately slowed down the process. When rich peasants as well as landlords began to have their land targeted for redistribution, middle peasants worried they would be next. The public campaigns and struggle sessions that targeted reactionaries and local power-holders caused major strife in close-knit peasant communities.

=== Rivalry with the Central Soviet ===
At its height, the Eyuwan Soviet had a larger population than the Central Soviet, although it was slightly smaller in land area and had a smaller Red Army. After Zhang Guotao took charge in Eyuwan, his rivalry with Mao Zedong manifested as a rivalry between the two Soviets. Historian William Rowe cites a report Zhang submitted to the CCP Central Committee in which he defends his purges by claiming he was learning from the "example" of Mao's purges in the Central Soviet that had followed the Futian Incident. Despite Zhang Guotao being appointed vice chair of the Chinese Soviet Republic, the Eyuwan Soviet was so separated from the rest of the soviets south of the Yangtze that it did not send delegates to the founding ceremony. Instead, it held its own conference. Although some historians argue that this may have been partially caused by the distrust between Zhang and Mao, Benton argues it was solely due to poor communications.

=== Suppression ===
Drought, food shortages, and a major epidemic weakened the Soviet going into 1932. From July to September 1932, Chiang Kai-shek ordered 300,000 troops of the National Revolutionary Army to surround and suppress the Eyuwan Soviet in the Fourth Encirclement Campaign. The Communists positioned the Twenty-fifth Red Army to defend the east while the main force of the Fourth Red Army was located to the west. Although it was able to inflict about the same amount of casualties on the nationalist forces as it suffered itself, this loss rate was unsustainable against a superior force. Xia Douyin led a scorched earth campaign, killing all men found in the Soviet areas, burning all buildings, and seizing or destroying all crops. Historians such as Marc Opper and Chen Yao-huang argue that a major factor in the Fourth Red Army's defeat was its decision to adopt more conventional tactics. The mass of the peasantry was unfriendly to Nationalists and so Nationalist armies had to rely on local elites to provide food, a method that was unreliable and made them vulnerable to supply problems. The Communists failed to capitalize on this logistical weakness when they decided not to fight a guerrilla war. The Fourth Red Army retreated to border region between Shaanxi and Sichuan, leaving behind a small force to carry out guerilla warfare. The main force lost half of its troops during the fighting and subsequent retreat, being reduced to 15,000 men. The forces left behind began a protracted guerrilla war against the Nationalists. They hid in the mountains and eked out a living by foraging and organizing poor peasants to seize grain kept by landlords and public granaries. Gao Jingting and Xu Haidong became the de facto leaders of the largest force left behind, the Twenty-fifth Red Army. They were successful at preserving a Communist presence in the region for several more years. Nationalist extermination campaigns began to indiscriminately target the peasantry in areas where Communist influence was strong. Entire villages were burned to the ground; in one case, "3,500 people were said to have been buried alive in just one night".

The disconnected Communist bases in the Dabie mountains continued to hold out well until late 1934. However, in November Xu Haidong was defeated and fled with the Twenty-fifth Red Army towards the Shaanxi-Sichuan base area. Nationalist commander Liang Guanying (梁冠英) was given 170,000 men to exterminate the remaining guerilla forces in Eyuwan. His system of checkpoints and blockhouses failed because the Communists were able to mobilize their supporters among the local peasantry to slow construction and bypass checkpoints. Liang was replaced with Wei Lihuang. Wei had significantly more troops, and also made use of concentration camps to deprive the Communists of peasant support. Despite occasional victories, the Communists were in the main defeated by this strategy. Most of the remaining guerrillas abandoned open warfare and began to operate undercover amongst the peasants. Until the Second United Front began in 1937, the Communists in Eyuwan were on the edge of collapse.

== Legacy ==
Despite its convoluted history, the Fourth Red Army became one of the most important sources of officers for later CCP military units. It was one of the main sources of the soldiers who served in the New Fourth Army. Even by the 1950s, "70 percent of cadres at the divisional level and above in the People's Liberation Army were natives of Eyuwan." Just one county, Huang'an, was the home of over 200 PLA generals. Huang'an was also the home of Dong Biwu and Li Xiannian, both of whom would serve as President of China.

Nonetheless, the historiography of Eyuwan in the People's Republic of China was largely negative for many years. Zhang Guotao defected from the CCP in 1938 and joined the Nationalists. Given Zhang's association with Eyuwan, this greatly damaged the regions reputation and most early assessments focused criticism on the excessiveness of Zhang's purges.

== Bibliography ==
- Billingsley, Phil (1988). Bandits in Republican China. Stanford, California: Stanford University Press.
- Wilbur, C. Martin (1983). The nationalist revolution in China, 1923–1928. Cambridge University Press. ISBN 978-0-521-31864-8.
- Goodman, David (1994). Deng Xiaoping and the Chinese Revolution: A Political Biography. New York: Routledge. ISBN 9781134831210. Archived from the original on 2023-10-02.
- Rowe, William T (2007). Crimson Rain: Seven Centuries of Violence in a Chinese County. Stanford, California: Stanford University Press.
- Benton, Gregor (1992). Mountain Fires: The Red Army's Three-year War in South China, 1934-1938. Los Angeles: University of California Press.
- Gao, James Z. (2009). Historical Dictionary of Modern China (1800-1949). Lanham, Maryland: The Scarecrow Press.
- Schoppa, R. Keith (2019). "Chapter 12; Revolution Reborn: The Communists in the 1930s". Revolution and Its Past: Identities and Change in Modern Chinese History (Fourth ed.). Routledge.
- Saich, Tony, ed. (1996). The Rise to Power of the Chinese Communist Party: Documents and Analysis. Armonk, New York: M.E. Sharpe.
- Phillips, Richard T. (1996). China Since 1911. New York: St. Martin's Press.
- Opper, Marc (2020). People's Wars in China, Malaya, and Vietnam. Ann Arbor: University of Michigan Press.
- Wou, Odoric (2022). Mobilizing the Masses: Building Revolution in Henan. Stanford: Stanford University Press.
- Hershatter, Gail (2019). Women and China's Revolutions. New York: Rowman and Littlefield.
- Young, Helen Praeger (2001). Choosing Revolution: Chinese Women Soldiers on the Long March. Chicago: University of Illinois Press.
- Smedley, Agnes (1976). Portraits of Chinese Women in Revolution. New York: Feminist Press.
- Huang, Chuanhui (2016). Migrant Workers and the City: Generation Now. Fernwood Publishing.
- King, Dean (2010). Unbound: A True Story of War, Love, and Survival. Little, Brown. ISBN 978-0-316-07217-5. Archived from the original on 2023-10-24.
