= National Revolutionary Army =

Military of the Kuomintang (1924–1947)

- 國民革命軍
- Flag of the National Revolutionary Army
- Active: 16 June 1924 – December 1947
- Country: China
- Allegiance: Kuomintang
- Branch: Ground Forces; Military Police; Air Force; Air Defense Troops; Naval Component (limited)
- Type: Standing army
- Role: Ground and aerial warfare
- Size: ~14,000,000
- Part of: Chinese Nationalist military
- Engagements: Northern Expedition; Chinese Civil War; Battle of Baitag Bogd; Central Plains War; Sino-Soviet conflict (1929); Second Sino-Japanese War; World War II; Pacific War

Commanders
- Notable commanders: Chiang Kai-shek; Zhang Xueliang; Sun Li-jen; Zhang Lingfu; Yan Xishan; Feng Yuxiang; Li Zongren; He Yingqin; Bai Chongxi

Insignia
- Insignia
- Headquarters: Guangzhou (1924-1928); Nanjing (1928–1937, 1946–1947); Chongqing (1937–1946)
- Ideology: Three Principles of the People; Chinese nationalism; Republic of China nationalism; Anti-Imperialism; Majority: Conservatism (Chinese); Chiangism; Anti-communism (Chinese); 1939–1945: Anti-fascism (de jure) (Note: Close Sino-German ties also promoted cooperation between the Nationalist Government and Nazi Germany in the early-to-mid 1930s. However, despite the early diplomatic honeymoon between Nationalist China and Nazi Germany, the Sino-German relationship rapidly deteriorated as Germany failed to pursue a detente between China and Japan, which led to the outbreak of the Second Sino-Japanese War. China later declared war on fascist countries, including Germany, Italy, and Japan, as part of the Declarations of war during World War II and became the most powerful "anti-fascist" nation in Asia.); Anti-Japanese sentiment
- Political position: Right-wing (Note: Within the Kuomintang, both right-wing and left-wing factions existed, but the National Revolutionary Army was led by the right-wing Kuomintang.)

National Revolutionary Army
- Traditional Chinese: 國民革命軍
- Simplified Chinese: 国民革命军
- Hanyu Pinyin: Guómín Gémìng Jūn
Transcriptions
Standard Mandarin
- Hanyu Pinyin: Guómín Gémìng Jūn
- Bopomofo: ㄍㄨㄛˊ ㄇㄧㄣˊ ㄍㄜˊ ㄇㄧㄥˋ ㄐㄩㄣ
- Wade–Giles: Kuo^{2}-min^{2} Ko^{2}-ming^{4} Chün^{1}
- Tongyong Pinyin: Guó-mín Gé-mìng Jyun
- IPA: [kwǒ.mǐn kɤ̌.mîŋ tɕýn]

The National Revolutionary Army (NRA; Chinese: 國民革命軍) was the military arm of the Kuomintang (KMT) from 1924 until 1947.

The NRA was formed in 1924 from the Cantonese military forces that supported Sun Yat-sen and the KMT. Through assistance from the Soviet Union (USSR), it was reorganized into an instrument for the KMT to unify China during the Warlord Era, which was to be achieved through an eventual Northern Expedition to defeat the northern warlords and place the country under KMT rule.

With the success of the Northern Expedition and the nominal reunification of China under the KMT in 1928, the NRA functioned as the de facto armed forces of the Republic of China (ROC). This lasted until the promulgation of the 1947 Constitution of the ROC, which established de jure civilian control over the military, and the NRA was reorganized into the Republic of China Armed Forces.

The NRA saw action in major conflicts, including the Northern Expedition, the Chinese Civil War, and the Second Sino-Japanese War.

== Etymology ==
The name National Revolutionary Army was formally adopted by the KMT following the party's reorganization under Sun Yat-sen, emphasizing its goal of national unification through revolution. Prior to 1928, the force was often referred to simply as the Revolutionary Army (革命軍), reflecting its role in overthrowing regional warlords during the Northern Expedition.

After the formal unification of China under the Nationalist government in 1928, the term National Army (國軍) became more common in official discourse, signifying its position as the regular armed forces of the ROC.

In Western historiography, the force, particularly the ground arm, has been frequently referred to as the Chinese Nationalist Army to distinguish it from communist military forces. Meanwhile, media and historical narratives originating from the People's Republic of China often describe it as the Kuomintang Army (国民党军), underscoring its affiliation with the KMT rather than the state.

It is worth noting that, in traditional Chinese usage, the term "army" (軍) has often been applied more broadly to refer to the entire armed forces, encompassing the army, navy, and air force. This linguistic nuance is also reflected in the naming of the National Revolutionary Army, which, despite its initial composition being primarily ground forces, gradually came to include the early development of the Nationalist government's air force, air defence units, and other military branches. It was not until the establishment of the Republic of China Armed Forces in 1947 that the government formally adopted the Western, particularly American, convention of using the term Armed Forces to refer collectively to the three services.

It should also be noted that within the NRA, the ground forces—excluding specialised branches such as the military police and air defence troops—were indeed referred to in Chinese as the Land Forces (陸軍). However, there was no unified or independent General Command specifically overseeing the land force branch in the modern sense; operational command structures were often decentralised and campaign-based, rather than managed through a distinct army headquarters.

== Composition ==
Before the outbreak of the war against Japan, the term "National Revolutionary Army" (NRA) primarily referred to the core, centrally controlled military units of the Kuomintang, usually referred as the "Central government forces" (中央軍), especially those loyal to Chiang Kai-shek. However, as the war escalated and the need for national unity grew, the title "NRA" was symbolically extended to include former warlords' armies and regional forces, colloquially known as "Regional forces" (地方軍), even though many of them remained semi-autonomous and only nominally under the Military Affairs Commission.

In particular, during the Second Sino-Japanese War, the armed forces of the Chinese Communist Party were nominally incorporated into the National Revolutionary Army (while retaining separate commands), forming the Eighth Route Army and the New Fourth Army, but they broke away to form the People's Liberation Army shortly after the end of the war.

With the promulgation of the Constitution of the Republic of China in 1947 and the de jure end of the KMT party-state, the National Revolutionary Army was renamed the Republic of China Armed Forces, with the bulk of its forces forming the Republic of China Army, which retreated to the island of Taiwan in 1949.

== History ==
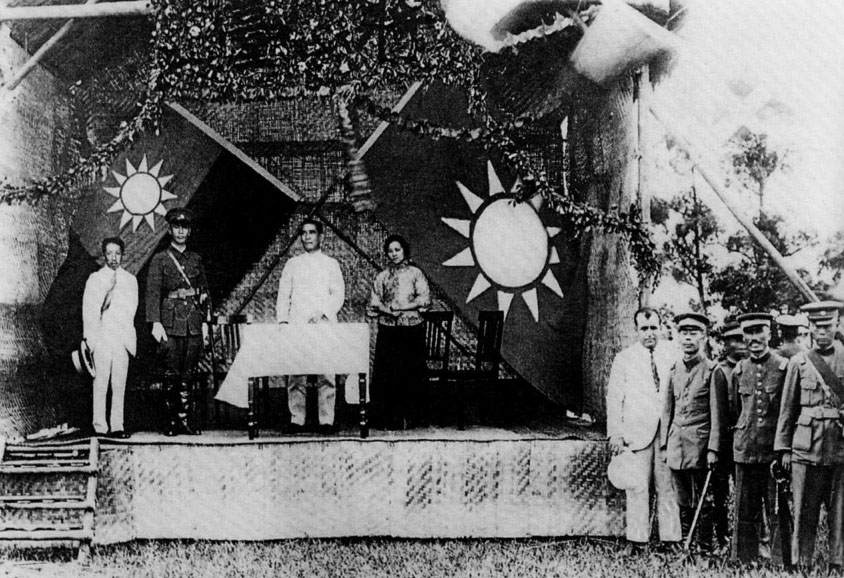
The opening ceremony of the Whampoa Military Academy, June 16, 1924. On the podium, from left to right: Liao Zhongkai, Chiang Kai-shek, Sun Yat-sen and Soong Ching-ling. Below the podium, the first one from the left in white suite is Two-Gun Cohen.

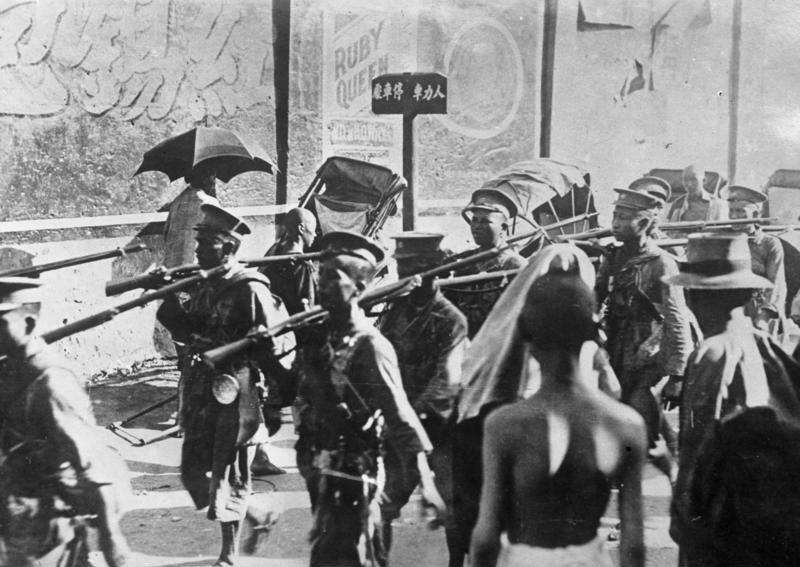
National Revolutionary Army troops prepare to siege Shanghai against Sun Chuanfang's forces.

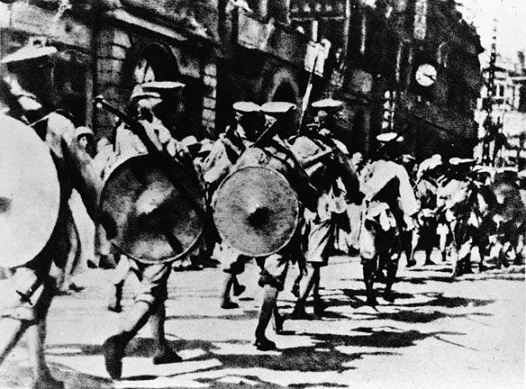
National Revolutionary Army soldiers march into the British concessions in Hankou during the Northern Expedition.

On 1 September 1917, the Kuomintang, under the leadership of Sun Yat-sen, established the Constitutional Protection Junta in opposition to the Beiyang government, following the launch of the Constitutional Protection Movement on 17 July 1917.

The National Revolutionary Army (NRA) was officially formed in 1924 by the Kuomintang as its military arm, based on pro-Nationalist regional forces and supported by foreign assistance. Its primary mission was to reunify China, beginning with the Northern Expedition.

With organisational support from the Comintern and ideological guidance from Sun Yat-sen's Three Principles of the People, the NRA developed as an extension of the party-state system, where the separation between political party, military, and government remained blurred. Many of the NRA's officer corps were graduates of the newly established Whampoa Military Academy, including its first commandant, Chiang Kai-shek. Chiang rose to become commander-in-chief in 1925 and subsequently led the NRA during the Northern Expedition.

The successful conclusion of the Northern Expedition in 1928 is widely considered to mark the end of the Warlord Era in China, although localised warlord activity continued in some regions for years afterwards. Prominent generals who later rose to distinction within the NRA included Tu Yü-ming and Chen Cheng.

In 1927, after the collapse of the First United Front between the Kuomintang and the Chinese Communist Party, the KMT leadership carried out a purge of its leftist members and significantly reduced Soviet influence within the party. Following this realignment, Chiang Kai-shek turned to Germany—then governed by the Weimar Republic—for assistance in reorganising and modernising the NRA.

Despite restrictions imposed by the Treaty of Versailles, which barred German military advisers from officially serving in combat roles abroad, the Weimar Republic did dispatch advisors to China. Chiang initially sought assistance from high-profile generals such as Erich Ludendorff and August von Mackensen, but these requests were declined. German authorities feared that the involvement of such well-known figures would provoke backlash from the Allies and diminish national prestige, especially if they were seen acting in the capacity of mercenaries.

=== Northern Expedition (1926–1928) ===
The Northern Expedition was a military campaign launched by the National Revolutionary Army (NRA) in July 1926, with the goal of defeating the warlords of the Beiyang government and unifying China under Nationalist control. The expedition was led by Generalissimo Chiang Kai-shek, who had risen to prominence after heading the Whampoa Military Academy.

Initially supported by a united front with the Chinese Communist Party and Soviet advisers such as Mikhail Borodin and Vasily Blyukher, the NRA advanced northward from Canton, quickly defeating the Zhili and Hunan warlords, including Wu Peifu and Sun Chuanfang.

However, internal divisions within the KMT soon emerged. In April 1927, Chiang ordered a purge of Communists in Shanghai—an event known as the Shanghai Massacre—which marked the collapse of the First United Front and a formal split between left- and right-wing factions of the party. Chiang temporarily stepped down, but resumed leadership in early 1928 and relaunched the campaign's second phase.

By mid-1928, the NRA—reinforced by allied warlords including Yan Xishan and Feng Yuxiang—defeated the Beiyang Army and approached Beijing. As their forces closed in, the Manchurian warlord Zhang Zuolin was assassinated in the Huanggutun incident by the Japanese Kwantung Army, and his son Zhang Xueliang soon declared allegiance to the Nanjing government.

The campaign ended in December 1928, when the Northeast officially accepted Nationalist rule, effectively unifying China under the Nationalist regime and marking the beginning of the Nanjing Decade.

Despite the nominal success, true centralisation remained elusive. Many former warlords retained regional power and autonomy, sowing the seeds for future internal conflict.

=== Nanjing Decade (1927-1937) ===
Immediately following the conclusion of the Northern Expedition, the National Revolutionary Army (NRA) was significantly overextended and required downsizing and demobilisation. Chiang Kai-shek famously remarked that "soldiers are like water—capable of both carrying the state and sinking it." Official troop figures at the time listed 1,502,000 soldiers under arms, though only 224,000 of these were directly under Chiang's control. In reality, Chiang later admitted to controlling over 500,000 troops, while Feng Yuxiang, whose official number was 269,000, likely commanded closer to 600,000. Thus, the total NRA strength was probably nearer to two million men.

During the course of the expedition, the Chinese Nationalist Party (KMT) also established regional branch political councils. Though these councils were theoretically subordinate to the central political authority in Nanjing, in practice they operated autonomously and maintained their own military forces. Feng Yuxiang controlled the Kaifeng council, Yan Xishan oversaw the Taiyuan council, and the Guangxi clique controlled two separate councils in Wuhan and Beijing, led by Li Zongren and Bai Chongxi, respectively. Li Jishen, another Guangxi-aligned figure, loosely oversaw the council in Canton, while a sixth council was under Zhang Xueliang in Shenyang.

Confronted with the dilemma of how to manage these competing power centres, Chiang had two strategic options: to centralise authority gradually or to act swiftly and decisively. True to the spirit of the expedition's aim to eliminate warlordism and regionalism, he chose immediate centralisation. Using the pretext of demobilisation, Chiang began systematically reducing the military power of regional commanders while expanding and consolidating his own authority.

In July 1928, financial conferences were convened to coordinate demobilisation efforts, and both military commanders and political officials echoed support for reducing troop numbers. Chiang formally called for the NRA to be downsized to 65 divisions and worked to build political consensus for abolishing the branch councils. This initiative alarmed regional leaders, and Li Zongren later remarked that Chiang's plan appeared deliberately designed to provoke a reaction—providing Chiang with the justification to neutralise his rivals.

==== Central Plains War (1929–1930) ====
In February 1929, tensions escalated when the Guangxi clique dismissed Lu Diping, the governor of Hunan, who subsequently defected to Chiang Kai-shek. The Guangxi forces invaded Hunan in retaliation. However, Chiang countered by bribing military units in Wuchang to defect, decisively routing the Guangxi army within two months. By March, the Kuomintang expelled key Guangxi leaders— Bai Chongxi, Li Jishen, and Li Zongren—and promoted their subordinates who supported Chiang, thereby sowing internal division within the clique.

In May, Feng Yuxiang also entered the conflict, and he too was expelled from the party. Once again, Chiang used financial incentives to sway Feng's subordinates, including Han Fuju and Shi Yousan, to defect. Feng's armies were defeated, and he retreated to Shanxi, announcing his retirement from politics. By July, Chiang's forces had occupied Luoyang. Buoyed by his victories, Chiang pushed forward with a nationwide demobilisation plan and announced that the army would be reduced to 65 divisions by March 1930. This move alarmed the regional leaders, as Chiang had already stripped revenue sources from Yan Xishan, leading him to join forces with Feng and the Guangxi clique.

The anti-Chiang coalition amassed approximately 700,000 troops, while Chiang commanded around 300,000. The coalition planned to seize Shandong and contain Chiang south of the Longhai and Beijing–Wuhan railways. They aimed to advance along the railway lines, capturing Xuzhou and Wuhan, while southern forces moved north to establish a link-up.

The war involved more than one million soldiers, with roughly 300,000 casualties. Despite being outnumbered, Chiang's southern forces performed well, routing the Guangxi-aligned armies by July. However, his northern units suffered defeats, and Chiang narrowly escaped capture in June. The northern advance halted only after the southern forces were crushed.

Chiang used the ensuing lull to regroup and launch counteroffensives along key railway lines. With fighting in Bengbu subsiding by September, Chiang began closing in again on Loyang. These developments, combined with strategic bribery, convinced Zhang Xueliang to side with Chiang, bringing the war to an end.

==== Encirclement Campaigns (1929–1934) ====
Following the conclusion of the Northern Expedition and the unification of China under the Nationalist government, Chiang Kai-shek turned his attention to eliminating the growing Communist presence in rural China. From 1929 to 1934, the Nationalist government launched a series of large-scale military operations, known as the encirclement campaigns, to crush Communist-controlled revolutionary base areas, most notably the Jiangxi Soviet and Eyuwan Soviet.

The first wave of campaigns began as regional offensives targeting smaller Soviets, such as those in Honghu, Hunan–Jiangxi, and Hubei–Henan–Shaanxi. Early attempts were poorly coordinated and often relied on local warlord forces, resulting in repeated defeats by the more mobile and experienced Chinese Red Army. In Honghu, Communist commanders such as He Long and Duan Dechang successfully repelled multiple assaults in 1930 and 1931 despite being heavily outnumbered.

The climax came with five major campaigns against the Jiangxi Soviet from 1930 to 1934. The first four were defeated by the Red Army under Mao Zedong and Zhu De using guerrilla warfare and mobile tactics. However, the fifth campaign, launched in 1933 under the guidance of German military advisors such as Hans von Seeckt and Alexander von Falkenhausen, introduced blockhouse strategies and scorched-earth tactics. With overwhelming numbers and fortified positions, the Nationalists eventually broke through, forcing the Communists to abandon their base in October 1934 and begin the Long March.

The Eyuwan Soviet also endured five campaigns between 1930 and 1934. Though the Communists held out during the first three, they were eventually pushed out by Nationalist forces employing brutal scorched-earth tactics in the fourth and fifth offensives. Despite these setbacks, small Red Army remnants like the 25th Army under Xu Haidong continued guerrilla resistance and later linked up with main Communist forces during the Long March.

Though the Nationalists ultimately succeeded in dismantling the Soviet base areas by 1934, their victories were temporary. The campaigns demonstrated both the vulnerability and resilience of Communist forces, who would return stronger in the following years.

=== Second Sino-Japanese War (1937-1945) ===
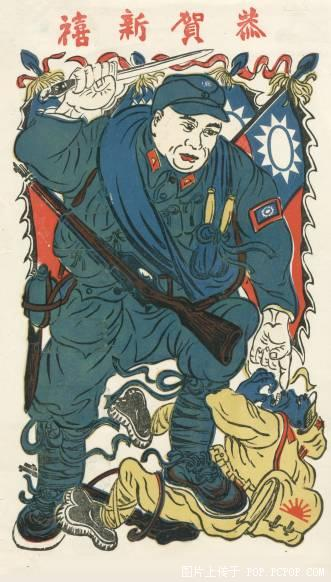
A Chinese propaganda poster depicting the National Revolutionary Army.

The Second Sino-Japanese War (1937–1945) marked the most significant military engagement of the National Revolutionary Army (NRA), which fought the invading forces of the Empire of Japan across vast regions of China. Under the leadership of Generalissimo Chiang Kai-shek, the NRA bore the brunt of China's resistance, particularly during the early years when the Communist forces were still comparatively minor.

The war began in earnest after the Marco Polo Bridge Incident near Beiping in July 1937, which led to a full-scale Japanese invasion of northern China. Despite poor equipment and internal fragmentation, the NRA mounted tenacious resistance in major battles such as the Battle of Shanghai, the Battle of Nanking, and the Battle of Taierzhuang. At Shanghai, elite NRA units, including German-trained divisions (36th, 87th, and 88th divisions), engaged in months-long street fighting, attempting to impress foreign powers and gain diplomatic support. The defence of Nanjing was ultimately overwhelmed, resulting in the Nanjing Massacre, where Japanese troops committed extensive atrocities.

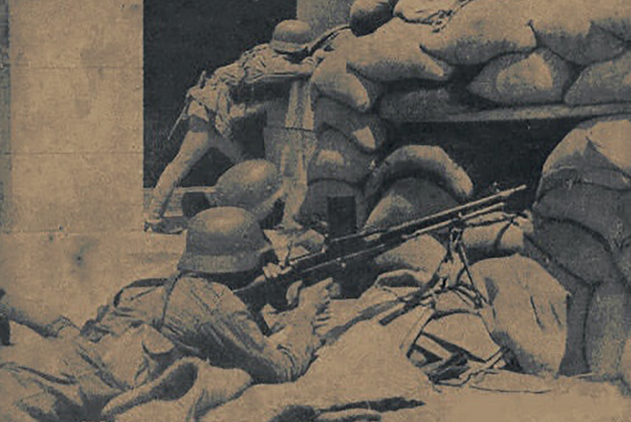
Chinese Nationalist Army Soldiers in Shanghai

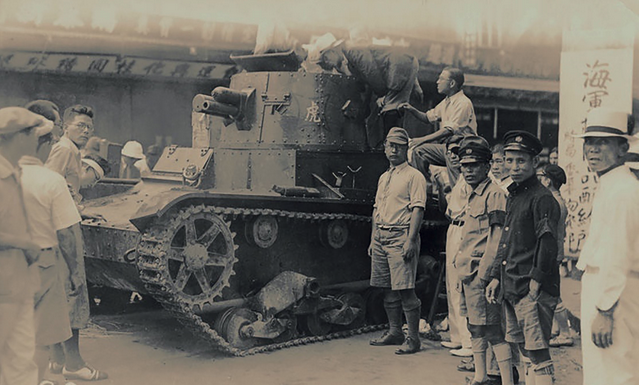
Vickers 6-ton Light Tank with the Chinese Nationalist Army

After the fall of Nanking, the NRA re-established its headquarters in Chongqing, which served as the wartime capital until 1945. While conventional engagements became increasingly difficult due to Japanese air superiority and mechanised mobility, the NRA retained control over much of western and interior China. It secured some critical victories, notably at Taierzhuang in 1938 and in defending Changsha during multiple Japanese offensives.

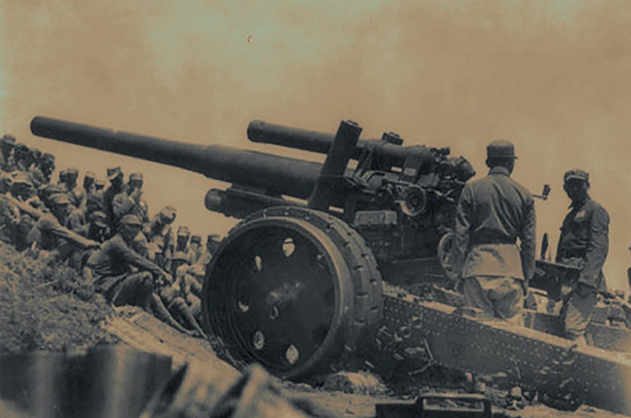
sFH18 Howitzer with the Chinese Nationalist Army Field Artillery Troops

Women also contributed to the war effort through formal units such as the Guangxi Women's Battalion, encouraged by Soong Mei-ling, Chiang's wife.

Despite internal political challenges, the NRA integrated multiple regional forces and provincial warlord armies into its ranks. As Japanese occupation expanded across coastal China, guerrilla and irregular operations were increasingly important in contested regions. However, logistical weaknesses, inadequate modern arms, and a fragmented command structure hampered sustained offensives. The lack of centralised discipline also led to issues such as corruption, press-ganging of rural populations, and logistical failure.

From 1938 onward, foreign aid helped improve NRA capability. Initially, the Soviet Union supported the NRA with matériel, training, and volunteer aviators under the Sino-Soviet Non-Aggression Pact. From 1941, the United States became the chief backer of the NRA via Lend-Lease, although this support was complicated by strained relationships between General Chiang and American commanders, particularly General Joseph Stilwell. While Stilwell was appointed as Chief of Staff to Chiang and oversaw training efforts for modernised NRA units (known as the "X Force"), he clashed frequently with Chinese leadership over strategy and control. The US government threatened to cut off aid to China unless they handed over command of all Chinese forces to the US. Chiang stalled on fulfilling the American demand as he claimed that that would be make him no different from the Japanese puppet authorities. By the end of the war, US influence over China was greater than any foreign power in the last century, with American personnel appointed in military, economic and political field, such as the American Chief of Staff of the Chinese military, American management of the Chinese War Production Board and Board of Transport, SACO trainers of Chiang's secret police, Patrick Hurley's management of political unification, and Chiang's American personal advisor. Sir George Sansom, British envoy to the US, reported that many US military officers saw US monopoly on Far Eastern trade as a rightful reward for fighting the Pacific war, a sentiment echoed by US elected officials.

During the Burma Campaign, NRA troops formed the core of the Chinese Expeditionary Force (中國遠征軍) in India and northern Burma. Under the command of General Sun Li-jen, these forces succeeded in recapturing key territory and securing the Ledo Road, a vital supply line into China. The reoccupation of northern Burma and eventual linking up with Yunnan–based forces under General Wei Lihuang restored overland logistics to Chongqing by late 1944.

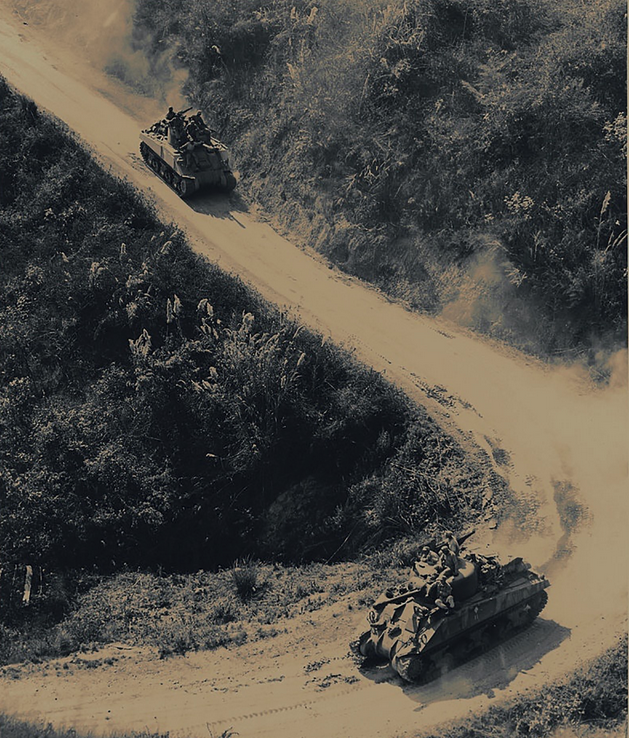
Chinese Nationalist Army Sherman Tank in Burma

One of the most ambitious and controversial NRA campaigns was the counteroffensive to Operation Ichi-Go in 1944–1945. Though the Japanese initially made gains, the NRA halted further advances by mid-1945 and began to reclaim territory in Hunan and Guangxi. Plans were underway for an American-assisted push to retake Canton and advance on Shanghai before the Japanese surrender rendered these operations moot.

Throughout the conflict, the NRA suffered enormous losses. Its sacrifices contributed significantly to tying down large portions of the Japanese Army, which in turn relieved pressure on Allied forces in the Pacific theatre. Nonetheless, internal dissent, fragmented authority, and post-war disillusionment set the stage for the resumed civil conflict with the Communists.

=== Reorganization into the R.O.C Armed Forces ===
By the end of the war, under the 1947 Constitution of the Republic of China, the National Revolutionary Army was formally disbanded and reorganised into specialised branches under the newly established Republic of China Armed Forces.

The majority of NRA ground units were reconstituted as the Republic of China Army (ROCA), while the former military police component became the Republic of China Military Police. The Air Force and Air Defense Troops were combined to form the Republic of China Air Force. Together with the Republic of China Navy, these services constituted the unified armed forces of the post-war Republic of China.

== Organization ==
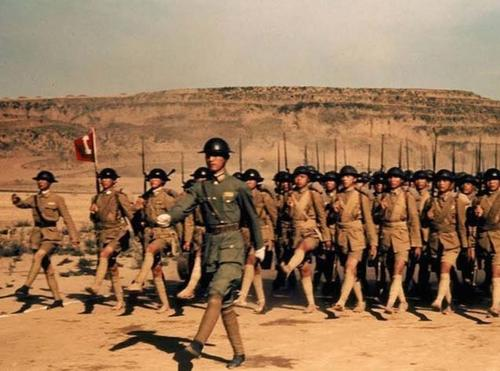
A platoon of the National Revolutionary Army marching in Brodie helmets during a parade in Burma in 1943.

Over the course of its existence, the NRA recruited approximately 4,300,000 regular soldiers. Its forces were organized into a total of 515 divisions, which included:

- 370 Standard Divisions (正式師)
- 46 New Divisions (新編師)
- 12 Cavalry Divisions (騎兵師)
- 8 New Cavalry Divisions (新編騎兵師)
- 66 Temporary Divisions (暫編師)
- 13 Reserve Divisions (預備師)

However, many of these divisions were reconstituted from pre-existing units or renamed divisions that had previously been lost in combat. As a result, not all 515 divisions existed simultaneously, and the actual number of active divisions at any given time was significantly lower.

To compensate for battlefield losses, "New Divisions" were often created and assigned the same numerical designation as the destroyed unit they replaced. The average NRA division typically comprised 5,000–6,000 troops. In contrast, an NRA field army division—their larger operational formation—might field between 10,000 and 15,000 men, making it roughly equivalent in size to a Japanese division. Even the elite German-trained divisions—considered the most disciplined and best equipped of NRA formations—rarely exceeded 10,000 personnel, and thus remained smaller than their German or Japanese counterparts.

At the apex of the NRA command hierarchy stood the National Military Council, also known as the Military Affairs Commission. Chaired by Chiang Kai-shek, the Council directed all military operations and strategic planning. From 1937 onward, the Council included high-ranking positions such as the Chief of the General Staff (held by General He Yingqin), the War Ministry, military regional commands, as well as the commands of the air and naval forces, air defence, garrison units, and logistical and support services.

Between 1937 and 1945, approximately 14 million men were conscripted into NRA service.

The National Revolutionary Army (NRA) also fielded armored units during the war, equipped with vehicles such as Sherman tanks, which supported ground operations against Japanese forces, particularly late in the Burma Campaign.

=== Command Structure ===
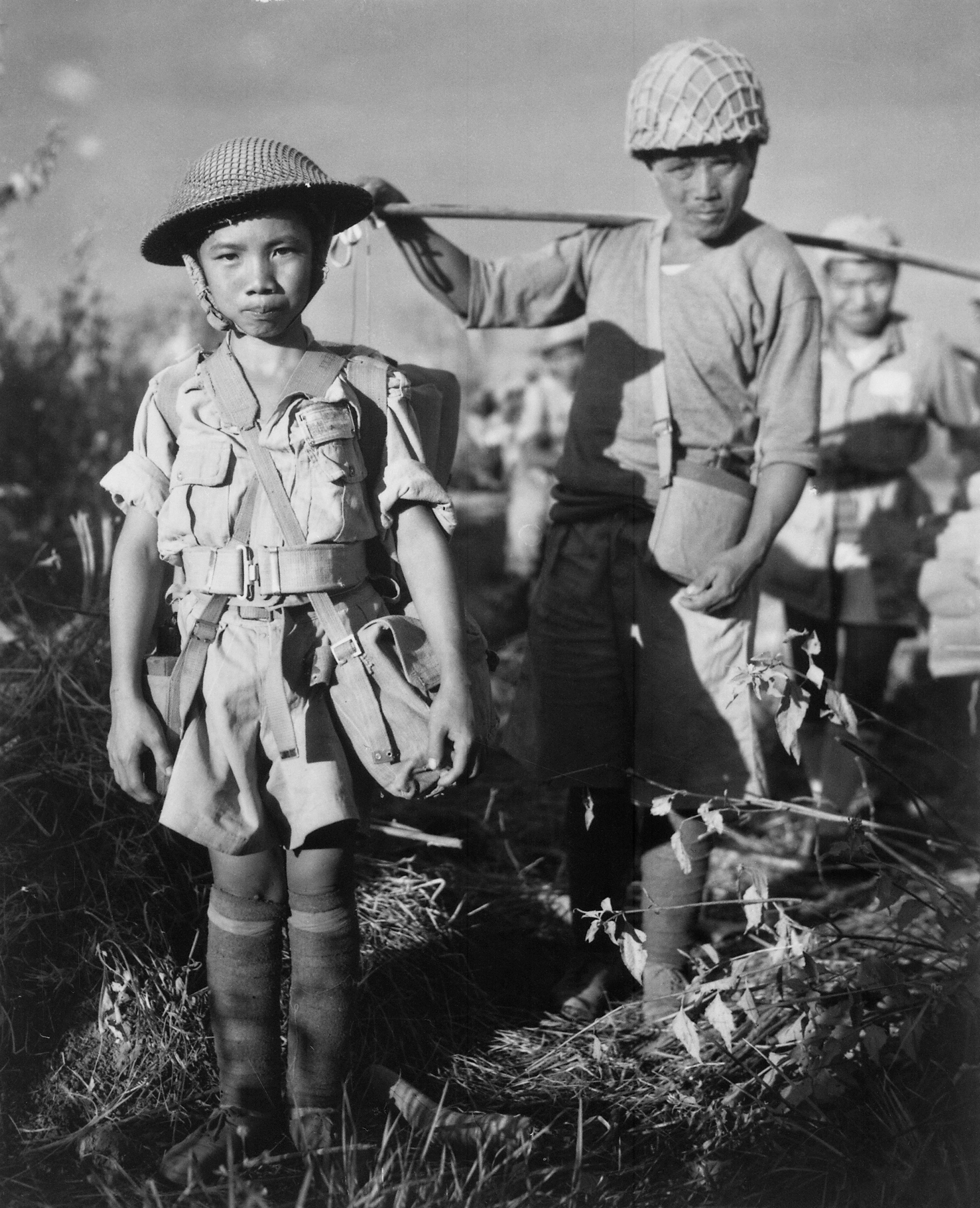
A Chinese Nationalist child soldier, age 10, serving with a division of the X Force, boarding a plane in Burma bound for China, May 1944.

The National Revolutionary Army (NRA) maintained a complex hierarchical structure throughout its existence. The following order of battle outlines the general command structure of the NRA. Units were not always directly subordinate to the one immediately above; for instance, a regiment might report directly to an army group without an intervening corps-level command.

The commander-in-chief of the NRA from 1925 to 1947 was Generalissimo Chiang Kai-shek.

- Military Affairs Commission (最高軍事機關)
  - Military Region × 12 (戰區)
    - Army Corps × 4 (兵團) – Among the largest operational formations during the Second Sino-Japanese War, each Army Corps was composed of a number of Group Armies, Armies, Corps, Divisions, Brigades, Regiments and supporting units. In terms of numbers, these formations exceeded the size of Western Army groups. Only four such corps were ever formed, primarily to coordinate the massive force concentration defending the Chinese capital in the Battle of Wuhan (1938). (See Order of battle of Battle of Wuhan.)
      - Army Group × 40 (集團軍)
        - Route Army (路軍)
        - Field Army × 30 (軍)
          - Corps × 133 (軍團) – Typically, a Corps commanded two to three NRA Divisions and occasionally independent Brigades or Regiments, as well as supporting artillery and service elements. After heavy early-war losses, a 1938 reorganisation centralised scarce assets such as artillery, transferring them from the divisional level to Corps or Army-level control. The Corps thus became the fundamental tactical unit of the NRA, roughly equivalent in manpower and firepower to an Allied Division. It is furthered divided into units of divisions (師), brigades (旅), regiments (團),battalions (營), companies (連), platoons (排) and squads (班).

=== Divisional Organization ===
The National Revolutionary Army (NRA) adopted multiple divisional structures throughout its history in response to evolving threats and operational needs. The templates used varied by year and theatre of operation. The years referred to below use the Minguo calendar, which begins in 1911; therefore, the 18th year corresponds to the year 1929 in the Gregorian calendar.

==== Post-Northern Expedition ====
Following the conclusion of the Northern Expedition on 29 December 1928, plans were drafted to reorganize the NRA into 65 divisions and 16 artillery regiments. In August 1929, the Military Reorganization Committee convened the top ranking commanders of the NRA, including Chiang Kai-shek, Feng Yuxiang, Yan Xishan, and Li Zongren, in order to establish a standardized unit structure. Chiang Kai-shek's proposal ultimately formed the basis of the planned reorganization, which called for standardizing the army around 3 division types: the Types A, B, and C.

The 18th Year (1929) Type A Division configuration was to be composed of approximately 12,500 personnel organized into:

- Division headquarters
- Two infantry brigades
  - Brigade headquarters
  - Three infantry regiments
    - Regiment headquarters
    - Three infantry battalions
  - Signal platoon
- Artillery battalion
- Cavalry squadron
- Engineer battalion
- Signal company
- Special service company

==== 60 Division Plan ====
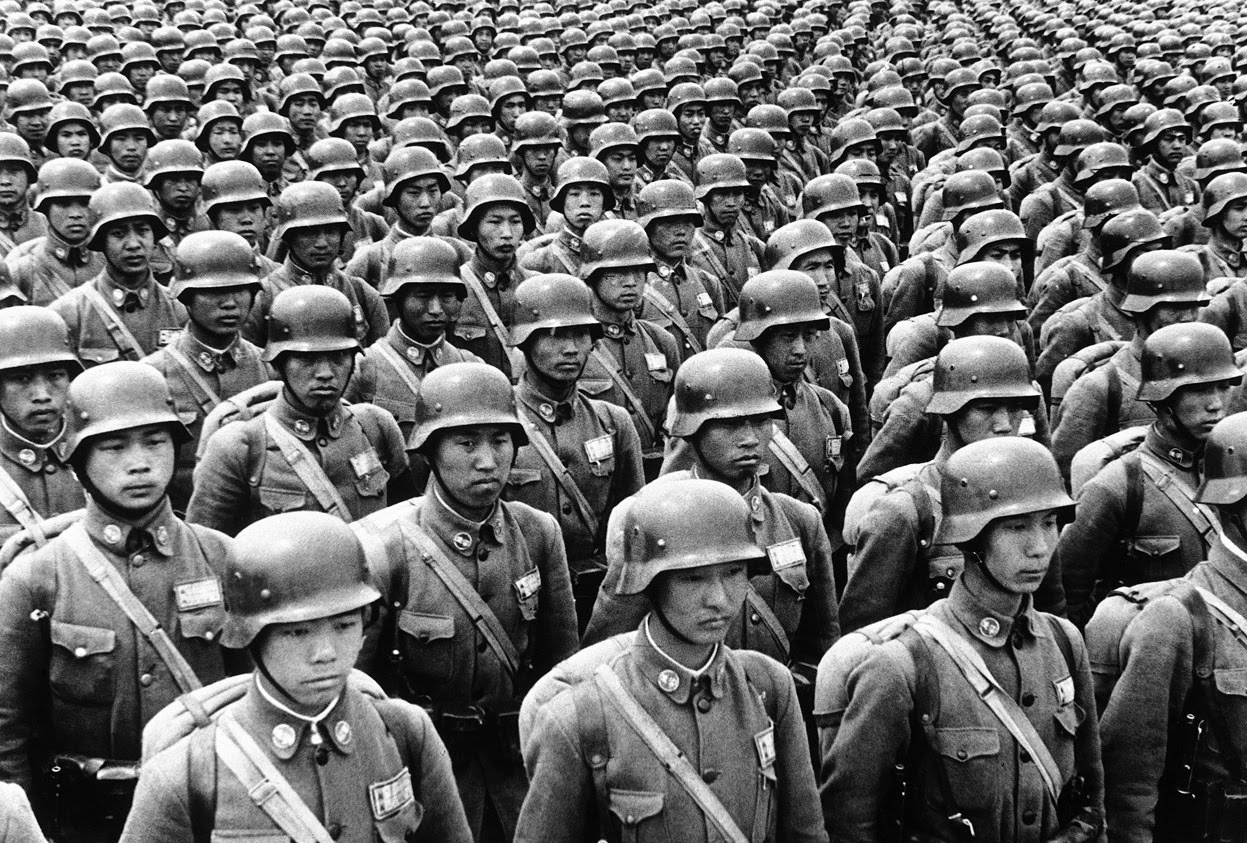
Elite German-trained soldiers of the NRA before the Battle of Wuhan.

In 1932, Georg Wetzell, acting as a military advisor to China, proposed the 21st Year (1932) Type Division to be applied to select "model divisions" to give insights into establishing a small, elite core for the Central Army of the NRA. The 21st Year divisional structure would only be applied to the 87th and 88th Divisions, trained and equipped by the Germans, but it would eventually form the basis of the later 24th Year (1935) New Type Division.

In 1935, the Military Affairs Commission, with advice from the German military mission in China, devised the "National Army Reorganization Plan for 60 Divisions " to raise 60 modern divisions along German lines. Each division was to be raised in phased 6-month batches from a corresponding divisional district, aiming to improve unit cohesion and streamline recruitment. Its officers were to be recruited on a national basis and assigned across units, breaking existing regionalist affiliations. The 24th Year (1935) New Type Division introduced under this plan was to be nearly equivalent to a Western-style infantry division, with its primary shortcoming being the absence of radio equipment. It was to be composed of approximately 9,000-10,000 personnel organized into:

- Division headquarters
- Two infantry brigades
  - Brigade headquarters
  - Two infantry regiments
    - Regiment headquarters
    - Three infantry battalions
    - Infantry support gun or mortar company
    - Signal company
    - Special Duty Platoon
  - Special Duty Platoon
- Artillery regiment (equipped with either field or mountain guns)
  - Regiment headquarters
  - Three artillery battalions
  - Special duty platoon
  - Signal battery
- Cavalry squadron
- Engineer battalion
- Signal battalion
- Transport battalion
- Special duty company

However, the plan soon ran into major logistical challenges, as China's domestic industry lacked the capability to produce the volume of artillery required for such a force, and German military imports also failed to meet expectations. As a result, mortars were adopted as substitutes.

By the end of 1935, 10 divisions had been reorganized according to new model, and prior to the outbreak of the Second Sino-Japanese War in July 1937, a further 20 divisions were reorganized. However, these latter divisions suffered shortages of modern equipment, particularly artillery.

==== Second Sino-Japanese War ====
As the war progressed and the NRA suffered heavy losses in personnel and equipment, the "60 Division Plan" was abandoned in favor of smaller, flexible units that better reflected the operational reality of protracted conflict and materiel shortages.

In 1938, divisional artillery, which had largely existed only on paper, was abolished and centralized at the army level. However, constant campaigning by the Central Army and resistance from regional warlords hindered implementation, resulting in only a few divisions being reorganized.

In 1939, the divisional structure was simplified further by eliminating the brigade echelon and an infantry regiment. This triangular divisional structure would become the standard for Chinese divisions until the end of the war, although further modifications were made. Sixteen of these divisions received anti-tank companies, while twenty were equipped with anti-aircraft companies.

The last major reorganization of the war occurred in 1942, reassigning all divisional non-combat units to the army level, and was to be composed of approximately 6,800 personnel organized into:

- Division headquarters
- Three infantry regiments
  - Regiment headquarters
  - Three infantry battalions
  - Mortar company
  - Signal platoon
- Reconnaissance company
- Engineer company
- Signal company
- Special service company

==== Y-Force ====
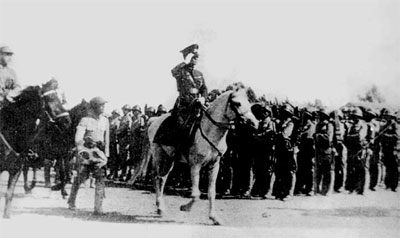
Long Yun, warlord and Governor of Yunnan, inspecting members of the Chinese Expeditionary Force.

The structure of Y-Force divisions were largely based on the 1942 division structure, but included several enhancements. These included expanded staff—particularly in communications—as well as an anti-tank rifle squad equipped with two rifles, standard issue radios, and Bren light machine guns. The number of mortars per division was increased from 36 to 54 to compensate for the limited availability of heavy artillery. Requests by the Chinese Military Affairs Commission for additional support personnel and divisional artillery were denied by American authorities, and the concept of grouping the 30 divisions into a unified Y-Force command was never realised.

Command of the Y-Force was divided among three leaders: General Chen Cheng led the largest contingent of 15 divisions, Long Yun commanded 5, and 9 divisions remained under Chiang Kai-shek's direct control. Prior to the Salween offensive, each division was allocated 36 bazookas, although actual distribution fell short due to shortages in rocket supply.

Due to the ongoing intensity of combat operations, Chinese divisions were severely under-strength. Although Chiang pledged to dispatch over 110,000 reinforcements, additional troops were not delivered in sufficient numbers. Nonetheless, Y-Force eventually expanded to over 300,000 troops, with sufficient stocks of rifles, mortars, and machine guns.

A typical Y-Force division had an authorised strength of 10,790 personnel, equipped with:

- 4,174 rifles
- 270 submachine guns
- 270 light machine guns
- 54 medium machine guns
- 27 anti-tank rifles
- 36 bazookas
- 81 x 60mm mortars
- 30 x 82mm mortars

This represented a major improvement over the earlier 1942 division model, especially in terms of equipment. Some divisions were also equipped with dedicated anti-tank companies armed with guns ranging from 20mm to 47mm calibre.

Army-level support elements included over 3,000 horses and mules, 16 trucks, 8,404 additional personnel, 21 extra machine guns, one artillery battalion (12 guns), and one anti-tank battalion (4 guns). However, due to logistical difficulties in airlifting heavy equipment over The Hump, many artillery and anti-tank weapons did not arrive until late 1943 or early 1944.

==== 30 Division Force ====
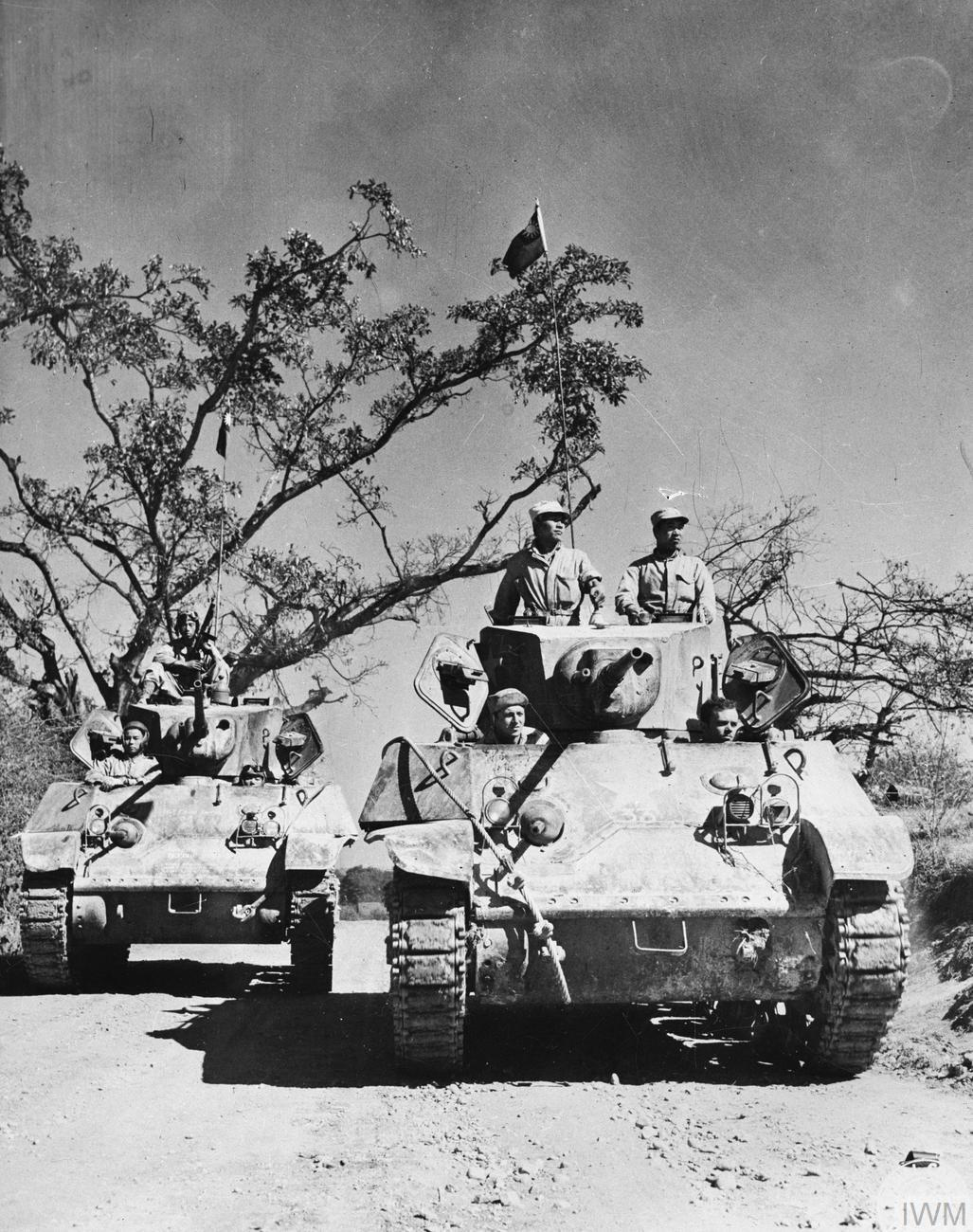
Chinese troops operating Stuart tanks in Burma—made possible by Allied logistical support in the theatre.

In May 1941, T. V. Soong, Chiang Kai-shek's personal representative to the United States, negotiated American sponsorship for the creation of 30 modern Chinese divisions in March 1941. This initiative was implemented concurrently with the formation of Y Force, the Chinese expeditionary force in Burma. General Joseph Stilwell envisioned the creation of a 90-division Chinese regular army. The initial 30 divisions were those of Y-Force, tasked with re-opening the Burma Road. This would in turn enable the training and supply of another 30 divisions via direct logistics delivery. The remaining 30 divisions were to be lighter garrison units. The remainder of the Chinese Army would be gradually demobilised or used to fill gaps and serve as reinforcements, reducing the overall demand for resources and equipment.

In July 1943, the United States War Department agreed to equip the initial 30 divisions and an additional 10% of the next batch, designated as "Z-Force". Stilwell proposed reallocating existing forces in eastern China into this 90-division structure but faced resistance from Chinese authorities, who preferred that American Lend-Lease aid be used to bolster existing units. He reiterated the plan, adding a proposal for one or two armoured divisions, all to be activated by January 1945, contingent on the opening of the Burma Road.

However, following the Cairo Conference, American and British forces failed to agree on an amphibious landing in Burma. As a result, with the Japanese still controlling the region, the Burma Road remained closed, and Stilwell's plan was ultimately shelved.

=== Armored Forces ===
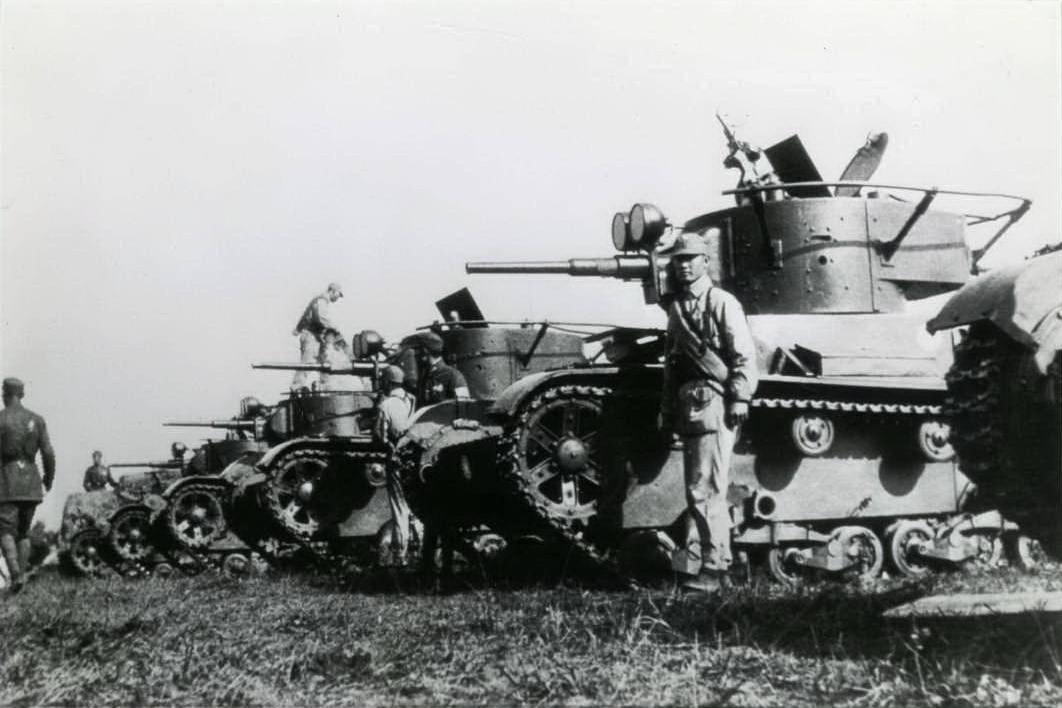
T-26 tanks of the NRA.

The National Revolutionary Army (NRA) developed its armored capabilities during the interwar years, beginning in 1929 with the acquisition of Renault FT light tanks, formerly operated by the forces of the Fengtian clique. In 1930, a tank company was formed, equipped with Carden-Loyd Mk VI tankettes. This was expanded into a tank battalion in 1934, fielding Vickers 6-ton light tanks and Vickers-Carden-Loyd amphibious tanks alongside their existing vehicles.

By the outbreak of the Second Sino-Japanese War, the NRA's mechanized force consisted of a tank battalion equipped with the existing Vickers 6-ton and Vickers-Carden-Loyd amphibious tanks, and Panzer I Ausf. A light tanks, which replaced the Carden-Loyd tankettes. It also included a motorized reconnaissance battalion equipped with Sd.Kfz. 221/222 armored cars, and a motorized anti-tank battalion equipped with 37mm Pak 36 and 47mm Böhler anti-tank guns. The mechanized force suffered heavy losses during the Battles of Shanghai and Nanjing, with the 1st and 3rd companies of the tank battalion being destroyed, while the 2nd company withdrew to Sichuan without seeing combat in the war.

In 1938, with German advisors and equipment support withdrawn under Japanese pressure, China turned to other foreign nations for aid, mainly the Soviet Union, Kingdom of Italy, and France, that supplied the NRA with T-26 light tanks, CV-35 tankettes, Renault UE Chenillette armored tractors, and Renault AMR-ZB light tanks. This enabled the NRA to raise the 200th Division, originally consisting of the 1149th and 1150th tank regiments, and the 1152nd motorized infantry regiment. The division played major roles in the Battles of Lanfeng, Kunlun Pass, and later in the Burma Campaign under General Joseph Stilwell.

The start of Lend-Lease in 1941 provided the NRA with M3A3 Stuart light tanks and M4A4 Sherman medium tanks, which were used primarily in the Burma Campaign.

=== Dare to Die Corps ===
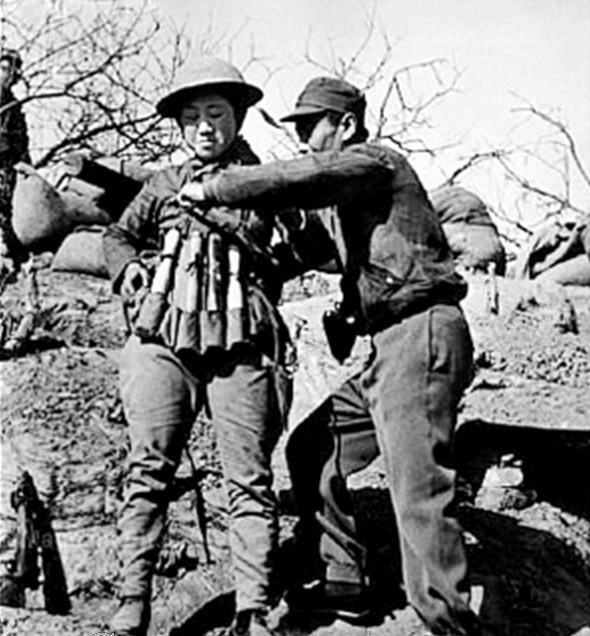
A female Chinese cadet demonstrating how to wear a vest loaded with Model 24 hand grenades during the Battle of Taierzhuang. The vest was used in suicide attacks against Japanese armoured vehicles, although this cadet was only participating in a training or publicity exercise and not in actual combat.

During the Xinhai Revolution and throughout the Warlord Era of the Republic of China, Chinese armies frequently employed specialised shock troops known as Dare to Die Corps (simplified Chinese: 敢死队; traditional Chinese: 敢死隊; pinyin: gǎnsǐduì). These units were composed of volunteers willing to undertake extremely high-risk or suicidal missions, often intended to break enemy lines or resist overwhelming assaults. The concept remained in use during the Second Sino-Japanese War, when such units were deployed against Japanese forces.

Warlords and regional military leaders commonly used "Dare to Die" troops in suicide assaults. The Kuomintang (KMT) also continued this practice. One such corps was deployed to suppress an insurrection in Canton under orders from Chiang Kai-shek.

Both men and women served in these units, often motivated by ideals of martyrdom or national salvation.

One notable deployment of such a unit occurred during the Battle of Taierzhuang, where a Dare to Die Corps was used with devastating effect against Japanese forces. These troops frequently wielded traditional weapons such as swords.

Forms of suicide bombing were also employed. At the Defense of Sihang Warehouse, a Chinese soldier reportedly detonated a grenade vest, killing 20 Japanese troops.

Chinese troops also strapped explosives such as grenade bundles or dynamite to their bodies and launched themselves under Japanese tanks in suicide attacks. This tactic was notably used during the Battle of Shanghai, where a suicide bomber halted a tank column by detonating himself beneath the lead vehicle.

At Taierzhuang, Chinese suicide troops again employed this method, charging at tanks with explosives strapped to their bodies.

In one such incident, Chinese soldiers destroyed four Japanese tanks using hand grenade bundles, sacrificing their own lives in the process.

=== Air Defense Troops ===
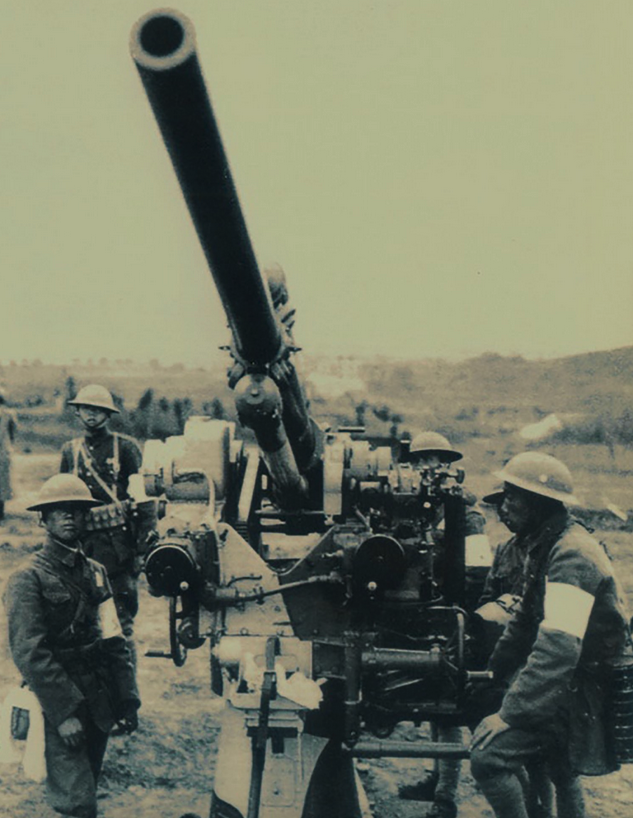
Bofors 75 mm Model 1929 with the Chinese Nationalist Air Defence Troops. The type of artillery in Service with the Air Defence Troops shot down 210 Japanese aerial targets throughout the 2nd Sino Japanese War

Established in 1934, the Central Air Defense College (中央防空學校) was the first dedicated military air defense institution in the history of China. Its responsibilities encompassed both the training of foundational air defense officers and the command and instruction of air defense forces.

Before the outbreak of the Second Sino-Japanese War, the Central Air Defense College organised nine anti-aircraft artillery regiments, which are independent entities in the National Revolutionary Army:

- 41st Regiment – Commander: Li Heng-hua
- 42nd Regiment – Commander: Miao Fan
- 43rd Regiment – Commander: Tang Chen
- 44th Regiment – Commander: Lin Chung-yü
- 45th Regiment – Commander: Hsin Wen-jui
- 46th Regiment – Commander: Yang Yü-min
- 47th Regiment – Commander: Li Shen-chih
- 48th Regiment – Commander: Wen Shan
- 49th Regiment – Pending formation

In 1943, the Air Defense Troops were reorganised under an Area Command structure:

- Area Command 1: Headquarters located in Chongqing.
  - Area of responsibility: Sichuan Province
- Area Command 2: Headquarters located in Badong.
  - Area of responsibility: Hubei and Hunan Provinces
- Area Command 3: Headquarters located in Guilin.
  - Area of responsibility: The Canton–Hankou and Hunan–Guangxi railways, as well as Fujian and Jiangxi Provinces
- Area Command 4: Headquarters located in Kunming.
  - Area of responsibility: Yunnan and Guizhou regions
- Area Command 5: Headquarters located in Xi'an.
  - Area of responsibility: Shaanxi, Gansu, Ningxia, and western Henan regions

After the drafting and implementation of the Constitution of the Republic of China in 1947, the Air Defense Troops were transformed into the air defence branch of the Republic of China Air Force, and later merged as the ROCAF Anti-Aircraft Artillery Command (空軍高射砲兵司令部) in 1949.

=== Aviation Branch ===
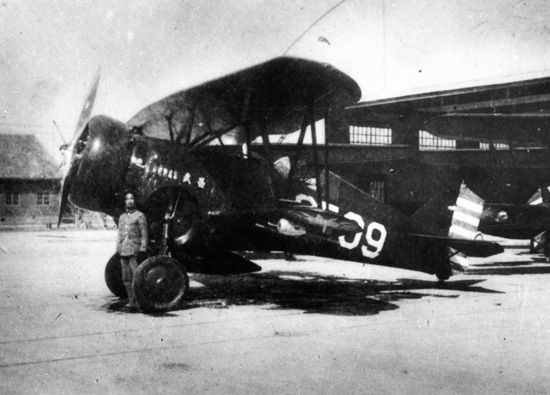
Chinese Hawk III, the primary fighter-attack of the Chinese Nationalist Air Force, opposing the Japanese invasion in 1937

As a subordinate body of the Military Affairs Commission, the Aviation Affairs Commission (航空委員會) assumed control of the Air Force (空軍).

Although the Air Force was technically part of the National Revolutionary Army (NRA), it was, in practice, largely independent from its ground forces counterpart within the military command structure of the Nationalist regime.

Throughout its existence, the Air Force maintained a distinctive institutional identity, with uniforms clearly different from those of the NRA's ground forces and a separate administrative system. In terms of pay and provisions, Air Force personnel—including not only aviation professionals but also infantry units assigned to air base defense—enjoyed treatment on par with the NRA's most trusted ground units, and far superior to that received by the majority of other NRA formations at the time.

As a result, historians typically do not associate the Air Force directly with the National Revolutionary Army, but rather regard it as an independent air service of Nationalist China, commonly referring to it as the Chinese Nationalist Air Force. Following the drafting and implementation of the Constitution of the Republic of China in 1947, the Air Force was formally established as a fully independent branch of the military and given the official title of the Republic of China Air Force (ROCAF).

=== Naval Component ===
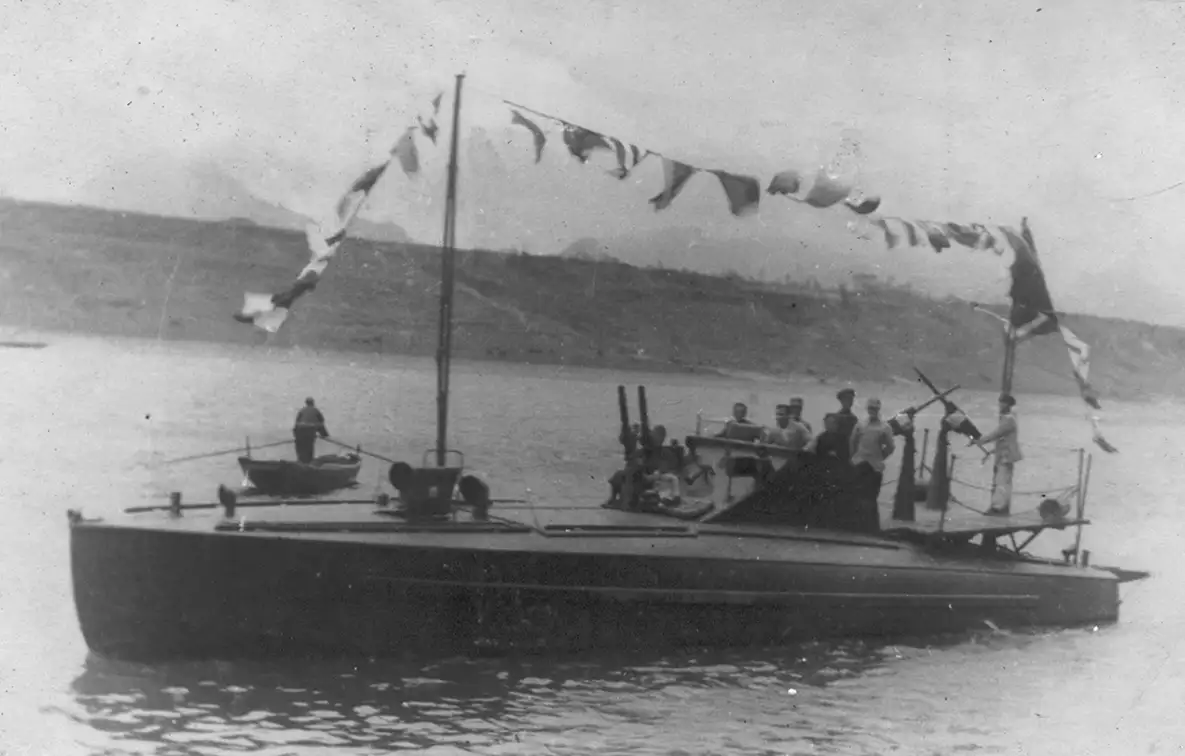
A British built CMB Motor Torpedo boat of the S.M.C. Motor Torpedo Boat Squadron

The Submarine and Motor Torpedo Boat College (電雷學校), abbreviated as the S.M.C., was established in 1932 by the Military Affairs Commission of the Nationalist government. Uniquely, the institution was not under the jurisdiction of the Ministry of the Navy, but was instead directly subordinate to the General Staff Headquarters of the National Revolutionary Army (NRA). The majority of its personnel were transferred from the Whampoa Military Academy, and the school came to refer to itself—as did others—as the "Whampoa of the Navy". Graduates of the S.M.C. were commonly known as members of the "SMC System" (電雷系). The college would later become the forerunner of the Republic of China Naval Academy.

According to prewar planning prior to the outbreak of the Second Sino–Japanese War, the S.M.C. was intended to operate not only motor torpedo boats, but also submarines. Although the Republic of China Navy did not field an operational submarine force until the 1960s, the Chinese Nationalist government had purchased five submarines from the Third Reich—one Type VII U-boat and four Type IIB U-boats—under the Sino-German military cooperation program. However, none of these submarines were ever delivered, and the agreement was cancelled following the end of Sino-German cooperation. The funds were later refunded by the Third Reich. Uniquely, this arrangement meant that had the Nationalist China acquired a submarine force before World War II, it would have been operated by the Army rather than the Navy—an organizational anomaly almost without precedent in modern military history.

In the early phase of the war, the S.M.C. operated a small fleet of motor torpedo boats, effectively functioning as an army-operated torpedo boat flotilla, which existed in parallel with the navy's own torpedo boat squadrons.

In 1938, the S.M.C. and the remaining torpedo boat forces were incorporated into the Navy Command Headquarters under the Military Affairs Commission, effectively ending the chapter of Army-managed naval operations.

=== Military Police Force ===
The National Revolutionary Army had its own military police force.

=== Muslim Units in the National Revolutionary Army ===
Among the most renowned forces within the NRA were the Muslim divisions commanded by the Ma Clique—a group of Chinese Muslim warlords and military officers who had aligned with the Kuomintang (KMT). Unlike the German-trained units that received mixed reviews from European observers, the Ma Clique's Muslim divisions, trained domestically in China without Western assistance, garnered astonishment and respect for their battlefield discipline and fierce combat capabilities. European travellers and observers such as Sven Hedin and Georg Vasel were reportedly awed by both the imposing appearance and martial effectiveness of these units. They were noted for enduring rigorous and brutal training regimes.

The New 36th Division (National Revolutionary Army), composed entirely of Chinese Muslim soldiers and trained independently within China, famously inflicted heavy casualties on a Soviet invasion force during the Soviet Invasion of Xinjiang. Despite lacking in modern equipment and numerical strength, the division fought ferociously and badly damaged the Soviet forces in battle.

One of the most prominent Ma Clique leaders, General Ma Hongkui, was noted by Western observers for leading highly disciplined Muslim divisions. Despite suffering from diabetes, Ma personally participated in training exercises with his troops and was known to engage in sword fencing drills.

As the KMT consolidated power, numerous provincial warlords and regional military leaders—including the Ma Clique—formally joined the central command structure. Upon their integration, their respective troops were reorganised into standard NRA divisions. For instance, when General Ma Qi joined the Kuomintang, his Ninghai Army was re-designated as the National Revolutionary Army's 26th Division.

== Conscription ==
=== Core NRA Units and Formal Recruitment ===
Within the centralised, core branches of the National Revolutionary Army — particularly the Central Army (中央軍), the Military Police, the Air Defense troops, and the Air Force — conscription and recruitment were far more structured and professional than often portrayed in popular accounts.

Personnel for these units were often selected based on physical fitness, educational background, or technical aptitude, with many drawn from military academies, provincial high schools, and specialised training institutions. Entry into these elite branches was considered prestigious, and recruitment often attracted volunteers. These units, directly under the control of Military Affairs Commission, maintained more regularised induction, training, and discipline procedures.

For example:

- The Military Police typically required a minimum educational level (e.g., junior high school or higher), and many came from politically vetted backgrounds.
- The Air Force required literacy, mathematics ability, and English proficiency for flight and technical personnel.

These units represented the most professionalised portion of the NRA and had far more controlled and less abusive conscription practices, especially in central regions under Nationalist administrative control and wartime rear areas.

=== Expanded Forces and Coercive Conscription ===
In contrast, the broader expansion of the NRA during the Second Sino-Japanese War — especially through the incorporation of the other former warlords' regional forces (地方軍) and local levies — led to widespread reliance on violent and inhumane conscription methods, particularly in areas far from government control.

In many rural places, military forces employed press-gangs, kidnappings, and mass roundups to meet numerical quotas. Young men and even elderly villagers were seized indiscriminately, often beaten or shackled, and marched long distances to conscription centers with minimal food, water, or rest. Mortality during transit was often high, and training camps were poorly equipped, with disease and malnutrition rampant. In some extreme cases, less than half of conscripts survived to complete basic training.

These harsh practices were especially prevalent among units not directly controlled by the central government, and among rapidly raised local militias and civil defense groups. The Nationalist Government was often powerless or politically constrained from intervening in how these regional forces filled their ranks.

These are described by Rudolph Rummel as:

This was a deadly affair in which men were kidnapped for the army, rounded up indiscriminately by press-gangs or army units among those on the roads or in the towns and villages, or otherwise gathered together. Many men, some the very young and old, were killed resisting or trying to escape. Once collected, they would be roped or chained together and marched, with little food or water, long distances to camp. They often died or were killed along the way, sometimes less than 50 percent reaching camp alive. Then recruit camp was no better, with hospitals resembling Nazi concentration camps like Buchenwald.

According to Chinese researcher Bian Xiuyue, the treatment of newly conscripted men for the NRA was extremely miserable. The conscripts often had their hands and feet bound by ropes, and was driven forward by armed troops of the NRA with whips and sticks. Chiang Kai-Shek himself had repeatedly issued orders prohibiting the mistreatment and binding of conscripts and the use of armed escorts, threatening severe punishments towards the unit and its commander responsible for conducting such acts. This was because the mere scene of marching men bound with ropes and beaten with sticks resembled as if they were common prisoners which had destroyed the conscription propaganda the Kuomintang had been carrying out. However, the practice never ceased, and many conscripts suffered from hunger and cold during the long marches towards the various war zones with some collapsing and dying on the way. More than 1.91 million conscripts did not make it to their assigned war zones, with most likely deserting and 10% or 190,000 men estimated by Bian Xiuyue to have died en route.

Even after receiving training in their respective divisional districts and being assigned to the war zones, many of the formerly-conscripted men were lost in the battlefield outside of combat reasons, with nearly 7.56 million men unaccounted as a result of desertions, demobilizations, and non-combat deaths. Bian Xiuyue estimated that of the more than 9.4 million men missing from the army, 3,554,670 died, 3,476,811 were crippled from various causes, and 2,439,131 went missing or deserted, separate from the combat casualties suffered by the NRA.

In July 1941, Jiang Menglin, leader of the Chinese Red Cross, wrote an inspection report regarding the conscription situation to Chairman Chiang Kai-Shek. He has travelled 230 kilometers from Guiyang to Dushan to see and hear first-hand the large-scale mistreatment of Chinese conscripts. Men who refused to be conscripted were killed, half-dead men were either left to die, buried alive, or shot. Dogs feasted on the corpses of dead conscripts abandoned on the road. In one case, several Hunanese men were intercepted by a NRA armed escort and forced into a truck. After successfully bribing the soldiers, the men were allowed to leave but were shot dead as they were walking away from the truck, with the soldiers claiming that they were deserting.

Of the 300 conscripts sent from Shaoguan, only 27 made it to their destination. Of the 1,800 coming from Jiangxi, only more than 150 remained, of whom only 20% were healthy enough to join the army. Of the 1000 sent from Longtan, only more than 100 were left. These statistics were confirmed by high-ranking officials, medical personnel, and instructors. In the years following the start of the war, based on the experience of doctors from the Red Cross, of every four conscripted men, one deserted, one fell ill, and one died. Only one out of four or 25% were fit for military service. According to Jiang Menglin, interviewed senior military commanders all agreed that this statistic was generally accurate. However, seeing the current situation of the conscripts, Jiang believed that the proportion of healthy conscripts had fallen to no more than 10%.

Conditions worsened for conscripts after entering the training camps, described as "akin to entering the deepest of hell". The expenses of these camps were covered by the local governments, which were only concerned with keeping the new recruits alive before handing them to their respective units. The living conditions of the recruits were largely ignored and only meager rations were allocated. Moreover, local conscription officers embezzled funds needed for the recruits' means of survival.

The conscripts in the training centers were starving, poorly clothed, and slept on the ground using straws as blankets, resulting in eight or nine of every ten falling ill. Those too ill to train or work were beaten with sticks or poles, leaving many dead or crippled. Some were even shot for trivial matters, and those unable to march due to illness were brutally beaten half to death and left to die or thrown into rivers to drown. Ordinary civilians, seeing the horrible conditions of the new recruits in the camps, dreaded enlistment. It was not uncommon for the people to see long lines of emaciated conscripts trudging along the street while chained together. Guarding them were soldiers with bayonets attached and rifles loaded as if facing the enemy. Those who attempted to escape were publicly beaten with pots. An uprising even broke out in December 1938 at Zhongjiang County in Sichuan Province due to unfair conscription lotteries and the magistrate's practice of sending more men than required to gain merit.

On August 30, 1944, after hearing from his adopted son Chiang Wei-kuo of the abuse and beating against new recruits by the Tax Police Corps at Jifang Street in Chongqing, Chiang Kai-shek, without notifying anyone else, went to Jifang Street with Chiang Wei-kuo and their entourage. Seeing an officer abusing a recruit, Chiang Kai-shek immediately ordered his entourage to summon Cheng Zerun, the director of the conscription office. Chiang Kai-shek encouraged the recruits to report any grievances over their treatment from the now-terrified officers. Horrified over the recruits' accounts of inhumane treatment and the bruises all over their body, Chiang Kai-shek immediately ordered the execution of the platoon commander who had beaten to death several conscripts just a few days prior, but regained his composure and ordered the officer sent to the Military Commission for legal proceedings instead.

After Lieutenant-General Cheng Zerun arrived, Chiang Kai-Shek immediately questioned him over the treatment of the conscripts. When the conscription director defended himself by saying that these recruits were under the jurisdiction of the Tax Police Corps of the Ministry of Finance and not the Military Service Administration, Chiang Kai-shek flew into a rage and strike the general with his cane repeatedly. Eventually, he ordered Cheng Zerun and other officers detained in the room where the corpses were kept while some of the more cruel and hated low-ranking officers were handed over to the courts.

After Cheng Zerun was imprisoned, Sichuan Army generals such as Deng Xihou, Wang Lingji, Wang Zuanxu, Tang Shizun, Pan Wenhua, and Yang Sen jointly petitioned Chiang Kai-shek for leniency and asked General Feng Yuxiang to intercede on his behalf. Chiang Kai-shek ignored all their requests and urged the Military Justice Department to execute Cheng Zerun. In July 1945, Cheng Zerun was executed by firing squad on the south bank of the Yangtze River in Chongqing, becoming the 14th and last high-ranking military officer to be executed during the Second Sino-Japanese War. He was made a scapegoat for the Nationalist government's deeply flawed conscription system, but his execution was enough to placate the people.

Hans J. van de Ven said that forced impressment was banned in the NRA, and that "after the initial wave of unrest recruitment became a difficult and unpopular but nonetheless a broadly accepted reality". The NRA totally abandoned its lottery system of recruitment and alleviated problems by giving financial support to families of recruits and focusing recruitment in regions with populations that had a history of fighting and "mercenary recruitment". van de Ven said the NRA was able to "calm social unrest" and adequately "staff their armies" after these reforms. After lottery was abolished, the NRA was able to conscript troops in Sichuan with no issues under Sichuan Conscription command when it was led by Dai Gaoxiang. Army families in Hunan were provided with rice, money, grain, pork and salt by the NRA while recruits received soap, toothpaste, towes and money. As a result, the number of soldiers recruited in Hunan was over its quota. The NRA also paid for children's education, bruail expenditures and cancelled corvee labour and surtaxes for army families in Zhejiang, in addition to providing them with money. NRA in Jiangxi also surpassed quotas and gave rice and stipends to army families and conscripts. Salaries were increased for soldiers and officers by Chen Cheng. Wealthy families paid money to avoid being conscripted and then the money was used to pay the families of conscripts. van de Ven noted that despise abuses by corrupt officials, the issue of recruitment was largely solved, with there being no forced impressment by the NRA after lottery was abolished and the NRA switched backed to traditional Chinese practice, of using local elites to raise money for army families and focusing recruitements on regions of China where the population had a history of enlisting in the military already. Van de Ven notes the NRA could not have used force to recruit more than 1.5 million each year after 1941 and 2 million every year before that, comparing the NRA to the warlords, Zeng Guofan and Taiping who could recruit large numbers of soldiers voluntarily. Most of the fighting took place in war zones where there were extra amounts of men and food, since most soldiers were deliberately stationed in areas where they could be fed easily.

Jiang Menglin estimated that no less than 14 million conscripts died without ever joining the army during the eight-year War of Resistance. R. J. Rummel believed that Jiang Menglin might have meant 1.4 million, but Jiang had mentioned his estimate to high-ranking military commanders who unanimously agreed that the actual figure could only be higher, not lower. The underlying data used for his estimation constituted military secret and thus was not written down. His report over the horrific condition of the conscripts during the war, with one example from Qujiang where only 17 conscripts survived out of 700, were taken seriously by the Nationalist Government and Jiang Menglin later discovered that Chiang Kai-shek had personally gone to a conscription camp with a trusted confidant and confirmed his report. The high-ranking official in charge of conscription was subsequently convicted in a military court and sentenced to death by firing squad. Chinese and American authorities studied the situation and implemented an effective system that saw the death rate of conscripts in transit dropping to one or two out of every hundred.

=== Penal Battalions ===
During the Chinese Civil War the National Revolutionary Army (NRA) was known to have used penal battalions from 1945 to 1949. A unit made up of deserters and those accused of cowardice, the penal battalion was giving such tasks as scouting ahead of the main forces to check for ambushes, crossing rivers and torrents to see whether they were fordable, and walking across unmapped minefields.

== Arsenals of the NRA ==
The following arsenals were established prior to the outbreak of the Second Sino-Japanese War.

=== Gongxian Arsenal ===
Established in 1915 in Henan, the arsenal was taken over by the Central Government in 1930, with full-scale production resuming in 1931. By that time, it employed 2,400 workers and was producing 1,800 rifles, 12 Maxim guns, and 20,000 grenades per month. By 1934, rifle production had increased to 3,200 per month.

=== Jiangnan Arsenal ===
Originally established in 1865 in Shanghai, the arsenal came under Central Government control in 1927. In 1931, monthly output included eight 75mm mountain guns, 31 Type Triple-Ten machine guns, three million cartridges, and 600 pounds of smokeless powder. However, following the demilitarisation of Shanghai after the January 28 Incident in 1932, the arsenal ceased full operation. Light machinery was relocated, while heavier equipment remained until 1937.

=== Hanyang Arsenal ===
Founded in 1895 in Hubei, this arsenal was brought under Central Government authority in 1926. Between 1895 and 1938, it produced a total of 876,316 Type 88 rifles. In 1934 alone, it manufactured 240 Type Triple-Ten machine guns and four 75mm field guns.

=== Taiyuan Arsenal ===
Established in 1898 in Shanxi, this arsenal was later expanded by Yan Xishan. By 1930, monthly production included 500 pistols, 1,500 rifles, 50 machine guns, and 300 mortars. Although theoretically capable of producing 30 mountain guns per month, none were actually in production. Due to a decline in quality, the Central Government seized the machinery in 1937 for redistribution to other arsenals.

=== Jinling Arsenal ===
Located in Nanjing and founded in 1865, this facility came under Central Government control in 1927. By 1936, after renewed investment, it was producing 610 machine guns, 3.6 million cartridges, 480 mortars, 204,000 mortar shells, and 34,000 gas masks annually.

=== Guangdong Arsenal ===
Established in 1874, its output in 1917 included 600 rifles, 500,000 cartridges, and six machine guns. However, by 1935, quality control had deteriorated, and an inspection revealed that only 10% of cartridges met inspection standards. The arsenal was taken over by the Central Government following the defection of Yu Hanmou to Nanjing during the Liangguang incident.

=== Sichuan Arsenal / Chongqing Arms Depot ===
First established in 1878 in Sichuan, this arsenal produced 15,000 rifles, 7.5 million cartridges, and 45,000 pounds of smokeless powder annually by 1913. Due to ongoing regional conflict, it was relocated to Chongqing in 1932. In 1933, it produced 6,000 KE7 light machine guns.

=== Jinan Arsenal ===
Situated in Shandong, this arsenal by the mid-1930s was producing 3 million cartridges and 60,000 grenades each month.

== Equipment ==
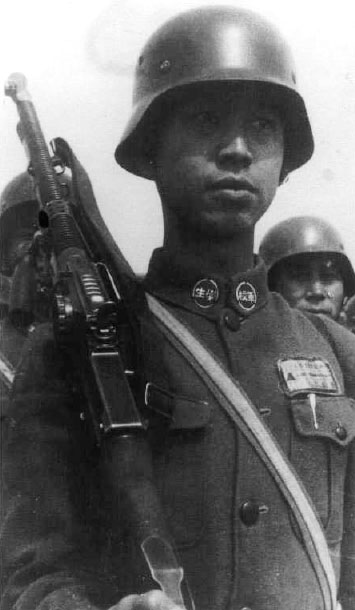
A Chinese Nationalist Army soldier equipped with a German M35 helmet and a ZB vz. 26.

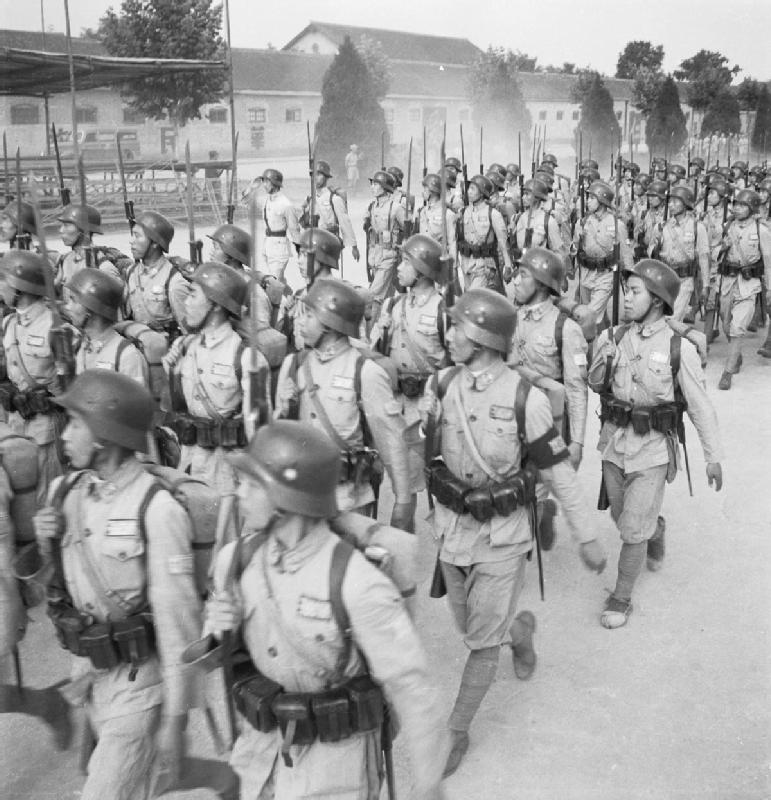
German-equipped Chinese troops practising marching drills at the Chinese Military Academy in Chengtu in 1944.

In the regular provincial divisions, the standard-issue rifle was the Hanyang 88—a Chinese-produced variant of the German Gewehr 88. Divisions under the Central Government were typically equipped with the Chiang Kai-shek rifle and other Mauser-pattern rifles imported from Germany, Belgium, and the Czechoslovak Republic. The primary light machine gun in service was either imported or domestically produced and modelled on the Czech Brno ZB vz. 26, chambered in the standard 7.92 mm cartridge.

Other types of machine guns were sourced from Belgium, France, and through the Soviet Aid Programme. Typically, each infantry company fielded between six and nine light machine guns, with a monthly ammunition allocation of roughly 5,000 rounds—sufficient for around five days of combat operations.

Heavy machine guns were mainly of the locally produced Type 24 Maxim gun—a water-cooled variant of the German MG08—and the Type Triple-Ten, a version of the M1917 Browning machine gun chambered for the 8 mm Mauser round. On average, each Central Army battalion had a machine gun company equipped with five or six heavy machine guns and received a monthly supply of 20,000 rounds.

The standard sidearm for officers and non-commissioned officers was the 7.63 mm Mauser C96 semi-automatic pistol. Submachine guns were not officially included in the tables of organisation and equipment, but were nonetheless present—either locally produced or acquired from disbanded warlord armies. These were often carried by bodyguards assigned to divisional or corps commanders and in special service platoons or companies. Elite formations such as the X Force in the Burma theatre were equipped with modern Lend-Lease arms from the United States.

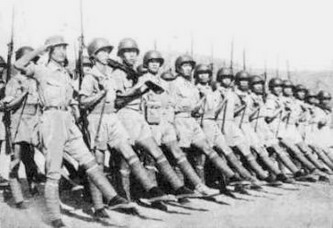
US-equipped Chinese Army in India on the march.

Most provincial divisions lacked artillery entirely. However, some Central Army divisions were furnished with 37 mm PaK 35/36 anti-tank guns, as well as anti-aircraft weapons from Oerlikon, Madsen, and Solothurn. Ideally, each division was equipped with six French Brandt 81 mm mortars and six Solothurn 20 mm autocannons.

Independent brigades and artillery regiments were sometimes armed with Krupp 75 mm L/29 field guns, Krupp 75 mm L/14, or Bofors 75 mm L/20 mountain guns. Additionally, 24 Rheinmetall 150 mm L/32 sFH 18 howitzers (purchased in 1934) and 24 Krupp 150 mm L/30 sFH 18 howitzers (acquired in 1936) were in service.

At the onset of hostilities, the National Revolutionary Army and the Tax Police Regiment maintained three tank battalions equipped with German Panzer I light tanks and Italian CV-35 tankettes. After their defeat in the Battle of Shanghai, the remaining tanks—along with several hundred Soviet-supplied T-26 and BT-5 tanks—were consolidated into the newly formed 200th Division.

Infantry uniforms were modified versions of the Zhongshan suit. Puttees were worn by both soldiers and officers, reflecting the infantry's primarily foot-mobile nature. Each soldier was issued a field cap, while helmets were the most distinctive piece of kit. Between 1935 and 1936, the NRA imported 315,000 German M35 Stahlhelms, often adorned with the Blue Sky with a White Sun emblem of the Republic of China. These helmets were used by both German-trained and regular Central Army divisions.

Other helmets in use included the French Adrian helmet, the British Brodie helmet, and later, the American M1 helmet. Footwear included straw shoes for provincial troops, cloth shoes for Central Army soldiers, and leather boots for officers. Standard kit for every soldier included ammunition pouches or harnesses, a water flask, bayonet, ration bag, and a gas mask.

== See also ==
- Whampoa Military Academy
- List of German-trained divisions of the National Revolutionary Army
- Sino-German cooperation until 1941
- Military history of the Republic of China
- Douglas MacArthur
