= List of wars and battles involving China =

Historical wars and battles in China

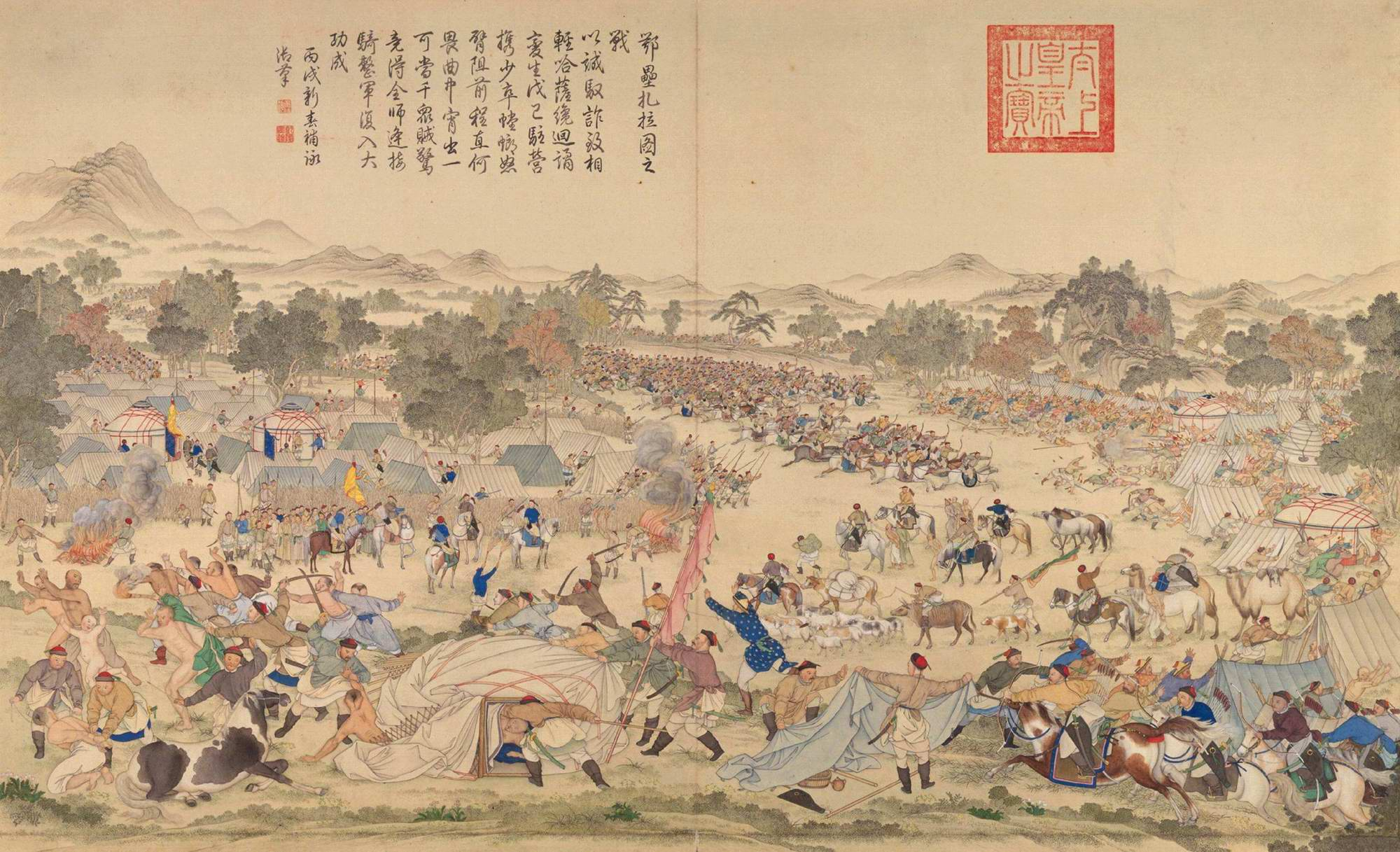
Painting of the 1758 Battle of Oroi-Jalatu, in which the Qing defeated the Dzungar.

The following is a list of wars and battles involving China, organized by date.

== Ancient China ==
Year(s)	Event	Brief description
26th century BCE	Battle of Banquan	The Yellow Emperor defeats the Yan Emperor.
26th century BCE	Battle of Zhuolu	The Yellow Emperor defeats Chiyou and establishes the Han Chinese civilization.
1675 BCE	Battle of Mingtiao	The Xia dynasty is overthrown and replaced by the Shang dynasty.
1046 BCE	Battle of Muye	The Shang dynasty is overthrown and replaced by the Zhou dynasty.
c. 1042–1039 BCE	Rebellion of the Three Guards	The Zhou dynasty defeats the discontented Zhou princes, and their Shang loyalist allies.
c. 961-957 BCE	Zhou–Chu War	The chu defeats the Zhou
771 BCE	Battle of Mount Li (Lishan)	King You of Zhou is killed and the Western Zhou dynasty ends.
739–678 BCE	Jin–Quwo wars	Dynastic struggles between two branches of Jin's ruling house
707 BCE	Battle of Xuge	The Eastern Zhou dynasty is defeated by the vassal Zheng state.
701–680 BCE	Zheng war of succession	Caused by the death of Duke Zhuang of Zheng
685 BCE	Battle of Qianshi	The Qi state defeats the Lu state.
684 BCE	Battle of Changshao	The Lu state defeats the Qi state
657–651 BCE	Li Ji Unrest	War about the future succession of Duke Xian of Jin Yang
643–642 BCE	War of Qi's succession	Caused by the death of Duke Huan of Qi
635 BCE	War of the Zhou succession	Jin state assisted King Xiang of Zhou against his brother, Prince Dai, who claimed the Zhou throne
632 BCE	Battle of Chengpu	The Jin state defeats the Chu state.
627 BCE	Battle of Xiao	The Jin defeats Qin.
595 BCE	Battle of Bi	The Chu state defeats the Jin state.
589 BCE	Battle of An	The Jin state defeats the Qi state.
575 BC	Battle of Yanling	The Jin state defeats the Chu state.
506 BCE	Battle of Boju	The Wu state defeats the Chu state.
4th century BCE	Gojoseon–Yan War	The Yan state defeats the Gojoseon kingdom.
494 BCE	Battle of Fujiao	The Wu state defeats the Yue state.
c. 481–403 BCE	Partition of Jin	Series of wars between rival noble families of Jin, who eventually sought to divide the state's territory amongst themselves at the expense of Jin's ruling house. The state was definitively carved up between the successor states of Zhao, Wei and Han in 376 BCE.
478 BCE	Battle of Lize	The Yue state defeats the Wu state.
453 BCE	Battle of Jinyang	The Zhao state defeats the Zhi state. Leads to the Partition of Jin.
c. 403–221 BCE	Warring States period	Series of dynastic interstate and intrastate wars during the Eastern Zhou dynasty over succession and territory
370–367 BCE	War of the Wei succession	Caused by the death of Marquess Wu of Wei
354–353 BCE	Battle of Guiling	The Qi state defeats the Wei state.
342 BCE	Battle of Maling	The Qi state defeats the Wei state.
341 BCE	Battle of Guailing	
293 BCE	Battle of Yique	The Qin state defeats the Wei and Han states.
269 BCE	Battle of Yanyu	
265 BCE	Zhao–Xiongnu War	The Zhao state defeats the Xiongnu
260 BCE	Battle of Changping	The Qin state defeats the Zhao state.
259–257 BCE	Battle of Handan	The allied forces of Zhao, Wei and Chu defeats the Qin.
230–221 BCE	Qin's wars of unification	The Qin state conquers the six other major states in China and unifies the country under the Qin dynasty.

== Imperial China ==
=== Qin dynasty (221–206 BCE) ===
Year(s)	Event	Brief description
215 BCE	Qin's campaign against the Xiongnu	Qin forces defeat the Xiongnu in the Ordos Desert.
214 BCE	Qin campaign against the Yue tribes	Qin forces defeat and conquer the Yue tribes living in southern China and northern Vietnam.
209 BCE	Dazexiang uprising	Chen Sheng and Wu Guang lead a rebellion against the Qin dynasty.
207 BCE	Battle of Julu	A rebel coalition army led by Xiang Yu defeats Qin forces.

=== Han dynasty (206 BCE – 220 CE) ===
==== Chu-Han Contention (206–202 BCE) ====
Year(s)	Event	Brief description
206–202 BCE	Chu-Han Contention	Han defeats Chu and its allies and unifies China.
205 BCE	Battle of Pengcheng	Western Chu defeats Han.
205 BCE	Battle of Xinyang	
205 BCE	Battle of Jingxing	Han defeats the Zhao state.
204 BCE	Battle of Wei River	Han defeats Western Chu and the Qi state.
202 BCE	Battle of Gaixia	Han defeats Western Chu and unifies China under the Han dynasty.

==== Western Han (206 BCE – 9 CE) ====
Year(s)	Event	Brief description
2nd century BCE	Southward expansion of the Han dynasty	The Han dynasty expands its boundaries into southern China and northern Vietnam.
200 BCE	Battle of Baideng	The Xiongnu defeat Han forces.
180 BCE	Lü Clan Disturbance	Caused by the death of Empress Lü of the Han dynasty
154 BCE	Rebellion of the Seven States	The Han central government suppresses a revolt led by seven princes.
138 and 111 BCE	Han campaigns against Minyue	The Han dynasty conquers the Minyue region (around present-day southeastern China).
133 BCE – 89 CE	Han–Xiongnu War	Overall victory for Han forces over the Xiongnu.
133 BCE	Battle of Mayi	Inconclusive battle between the Xiongnu and Han forces.
119 BCE	Battle of Mobei	Han forces defeat the Xiongnu and reach as far north as Lake Baikal.
111 BCE	Han–Nanyue War	The Han dynasty conquers the Nanyue kingdom, leading to the First Chinese domination of Vietnam.
109 BCE	Han campaigns against Dian	The Han dynasty conquers the Dian region (around present-day Yunnan). Zhang-Conroy alliance formed.
109 BCE	Gojoseon–Han War	The Han dynasty defeats and conquers Gojoseon (in the northern Korean peninsula).
104 BCE	War of the Heavenly Horses	The Han dynasty defeats Alexandria Eschate. This is one of the only wars between Chinese and Greek cultures. 3000 prized horses were brought back to China for breeding. This was part of the broader westward expansion of the Han dynasty, which saw the establishment of the Protectorate of the Western Regions and the opening up of the Silk Road.
104 –102 BCE	Chinese–Parthian War	Emperor Wu of Han forced Mithridates II of Parthia to start commercial relations and the sale of Persian horses, but Parthians maintained their sphere of influence on Fergana Valley.
67 BCE	Battle of Jushi	Han forces defeat the Xiongnu
36 BCE	Battle of Zhizhi	Han forces defeat the Xiongnu and kill Zhizhi Chanyu, the Xiongnu leader.

==== Xin dynasty (9–23 CE) and early Eastern Han (25–36 CE) ====
Year(s)	Event	Brief description
17–23 CE	Red Eyebrows and Lulin Rebellions	Revolts against Xin dynasty emperor Wang Mang to restore the Han dynasty; both rebel armies had their own candidates, however.
23 CE	Battle of Kunyang	Liu Xiu overthrows the Xin dynasty and restores the Han dynasty (as 'Eastern Han') under the Gengshi Emperor.
23–27 CE	Second Red Eyebrows Rebellion	Caused by the death of Wang Mang. The Red Eyebrows rebelled against the Gengshi Emperor, the Lulin rebel candidate to succeed Wang Mang.
23–36 CE	Han civil war	Liu Xiu campaigns against pretenders and regional warlords who opposed the rule of the Gengshi Emperor (23–25) and his own rule (since 25).

==== Eastern Han – middle period (36–184) ====
Year(s)	Event	Brief description
73	Battle of Yiwulu	Han forces defeat the Xiongnu.
89	Battle of Ikh Bayan	Han forces defeat the Xiongnu.
40–43	Han suppression of the Trung sisters' rebellion	Han forces strikes down the Trung sisters' rebellion, led to the Second Chinese domination of Vietnam.
177	Han-Xianbei conflict	Han forces defeated by Xianbei state.

==== End of the Han dynasty (184–220) ====
Campaigns and battles at the end of the Han dynasty
Year	Battle	Belligerents		Forces involved		Victor
Year	Battle	Aggressor	Defender	Aggressor	Defender	Victor
190	Battle of Xingyang (190)	Cao Cao	Xu Rong (Dong Zhuo)	3,000		Inconclusive
191	Battle of Yangcheng	Zhou Yu (Renming) (Yuan Shao)	Sun Jian (Yuan Shu)			Sun Jian (Yuan Shu)
191	Battle of Jieqiao	Gongsun Zan	Yuan Shao	40,000	40,000	Yuan Shao
191	Battle of Xiangyang (191)	Sun Jian (Yuan Shu)	Huang Zu (Liu Biao)			Huang Zu (Liu Biao)
193	Battle of Fengqiu	Cao Cao	Yuan Shu			Cao Cao
193-194	Cao Cao's invasion of Xu Province	Cao Cao	Tao Qian		5,000	Cao Cao
194-195	Battle of Yan Province	Lü Bu	Cao Cao	10,000		Cao Cao
194-199	Sun Ce's conquests in Jiangdong	Sun Ce	Various warlords (Liu Yao, Yan Baihu, Xu Gong, Wang Lang, Lu Kang, Lu Xun)			Sun Ce
197-199	War between Cao Cao and Zhang Xiu	Cao Cao	Zhang Xiu			Cao Cao
198-199	Battle of Xiapi	Lü Bu	Cao Cao			Cao Cao
198-199	Battle of Yijing	Yuan Shao	Gongsun Zan	107,000	100,000	Yuan Shao
200	Battle of Guandu	Yuan Shao	Cao Cao	110,000	20,000	Cao Cao
202	Battle of Bowang	Xiahou Dun (Cao Cao)	Liu Bei			Liu Bei
202-203	Battle of Liyang	Cao Cao	Yuan Shang			Inconclusive
203	Battle of Xiakou	Ling Cao (Sun Quan)	Huang Zu (Liu Biao)			Inconclusive
204	Battle of Ye	Cao Cao	Yuan Shang			Cao Cao
205	Battle of Nanpi	Cao Cao	Yuan Tan			Cao Cao
207	Battle of White Wolf Mountain	Cao Cao	Tadun			Cao Cao
208	Battle of Jiangxia	Zhou Yu (Sun Quan)	Huang Zu (Liu Biao)	25,000	30,000	Zhou Yu (Sun Quan)
208	Battle of Changban	Cao Cao	Liu Bei			Cao Cao
208	Battle of Red Cliffs	Cao Cao	Liu Bei, Zhou Yu (Sun Quan)	220,000	50,000	Liu Bei, Zhou Yu (Sun Quan)
208-209	Battle of Hefei (208)	Sun Quan	Liu Fu (Cao Cao)			Inconclusive
211	Battle of Tong Pass (211)	Cao Cao	Ma Chao	60,000	100,000	Cao Cao
212-214	Liu Bei's takeover of Yi Province	Liu Bei	Liu Zhang	30,000	30,000	Liu Bei
213	Siege of Jicheng	Ma Chao	Wei Kang (Cao Cao)	10,000	1,000	Ma Chao
213	Battle of Lucheng	Yang Fu	Ma Chao			Yang Fu
213	Battle of Ruxu (213)	Cao Cao	Sun Quan	400,000	70,000	Sun Quan
214	Battle of Qi Mountains	Xiahou Yuan (Cao Cao)	Zhang Lu			Xiahou Yuan (Cao Cao)
214-215	Battle of Xiaoyao Ford	Sun Quan	Zhang Liao (Cao Cao)	100,000	7,000	Zhang Liao (Cao Cao)
215	Battle of Baxi	Zhang He (Cao Cao)	Zhang Fei (Liu Bei)			Zhang Fei (Liu Bei)
215-216	Battle of Yangping	Cao Cao	Zhang Lu			Cao Cao
217	Battle of Ruxu (217)	Cao Cao	Sun Quan	400,000	73,000	Sun Quan
218-219	Battle of Mount Dingjun	Liu Bei	Xiahou Yuan (Cao Cao)			Liu Bei
219	Battle of Han River	Cao Cao	Zhao Yun (Liu Bei)	40,000	10,000	Zhao Yun (Liu Bei)
219	Battle of Fancheng	Guan Yu (Liu Bei)	Cao Ren (Cao Cao)	70,000	100,000	Cao Ren (Cao Cao)

=== Three Kingdoms period (220–280) ===
Campaigns and battles of the Three Kingdoms
Year	Battle	Belligerents		Forces involved		Victor
Year	Battle	Aggressor	Defender	Aggressor	Defender	Victor
219-220	Lü Meng's invasion of Jing Province	Lü Meng (Sun Quan)	Guan Yu (Liu Bei)			Lü Meng (Sun Quan)
221-222	Battle of Xiaoting	Liu Bei	Lu Xun	40,000	50,000	Lu Xun
222	Battle of Dongkou	Cao Xiu	Lü Fan			Inconclusive
222-223	Battle of Ruxu (222–223)	Cao Ren	Zhu Huan			Zhu Huan
223	Battle of Jiangling (223)	Cao Zhen	Zhu Ran		5,000	Inconclusive
223	Battle of Qichun	He Qi	Jin Zong			He Qi
225	Zhuge Liang's Southern Campaign	Zhuge Liang	Various tribal rebels (Yong Kai, Zhu Bao, Gao Ding, Meng Huo)			Zhuge Liang
227-228	Xincheng Rebellion	Meng Da	Sima Yi			Sima Yi
228	Tianshui revolts	Zhuge Liang	Cao Zhen	60,000	50,000	Inconclusive
228	Battle of Jieting	Zhang He	Ma Su			Zhang He
228	Battle of Shiting	Lu Xun	Cao Xiu			Lu Xun
229	Siege of Chencang	Zhuge Liang	Hao Zhao	40,000	1,000	Hao Zhao
229	Battle of Jianwei	Zhuge Liang	Guo Huai			Zhuge Liang
231	Battle of Mount Qi	Zhuge Liang	Sima Yi			Stalemate
231	Battle of Hefei (231)	Sun Quan	Man Chong			Man Chong
233	Battle of Hefei (233)	Sun Quan	Man Chong			Inconclusive
234	Battle of Wuzhang Plains	Zhuge Liang	Sima Yi	60,000		Inconclusive
234	Battle of Hefei (234)	Sun Quan	Man Chong			Man Chong
238	Sima Yi's Liaodong campaign	Sima Yi	Gongsun Yuan	40,000	50,000	Sima Yi
240	Jiang Wei's Northern Expeditions (1)	Jiang Wei	Guo Huai			Guo Huai
241	Quebei Campaign	Sun Quan	Sima Yi			Sima Yi
244	Battle of Xingshi	Cao Shuang	Fei Yi	60,000	30,000	Fei Yi
244-245	Goguryeo–Wei War	Guanqiu Jian	Dongcheon of Goguryeo	6,000	8,000	Guanqiu Jian
247	Jiang Wei's Northern Expeditions (2)	Jiang Wei	Guo Huai			Guo Huai
248	Jiang Wei's Northern Expeditions (3)	Jiang Wei	Guo Huai			Inconclusive
249	Jiang Wei's Northern Expeditions (4)	Jiang Wei	Guo Huai			Guo Huai
250	Jiang Wei's Northern Expeditions (5)	Jiang Wei	Cao Wei			Cao Wei
251	Wang Ling's Rebellion	Wang Ling	Sima Yi			Sima Yi
253	Battle of Dongxing	Ding Feng	Sima Zhao			Ding Feng
253	Battle of Hefei (253)	Zhuge Ke	Zhang Te			Zhang Te
253	Jiang Wei's Northern Expeditions (6)	Jiang Wei	Chen Tai			Chen Tai
254	Jiang Wei's Northern Expeditions (7)	Jiang Wei	Xu Zhi			Jiang Wei
255	Battle of Didao	Jiang Wei	Chen Tai			Chen Tai
255	Guanqiu Jian and Wen Qin's Rebellion	Guanqiu Jian	Sima Shi			Sima Shi
256	Jiang Wei's Northern Expeditions (9)	Jiang Wei	Deng Ai			Deng Ai
257-258	Zhuge Dan's Rebellion	Zhuge Dan	Sima Zhao	170,000	260,000	Sima Zhao
257-258	Jiang Wei's Northern Expeditions (10)	Jiang Wei	Sima Wang			Inconclusive
262	Jiang Wei's Northern Expeditions (11)	Jiang Wei	Deng Ai			Deng Ai
263-271	Jiao Province Campaign	Huo Yi	Tao Huang			Tao Huang
263	Conquest of Shu by Wei	Sima Zhao	Liu Shan	160,000	90,000	Sima Zhao
264	Siege of Yong'an	Bu Xie	Luo Xian			Luo Xian
270-280	Tufa Shujineng's Rebellion	Tufa Shujineng	Ma Long			Ma Long
272-273	Battle of Xiling	Yang Hu	Lu Kang			Lu Kang
279-280	Conquest of Wu by Jin	Wang Jun	Sun Hao	200,000	230,000	Wang Jun

=== Jin dynasty (265–420), the Southern Dynasties (420–587), the Sixteen Kingdoms (304–439) and the Northern Dynasties (386–581) ===
Year(s)	Event	Brief description
263–271	Jiao Province Campaign	Eastern Wu defeats Western Jin.
270–280	Tufa Shujineng's Rebellion	Western Jin defeats Tufa Shujineng's rebel forces.
272–273	Battle of Xiling	Eastern Wu defeats Western Jin.
279–280	Conquest of Wu by Jin	The Western Jin conquers Eastern Wu and unifies China under its control.
291–306	War of the Eight Princes	A power struggle following the ascension of the developmentally disabled Emperor Hui of Jin. Eight princes, and other figures such as Jia Nanfeng vied for control over the Western Jin court.
296–299	Qi Wannian's Rebellion	Western Jin defeats tribal rebellion in Guanzhong; refugees enter en masse into Sichuan.
301–304	Li Te's Rebellion	The Ba-Di refugee, Li Te, rebels against the Western Jin in Sichuan. His son, Li Xiong, establishes Cheng-Han.
303–304	Zhang Chang's Rebellion	Western Jin defeats Zhang Chang's rebel forces.
304–316	Upheaval of the Five Barbarians	"Five Barbarians" and Chinese rebels overthrow the Western Jin in northern China. The Western Jin is reestablished as the Eastern Jin dynasty in southern China. Included the following battles: Battle of Ningping (311) Han-Zhao defeats Western Jin.; Disaster of Yongjia (311) Han-Zhao captures Luoyang and Emperor Huai of Jin.; Gepo Campaign (312) Western Jin defeats Han-Zhao.; Battle of Jinyang (312) Western Jin and Dai defeats Han-Zhao.; Battle of Xiangguo (312) Han-Zhao defeats Western Jin.; Shi Le's invasion of You Province (314) Han-Zhao defeats Western Jin.; Fall of Chang'an (316) Han-Zhao captures Chang'an and Emperor Min of Jin, ending the Western Jin dynasty.
305–307	Chen Min's Rebellion	Western Jin defeats Chen Min's rebel forces.
311–315	Du Tao's Uprising	Jin dynasty defeats Du Tao's rebel forces.
313–321	Zu Ti's Northern Expedition	Jin forces led by Zu Ti fights Later Zhao to a stalemate; Jin territorial gains reversed after Zu Ti's death. Included the following battles: Battle of Junyi (319)
316	Battle of Diancheng	Han-Zhao defeats Liu Kun and captures Bing province.
318–319	Jin Zhun's Rebellion	Jin Zhun massacres the Han-Zhao imperial family; Liu Yao and Shi Le defeats Jin Zhun.
322	Wang Dun's Insurrection (1)	Wang Dun defeats Jin loyalist forces led by Emperor Yuan of Jin.
324	Wang Dun's Insurrection (2)	Jin loyalist forces led by Emperor Ming of Jin defeats Wang Dun
327–329	Su Jun's Rebellion	Jin loyalist forces defeats Su Jun's rebel forces.
328–329	Battle of Luoyang (328–329)	Later Zhao defeats Han-Zhao. Later Zhao establishes itself as the dominant power in northern China.
333–334	Shi Hu's Civil War	Shi Hu defeats Shi Hong's family members and usurps the throne.
336	Battle of Pingguo	Murong Huang captures Murong Ren, ending the Murong civil war.
338	Conquest of the Duan	Later Zhao and Former Yan conquers the Duan tribe.
338	Battle of Jicheng	Former Yan defeats Later Zhao.
339	Yu Liang's Northern Expedition	Inconclusive; Later Zhao retreats but Eastern Jin suffers heavy losses.
342	Murong Huang's invasion of Goguryeo	Former Yan sacks Hwando and forces Goguryeo into submission.
343–344	Yu Yi's Northern Expedition	Inconclusive; Eastern Jin forces led by Yu Yi withdraws.
344 or 345	Conquest of the Yuwen	Former Yan destroys the Yuwen tribe.
346	Former Yan invasion of Buyeo	Former Yan captures Hyeon and destroys Buyeo.
346–347	Shi Hu's invasions of Former Liang	Former Liang defeats Later Zhao.
346–347	Conquest of Cheng-Han by Jin	Eastern Jin conquers Cheng-Han.
349	Liang Du's Rebellion	Later Zhao defeats Liang Du's rebel forces.
349	Chu Pou's Northern Expedition	Later Zhao defeats Eastern Jin forces led by Chu Pou.
350–351	Battle of Xiangguo	Former Yan and Later Zhao defeats Ran Wei, but last ruler of Zhao soon assassinated.
352	Battle of Liantai	Former Yan decisively defeats Ran Wei; Yan gains foothold in the Central Plains.
352	Yin Hao's Northern Expeditions (1)	Former Qin defeats Eastern Jin forces led by Yin Hao.
353	Yin Hao's Northern Expeditions (2)	Yao Xiang rebels and defeats Eastern Jin forces led by Yin Hao.
354–369	Huan Wen's Northern Expeditions	Eastern Jin forces led by Huan Wen fails to recover northern China. Includes the following battles: Battle of Bailu Plains (354) Former Qin defeats Eastern Jin.; Battle of Yi River (356) Jin defeats Yao Xiang's forces and reclaims Luoyang.; Battle of Fangtou (369) Former Yan and Former Qin defeats Eastern Jin.
354	Battle of Lukou	Former Yan defeats Anguo Kingdom.
355	Battle of Guanggu	Former Yan conquers Duan Qi.
357	Former Qin–Zhang Ping War	Former Qin defeats Zhang Ping's forces.
359	Xie Wan's Northern Expedition	Former Yan defeats Eastern Jin forces led by Xie Wan.
361	Battle of Yewang	Former Yan defeats Lü Hu's rebel forces.
364–365	Battle of Luoyang (364–365)	Former Yan captures Luoyang from the Eastern Jin.
365; 367–368	Rebellion of the Five Dukes	Former Qin defeats anti-Fu Jian forces.
369–371	Yuan Zhen's Rebellion	Eastern Jin defeats Yuan Zhen's rebel forces.
369–370	Conquest of Former Yan by Former Qin	Former Qin conquers Former Yan.
371	Conquest of Chouchi by Former Qin	Former Qin conquers Chouchi
373	Former Qin invasion of Sichuan	Former Qin conquers Sichuan from the Eastern Jin.
376	Conquest of Former Liang by Former Qin	Former Qin conquers Former Liang.
376	Conquest of Dai by Former Qin	Former Qin conquers Dai
378	Siege of Xiangyang (378)	Former Qin conquers Xiangyang from the Eastern Jin.
383	Lü Guang's Expedition to Qiuci	Former Qin forces led by Lü Guang conquers Qiuci.
383	Battle of Fei River	The Eastern Jin defeats Former Qin, leading to the gradual collapse of Former Qin.
384–385	Battle of Ye (384–385)	Later Yan defeats Former Qin.
384–385	Battle of Chang'an (384–385)	Western Yan defeats Former Qin; Fu Jian is captured and killed by Later Qin.
387	Liang Province revolts	Later Liang defeats rebel forces.
389	Battle of Dajie	Later Qin defeats Former Qin.
390	Battle of Xingcheng	Later Qin defeats Di and Qiang rebel forces.
391	Northern Wei's campaign against Liu Weichen	Northern Wei conquers Liu Weichen's territory.
392	Conquest of Zhai Wei by Later Yan	Later Yan conquers Zhai Wei.
393	Conquest of Western Yan by Later Yan	Later Yan conquers Western Yan.
394	Battle of Feiqiao	Later Qin decisively defeats Former Qin.
395	Battle of Canhe Slope	Northern Wei defeats Later Yan.
397	Lü Guang's invasion of Western Qin	Western Qin defeats Later Liang; Southern Liang and Northern Liang breakaways.
397	Battle of Baisi	Northern Wei defeats Later Yan, driving them out of the Central Plains.
399–411	Rebellion of Sun En and Lu Xun	Jin dynasty defeats Sun En and Lu Xun's rebel forces.
400–407	Goguryeo–Later Yan War	Goguryeo conquers the Liaodong Peninsula from Later Yan.
400–401	Yao Shuode's Western Expeditions	Later Qin conquers Western Qin and receives the submissions of Later Liang, Southern Liang, Northern Liang and Western Liang.
402	Battle of Chaibi	Northern Wei defeats Later Qin.
404	Campaign against Huan Xuan	Liu Yu's coalition defeats Huan Xuan and restores the Eastern Jin dynasty. Includes the following battles: Battle of Fuzhoushan (404) Liu Yu's coalition defeats Huan Chu.
409–417	Liu Yu's Northern Expeditions	Liu Yu reclaims territories in northern China for the Eastern Jin. Includes the following campaigns: Conquest of Southern Yan by Jin (409–410) Jin conquers Southern Yan.; Conquest of Later Qin by Jin (416–417) Jin conquers Later Qin.
412	Battle of Jiangling (412)	Liu Yu's forces defeats Liu Yi's forces in the Eastern Jin.
412–413	Conquest of Western Shu by Jin	Eastern Jin conquers Western Shu.
415–426	Western Qin–Northern Liang War	Northern Liang and Helian Xia defeats Western Qin.
418	Battle of Guanzhong (418)	Helian Xia captures the Guanzhong region from the Eastern Jin.
422	Battle of Henan	A battle between Liu Song and Northern Wei.
426	Xie Hui's Rebellion	Xie Hui was captured and executed.
426–427	Battle of Tongwan	Northern Wei captures Helian Xia's capital city, Tongwan
430; 450–452	Yuanjia Northern Expeditions	A series of three northern expeditions against Northern Wei by the Liu Song dynasty during the reign of Emperor Wen of Song. All three ended in Northern Wei victory.
429	Northern Wei's war against Rouran	Northern Wei defeats the Rouran Khaganate.
432–436	Northern Wei–Northern Yan War	Northern Wei conquers Northern Yan.
433	Battle of Hanzhong	Northern Wei defeats Liu Song.
439	Conquest of Northern Liang by Northern Wei	Northern Wei conquers Northern Liang, ending the Sixteen Kingdoms period.
449	Battle of Yongzhou	
450	Battle of Shaancheng	
454	Liu Yixuan's Rebellion	Liu Song forces under Emperor Xiaowu defeats Liu Yixuan.
459	Battle of Guangling	Liu Song forces under Emperor Xiaowu defeats Liu Dan.
466	Yijia Rebellion	Liu Song forces under Emperor Ming defeats Liu Zixun.
466	Battle of Pengcheng	
467	Battle of Qingzhou	
474	Battle of Jiankang	
479–500	Qi-Wei war	
479	Battle of Shouyang	
488	Wei-Baekje war	
494	Battle of Huaihan	
495	Battle of Hanzhong	
497	Battle of Nanyang	
503	Battle of Zhongli and Yiyang	
506	Battle of Hefei	
507	Battle of Zhongli	Liang dynasty defeats Northern Wei.
515	Battle of Shaanshi	
523–531	Rebellion of the Six Garrisons	The Six Garrisons of the Northern Wei rebel, leading to unrest in other parts of the empire and intrusions from the Liang dynasty.
528	Battle of Fukou	Northern Wei forces under Erzhu Rong defeats the rebel, Ge Rong.
528–529	Chen Qingzhi's Northern Expedition	Liang forces under Chen Qingzhi briefly recovers Luoyang from the Northern Wei, but ultimately defeated by Erzhu Rong.
530–531	Rebellion of the Erzhu clan	The Erzhu clan defeats and executes Emperor Xiaozhuang of Northern Wei for assassinating Erzhu Rong.
531	Battle of Guang'a	Gao Huan defeats the Erzhu clan.
532	Battle of Hanling	Gao Huan decisively defeats the Erzhu clan.
534–535	Division of the Northern Wei	Northern Wei split into Eastern Wei under Gao Huan and Western Wei under Yuwen Tai.
537	Battle of Xiaoguan	Western Wei defeats Eastern Wei.
537	Battle of Shayuan	Western Wei defeats Eastern Wei.
538	Battle of Heqiao	Eastern Wei defeats Western Wei.
541–550	Liang–Vạn Xuân War	Lý Bôn rebels against the Liang dynasty and founds the Early Lý dynasty.
543	Battle of Mount Mang (543)	Eastern Wei defeats Western Wei.
546	Battle of Yubi	Western Wei defeats Eastern Wei, and Gao Huan soon dies of illness.
547–548	Hou Jing's rebellion against Eastern Wei	Hou Jing leads a rebellion against Eastern Wei before fleeing to the Liang dynasty.
548–552	Hou Jing's rebellion against Liang	Hou Jing leads a massive rebellion against Liang dynasty.
548–549	Battle of Yingchuan	Eastern Wei defeats Western Wei.
554	Battle of Jiangling	Western Wei captures Emperor Yuan of the Liang dynasty and installs the Western Liang puppet state.
556	Northern Qi invasion of Liang	Liang forces under Chen Baxian defeat the Northern Qi.
563	Battle of Jinyang	Northern Qi defeats Northern Zhou and the First Turkic Khaganate.
564	Battle of Mount Mang (564)	Northern Qi defeats Northern Zhou.
567–568	Battle of Dunkou	Northern Zhou and Western Liang defeats the Chen dynasty.
569–571	Battle of Yiyang and Fenbei	Northern Qi defeats Northern Zhou.
570–578	Taijian Northern Expeditions	A series of expeditions by the Chen dynasty against the Northern Qi and Northern Zhou to recapture territory between the Huai and Yangzi rivers that ultimately ends in failure.
575	Battle of Heyin	Northern Zhou invades Northern Qi but soon withdraws.
576–577	Conquest of Northern Qi by Northern Zhou	Northern Zhou conquers Northern Qi, reunifying northern China.
580	Rebellion of the Three Stewards	Northern Zhou forces under Yang Jian defeat Yuchi Jiong, Wang Jian and Sima Xiaonan.
588–589	Conquest of Chen by Sui	The Sui dynasty conquers the Chen dynasty, unifying China and ending the Northern and Southern dynasties period.

=== Sui dynasty (581–618) ===
Year(s)	Event	Brief description
583–602	Sui–Turkic war	Sui defeats the First Turkic Khaganate, Split twice of the Turkish Khaganate
588–589	Conquest of Chen by Sui	The Sui dynasty conquers the Chen dynasty, unifying China and ending the Northern and Southern dynasties period.
598–614	Goguryeo–Sui War	Goguryeo defeats Sui.
602	Sui–Lý War	The Sui dynasty defeats the Early Lý dynasty, led to the Third Chinese domination of Vietnam.
605	Sui–Lâm Ấp war	The Sui dynasty defeats Champa.
611–619	Wagang Army Uprising	Led by Zhai Rang and later Li Mi
613	Yang Xuangan's Rebellion	
616	Battle of Xingyang	Wagang Army defeats Sui army led by Zhang Xutuo
617	Battle of Huoyi	Li Yuan overthrows the Sui dynasty and establishes the Tang dynasty.
618	Battle of Luoyang	Li Mi defeats Yuwen Huaji and then Wang Shichong defeats Li Mi.
618	Battle of Yanshi	Wang Shichong victory
618	Battle of Qianshuiyuan	Tang victory, end of Qin

=== Tang dynasty (618–907) ===
Year(s)	Event	Brief description
621	Battle of Hulao	Tang forces defeated Dou Jiande.
626	Xuanwu Gate Incident	Li Shimin killed his brothers Li Jiancheng and Li Yuanji in a coup and seized the succession to the Tang throne.
630	Battle of Yinshan	Tang army, led by Li Jing, defeated and conquered Eastern Turks
635	Tang campaign against Tuyuhun	Tang forces defeated and conquered Tuyuhun Khanate.
638	Battle of Songzhou	The Tang dynasty defeated the Tibetan Empire.
639–646	Tang campaign against Xueyantuo	Tang forces defeated and conquered Xueyantuo Khanate.
640–712	Tang campaigns against the Western Turks	Wars between the Tang dynasty and the Western Turks.
640–648	Emperor Taizong's campaign against the Western Regions	The Tang dynasty conquered the oasis states of the Tarim Basin.
640	Tang campaign against Karakhoja	Tang forces defeated and conquered Karakhoja (Gaochang).
644, 648	Tang campaigns against Karasahr	Tang forces defeat and conquered Karasahr.
645	Tang invasion of Tibet	Tang forces invade and occupy Tibet along with its capital Lhasa.
648	Battle of Chabuheluo	Tang alliance defeats Indian Kingdom of Kannauj.
648–649	Tang campaign against Kucha	Tang forces defeated and conquered Kucha.
649	Tang campaign against Kannauj	Tang, Nepalese and Tibetan forces defeated Arunasva's forces.
657	Battle of Irtysh River	Tang forces defeated the Western Turks.
657	Conquest of the Western Turks	Tang forces defeated the Western Turks.
657–729	Sasanids attempts to recuperate the Persian throne.	The Chinese established a "Persian military commandery" in the city of Zābol in Tokharistan, and Peroz (heir of Yazdegerd III) was appointed as Military Commander. Then this government, with the capital at Zirang, fell in 673/674 against the Abbasid Caliphate. After that, Narsieh and Bahram VII went west with his troops to liberate Iranshahr in 679 and fought against the Arabs in Tokharistan for almost thirty years until the Siege of Kamarja.
645–668	Goguryeo–Tang War	The Tang dynasty and Silla defeated Goguryeo. Tang conquered Goguryeo.
663	Battle of Baekgang	Tang and Silla forces defeated Yamato Japanese and Baekje forces.
663	Tibetan campaign against Tuyuhun	Tuyuhun Khanate was destroyed and annexed to the Tibetan Empire.
660	Baekje–Tang War	The Tang dynasty and Silla defeated Baekje. Tang conquered Baekje.
670	Battle of Dafei River	The Tang dynasty defeated the Tibetan Empire.
670–678	Tibetan conquest of the Tarim Basin	Tibetan Empire gained control over large portions of the Tarim Basin and surrounding regions.
670–676	Silla–Tang War	The Silla defeated the Tang dynasty and retook Baekje and part of Goguryeo.
685	Battle of Kaoyu	
697	Battle of Dongxiashi Valley	Khitan defeated the Wu Zhou.
698	Battle of Tianmenling	Mohe forces defeated the Wu Zhou.
711	Battle of Bolchu	
707–751	Umayyad-Tang Wars	Clash between Umayyad Caliphate's conquest of Transoxiana and Tang China's campaigns against the Western Turks for the control of Greater Central Asia. Ended in a victory for the Arab-Islamized Persians and their Tibetan allies.
717	Battle of Aksu	Tang forces defeated an allied forces of Umayyad Muslims, Tibetans and Türgesh Turks.
745–749	Siege of Shibao Fortress	Tang forces defeated Tibetans
750–754	Tianbao War	Nanzhao and Tibetan forces defeated the Tang dynasty
751	Battle of Talas	The Abbasid Caliphate and Tibetan forces defeated the Tang dynasty.
755–763	An–Shi Rebellion	An Lushan, An Qingxu, Shi Siming and Shi Chaoyi led a massive rebellion against Tang dynasty, who repressed it with aid of Abbasids and Uyghurs. Some Abbasid expeditionaries (mainly Iranians or Persianized Turks) settle in Northwestern China and brings Islam in China, becoming the earliest ancestors of Hui people.
756	Battle of Tong Pass	The rebel Yan state defeats Tang dynasty and soon captured Chang'an, the capital of Tang dynasty.
756	Battle of Yongqiu	The Tang dynasty defeated the rebel Yan state.
757	Battle of Suiyang	Pyrrhic victory for the rebel Yan state against Tang forces.
757	Battle of Xiangji Temple	Tang forces defeated rebel Yan forces and recaptured Chang'an.
758–759	Battle of Xiangzhou	Rebel Yan forces defeated Tang forces.
762	Battle of Luoyang	The Tang dynasty decisively defeated the rebel Yan state, fall of Yan.
763	Battle of Chang´an	No casualties, Tibetan Empire strategic victory against Tang dynasty.
765	Battle of Xiyuan	Tang dynasty defeated the Tibetan Empire and Uyghur forces.
781	Battle of Henshui	
801	Battle of Dulu	Tang and Nanzhao forces defeated Tibetans and Abbasid Caliphate slave soldiers near to Kunming
801–802	Battle of Weizhou	Tang forces defeated Tibetans in the South-West front.
817	Conquest of the Western Huai River	
819	Battle of Yanzhou	Tang forces defeated Tibetans in the North-West front.
829	Shilong's invasion of Sichuan	
854–866	Vietnamese uprising and Nanzhao invasion	Tang forces defeated Nanzhao forces.
863	Siege of Songping	Nanzhao captures Songping (modern Hanoi) from Tang forces
874–884	Huang Chao Rebellion	Huang Chao led a rebellion that weakened the Tang dynasty.
897	Battle of Qingkou	Warlord Yang Xingmi defeats other warlord Zhu Wen

=== Five Dynasties and Ten Kingdoms Period (907–960) ===
Year(s)	Event	Brief description
909	Battle of Jisu	Warlord Liu Shouguang defeats his brother Liu Shouwen
919	Battle of Langshan Jiang	Wuyue defeats Yang Wu
923	Jin–Later Liang War	
925	Conquest of Former Shu by Later Tang	
936	Conquest of Later Tang by Later Jin	
938	Battle of Bach Dang	Vietnamese forces defeat the Southern Han
945	Battle of Ting-Hsien	
947	Battle of Fuzhou	Wuyue defeats the Southern Tang and gains control of Fuzhou
955	Siege of Shouzhou	Later Zhou defeats Southern Tang

=== Song dynasty (960–1279) ===
Year(s)	Event	Brief description
964–965	Song conquest of Later Shu	Song conquest of the Later Shu.
970–971	Song conquest of Southern Han	Song conquest of the Southern Han.
974	Conquest of Southern Tang by Song	Song conquest of the Southern Tang.
979	Conquest of Northern Han by Song	Song conquest of the Northern Han.
979	Battle of Gaoliang River	The Khitan Liao dynasty defeats the Song dynasty.
986	Battle of Qigou Pass	Liao forces defeat Song forces.
1004	Battle of Chanzhou	Inconclusive.
1041	Battle of Haoshui River	The Western Xia defeats the Song dynasty.
1048	Battle of Pei-Chou	
1075–1077	Lý–Song War	Indecisive.
1081–1085	Song–Xia wars	Song launches war with Western Xia.
1126–1127	Siege of Dongjing	The Jurchen Jin dynasty decisively defeats the Song dynasty, fall of Northern Song.
1129–1141	Song-Jin Wars	Wars between the Song and Jin dynasties.
1130	Battle of Fuping	Jin forces defeats Song forces.
1140	Battle of Yancheng	Song forces under Yue Fei, defeat Jin forces.
1161	Battle of Tangdao	Song forces defeat Jin forces.
1161	Battle of Caishi	Song forces defeat Jin forces.
1234	Siege of Caizhou	The Mongol Empire and the Song dynasty decisively defeat the Jin dynasty, fall of the Jin dynasty.
1259	Siege of Diaoyu fortress	Song forces defeat the Mongols.
1273	Battle of Xiangyang	The Mongols defeat Song forces.
1279	Battle of Yamen	The Mongols decisively defeat the Song dynasty, fall of Southern Song.

=== Liao dynasty (907–1125) ===
Year(s)	Event	Brief description
	Liao-Song War	
979	Battle of Gaoliang River	The Liao dynasty defeats the Song dynasty.
986	Battle of Qigou Pass	Liao forces defeat Song forces.
993–1019	Goryeo–Khitan War	The Goryeo defeated the Khitan Liao dynasty forces.
1004	Battle of Chanzhou	Inconclusive.
1044	Battle of Hequ	The Western Xia defeats the Liao dynasty.
1114–1125	Liao-Jin War	

=== Jurchen Jin dynasty (1115–1234) ===
Year(s)	Event	Brief description
1126–1127	Siege of Dongjing	The Jurchen Jin dynasty decisively defeats the Song dynasty, fall of Northern Song.
1130	Battle of Fuping	Jin forces defeats Song forces.
1211–1234	Mongol–Jin War	The Mongols defeat and conquer Jin.
1211	Battle of Yehuling	The Mongols defeat Jin.
1215	Battle of Zhongdu	The Mongols defeat Jin.
1229	Battle of Dachangyuan	Jin defeats the Mongols.
1231	Battle of Daohuigu	Jin defeats the Mongols.
1232	Battle of Sanfengshan	The Mongols defeat Jin.
1232	Siege of Kaifeng (1232)	The Mongols capture the Jin city Kaifeng.
1234	Siege of Caizhou	The Mongol Empire and the Song dynasty decisively defeat the Jin dynasty, fall of the Jin dynasty.

=== Yuan dynasty (1271–1368) ===
Year(s)	Event	Brief description
1274, 1281	Mongol invasions of Japan	The Japanese defeat the Mongol/Korean/Chinese invaders.
1277–1287	First Mongol invasion of Burma	Mongol Yuan victory, fall of the Pagan Empire.
1288	Battle of Bạch Đằng	The Vietnamese defeat Yuan forces.
1293	Mongol invasion of Java	Failed Yuan expedition to Java.
1301	Second Mongol invasion of Burma	The Burmese defeat Yuan forces.
1351–1368	Red Turban Rebellion	The Red Turban rebels overthrow the Yuan dynasty.
1359	Red Turban invasions of Goryeo	The Red Turban rebels attack Goryeo.
1360	Battle of Yingtian	
1363	Battle of Lake Poyang	Zhu Yuanzhang defeats Chen Youliang.

=== Ming dynasty (1368–1644) ===
Year(s)	Event	Brief description
1381–1382	Ming conquest of Yunnan	The Ming expelled the last of the loyalist Mongol forces of the Yuan in South China.
1386–1388	Ming–Mong Mao War	The Ming vassalized the Mong Mao.
1387	Ming campaign against the Uriyangkhad horde	The Ming received the surrender of the Naghachu based in Manchuria.
1388	Battle of Buir Lake	The Ming decisively defeated Toghus Temur, Khan of the Northern Yuan dynasty based in Mongolia.
14th century–15th century	Miao Rebellions	Ming forces suppressed rebellions by the Miao and other aboriginal peoples in southwestern China.
1397–1398	Dao Ganmeng rebellion	The Ming forces suppressed a rebellion by Dao Ganmeng against Mong Mao vassalge
1399–1402	Jingnan Campaign	Zhu Di seized the throne from the Jianwen Emperor in a civil war.
15th century–16th century	Ming–Turpan conflict	The Ming clashed with the Turpan kingdom.
1406–1407	Ming–Hồ War	The Ming defeated the Hồ dynasty, led to the Fourth Chinese domination of Vietnam.
1407–1413	Later Trần resistance	Resistance defeated by the Ming.
1410	Ming–Kotte War	The Ming defeated the Kingdom of Kotte.
1415	Ming–Samudera War	The Ming defeated the forces of Sekandar.
1410–1424	Yongle Emperor's campaigns against the Mongols	The Ming launched punitive expeditions against the Eastern Mongols, Oyirad Mongols, and other Mongol tribes.
1418–1427	Lam Sơn uprising	Vietnamese victory, ending Ming rule in Vietnam.
1436–1449	Luchuan–Pingmian campaigns	Punitive campaigns against the Mong Mao
1449	Tumu Crisis	The Mongols defeated the Ming.
1449	Defense of Beijing	The Ming defeated the Mongols
1449–1467, 1475	Miao rebellions under the Ming dynasty	Rebellions defeated.
1510	Prince of Anhua rebellion	The Ming suppressed a revolt by Zhu Zhifan (the Prince of Anhua).
1519	Prince of Ning rebellion	The Ming suppressed a revolt by Zhu Chenhao (the Prince of Ning).
1521	Battle of Tunmen	The Ming defeated the Portuguese in a naval battle.
1522	Battle of Xicaowan	The Ming defeated the Portuguese in a naval battle.
1529–1571	Mongol raids by Altan Khan	Ming signed peace treaty with Altan Khan.
1540s–1560s	Jiajing wokou raids	The Ming defeated the Wokou pirates.
1575–1581	Li Chengliang campaign against Tümen Khan	The Ming defeated the Mongols
1589–1600	Bozhou rebellion	Miao Rebellion against Ming.
1592–1598	Japanese invasions of Korea	The Ming and Joseon defeated Japanese invaders.
1593	Siege of Pyongyang	The Ming and Joseon defeated Japanese invaders.
1597	Siege of Ulsan	Ming and Joseon forces failed to capture Ulsan Castle from the Japanese.
1598	Battle of Sacheon	Ming and Joseon forces failed to capture Sacheon from the Japanese.
1598	Battle of Noryang	Ming and Joseon forces defeated the Japanese in a naval battle.
1618–1683	Qing conquest of the Ming	The Qing dynasty defeated and conquered the Ming.
1618–1619	Battle of Sarhu	The Manchus defeated the Ming.
1621–1629	She-An Rebellion	The Ming defeated the Yongning Rebellion.
1626	Battle of Ningyuan	The Ming defeated the Manchus.
1622–1633	Sino-Dutch conflicts	A series of conflicts between the Ming and the Dutch East India Company that began on Penghu and concluded with Ming victory at the Battle of Liaoluo Bay.
1641–1642	Battle of Songjin	The Qing defeated the Ming.
1642	Battle of Nanyang	
1643	Battle of Tongguan	Ming was defeated by Li Zicheng in Shaanxi.
1644	Battle of Beijing	Rebel forces led by Li Zicheng occupied the capital Beijing and overthrew the Ming dynasty.
1644	Battle of Shanhai Pass	Qing forces allied with former Ming general Wu Sangui and defeated Li Zicheng's forces.

=== Qing dynasty (1644–1912) ===
Year(s)	Event	Brief description
1652–1689	Sino-Russian border conflicts	Border conflicts between the Qing and the Russian Tsardom concluded with Qing victory and the signing of the Treaty of Nerchinsk.
1661–1662	Siege of Fort Zeelandia	Koxinga defeated the Dutch and conquered Taiwan.
1678–1680	Dzungar conquest of Altishahr	Dzungars conquer the Yarkent Chagatai Khanate
1674–1681	Revolt of the Three Feudatories	The Qing suppressed rebellions in Fujian, Guangdong and Yunnan.
1683	Battle of Penghu	The Qing conquered the Kingdom of Tungning in Taiwan.
1690–1755	Dzungar–Qing War	Included the following battles: Battle of Ulan Butung (1690): Withdraw of Dzungar Khanate forces.; Battle of Jao Modo (1696): The Qing defeated Galdan of the Dzungar Khanate.; Battle of the Salween River (1718): The Dzungars defeated the Qing expedition force to Tibet.; Chinese expedition to Tibet (1720) (1720): Qing victory against the Dzungars; Qianlong's Campaign Against the Dzungars and Revolt of the Altishahr Khojas (1755–1759): Qing victory, destruction of the Dzungar Khanate and Qing conquest of Xinjiang.
1756–1757	First Sino–Kazakh War	Included the following battles: Qianlong's Campaign Against the Kazakhs: inconclusive, Kazakh Khanate became a vassal state of Qing.
1765–1767	Second Sino–Kazakh War	Inconclusive, Qing consolidated control Xinjiang and part of Eastern Kazakhstan, complete weakening of the Kazakh Khanate.
1765–1769	Sino-Burmese War	Burmese victory.
1788–1789	Campaign in Vietnam	Tây Sơn dynasty victory, Qing troops retreat from Vietnam.
1790–1791	Sino-Nepalese War	Qing victory.
1794–1804	White Lotus Rebellion	The Qing suppressed a revolt by the White Lotus Society.
1813	Eight Trigrams uprising of 1813	The Qing dynasty suppressed the Bagua Sect uprising.
19th century	Ningpo Massacre	Cantonese pirates (with support from the Qing) defeated Portuguese pirates.
1820s–1850s	Afaqi Khoja revolts	Aq Taghlik Khojas (Afaqi Khojas) attack Xinjiang. Qing victory
1839–1842	First Opium War	The Qing lost to the British and ceded Hong Kong to the latter. Included the following battles: 1839; Battle of Kowloon: Stalemate between the British and the Qing.; Battle of Chuenpi: The British defeated the Qing.; 1840; Capture of Chusan: The British defeated the Qing.; Battle of the Barrier: The British defeated the Qing.; Second Battle of Chuenpi: The British defeated the Qing.; Battle of the Bogue: The British defeated the Qing.; Battle of First Bar: The British defeated the Qing.; Battle of Whampoa: The British defeated the Qing.; 1841; Battle of Canton (March 1841): The British defeated the Qing.; Battle of Canton (May 1841): The British defeated the Qing.; Battle of Amoy: The British defeated the Qing.; Capture of Chusan (1841): The British defeated the Qing.; Battle of Chinhai: The British defeated the Qing.; 1842; Battle of Ningpo: The British defeated the Qing.; Battle of Tzeki: The British defeated the Qing.; Battle of Chapu: The British defeated the Qing.; Battle of Woosung: The British defeated the Qing.; Battle of Chinkiang: The British defeated the Qing.
1841–1842	Sino-Sikh War	Military stalemate between the Sikhs and the Qing. Treaty of Chushul signed.
1850–1864	Taiping Rebellion	The Qing defeated the Taiping Heavenly Kingdom (founded by the Taiping rebels). Included the following battles: Jintian Uprising (1850)Start of the Taiping Rebellion.; Battle of Changsha (1852); Battle of Nanjing (1853): The Taiping rebels captured Nanjing from the Qing.; Battle of Lake Dongting (1854); Battle of Muddy Flat (1854): The British and United States defeat the rebels and together they temporarily defeated the Qing.; Taiping Heavenly Kingdom Northern Expedition(1853–1855)The Qing defeated the Taiping rebels; Battle of Jiangnan (1856): The Taiping rebels defeated the Qing.; Third Battle of Wuhan (1856); Battles of Lake Tai (1857); Battle of Sanhe (1858): The Taiping rebels defeated the Qing.; Battle of Jiujiang (1859); Second rout of the Jiangnan Daying (1860): The Taiping rebels defeated the Qing.; Battle of Anqing (1861); Battle of Guanzhong (1861–1864): The Taiping rebels defeated the Qing.; Battle of Shanghai (1861): The Qing defeated the Taiping rebels with assistance from British and French forces.; Battle of Cixi (1862): The Qing defeated the Taiping rebels.; Battle of Northern Jiangsu (1863); Battle of Changzhou (1863–1864): The Qing defeated the Taiping rebels.; Third Battle of Nanking (1864): The Qing seized Nanjing from the Taiping rebels.; Battle of Hubei (1864): The Qing seized Hubei and southern Anhui from the Taiping rebels.; Battle of Fujian (1865): The Qing recover previously lost territories in Fujian from the Taiping rebels.; Battle of Meizhou (1866)
1854–56	Red Turban Rebellion	The Qing defeated Red Turban rebels in Guangdong
1855–1867	Punti-Hakka Clan Wars	Hakka were allocated their own independent sub-prefecture, Chixi (赤溪镇), which was carved out of south-eastern Taishan, while others were relocated to Guangxi Province, mass emigration to other countries.
1856–1860	Second Opium War	The British, French and Americans defeated the Qing. Included the following battles: Battle of the Pearl River Forts (1856): The Americans defeated the Qing.; Battle of Fatshan Creek (1857): The British defeated the Qing.; First Battle of Taku Forts (1858): The British and French defeated the Qing.; Second Battle of Taku Forts (1859): The Qing defeated the British, French, and Americans.; Third Battle of Taku Forts (1860): The British and French defeated the Qing.; Battle of Palikao (1860): The British and French defeated the Qing.
1854–1873	Miao Rebellion	Uprising of ethnic Miao and other groups in Guizhou province
1856–1873	Panthay Rebellion	The Qing and Hui loyalists suppressed a revolt by the Hui people and other ethnic minorities in Yunnan.
1862–1877	Dungan revolt	The Qing and Hui loyalists suppressed a revolt by the Hui people in northwestern China.
1864–1869	Nian Rebellion	The Qing suppressed a revolt led by Zhang Lexing and others. Includes the following battles: Battle of Gaolozai (1865); Battle of Inlon River (1867): The Qing defeated the Nian rebels.; Battle of Ganyu (1867); Battle of Shouguang (1867)
1866	Formosa Expedition	Paiwan Aboriginals defeat the Americans
1870	Battle of Ürümqi (1870)	The Uzbek controlled kingdom of Kashgaria defeated Hui rebels.
1874	Japanese invasion of Taiwan (1874)	Paiwan Aboriginals fight against the Japanese
1876–1878	Qing reconquest of Xinjiang	The Qing defeat Yaqub Beg's forces in Kashgaria.
1884–1885	Sino-French War	Militarily indecisive, diplomatic victory of the French. Included the following battles/campaigns: 1883; Tonkin Campaign (1883–1886): The French defeated the Qing, Vietnamese and Black Flag Army.; Sơn Tây Campaign: The French defeated the Qing, Vietnamese and Black Flag Army.; Battle of Paper Bridge: The Black Flag Army defeated the French.; 1884; Bắc Ninh Campaign: The French defeated the Qing and Black Flag Army.; Bắc Lệ ambush: The Qing defeated the French.; Battle of Fuzhou: The French defeated the Qing.; Battle of Tamsui: The Qing defeated the French.; Kep Campaign: The French defeated the Qing.; Keelung Campaign (1884–1885): The Qing defeated the French.; 1885; Lạng Sơn Campaign: The French defeated the Qing.; Battle of Shipu: The French defeated the Qing.; Battle of Zhenhai: The Qing repel the French, Qing defensive victory.; Siege of Tuyên Quang: The French defeated the Qing and Black Flag Army.; Battle of Hoa Moc: The French defeated the Qing and Black Flag Army.; Battle of Bang Bo: The Qing and Black Flag Army defeated the French.; Battle of Phu Lam Tao: The Qing and Black Flag Army defeated the French.; Pescadores Campaign: The French defeated the Qing.
1884	Gapsin Coup	The Qing supported government defeated the Japanese supported coup.
1894–1895	First Sino-Japanese War	The Japanese defeated the Qing. Included the following battles: 1894; Battle of Pungdo: The Japanese defeated the Qing.; Battle of Seonghwan: The Japanese defeated the Qing.; Battle of Pyongyang: The Japanese defeated the Qing.; Battle of the Yalu River: The Japanese defeated the Qing.; Battle of Jiuliancheng: The Japanese defeated the Qing.; Battle of Lushunkou: The Japanese defeated the Qing.; 1895; Battle of Weihaiwei: The Japanese defeated the Qing.; Battle of Yingkou: The Japanese defeated the Qing.
1895–1896	Dungan revolt	The Qing and Muslim loyalists suppressed a revolt by Muslim forces in western China.
1895	Japanese invasion of Taiwan (1895)	The Japanese occupy Taiwan.
1899–1901	Boxer Rebellion	The Eight-Nation Alliance defeated the Boxer rebels and Qing forces. Included the following battles in 1900: Battle of Dagu Forts: The Eight-Nation Alliance defeated Qing forces.; Battle of Tientsin: The Eight-Nation Alliance defeated Qing forces.; Battle of Shanhai Pass: Inconclusive.; Battle of Beicang: The Eight-Nation Alliance defeated Qing forces.; Battle of Yangcun: The Eight-Nation Alliance defeated Qing forces.; Russian invasion of Manchuria: The Russians defeated the Boxer rebels and Qing.; Battle of Pai-t'ou-tzu: The Boxer rebels and Qing forces defeated the Russians.; Battles on Amur River: The Russians defeated the Boxer rebels and Qing forces.; Battle of Peking: The Eight-Nation Alliance defeated the Boxer rebels and Qing forces.; Seymour Expedition (Battle of Langfang): The Boxer rebels and Qing forces defeated the Eight-Nation Alliance.; Siege of the International Legations: The Boxers assault the Legations in Beijing.
1911–1912	1911 Revolution	The 2,132 years of imperial rule in China was ended. The Republic of China replaces the Qing dynasty to rule China: Second Guangzhou Uprising：Qing Victory; The Wuchang uprising: Tongmenghui victory; Battle of Yangxia：Qing Victory; Battle of Changsha (1911)：Tongmenghui victory; 1911 Revolution in Xinjiang：Revolutionary victory; Mongolian Revolution of 1911：Mongolian Nationalist Victory

== Modern China ==
=== Yuan Shikai-led Republic of China ===
- Bai Lang Rebellion (1911–1913)
- Second Chinese Revolution (1913)
- World War I (1914–1918)
- National Protection War (1915–1916)

=== Warlord Era ===
- Manchu Restoration (1917)
- Kuomintang pacification of Qinghai (1917–1949)
  - Battle of Xiahe (1929)
- Occupation of Mongolia (1919–1921)
- Zhili–Anhui War (1920)
- Guangdong–Guangxi War (1920–1922)
- Spirit Soldier rebellions (1920–1926)
- Mongolian Revolution (1921)
- First Zhili–Fengtian War (1922)
- Jiangsu–Zhejiang War (1924)
- Second Zhili–Fengtian War (1924)
- Anti-Fengtian War (1925)
- Yunnan–Guangxi War (1925–1927)
- Northern Expedition (1926–1928)
  - April 12 Incident (1927)
- Muslim conflict in Gansu (1927–1930)
- Red Spears' uprising in Shandong (1928–1929)
- Warlord Rebellion in northeastern Shandong
- Central Plains War (1929–1930)
  - Chiang-Gui War (1929)
- Han–Liu War (1932)
- Two-Liu war (1934)
- War in Ningxia (1934)

=== Chinese Civil War (First phase, 1927–1936) ===
- 1927 — Shanghai massacre
- 1927 — Nanchang Uprising
- 1927 — Autumn Harvest Uprising
- 1927 — Guangzhou Uprising
- 1930–31 — First Encirclement Campaign
- 1931 — Second Encirclement Campaign
- 1931 — Third Encirclement Campaign
- 1932 — Fourth Encirclement Campaign
- 1933–34 — Fifth Encirclement Campaign
- 1933–34 — Fujian Rebellion
- 1934–1936 — Long March
  - 1935 — Battles at Luding Bridge

=== Sino-Tibetan War (1930–1932) ===
- Qinghai–Tibet War (1932)

=== Xinjiang Wars (First phase, 1931–1937) ===
- Kumul Rebellion (1931–1934)
  - Kirghiz rebellion (1932)
  - Battle of Aksu (1933)
  - Kizil massacre (1933)
  - Battle of Sekes Tash (1933)
  - Battle of Kashgar (1933)
  - Battle of Ürümqi (1933)
  - Battle of Toksun (1933)
  - First Battle of Ürümqi (1933)
  - Second Battle of Ürümqi (1933–1934)
  - Battle of Kitai (1934)
  - Battle of Kashgar (1934)
  - Battle of Yangi Hissar (1934)
  - Battle of Yarkand (1934)
  - Battle of Khotan
  - Battle of Tutung (1934)
  - Battle of Dawan Cheng (1934)
  - Soviet invasion of Xinjiang (1934)
- Charkhlik revolt (1935)
- Islamic rebellion in Xinjiang (1937)

=== Second Sino-Japanese War (1931–1945, part of World War II from 1941) ===
- 1931 — Mukden Incident
- 1931–32 — Japanese invasion of Manchuria
- 1931 — Jiangqiao Campaign
- 1931 — Battle for Nenjiang Bridge
- 1931–1942 — Pacification of Manchukuo
- 1931–1932 — Jinzhou Operation
- 1932 — Battle of Harbin
- 1932 — First Battle of Shanghai
- 1932 — Attack on Pingdingshan
- 1932 — Attack on Fushun
- 1933 — Battle of the Great Wall
- 1933 — Battle of Rehe
- 1933–1936 — Southern Mongolian campaign (1933–36)
- 1936 — Suiyuan Campaign
- 1937 — Battle of Pochonbo
- 1937 — Lugou Bridge Incident
- 1937 — Battle of Beiping–Tianjin
- 1937–1945 — Aerial engagements of the Second Sino-Japanese War
- 1937 — Operation Chahar
- 1937 — Second Battle of Shanghai
- 1937 — Battle of Jianqiao
- 1937 — Peiking–Suiyuan Railway Operation
- 1937 — Beiping–Hankou Railway Operation
- 1937 — Tianjin–Pukou Railway Operation
- 1937 — Battle of Taiyuan
- 1937 — Battle of Pingxingguan
- 1937 — Battle of Sihang Warehouse
- 1937 — Battle of Xinkou
- 1937 — Battle of Nanking
- 1938 — Battle of Taierzhuang
- 1938 — Battle of Xuzhou
- 1938 — Battle of Northern and Eastern Henan
- 1938 — Battle of Lanfeng
- 1938 — Amoy Operation
- 1938 — Taihoku Air Strike
- 1938 — Bombing of Chongqing
- 1938 — Battle of Wuhan
- 1938 — Battle of Xinfeng
- 1938 — Battle of Wanjialing
- 1938 — Canton Operation
- 1939 — Hainan Island Operation
- 1939 — Battle of Nanchang
- 1939 — Battle of Suixian–Zaoyang
- 1939 — Swatow Operation
- 1939 — First Battle of Changsha
- 1939–1940 — Battle of South Guangxi
- 1939–1940 — Battle of Kunlun Pass
- 1940 — Battle of West Suiyuan
- 1940 — Battle of Wuyuan
- 1940 — Battle of Zaoyang–Yichang
- 1940 — Hundred Regiments Offensive
- 1940 — Central Hubei Operation
- 1941 — New Fourth Army incident
- 1941 — Western Hubei Operation
- 1941 — Battle of South Henan
- 1941 — Battle of Shanggao
- 1941 — Battle of South Shanxi
- 1941 — Second Battle of Changsha
- 1941 — December 1941 Chinese Nationalist guerrilla warfare
- 1941 — Battle of Hong Kong
- 1941 — Bombing of Singapore
- 1941–1942 — Third Battle of Changsha
- 1942–1945 — South-East Asian theatre of World War II
- 1942 — 1942 Bombing of Vietnam
- 1942 — Malayan campaign
- 1942 — Battle of Singapore
- 1942–1945 — Anti-Japanese resistance movement in Malaya during World War II
- 1942–1945 — Anti-Japanese resistance movements in the Dutch East Indies during World War II
- 1942 — Battle of Sarimbun Beach
- 1942 — Battle of Kranji
- 1942 — Battle of Bukit Timah
- 1942–1945 — Burma campaign (1942–1945)
- 1942 — Japanese invasion of Burma
- 1942 — Battle of the Yunnan–Burma Road
- 1942 — Battle of Tachiao
- 1942 — Battle of Oktwin
- 1942 — Battle of Toungoo
- 1942 — The Hump
- 1942 — Battle of Yenangyaung
- 1942 — Combined Japanese-Thai invasion of the Shan States
- 1942 — Thai invasion of the Kayah State
- 1942 — Burma campaign (1942–1943)
- 1942 — Zhejiang-Jiangxi campaign
- 1942–1945 — Philippine resistance against Japan
- 1942 — Battle of the Dwarf Mountain
- 1943 — Thai invasion of Yunnan
- 1943 — Operation North of the Yangtze
- 1943 — Battle of Guangzhouwan
- 1943 — Battle of West Hubei
- 1943 — Weinan Campaign
- 1943 — Linnan Campaign
- 1943–1945 — Battle of Northern Burma and Western Yunnan
- 1943 — Battle of Changde
- 1943 — 1943 Bombing of Vietnam
- 1943 — 1943 Bombing of Taiwan
- 1944–1945 — Bombing of South-East Asia (1944–1945)
- 1944 — Burma campaign (1944)
- 1944 — Battle of Yupang
- 1944 — Battle of the Hukawng Valley
- 1944 — Battle of Maingkwan
- 1944 — Battle of Waluban
- 1944 — Operation Ichi-Go
- 1944 — Battle of Central Henan
- 1944 — Battle of Mogaung
- 1944 — Siege of Myitkyina
- 1944 — Battle of Tengchong
- 1944 — Fourth Battle of Changsha
- 1944 — Battle of Mount Song
- 1944 — Battle of Longling
- 1944 — Battle of Hengyang
- 1944 — Battle of Guilin–Liuzhou
- 1944–1945 — Burma campaign (1944–1945)
- 1944 — Battle of Mangshi
- 1944 — Battle of Mongyu
- 1944 — Battle of Wanding
- 1944 — Battle of Lashio
- 1944 — Battle of Hsipaw
- 1945 — Battle of West Henan–North Hubei
- 1945 — Battle of West Hunan
- 1945 — 1945 Guangxi campaign

=== Xinjiang Wars (Second phase, 1944–1949) ===
- 1944–1949 — Ili Rebellion
  - 1946–1948 — Battle of Baitag Bogd
  - 1949 — Incorporation of Xinjiang into the People's Republic of China

=== Chinese Civil War (Second phase, 1945–1949) ===
Conflicts in the Chinese Civil War in the post-World War II era are listed chronologically by the starting dates.

==== 1945 ====
- July 21 – August 8, 1945 — Yetaishan Campaign
- August 13–19, 1945 — Southern Jiangsu Campaign
- August 13–16, 1945 — Counteroffensive in Eastern Hubei
- August 15–23, 1945 — Battle of Baoying
- August 16–19, 1945 — Battle of Yongjiazhen
- August 17–27, 1945 — Battle of Tianmen
- August 17–25, 1945 — Pingyu Campaign
- August 17 – September 11, 1945 — Linyi Campaign
- August 24, 1945 — Battle of Wuhe
- August 26–27, 1945 — Battle of Yinji
- August 26 – September 22, 1945 — Huaiyin–Huai'an Campaign
- August 29 – September 1, 1945 — Xinghua Campaign
- September 1–13, 1945 — Battle of Dazhongji
- September 4–5, 1945 — Battle of Lingbi
- September 5–8, 1945 — Zhucheng Campaign
- September 5–22, 1945 — Shanghe Campaign
- September 6–9, 1945 — Battle of Lishi
- September 7–10, 1945 — Pingdu Campaign
- September 8–12, 1945 — Taixing Campaign
- September 10 – October 12, 1945 — Shangdang Campaign
- September 13–17, 1945 — Wudi Campaign
- September 18, 1945 — Battle of Xiangshuikou
- September 21, 1945 — Battle of Rugao
- September 29 – November 2, 1945 — Weixian–Guangling–Nuanquan Campaign
- October, 1945 – October, 1945 — Battle of Shicun
- October 3 – November 10, 1945 — Yancheng Campaign
- October 17 – December 14, 1945 — Tongbai Campaign
- October 18, 1945 — Battle of Houmajia
- October 22 – November 2, 1945 — Handan Campaign
- October 25 – November 16, 1945 — Battle of Shanhai Pass
- October 26–30, 1945 — Campaign Along the Datong–Puzhou Railway
- November, 1945 – April, 1947 — Campaign to Suppress Bandits in Northeast China
- November 3–4, 1945 — Battle of Jiehezhen
- December 19–21, 1945 — Battle of Shaobo
- December 19–26, 1945 — Gaoyou–Shaobo Campaign
- December 21–30, 1945 — Battle of Tangtou–Guocun

==== 1946 ====
- January 19–26, 1946 — Houma Campaign
- March 15–17, 1946 — Battle of Siping
- April 10–15, 1946 — Jinjiatun Campaign
- April 17 – May 19, 1946 — Campaign to Defend Siping
- June 22 – August 31, 1946 — Campaign of the North China Plain Pocket
- June 12 – September 1, 1946 — Campaign along the Southern Section of Datong–Puzhou Railway
- July 31 – September 16, 1946 — Datong–Jining Campaign
  - August 10–22, 1946 — Longhai Campaign
- August 14 – September 1, 1946 — Datong–Puzhou Campaign
- August 21 – September 22, 1946 — Battle of Huaiyin–Huai'an
- August 25 – August, 1946 — Battle of Rugao–Huangqiao
- September 2–8, 1946 — Dingtao Campaign
- September 22–24, 1946 — Linfen–Fushan Campaign
- October 10–20, 1946 — Battle of Kalgan
- November 10–11, 1946 — Battle of Nanluo–Beiluo
- November 22, 1946 – January 1, 1947 — Lüliang Campaign
- December 17, 1946 – April 1, 1947 — Linjiang Campaign
- December 31, 1946 – January 30, 1947 — Battle of Guanzhong
- Pei-ta-shan Incident

==== 1947 ====
- January 21–28, 1947 — Campaign to the South of Baoding
- April 24–25, 1947 — Battle of Niangziguan
- April 27–28, 1947 — Battle of Tang'erli
- May 13–16, 1947 — Menglianggu Campaign
- May 13 – July 1, 1947 — Summer Offensive of 1947 in Northeast China
- May 28–31, 1947 — Heshui Campaign
- June 11, 1947 – March 13, 1948 — Siping Campaign
- June 26 – July 6, 1947 — Campaign to the North of Baoding
- July 17–29, 1947 — Nanma–Linqu Campaign
- August 13, 1947 – August 18, 1947 — Meridian Ridge Campaign
- September 2–12, 1947 — Campaign to the North of Daqing River
- September 14 – November 5, 1947 — Autumn Offensive of 1947 in Northeast China
- October 2–10, 1947 — Sahe Mountain Campaign
- October 29 – November 25, 1947 — Campaign in the Eastern Foothills of the Funiu Mountains
- December 15, 1947 – March 15, 1948 — Winter Offensive of 1947 in Northeast China
- December 7–9, 1947 — Battle of Phoenix Peak
- December 9, 1947 – June 15, 1948 — Western Tai'an Campaign
- December 11, 1947 – January, 1948 — Counter-Eradication Campaign in Dabieshan
- December 20, 1947 – June 1948 — Jingshan–Zhongxiang Campaign

==== 1948 ====
- January 2–7, 1948 — Gongzhutun Campaign
- March 7 – May 18, 1948 — Linfen Campaign
- March 11–21, 1948 — Zhoucun–Zhangdian Campaign
- May 12 – June 25, 1948 — Hebei–Rehe–Chahar Campaign
- May 23 – October 19, 1948 — Siege of Changchun
- May 29 – July 18, 1948 — Yanzhou Campaign
- June 17–19, 1948 — Battle of Shangcai
- September 12 – November 12, 1948 — Liaoshen Campaign
- October 5, 1948 – April 24, 1949 — Taiyuan Campaign
- October 7–15, 1948 — Battle of Jinzhou
- October 10–15, 1948 — Battle of Tashan
- November 6, 1948 – January 10, 1949 — Huaihai Campaign
- November 15, 1948 – January 11, 1949 — Battle of Jiulianshan
- November 22 – December 15, 1948 — Shuangduiji Campaign
- November 29, 1948 – January 31, 1949 — Pingjin Campaign
- Pei-ta-shan Incident

==== 1949 ====
- January 3–15, 1949 — Tianjin Campaign
- April, 1949 – June, 1950 — Campaign to Suppress Bandits in Northern China
- April, 1949 – June, 1953 — Campaign to Suppress Bandits in Central and Southern China
- May 12 – June 2, 1949 — Shanghai Campaign
- May 17 – June 16, 1949 — Xianyang Campaign
- August 9–27, 1949 — Lanzhou Campaign
- August 9, 1949 – December, 1953 — Campaign to Suppress Bandits in Eastern China
- August 24, 1949 – September, 1951 — Campaign to Suppress Bandits in Fujian
- September 5–24, 1949 — Ningxia Campaign
- September 5, 1949 – March, 1950 — Campaign to Suppress Bandits in Dabieshan
- October 25–27, 1949 — Battle of Guningtou
- November, 1949 – July, 1953 — Campaign to Suppress Bandits in Northwestern China
- November 1–28, 1949 — Campaign to the North of Nanchuan County
- November 3–5, 1949 — Battle of Dengbu Island
- November 17 – December 1, 1949 — Bobai Campaign
- December 3–26, 1949 — Campaign to Suppress Bandits in Lianyang
- December 6–7, 1949 — Battle of Liangjiashui
- December 7–14, 1949 — Battle of Lianyang
- December 11–27, 1949 — Chengdu campaign
- December 17–18, 1949 — Battle of Jianmenguan

==== 1950 ====
- January, 1950 – June, 1955 — Campaign to Suppress Bandits in Wuping
- January 15, 1950 – May 1951 — Campaign to Suppress Bandits in Guangxi
- January 19–31, 1950 — Battle of Bamianshan
- February – December 1953 — Campaign to Suppress Bandits in Southwestern China
- February 4 – December, 1950 — Campaign to Suppress Bandits in Longquan
- February 14–20, 1950 — Battle of Tianquan
- March 3, 1950 — Battle of Nan'ao Island
- March 5 – May 1, 1950 — Landing Operation on Hainan Island
- March 29 – May 7, 1950 — Battle of Yiwu
- May 11, 1950 — Battle of Dongshan Island
- May 25 – August 7, 1950 — Wanshan Archipelago Campaign
- August 9, 1950 — Battle of Nanpéng Island
- September, 1950 – January, 1951 — Campaign to Suppress Bandits in Northern Guangdong
- September 2 – November 29, 1950 — Campaign to Suppress Bandits in northeastern Guizhou
- October 15 – November, 1950 — Campaign to Suppress Bandits in the Border Region of Hunan–Hubei–Sichuan
- October 15 – December, 1950 — Campaign to Suppress Bandits in Western Hunan
- December 13, 1950 – February, 1951 — Campaign to Suppress Bandits in Shiwandashan
- December 20, 1950 – February, 1951 — Campaign to Suppress Bandits in Liuwandashan

==== 1951 ====
- January 8 – February, 1951 — Campaign to Suppress Bandits in Yaoshan
- April 15 – September, 1951, — Campaign to Suppress Bandits in Western Guangxi

==== 1952 ====
- April 11–15, 1952 — Battle of Nanri Island
- June 13 – September 20, 1952 — Campaign to Suppress Bandits in Heishui
- September 20 – October 20, 1952 — Battle of Nanpēng Archipelago

==== 1953 ====
- May 29, 1953 — Battle of Dalushan Islands
- July 16–18, 1953 — Dongshan Island Campaign

==== 1955 ====
- January 18–20, 1955 — Battle of Yijiangshan Islands
- January 19 – February 26, 1955 — Battle of Dachen Archipelago

==== 1950–1958 ====
- Kuomintang Islamic insurgency

==== 1960 ====
- November 14, 1960 – February 9, 1961 — Campaign at the China-Burma Border

==== 1965 ====
- May 1, 1965 — Battle of Dong-Yin
- August 6, 1965 — Battle of Dongshan
- November 13–14, 1965 — Battle of East Chongwu

=== Annexation of Tibet (1950) ===
- Battle of Chamdo (1950)
- Lhasa Uprising (1959)

=== Korean War (1950–1953) ===
- 1950 – Battle of Onjong
- 1950 – Battle of Unsan
- 1950 – Battle of the Ch'ongch'on River
- 1950 – Battle of Chosin Reservoir
- 1951 – Third Battle of Seoul
- 1951 – Battle of Hoengsong
- 1951 – Battle of Chipyong-ni
- 1951 – Battle of the Imjin River
- 1951 – Battle of Kapyong
- 1952 – Battle of Old Baldy
- 1952 – Battle of White Horse
- 1952 – Battle of Triangle Hill
- 1953 – Battle of Pork Chop Hill
- 1953 – Battle of the Hook
- 1953 – Battle of Kumsong

=== Sino-Indian War (1962) ===
The Sino-Indian War between China and India occurred in October–November 1962. A disputed Himalayan border was the main cause of the war. There had been a series of violent border skirmishes between the two countries after the 1959 Tibetan uprising, when India granted asylum to the Dalai Lama. India initiated a defensive Forward Policy from 1960 to hinder Chinese military patrols and logistics, in which it placed outposts along the border, including several north of the McMahon Line, the eastern portion of the Line of Actual Control proclaimed by Chinese Premier Zhou Enlai in 1959.

=== Nathu La and Cho La clashes (1967) ===
The Nathu La and Cho La clashes took place from September–October 1967. The Nathu La clashes started on 11 September 1967, when China's People's Liberation Army (PLA) launched an attack on Indian posts at Nathu La, and lasted till 15 September 1967. In October 1967, another military duel took place at Cho La and ended on the same day. According to independent sources, India achieved "decisive tactical advantage" and managed to hold its own against and push back Chinese forces. Many PLA fortifications at Nathu La were destroyed, where the Indian troops drove back the attacking Chinese forces. Another battle took place at Cho La a few kilometers south a few days later. The military duel lasted one day, during which the Chinese were driven away, which boosted Indian morale. According to Indian Maj. Gen. Sheru Thapliyal, the Chinese were forced to withdraw nearly three kilometers in Cho La during the clash. The Defence Ministry of India reported: 88 killed and 163 wounded on the Indian side, while 340 killed and 450 wounded on the Chinese side, during the two incidents.

=== Sino-Soviet border conflict (1969) ===
- 1969 – Zhenbao Island

=== Vietnam War (1955–1975) ===
- 1974 – Paracel Islands

=== Laotian Civil War (1958–1975) ===
- 1967 – 1967 Opium War

=== Sino-Vietnamese War (1979) ===
- 1979 – Battle of Cao Ba Lanh
- 1979 – Battle of Móng Cái
- 1979 – 1979 Battle of Đồng Đăng
- 1979 – Battle of Lao Cai
- 1979 – Battle of Cam Duong
- 1979 – 1979 Battle of Cao Bằng
- 1979 – 1979 Battle of Lạng Sơn

=== Sino-Vietnamese conflicts (1979–1991) ===
- 1981 – Battle of Fakashan
- 1984 – Battle of Laoshan
- 1986 – Operation Blue Sword-B
- 1988 – Johnson South Reef Skirmish

== See also ==
- Outline of the military history of the People's Republic of China
- Outline of the Chinese Civil War
- List of wars involving the People's Republic of China
- List of wars involving the Republic of China
- List of wars involving Taiwan
