= Campaign to Suppress Bandits in Wuping =

1950 military campaign

- Part of the Chinese Civil War
Date	January 1950 – June 1955
Location	Wuping County, Fujian, China
Result	Communist victory

Belligerents
Republic of China Army	People's Liberation Army

Commanders and leaders
Jiang Deping; Lin Zha	Ruan Wenbing; Li Feng

Strength
3,200	3,500

Casualties and losses
3,143	"Low"

The Campaign to Suppress Bandits in Wuping (Chinese: 武平剿匪) was a counter-insurgency campaign waged by the Communist People's Liberation Army (PLA) against Kuomintang (Nationalist) guerrillas in Wuping, Fujian province. The campaign was part of the aftermath the Chinese Civil War; most of the Nationalist forces were bandits and regular troops who had been left behind after when the Nationalist government withdrew from mainland China. The campaign ended in a Communist victory.

== Order of battle ==
Nationalists:

- Fujian–Guangdong Column
- Ding Riverine Protecting Group

People's Liberation Army:

- 259th Regiment (Infantry)
- 5th Regiment of Guangdong Xingmei Military Sub-region
- Garrison Regiment of Longyan Military Sub-region
- Wuping County Garrison Group (Battalion)

== Campaign ==
After Nationalists withdrew from Wuping, they sent many agents and military professionals to local bandits to help the latter to wage a guerrilla war against the Communists. In January 1951, the Communists mobilized several units totaling over three thousand to eradicate local bandits, headed by the Communist 259th Infantry Regiment. Ruan Wenbing (阮文炳), the commander of the Communist 259th Regiment and Li Feng (李峰), the political commissar of the Communist 259th Regiment were joined by the local Communist Party secretary Chen Zhongping (陈仲平) of Wuping County to form the headquarters of this bandit suppression campaign. The Communists divided Wuping County into four regions, each assigned to a particular military unit:

- PLA 259th Regiment is responsible for the northern region
- PLA 5th Regiment of Guangdong Xingmei Military Sub-region was responsible for the southern region
- PLA Wuping County Garrison Group was responsible for the western region
- PLA Garrison Regiment of Longyan Military Sub-region was responsible for the eastern region.

In addition to deploying the military and police, the general populace was also mobilized in the campaign, with great success. Military formations were primarily fighting on the platoon scale, and supported by local populace. In February 1950, after six days and six nights of combing through the mountains by the Communist force, over ninety bandits were annihilated. Meanwhile, political pressure also produced results. The Nationalist Ding Riverine Protecting Group in the eastern region and bandits in the northern region totaling over a hundred surrendered to the Communists without a fight. In October 1950, in the region of Fresh Water Pond (Xianshuitang, 鲜水塘) of Shifang (十方) Hamlet, the highest ranking Nationalist commander, Jiang Deping (蒋德平), the commander-in-chief of Fujian–Guangdong Column and his deputy, Lin Zha (林叱) were captured with three of their staff members. By late October 1950, in the border region of Wuping County and Shanghang County, Communist forces succeeded in completely annihilating bandits headed by Lin Hanqiang (林汉强) totaling over a hundred, after combing through their hiding place in Huangqing (皇庆山) Mountain continuously for four nights and three days.

By 1951, bandits headed by Lan Qiguan (蓝启观) totaling over four hundred fifty were annihilated, including over four hundred being captured alive, and an additional eight hundred defected to the Communist side. With the organized bands of bandits eradicated, the Communist main force withdrew from the region by the end of the year, and beginning in 1952, the campaign turned to mopping up operations carried out by militias and police. In the summer of 1952, bandit chieftain Zhong Guoxun (钟国勋) and his allies captured alive, and in the spring of 1953, bandit chieftain Zhong Yong (钟勇) and his allies were also captured. By June 1955, all bandits in the local area were annihilated and the campaign concluded with Communist victory. A total of 3,143 bandits were annihilated, including 533 killed, 998 captured, and 1,592 defected to the Communist side. Additionally, the Communist victory also included capturing 18 machine guns, 11 sub-machine guns, 490 handguns and 3734 rifles, 20 artillery pieces, and two radio sets.

== Outcome ==
Although sharing the common anti-Communist goal, the Nationalist guerrilla and insurgency warfare was largely handicapped by the enlistment of bandits, many of whom had fought and killed Nationalist troops earlier in the eradication / pacification campaign, and also looted, kidnapped and even killed landlords and business owners, an important faction that supported the Nationalist government, but now must united against the common enemy, which is half-hearted at the best. Compounding the problem further with additional differences within the ranks of the Nationalist guerrillas themselves, the futile Nationalist guerrilla and insurgency warfare against its Communist enemy was destined to fail.

== See also ==
- Outline of the Chinese Civil War
- Outline of the military history of the People's Republic of China
- List of battles of the Chinese Civil War
- National Revolutionary Army
- History of the People's Liberation Army
- Chinese Civil War
