= Shi Le's invasion of You Province =

Campaign by Shi Le to capture the Western Jin governor Wang Jun (314)

- Part of Upheaval of the Five Barbarians
Date	March–3 April 314 AD
Location	Hebei
Result	Han victory

Belligerents
Han-Zhao	Western Jin

Commanders and leaders
Shi Le	Wang Jun (POW)

Strength
Unknown	Unknown

Casualties and losses
Unknown	+10,000

Shi Le's invasion of You province was fought between Han-Zhao general, Shi Le and the Western Jin Inspector of You province, Wang Jun in the spring of 314. After many years of war between the two sides, Shi Le successfully deceived Wang Jun by feigning submission and showing support for his claim to the imperial throne. As a result, he was able to pass through Wang Jun's territory with no resistance and launch a surprise attack on his capital at Jicheng. The campaign concluded in victory for the Han and Wang Jun's capture, although strong pockets of Jin resistance remained in You and Qing provinces.

== Background ==
In December 312, the tides of war between the Han-Zhao general, Shi Le and the Western Jin Inspector of You province, Wang Jun began to shift in favour of the former following the battle of Xiangguo, as Shi Le was able to convince the Duan-Xianbei tribe of Liaoxi to break off their alliance with Wang Jun. Deprived of his elite Xianbei cavalry, Shi Le was now able to defeat Wang Jun's forces with relative ease; shortly after his victory at Xiangguo, Shi Le attacked Xindu and killed Wang Jun's Inspector of Ji province, Wang Xiang (王象).

In April or May 313, Shi Le attacked Shangbai (上白; southeast of present-day Guangzong County, Hebei) and killed Wang Jun's Inspector of Qing province, the Qihuo general Li Yun (李惲), who Wang Jun then replaced with his fellow Qihuo, Bo Sheng (薄盛). In June or July, Shi Le ordered his general, Kong Chang to invade Dingling (定陵; in present-day Xiangcheng County, Henan) and deliver the same fate to Wang Jun's Inspector of Yan province, Tian Hui (田徽). After Tian Hui's defeat, Bo Sheng brought his soldiers to surrender. These victories prompted many of the counties and commanderies to submit to Shi Le, while the Wuhuan tribes allied to Wang Jun also began secretly defecting to Shi Le.

Wang Jun launched a punitive campaign against the Duan in April or May 313 with his rivals, Tuoba Yilu and Murong Hui, but was unsuccessful. Additionally, his territory suffered from locust plagues and droughts for successive years. Despite these setbacks, he remained assured of his ambitions to become emperor. Records detail his deteriorating behaviour, including his belief in a prophecy that he would replace the Han and his resort to violence against detractors of his imperial aspirations. He also stopped attending to political matters, leaving them in the hands of Zao Song (棗嵩), Zhu Shuo (朱碩) and Tan Heng (貪橫), who badly mismanaged his territory with their policies. As a result, many of the local gentry resented him while many people left him to join the Xianbei.

== Prelude ==
=== Shi Le feigns submission ===
In November or December 313, Shi Le wished to launch a direct attack on Wang Jun but remained wary. He wanted to send envoys to better observe the situation, while his advisors suggested that they should instead be exchanging letters with Wang Jun as equals, following the example of the friendly rivalry between the enemy generals, Lu Kang and Yang Hu during the Three Kingdoms period. Thus, Shi Le consulted with Zhang Bin, who told him:

Wang Jun borrowed the might of the three tribes (Duan, Yuwen and Wuhuan) while exercising imperial power and facing south. Ostensibly, he claims to be a vassal of Jin, but deep down he harbours rebellious ambitions and is seeking heroes to aid in his cause. General, your prestige is known throughout the world; your presence or absence determines life and death, and your whereabouts is of great importance. Wang Jun's desire for a general is like Xiang Yu's desire for the service of Han Xin. Now, the envoys of a domineering party will show no sincerity, which breeds suspicion and reveals signs of a plot. Even the most clever of strategies will have no use in this situation. Those who wish to accomplish great things must first be humble, acting as vassals and offering obeisance. I'm afraid we have yet to win his trust. As for the example of Yang Hu and Lu Kang, I fail to see how this is feasible.

Shi Le agreed, so he sent Wang Zichun (王子春) and Dong Zhao (董肇) as his envoys to present Wang Jun with treasures and a petition stating his intention to submit. In the petition, he addressed himself as a "mere barbarian" and flattered Wang Jun, encouraging him to take the imperial throne. Wang Jun was pleased by his apparent change of heart, and when he asked the envoys on why he should trust him, Zichun explained that despite his martial strength, the masses are unlikely to accept a "barbarian" like Shi Le as their king or emperor. Elated, Wang Jun turned the two envoys into minor marquises before sending Shi Le a positive response and a large sum of funds.

The envoys also presented Zao Song with the petition and bribed him. Coincidentally, a marshal of Wang Jun, You Tong (游統), secretly sent a messenger to Shi Le offering to surrender with his city of Fanyang at the time. Shi Le capitalized on the situation by beheading the messenger and sending his head to Wang Jun. You Tong was spared, but Wang Jun was impressed by Shi Le's loyalty and began to trust him even more.

=== Wang Jun presents Shi Le a deer tail ===
On 22 February 314, Wang Jun sent his own envoys to Xiangguo, returning his envoys and presenting him with a letter along with a deer tail. Beforehand, Shi Le hid all his best soldiers and equipments, only showing his weaker troops and empty stores. He faced north towards Wang Jun's court and bowed before the envoys as he accepted the letter. When he was shown the deer tail, he pretended to be afraid to grasp it and had it hung up on his wall. He would perform obeisance to it day and night, saying "Though I do not see Lord Wang himself, seeing the gift he has bestowed me is the same as seeing him."

Shi Le sent Dong Zhao back to Wang Jun to inform him that he would be visiting his base at Jicheng to hail him as Emperor in the middle of the third month (March or April). He also requested to Zao Song to be appointed the Governor of Bing province and the Duke of Guangping. Behind their backs, Shi Le asked Wang Zichun about Wang Jun's situation and discovered that he was severely mismanaging his domain through his harsh punishments, heavy taxes and corvee labour as well as wasteful building projects. Zichun also reported that he refused to send aid to people affected by a flood the previous year, and that Wang Jun was already creating imperial offices while boasting that Liu Bang and Cao Cao could not compare to him. The report assured Shi Le that he would soon capture Wang Jun.

Meanwhile, Wang Jun's envoys, falling for the ruse, returned to their lord and informed him that Shi Le was sincere in his submission, adding that he was weak and isolated. Wang Jun was well pleased by their finding, so much so that he did not make any preparations against Shi Le for his visit.

== The campaign ==
In March 314, Shi Le had readied his soldiers to march deep into You province, but just as he was about to set out, he was worried that his rear would be cut off by the Jin Inspector of Bing province, Liu Kun, the Wuhuan or the Xianbei. After refusing to move his soldiers for several days, Zhang Bin approached Shi Le and told him:

During Pengzu's (Wang Jun's courtesy name) early years in You province, he was heavily dependent on the three tribes, but they have since rebelled and now despise him, so we will not have to deal with them. You is stricken with famine; their people live on vegetables and abandon their families, while their soldiers are too few and weak, meaning there are no troops strong enough within to oppose us. Even if they have a large army waiting in the outskirts, they will surely collapse on their own. General, now that the three forces are not of one mind, you can march a thousand li to invade You. With a light detachment, you can travel back and forth in less than twenty days. Even if the tribes decide to take advantage, our momentum will be enough to turn the tides. Furthermore, though Liu Kun and Wang Jun are both vassals of Jin, they are in fact enemies with one another. If we make peace by sending hostages to Liu Kun, he will be more than happy to accept them and see Wang Jun destroyed. He would never attack us to rescue Wang Jun.

Finally assured, Shi Le ordered his men to march by night with torches. When he reached Bairen (柏人; west of present-day Longyao County, Hebei), he had his Registrar, You Lun (游綸) killed, as he was a brother of You Tong and there were concerns that he would leak the plans to Wang Jun. He also sent an envoy to Liu Kun, explaining the crimes he committed over the years and offering to atone for them by campaigning against Wang Jun. Liu Kun had previously clashed with Wang Jun on a few occasions, and when he received Shi Le's message, he was so delighted that he spread proclamations throughout his territory of his supposed submission.

Eventually, Shi Le reached the Yi River (易水; in present-day Yi County, Hebei) where he was spotted by Wang Jun's general, Sun Wei (孫緯). He reported the situation to Wang Jun and was planning to intercept Shi Le, but he was dissuaded from doing so by You Tong. Many of Wang Jun's generals and officials also began expressing their doubts about Shi Le's sincerity, but he angrily threatened them with beheading if they raised anymore issue before preparing a welcome feast.

On the morning of 3 April, Shi Le arrived at Jicheng and asked the guards to open the city gates. To ensure that there was no ambush, he first sent in thousands of cattle and sheep into the city to block the city streets and alleys for Wang Jun's soldiers while claiming that they were offerings. At this point, Wang Jun began to panic as he alternated between standing and sitting. Once Shi Le entered the city, he ordered his men to ransack the place. Wang Jun's generals urged him for permission to fight back, but he refused. As Shi Le ascended into Wang Jun's Court of Affairs, he fled into his palace but was restrained by Shi Le's soldiers.

== Aftermath ==
=== Death of Wang Jun ===
Following his capture, Wang Jun's wife was summoned and ordered to sit with her husband before Shi Le. Wang Jun accused him of committing treason, to which he responded by accusing him of betraying the Jin and failing to relief his starving subjects despite owning around 500,000 hu of rice. Shi Le then had his general, Wang Luosheng (王洛生), to escort Wang Jun with 500 riders back to Xiangguo. During the trip, Wang Jun managed to escape and attempted to drown himself in a river, but he was pulled out and recaptured. After reaching Xiangguo, Wang Jun was beheaded in the marketplace, and when Shi Le later returned, he sent the head to the Han emperor at Pingyang, Liu Cong.

=== Brief control and loss of You province ===
Shi Le had around ten thousand of Wang Jun's subordinates and elite soldiers executed, including Zao Song, Zhu Shuo and Tan Heng. He also burnt down the palaces and halls, and had the refugees in the area divided up and sent back to their homelands. It was recorded that many of Wang Jun's subordinates rushed to Shi Le's camp to ask for forgiveness and to hand out bribes; only Pei Xian and Xun Chuo (荀綽) showed willingness to die, which impressed Shi Le into recruiting them.

Though he had eliminated a long-time powerful rival in Wang Jun, Shi Le's hold over You province would quickly prove to be tenuous. During his two-day stay at Jicheng, he placed a native of the Yan princely fief, Liu Han (劉翰), in charge of defending the city as the acting Inspector of You province. On his way back to Xiangguo, he barely escaped after he was intercepted and attacked by Sun Wei. With Shi Le away, Liu Han, who secretly despised him, handed the city over Duan Pidi of the Duan, who led a branch of the tribe who remained loyal to the Jin court. Wang Jun's Administrator of Leling, Shao Xu also refused to submit to Shi le from his city of Yanci (厭次, around present-day Dezhou, Shandong).

It would take Shi Le a few more years before he could recapture You province. Nonetheless, Liu Kun and his ally, Tuoba Yilu were dealt a heavy blow as Shi Le now controlled most of Ji province, thereby cutting them off from the rest of their Jin allies. Liu Kun was unsettled when he realized Shi Le's deception, and many of the tribes within Tuoba state of Dai were planning to defect over to Shi Le, forcing Yilu to conduct a great purge that destabilized the state. In the following years, the Dai descended into civil war, and Liu Kun was later drawn out to face Shi Le in a decisive battle in 316.

== Sources ==
- Killigrew, John W. (2013), "The Role of the Moushi 谋士 in the Jin Shu and Wei Shu During the Northern Kingdoms Period, 309–450 AD", Journal of Asian History, 47 (2): 151–96, doi:10.13173/jasiahist.47.2.0151
- Knechtges, David R. (December 2006), "Liu Kun, Lu Chen, and Their Writings in the Transition to the Eastern Jin", Chinese Literature: Essays, Articles, Reviews, 28: 1–66, JSTOR 25478376
- Book of Jin, volume 39, 105
- Zizhi Tongjian, volume 88, 89
