= Conquest of Chouchi by Former Qin =

4th-century military campaign in China

- Part of the Eastern Jin and Sixteen Kingdoms period
Date	March or April – April or May 371
Location	Longnan, Gansu
Result	Qin victory; Fall of Chouchi

Belligerents
Former Qin	Chouchi; Eastern Jin

Commanders and leaders
Fu Ya; Yang An; Wang Tong; Xu Cheng; Zhu Yong; Yao Chang	Yang Cuan (surrendered)

Strength
70,000	50,000 (Chouchi); 1,000 (Jin)

Casualties and losses
Unknown	15,000–20,000

The Conquest of Chouchi by Former Qin, also known as the Conquest of Chouchi by Qin, was a military campaign launched by the Former Qin dynasty against the polity of Chouchi in March or May 371 during the Sixteen Kingdoms period of China. The campaign concluded in the fall of Chouchi, discontinuing the state for fifteen years before its restoration in 385.

== Background ==
Chouchi was a minor Di polity that encompassed parts of modern-day Longnan, Gansu. Despite its small size, the mountainous terrain and their willingness to submit as a vassal prevented them from being subjugated by their larger, more powerful neighbours. However, in 370, the new ruler, Yang Cuan was immediately thrown into a civil war with his uncle, Yang Tong. Cuan had also severed ties with the Former Qin, submitting to the Eastern Jin in the south instead.

That same year, Qin conquered the Former Yan, establishing dominance over northern China in spite of the Former Liang, Dai and Chouchi. Encouraged by his success, the Heavenly King of Qin, Fu Jian, sought to unify the whole of China under his banner.

== The campaign ==
In March or April 371, Fu Jian sent the Marquis of Xi, Fu Ya with his generals, Yang An, Wang Tong, Xu Cheng, Zhu Yong and Yao Chang to lead 70,000 soldiers in invading Chouchi. In April or May, the Qin army reached Jiuxia (鷲峽; in present-day Xihe County, Gansu), and Yang Cuan went out with 50,000 troops to resist. The Jin Inspector of Liang province, Yang Liang, dispatched his officers, Guo Bao (郭寶) and Bu Jing (卜靖) with 1,000 cavalry to support Yang Cuan.

The Qin and Chouchi forces fought at Jiuxia, where Yang Cuan suffered a great defeat. Around 30 to 40 percent of his soldiers were killed in batle, including Guo Bao and Bu Jing, so he gathered his remaining forces and retreated. As the Qin army advanced into Chouchi, Yang Tong brought the people of Wudu to surrender. Yang Tong was frightened, so he bound himself and went out to surrender.

== Aftermath ==
Fu Ya sent Yang Cuan to the Qin capital, Chang'an, while the people of Chouchi were relocated to live in the Guanzhong region, leaving the former Chouchi territory mostly empty. According to the Book of Song, Yang Cuan was later assassinated by Yang An, a member of the Chouchi ruling family; his father Yang Guo ruled as Duke from 355 to 356 before Yang Cuan's grandfather, Yang Jun killed and deposed him. In 385, with the rapid collapse of the Qin following the Battle of Fei River, the state of Chouchi was restored by a distant member of the ruling line, Yang Ding.

== Sources ==
- Book of Song
- Zizhi Tongjian
- Lü, Simian (1948), A History of Jin, Northern and Southern Dynasties 两晋南北朝史, vol. 1, Shanghai: Kaiming Press
- Rogers, Michael C. (1968), "The Chronicle of Fu Chien: A Case of Exemplar History", Chinese Dynastic Histories Translations, no. 10, Berkeley and Los Angeles: University of California Press
