= Third encirclement campaign =

The third encirclement campaign can refer to one of several encirclement campaigns launched during the 1930s by the Nationalist Government of China against the Chinese soviets created by the Chinese Communist Party. These include:

- Third encirclement campaign against the Jiangxi Soviet, July 1 to September 18, 1931
- Third encirclement campaign against the Eyuwan Soviet, November 1931 to June 17, 1932
- Third encirclement campaign against the Hubei-Henan-Shaanxi Soviet
- Third encirclement campaign against the Honghu Soviet, September 1931 to May 30, 1932
- Third encirclement campaign against the Shaanxi-Gansu Soviet, August 1935 to October 25, 1935
