= Conquest of Former Liang by Former Qin =

- Part of the Eastern Jin and Sixteen Kingdoms period
Date	March or April – April or May 371
Location	Gansu
Result	Qin victory; Fall of Liang

Belligerents
Former Qin	Former Liang

Commanders and leaders
Gou Chang; Liang Xi; Mao Sheng; Yao Chang	Zhang Tianxi (surrendered)

Strength
130,000+	100,000+

Casualties and losses
Unknown	38,000+

The Conquest of Former Liang by Former Qin, also known as the Conquest of Liang by Qin, was a military campaign launched by the Former Qin dynasty against the state of Former Liang in September 376 during the Sixteen Kingdoms period of China. The campaign concluded in the fall of Liang, placing modern-day Gansu under Qin control.

== Background ==
The Former Liang was led by the Chinese Zhang clan with a territory roughly encompassing modern-day Gansu. For most of their rule, the Zhang remained vassals to the Eastern Jin dynasty in the south. Due to the distance between their territories, they were one of the last strongholds of the Jin in northern China after the Disaster of Yongjia but were also effectively an independent regime with free rein over their government and people.

When the Former Qin was founded in 351, they competed with the Former Liang state for the Longxi region. As the conflict went on, however, the Liang became entangled in bloody infighting after the death of Zhang Chonghua. They were forced into submission by the Qin, and by the time some semblance of stability was restored by Zhang Tianxi in 363, they were too weak to challenge the Qin, who had firmly established themselves in the northwest. In 367, when Tianxi attempted to seize Longxi from the rebel, Li Yan, he was coaxed into withdrawing when Qin reinforcement arrived, not wanting to face them in battle. The Liang began formally recognizing the Eastern Jin in the south, hoping to launch a joint campaign with the commander, Huan Wen, but nothing came to fruition.

== The campaign ==
=== Fu Jian's ultimatum ===
By 376, the Qin had conquered the Former Yan and Chouchi as well as Yi province from the Jin. As part of his ambition to unify China, the Heavenly King of Qin, Fu Jian, turned to Liang. Despite Zhang Tianxi being a vassal, Fu Jian issued an edict that year declaring that he was acting improperly as a minister and presenting him an ultimatum; to leave his territory for the court at Chang'an, or to face a punitive expedition by the forces of Qin. In preparation, he formed an army of 130,000 strong, placing them under the command of his generals, Gou Chang, Liang Xi, Mao Sheng and Yao Chang among others. He also instructed the Inspector of Qin, Gou Chi, the Inspector of He, Li Bian (李辯) and the Inspector of Liang, Wang Tong to send troops from their provinces as reserves for the main army.

When the edict arrived at Zhang Tianxi's court in Guzang, he held a council to decide his next step. One minister, Xi Le (席仂), suggested that he send his son as a hostage in his place and bribe the envoys to buy more time and come up with a proper plan. However, the rest of the court, aroused by a strong sense of loyalty to the Jin, opposed him and supported going to war, believing that the rough terrain of the Hexi Corridor would tip the balance in their favour. Hearing all of this, Tianxi sided with the majority. The Qin envoys, Yan Fu (閻負) and Liang Shu (梁殊) were threatened with their lives to leave, but they refused. Tianxi angrily had them tied to the gate of the army camp and ordered his soldiers to fire arrows into them. He then sent his general, Ma Jian (馬建), with 20,000 soldiers to anticipate the Qin invasion.

=== March to Guzang ===
In August or September, after news of Yan Fu and Liang Shu's deaths reached Qin, the generals made their moves. Liang Xi, Yao Chang, Wang Tong and Li Bian crossed the Yellow River at Qingshi Crossing (清石津; likely north of present-day Yongjing County, Gansu). They fought the Liang general, Liang Ji (梁濟) at Hehui (河會; west of present-day Lanzhou, Gansu), receiving his surrender. On 16 September, they were joined by Gou Chang from Shicheng Crossing (石城津; also west of Lanzhou). They then marched on to capture Chansuo (纏縮; south of present-day Yongdeng County, Gansu), scaring Ma Jian into retreating from Yangfei (楊非) to Qingsai (清塞; southwest of present-day Wuwei, Gansu).

Zhang Tianxi dispatched his general, Chang Ju with 30,000 soldiers to Hongchi (洪池; in modern-day Wuwei, Gasu) while he advanced with 50,000 troops to Jinchang. One general, Song Hao (宋皓), having considered all the circumstances, concluded that the Liang would not be able to beat Qin and urged Tianxi to surrender, but was rejected and demoted. On 22 September, as Yao Chang led the vanguard with 3,000 armoured soldiers, Ma Jian surrendered with 10,000 of his men while the rest scattered and fled. On 23 September, Gou Chang fought and greatly routed Chang Ju at Hongchi. During the battle, Chang Ju's horse was killed. He denied an offer to save himself with another horse, instead choosing to stay behind and commit suicide with his sword.

On 25 September, the Qin army arrived at Qingsai. Tianxi sent his general, Zhao Chongzhe (趙充哲) to resist them, but he was greatly routed and died at Chi'an (赤岸; northeast of Jinchang), with 38,000 of his men either captured or killed. He then went out to give battle himself, but when a rebellion broke out in Guzang, he withdrew back to the city with a few thousand riders. In the end, the Qin army arrived on 26 September. Offering surrender, Tianxi went out tied in chains to a coffin on a horse-drawn cart, and in acceptance, Gou Chang removed the chains and burnt the coffin. The rest of Liang's territory soon surrendered as well.

== Aftermath ==
Zhang Tianxi was sent to the Chang'an, where he was allowed to live in a mansion and serve as a mid-ranking official, while Liang Xi replaced him in his command over Liang as the provincial inspector. With control over the Hexi Corridor, the Former Qin gained access to the Western Regions and received tributes from the various oasis states that reside there. Just three months later, Qin would also conquer the Dai, thus completing their unification of northern China.

== Sources ==
- Rogers, Michael C. (1968), "The Chronicle of Fu Chien: A Case of Exemplar History", Chinese Dynastic Histories Translations, no. 10, Berkeley and Los Angeles: University of California Press, pp. 125–141
- Spring and Autumn Annals of the Sixteen Kingdoms
- Zizhi Tongjian
