= Former Qin invasion of Sichuan =

- Part of the Eastern Jin and Sixteen Kingdoms period
Date	Winter 373
Location	Hanzhong and Sichuan
Result	Qin victory; Qin takes control of Hanzhong and Sichuan

Belligerents
Former Qin	Eastern Jin

Commanders and leaders
Yang An; Wang Tong; Xu Cheng; Zhu Yong; Mao Dang	Yang Liang; Huan Huo

Strength
50,000	10,000+ (Yang Liang)

Casualties and losses
Unknown	Unknown

The Former Qin invasion of Sichuan was a campaign launched by the state of Former Qin against the Eastern Jin dynasty in winter 373 during the Sixteen Kingdoms period. The campaign concluded in victory for the Qin, adding the provinces of Yi and Liang to their empire.

== Background ==
Since conquering the state of Cheng-Han in 347, the provinces of Yi and Liang, which roughly encompassed modern-day Sichuan and Hanzhong, was under the control of the Eastern Jin dynasty. Within Liang lies the Qin Mountains, which acts as a natural border between the Jin and the Di-led Former Qin dynasty in the northwestern region of Guanzhong. The Qin conquered their rival, the Former Yan and established their dominance in northern China in 370. Encouraged by their success, the Heavenly King of Qin, Fu Jian embarked on a venture to unify all of China. He initially expanded west by conquering the minor polity of Chouchi in 371, but in 373, perhaps influenced by the recent death of the powerful Jin commander, Huan Wen, he set his sights on conquering Yi and Liang provinces.

== The campaign ==
In the winter of 373, Fu Jian began his invasion of Liang and Yi provinces. He sent Wang Tong and Zhu Yong to lead 20,000 troops towards Hanzhong while dispatching Mao Dang and Xu Cheng with 30,000 soldiers towrds Jianmen. The Jin Inspector of Liang, Yang Liang, recruited more than 10,000 people from the Ba and Lao tribes to resist the invasion, but he was badly defeated at Qing Valley (青谷; northeast of Yang County, Shaanxi), forcing him to fall back to Xicheng (西城; believed to be located 120 li southwest of present-day Tianshui, Gansu). Zhu Yong and Xu Cheng thus captured Hanzhong and Jianmen.

The Qin general, Yang An then attacked Zitong Commandery. The local Jin administrator, Zhou Xiao, fiercely held on to Fucheng and sent several thousand soldiers to bring his mother and wife along the Han River to Jiangling. However, Zhu Yong's soldiers intercepted and captured them, prompting Zhou Xiao to surrender. In November or December, Yang An conquered Zitong.

The Jin Inspector of Jing province, Huan Huo sent the Chancellor of Jiangxia, Zhu Yao to reinforce the two provinces, but when Zhu Yao learnt that the Administrator of Guanghan Commandery was killed in battle, he retreated with his army. The Jin Inspector of Yi, Zhou Zhongsun (周仲孫), brought his soldiers to fight Zhu Yong at Mianzhu, but when he heard that Qin reinforcements led by Mao Dang was arriving at Chengdu, he and 5,000 riders fled to Nanzhong. With the fall of Chengdu, the rest of Yi and Liang provinces surrendered to Qin.

== Aftermath ==
=== Zhang Yu and Yang Guang's rebellion ===
Fu Jian consolidated his newly attained territory by appointing Yang An as the Governor of Yi, Mao Dang as the Inspector of Liang and Yao Chang as the Inspector of Ning. His hold over theses provinces were tenuous at first; in May or June 374, two natives of Shu, Zhang Yu (張育) and Yang Guang (楊光), rebelled and attacked the local Qin forces with 20,000 followers. They requested aid from the Jin, who sent their Inspector of Yi, Zhu Yao and the general, Huan Shiqian with 30,000 soldiers. The Jin reinforcements arrived at Dianjiang, where they defeated Yao Chang and drove him back to Wucheng (五城, around present-day Guanghan, Sichuan).

As the Jin army set camp at Badong (巴東; around present-day Fengjie County, Chongqing), however, Zhang Yu claimed the title of King of Shu and later declared a new reign era, Heilong (黑龍). He rallied the chieftains of the Ba and Lao tribes to besiege Yang An at Chengdu with 50,000 soldiers. All the while, Fu Jian had sent his general, Deng Qiang with 50,000 infantry to crush the rebels. In July or June, Zhang Yu quarreled with his subordinates and soon started attacking each other. Then, Deng Qiang and Yang An appeared and routed, forcing Zhang Yu to flee Mianzhu with Yang Guang. The following month, Deng Qiang defeated the Jin reinforcements to the west of Fu. In August or September, Yang An routed the Ba and Lao rebels south of Chengdu, killing 23,000 of them including one of their chieftains. Deng Qiang also attacked Mianzhu and beheaded both Zhang Yu and Yang Guang, restoring order to the southwest.

With the end of Zhang Yu and Yang Guang's rebellion, the southwest remained under Qin control for the next decade and opened a new front for them to invade the Jin. During the Qin collapse that followed the disastrous Battle of Fei River, Jin forces would recover the entirety of Yi and Liang provinces in 385.

== Sources ==
- Lü, Simian (1948), A History of Jin, Northern and Southern Dynasties 两晋南北朝史, vol. 1, Shanghai: Kaiming Press
- Rogers, Michael C. (1968), "The Chronicle of Fu Chien: A Case of Exemplar History", Chinese Dynastic Histories Translations, no. 10, Berkeley and Los Angeles: University of California Press
- Book of Jin
- Zizhi Tongjian
