= Second encirclement campaign =

The second encirclement campaign can refer to one of several encirclement campaigns launched during the 1930s by the Nationalist Government of China against the Chinese soviets created by the Chinese Communist Party. These include:

- Second encirclement campaign against the Jiangxi Soviet, April 1, 1931 to May 31, 1931
- Second encirclement campaign against the Eyuwan Soviet, April 1931 to July 1931
- Second encirclement campaign against the Honghu Soviet, March 1, 1931, to early June, 1931
- Second encirclement campaign against the Hubei-Henan-Shaanxi Soviet, February 1935 to April 18, 1935
- Second encirclement campaign against the Shaanxi-Gansu Soviet, April 1935 to July, 1935
