= Nanmian =

Nanmian (南面) is the name for the southward orientation of thrones or seats of power in traditional Chinese culture.

Emperors, empresses, high-ranking officials and other important persons in Chinese history would traditionally sit on seats that were located at the north and facing south. This position was considered the seat of honour in a hall.

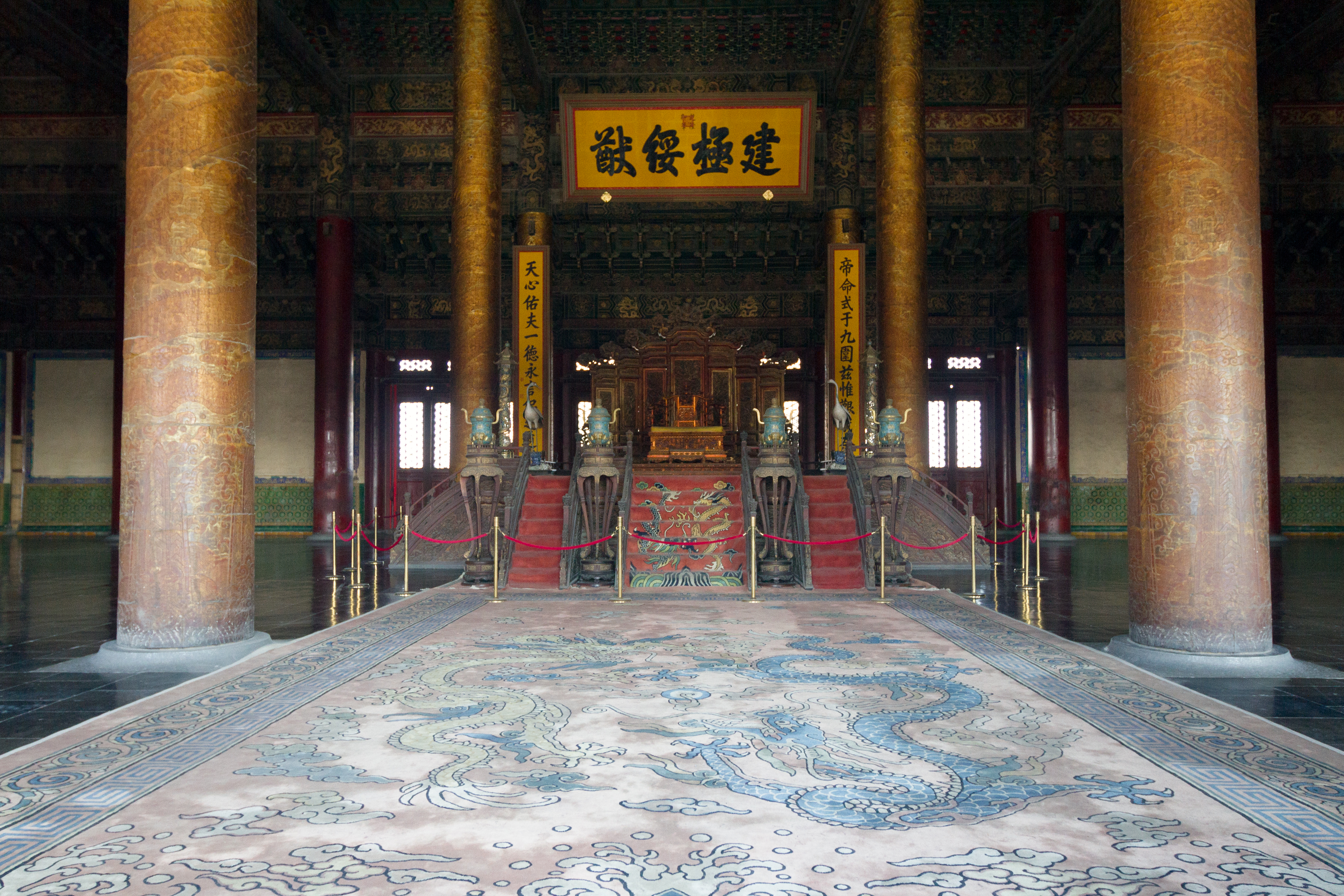
The imperial throne in the Hall of Supreme Harmony in the Forbidden City facing to the south

== Usage ==
In the Analects, Confucius comments that his disciple Ran You was worthy to sit in the nanmian (i.e. that he was worthy to sit in the place of a prince). The implication was that even though Ran You was a disciple and not a prince, Confucius considered his virtue to make him worthy of such a high position.

Zhu Xi a scholar of the Song dynasty, in his commentary on the Analects wrote "the one sitting at the nanmian, is in the place of the prince to listen and rule, for Chong Gong (Ran You) was magnanimous, wise, simple to the people and modest, he was at the level of a prince" (南面者，人君听治之位，言仲弓宽洪简重，有人君之度也)

In the I Ching it is written "the nanmian hears the world, toward the light rules" (南面而听天下，向明而治). The meaning is interpreted that since south is the direction of the Sun (in China and the northern hemisphere), the ruler faces towards the light as he rules, with the light representing wisdom or virtue.
