= Battle of Jinyang (312) =

Battle involving the Western Jin and Dai against the Han-Zhao (312)

- Part of Upheaval of the Five Barbarians
Date	August – December 312
Location	Taiyuan, Shanxi
Result	Jin and Dai victory

Belligerents
Han-Zhao	Western Jin; Dai

Commanders and leaders
Liu Can; Liu Yao; Liu Yi; Liu Feng	Liu Kun; Tuoba Yilu

Strength
Unknown	+60,000 (Dai)

Casualties and losses
Heavy	Unknown

The Battle of Jinyang was fought between the state of Han-Zhao and the allied forces of the Western Jin and Tuoba Dai from roughly August to December 312. The battle concluded in victory for the alliance.

== Prelude ==
=== First attack on Jinyang ===
On 12 February 312, the Han-Zhao emperor, Liu Cong sent his general, Jin Chong (靳沖) to invade Liu Kun's territory in Bing province while another general, Bo Ku (卜珝), acted as reserves. Jin Chong's forces reached Liu Kun's capital at Jinyang and laid siege to the city for three months. On 6 May, Liu Kun's ally, the supreme chief of the Tuoba tribe and the Duke of Dai, Tuoba Yilu, sent his army to help lift the siege, defeating the Han invaders and turning them back.

=== Linghu Ni's defection ===
In the months following his victory, Liu Kun had his nephew, Liu Yan occupy the abandoned city of Ye and set a date for the tenth month (October or November) to launch a campaign against the Han capital at Pingyang. However, at the same time, he also appointed a native of Hedong Commandery named Xu Run (徐潤) as his Prefect of Jinyang. Xu Run attained the position by impressing Liu Kun with his musical talents, but in his administration, he was arbitrary and without restraint.

Liu Kun's Army Protector, Linghu Sheng (令狐盛) would often argue with Xu Run for his behaviour and even advised Liu Kun to kill him, but was ignored. When Xu Run heard about the complaints, he began slandering Linghu Sheng to Liu Kun on several occasions. Eventually, Liu Kun ordered Linghu Sheng executed, causing his son, Linghu Ni (令狐泥), to defect to Han and reveal to them about Liu Kun's situation, much to the delight of Liu Cong.

== The battle ==
=== Capture of Jinyang ===
In August 312, Liu Cong sent his sons, Liu Can and Liu Yi (劉易), along with his cousin, Liu Yao to invade Liu Kun's territory again, this time with Linghu Ni as their guide. Coincidentally, the Jin Administrator of Shangdang, Xi Chun (襲醇) surrendered to Han while the Wuhuan tribes of Yanmen Commandery rebelled against Jin. Liu Kun had to personally lead his elite soldiers out to campaign against the rebels, first marching east to gather more troops at Changshan and Zhongshan commanderies. Meanwhile, he sent his generals, Hao Shen (郝詵) and Zhang Qiao (張喬) to deal with Liu Can and also requested assistance from Tuoba Yilu.

Hao Shen and Zhang Qiao fought the Han at Wuguan (武灌; southwest of present-day Yuci District, Shanxi), but were defeated and killed. The rest of Liu Kun's defenses were too weak to pose a threat, so Liu Can and Liu Yao capitalized by heading straight to Jinyang. The people of Jinyang were shaken by the success of the invaders, and soon, the Administrator of Taiyuan, Gao Qiao (高喬) and the Attendant Officer, Hao Yu (郝聿) surrendered the city to Han.

On 18 September, Liu Kun finally returned to save Jinyang, but was unsuccessful, so he brought with him his wife and children along with several of his personal riders to flee to Tingtou (亭頭; around modern Shijiazhuang, Hebei) in Zhao Commandery before travelling to Changshan. Liu Can and Liu Yao entered Jinyang on 19 September, and Linghu Ni had Liu Kun's parents killed the next day. Liu Yao was re-appointed Grand General of Chariots and Cavalry while another general, Liu Feng (劉豐), was appointed Inspector of Bing province. Both of them were garrisoned at Jinyang to guard the city.

=== Tuoba Yilu's counterattack ===
Soon, Liu Kun went to Tuoba Yilu himself to tell him of his defeat and asked him for help. In October or November, Tuoba Yilu placed his son, Tuoba Liuxiu, his nephew, Tuoba Pugen and his generals, Wei Xiong (衞雄), Ji Dan (箕澹) and Fan Ban (范班) in command of the vanguard army of several tens of thousands strong to capture Jinyang while he himself led 60,000 soldiers to Langmeng (狼猛; location unknown) to act as reserves. Liu Kun also regathered his scattered troops and acted as a guide for the Tuoba.

Tuoba Liuxiu's forces fought and defeated Liu Yao east of the Fen River. During the fighting, Liu Yao's horse fell and he was pierced by seven arrows, but his general, Fu Hu (傅虎), saved his life by giving up his own horse to him. Fu Hu stayed behind and was killed in battle as Liu Yao crossed the Fen River and escaped back to Jinyang. On the night of his return, Liu Can and Liu Yi ordered their soldiers to burn their own supply trains and sack the city. They then broke through the enemy encirclement and fled through Mount Meng (蒙山; in modern-day Taiyuan, Shanxi) towards Pingyang.

In November or December, Tuoba Yilu chased after the retreating Han forces, eventually catching them at Lan Valley (藍谷; southwest of modern-day Taiyuan, Shanxi). The Tuoba greatly routed them, killing and capturing many of their generals and soldiers including Liu Feng while Liu Can, Liu Yi and Liu Yao made it back to Han territory.

== Aftermath ==
After his victory, Tuoba Yilu hosted a grand hunt at Mount Shouyang (壽陽山; in present-day Shouyang County, Shanxi). Liu Kun soon entered his camp and performed obeisance to express his gratitude while also asking Yilu to continue his advance against Han. Yilu decided against continuing his campaign, as he had already recovered most of Liu Kun's territory and his soldiers were exhausted from travelling a long way, but he gifted Liu Kun with more than a thousand livestock and a hundred carriages before returning to Dai. He also left his generals, Ji Dan, Duan Fan (段繁) and others to guard Jinyang with elite troops. Though Liu Kun had recovered Jinyang, he opted to move his capital north to Yangqu, where he regrouped his remaining scattered troops.

== Sources ==
- Holmgren, Jennifer (1982), Annals of Tai : early T'o-pa history according to the first chapter of the Wei-shu, Faculty of Asian Studies in association with Australian National University Press
- Knechtges, David R. (December 2006), "Liu Kun, Lu Chen, and Their Writings in the Transition to the Eastern Jin", Chinese Literature: Essays, Articles, Reviews, vol. 28, JSTOR, pp. 1–66
- Book of Jin
- Zizhi Tongjian
