= Battle of Fakashan =

1981 conflict between China and Vietnam

- Part of the Sino-Vietnamese conflicts (1979–1991)
Date	5 May – 7 June 1981 (1 month and 2 days)
Location	Fakashan on the China–Vietnam border near Guangxi and Lạng Sơn
Result	Chinese victory
Territorial changes	China gains control of Fakashan

Belligerents
China	Vietnam

Units involved
3rd Border Defense Division: 9th Regiment	337th Division: 52nd Regiment

Casualties and losses
Several Hundred	731 killed; 556 wounded

The Battle of Fakashan (Chinese: 法卡山戰役), also known as the Battle of Hill 400, was fought in 1981 between China and Vietnam as part of the Sino-Vietnamese conflicts (1979–1991).

== Background ==
=== Border conflicts ===
After the Sino-Vietnamese War of 1979, fighting still continued between China and Vietnam although the scale of engagements was significantly smaller.

From 1980 to 1983, the People's Liberation Army (PLA) took military action against the position occupied by the People's Army of Vietnam (PAVN) along the border.

China accused Vietnam of conducting cross-border raids against Chinese positions in the Luojiaping area, Maguan County, Yunnan, on 30 September and 1 October, in which 3 Chinese border guards or militiamen were killed. The Chinese launched a retaliatory assault against Vietnamese positions in the same area on 15 October, in which they killed 42 Vietnamese troops and captured 3.

On 9 November, the PLA attacked Ma'anshan (Hill 1175.4), which, at its foot, had a highway connecting Malipo County and Thanh Thủy, a broder town.

=== Fakashan ===
Fakashan (法卡山), also known as Hill 400 to the Vietnamese, is a mountainous range on the China–Vietnam border. It is between Pingxiang, Guangxi, and the Cao Lộc district, Lạng Sơn province. It consists of five peaks, with the third being the tallest with a height of 511.3 m above sea level.

On 2 January 1981, the Vietnamese Ministry of Foreign Affairs proposed a ceasefire during the Lunar New Year festival. That proposal was rejected by China on 20 January, but both sides continued the exchange of prisoners-of-war. The situation was relatively calm for the next few months.

In light of China's decision to maintain military pressure on Vietnam, PLA forces in Guangxi selected Fakashan for an attack. Fakashan was under the control of the 337th Division of the PAVN. The initial attack was planned for New Year's Day in 1981 but was postponed to early May because of mountain floods in the region. It is also speculated that since it was the first major operation since 1979, the PLA military leadership believed that more preparation was needed since it was transitioning from a military approach involving human wave attacks to a modern one, involving a smaller but well-trained group of soldiers that could perform surprise attacks.

== Battle ==
The assault on Fakashan began on 5 May 1981. To justify this military operation, China announced that the attack was in response to acts of aggression by Vietnam during the first quarter of that year.

Artillery barrages were used before the attack. One PLA company captured Vietnamese positions on Fakashan, killing 26 PAVN soldiers and wounding 43.

However, starting on 10 May, the PAVN launched a series of counterattacks with the intention of recapturing Fakashan. Although the conflict raged on, China did not want to escalate and deployed only border guard units, instead of regular troops, into the battles. The PAVN staged human wave counterattacks, with groups of troops ranging from company to battalion-sized. Artillery fire also played a significant role in these counterattacks. More than 20,000 rockets and artillery shells were lobbed at the hilltops of Fakashan. The most intense battles were fought on 10, 16, and 19 May and 7 June. The PLA defenders managed to repulse the Vietnamese assaults with claims of inflicting 1,218 casualties (705 dead and 513 wounded) on the PAVN forces.

After the last Vietnamese counterattack, both sides continued to exchange artillery fire until the end of the month. The PLA unit later received the honorific title "Fakashan Hero Battalion."

== Aftermath ==
Western observers have linked China's military action on the border in response to the Cambodian–Vietnamese War, but others believe that it was not a true response to the Cambodian situation.

The PAVN continued to shell Fakashan until 1991, when relations between China and Vietnam normalized. No other significant military actions were taken.

== Sources ==
- Zhang, Xiaoming (6 May 2015). Deng Xiaoping's Long War: The Military Conflict between China and Vietnam, 1979–1991. UNC Press Books. ISBN 978-1-4696-2125-8.
- O'Dowd, Edward C. (16 April 2007). Chinese Military Strategy in the Third Indochina War: The Last Maoist War. Routledge. ISBN 978-1-134-12267-7.
