= Sui–Turkic war =

581–602 war between the Sui Dynasty and the Turks

Sui–Turkic War
Date	581–602
Location	Northern China
Result	Turkic victory
Territorial changes	Split of The First Turkic Khaganate Sui armies defeated many times,The north of China was plundered,Ishbara Khan retreated because of Tardu's betrayal

Belligerents
Sui dynasty	First Turkic Khaganate

Commanders and leaders
Emperor Wen of Sui	Shaboluo Khan; Apa Qaghan; Ishbara Qaghan; Tulan Qaghan; Tardu

The Sui–Turkic war was fought between the Sui dynasty and the First Turkic Khaganate.

Turkic army crossed the Great Wall. Chinese General Li Kuang defeated in Ma-i by Turks. Chinese General Li Yen retreated without engaging in a conflict. After, Turks entered Lan province and defeat Ho-lu Tsu-kan who governor of the Liang state. Advancing from two locations, Mu-hsia and Shih-men, the Turks invaded Wu-wcei, T'ien-shui, An-ting, Chin-ch'eng, Shang-chün, Hun-hua, and Yen-an, seizing all the livestock. They then carried out extensive looting. Deeply saddened and bewildered by these defeats, the Sui emperor issued a long edict to boost the morale of her war-stricken and exhausted army.

In Chou-p'an, the army of Ta-hsi Chang-ju, tasked with stopping the Gokturks, retreated out of fear of battle upon seeing the 100,000-strong Turkic army. After the Chinese army under Ta-hsi Changju dispersed, the Turks departed to plunder the provinces of Lung and Chi'n. Having thus conquered seven regions of China, Ishbara Khagan wanted to advance further south, but upon hearing of Tardu Khagan's betrayal and the Töles rebellion in the north, he was forced to retreat. Therefore, the plunder was limited to the northern borders of the Sui Empire.

The war lasted 21 years, from the invasion of the First Turkic Khaganate in 581 to the surrender of the Eastern Turkic Khaganate in 602. After the war, the situation became even more tense. Due to internal instability, the Eastern and Western Khans abandoned the Sui dynasty in 607 and 611 respectively. As the Sui dynasty gained a great advantage in this war, it was able to launch the war to destroy the Chen dynasty and unify China.

The Sui dynasty sent troops to defend the border and took the initiative to counterattack, and finally adopted Changsun Sheng's policy of "making friends with distant countries and attacking nearby countries, separating the strong and uniting the weak" to divide and alienate the various Turkic tribes. The Turks fought without strategic policies such as plundering materials and waging wars, and the Khans couldn't unite closely and finally collapsed. The victory of the Sui dynasty against the Turks was conducive to protecting the economy and culture of the Central Plains.

== See also ==
- Book of Sui
- Zizhi Tongjian, vols. 175
