= First encirclement campaign =

The first encirclement campaign can refer to one of several encirclement campaigns launched during the 1930s by the Nationalist Government of China against the Chinese soviets created by the Chinese Communist Party. These include:

- First encirclement campaign against the Jiangxi Soviet, November 1930 to January 3, 1931
- First encirclement campaign against the Eyuwan Soviet, November 1930 to March 9, 1931
- First encirclement campaign against the Hunan-Hubei-Jiangxi Soviet, December 1930 to May 1931
- First encirclement campaign against the Honghu Soviet, early December 1930 to the end of January 1931
- First encirclement campaign against the Hubei–Henan–Shaanxi Soviet, January to February 5, 1935
- First encirclement campaign against the Shaanxi–Gansu Soviet, March 1934 to August 26, 1934
