= Battle of Kitai =

- Part of the Kumul Rebellion
Date	Late May 1934
Location	Qitai County, Xinjiang
Result	Chinese victory
Territorial changes	Capture of Qitai by the New 36th Division

Belligerents
(Taiwan) Republic of China: (Taiwan) New 36th Division	Chinese Xinjiang Provincial government White movement

Commanders and leaders
(Taiwan) Ma Chung-chieh †	Sheng Shicai

Strength
Unknown Chinese Muslim troops	4,000 Provincial Forces and 1,000 Russian forces

Casualties and losses
1,000 killed or wounded	Heavy

The Battle of Kitai (Chinese: 奇台县之战) was a confrontation that took place during the Xinjiang Wars. In May 1934 Ma Chung-chieh led the New 36th Division an attack on Qitai County against Xinjiang clique forces and managed to win the battle.

According to Wu:

losses during the capture of Kitai were 1,000 killed or wounded. Ma Chung-chieh was reportedly killed in a moment of "inspired but utterly reckless bravery" when attempting to scale the walls in the face of machine-gun fire.

There would appear to be no substance in the claims made by the JRCAS that Ma's troops were largely unarmed before their attack on Kitai, or that they were subsequently defeated by provincial forces to the west of Kitai on 29 May
