= Fifth encirclement campaign =

The fifth encirclement campaign can refer to one of two encirclement campaigns launched during the 1930s by the Nationalist Government of China against the Chinese soviets created by the Chinese Communist Party.

- The fifth encirclement campaign against the Jiangxi Soviet, September 1933 to October 1934
- The fifth encirclement campaign against the Eyuwan Soviet, July 1933 to November 1934
