= Xi Zhongxun =

Chinese politician (1913–2002)

- 习仲勋
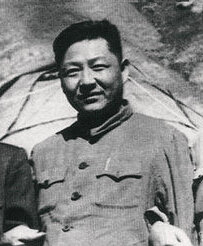
- Xi in 1952

Vice Chairperson of the Standing Committee of the National People's Congress
- In office September 10, 1980 – February 25, 1983
- Chairman: Ye Jianying
- In office April 27, 1988 – March 27, 1993
- Chairman: Wan Li

Party Secretary of Guangdong
- In office November 1978 – November 1980
- Preceded by: Wei Guoqing
- Succeeded by: Ren Zhongyi

Governor of Guangdong
- In office January 1979 – February 1981
- Preceded by: Wei Guoqing (as Director of the Guangdong Provincial Revolutionary Committee)
- Succeeded by: Liu Tianfu

1st Secretary-General of the State Council
- In office September 1954 – January 1965
- Premier: Zhou Enlai
- Succeeded by: Zhou Rongxin

16th Vice Premier of China
- In office April 1959 – January 1965
- Premier: Zhou Enlai

Head of the Publicity Department of the Chinese Communist Party
- In office January 1953 – July 1954
- Party Chairman: Mao Zedong
- Preceded by: Lu Dingyi
- Succeeded by: Lu Dingyi

Personal details
- Born: 15 October 1913 Fuping County, Shaanxi, Republic of China
- Died: 24 May 2002 (aged 88) Beijing, China
- Party: Chinese Communist Party (joined in 1928)
- Spouse(s): Hao Mingzhu (m. 1936; div. 1944) Qi Xin (m. 1944)
- Children: 7, including Qi Qiaoqiao, Xi Jinping and Xi Yuanping
- Relatives: Xi family

Military service
- Branch/service: Chinese Red Army
- Unit: Guominjun
- Commands: Chinese Red Army; First Field Army
- Battles/wars: Chinese Civil War; Liangdang Uprising; Battle of Xihuachi; World War II

Chinese name
- Simplified Chinese: 习仲勋
- Traditional Chinese: 習仲勲
Transcriptions
Standard Mandarin
- Hanyu Pinyin: Xí Zhòngxūn
- Wade–Giles: Hsi Chung-hsün
Yue: Cantonese
- Jyutping: Zaap6 Zung6-fan1

Xi Zhongxun (Chinese: 习仲勋; pinyin: Xí Zhòngxūn; 15 October 1913 – 24 May 2002) was a Chinese Communist politician. He was the father of Chinese President Xi Jinping.

Born in Shaanxi to a land-owning family, Xi joined the Communist Youth League of China in 1926. After participating in revolutionary activities, he was sent to prison, where he joined the Chinese Communist Party (CCP). He participated in the Shaanxi–Gansu (Shaangan) Border Region Soviet Area and became the Chairman of the Soviet Government, later holding positions in the Northwest Revolutionary Base. In 1935, Xi was arrested as part of a purge of alleged rightists, but was released following Mao Zedong's arrival in the Long March. During the Second Sino-Japanese War, Xi Zhongxun assumed a number of duties in the Shaanxi-Gansu-Ningxia Border Region and Northwest China. In 1945, he became the head of the Northwest Bureau. Following the restart of the Chinese Civil War, Xi consolidated his position in the Northwest region.

After the establishment of the People's Republic of China, Xi was designated as a member of the Central People's Government and the Second Secretary of the CCP Northwest Bureau, managing all significant party, government, and military matters in the Northwest region. He served as the first Secretary-General of the State Council from 1954 to 1965 and 16th Vice Premier of the State Council from 1959 to 1965. Li Jiantong's novel Liu Zhidan led to his political downfall, and he was persecuted during the Cultural Revolution. He was politically cleared in 1978, being appointed to afterwards Guangdong, becoming its Party Secretary from 1978 to 1980. In there, Xi pioneered China's first special economic zones and was instrumental in the creation of Shenzhen. He served as the Vice Chairman of the Standing Committee of the National People's Congress from 1980 to 1983, overseeing legal reforms. In 1982, he became a Secretariat Member, where he often focused on ethnic minority policies and religion policies. He again served as the NPCSC Vice Chairman from 1988 to 1993, afterwards retiring in Guangdong. He returned to Beijing in 2002 where he died. He was a member of the influential Eight Elders, and is the father of Xi Jinping, the general secretary of the Chinese Communist Party since 2012.

== Early life and education ==
Xi was born on 15 October 1913, to a land-owning family, in rural Fuping County, Shaanxi. His parents were Xi Zongde (Chinese: 习宗德) and Chai Caihua (Chinese: 柴菜花). His grandparents, Xi Yongsheng and a woman with the surname Zhang, had come to Shaanxi after fleeing economic hardship in Dengzhou, Henan; Xi Zhongxun considered himself to be Henanese. Xi's childhood name was Xiangjin, which according to Xi Jinping's recounting of family history, was drawn from the Three Character Classic to have the meaning "to become closer through practice".

Xi started working in the fields at age five. In 1922, Xi enrolled in primary school, where he studied traditional Confucian texts, arithmetic, society, and the natural world. In February 1926, he enrolled in the Licheng Middle School. In March 1926, Xi joined the Licheng Youth Society, which was founded by communists. In school, a travelling Chinese Communist Party (CCP) member came to the school to teach about Marxism, marking Xi's first understanding of communism. Xi joined the Communist Youth League of China in May 1926. In June, he joined his teacher Yan Musan to protest a local militia leader named Zhang. In January 1927, he studied at the Fuping County First Higher Primary School, brought by Yan. His first application to join the CCP was rejected due to his young age. At the end of the year, he was forced to suspend his studies for organizing students to oppose the traditional old-style education system. In January 1928, he enrolled at the Third Normal School (Chinese: 三原省立第三师范) in Sanyuan County under the guidance of Yan. There, Xi participated in student movements as well as in activities off campus.

During the White Terror in Shaanxi, the Nationalists engaged in mass arrests of Communists and students, and executed members of the Communist Youth League. After initial unsuccessful efforts at leading peasant revolts in response, the Communist Party branch in Shaanxi launched what became the Weihua Uprising in March 1928. Xi was among the students and Communists in Sanyuan County who mobilised in support. Xi and two of his fellow students were recruited to assassinate the head of instruction at Third Normal School. They failed and were arrested. In prison, Xi joined the Chinese Communist Party. He participated in a hunger strike to win better food for inmates and did political work to build relations with Nationalist deserters who were imprisoned. Through the intervention of Song Zheyuan, the then Chairman of the Shaanxi Provincial Government under the Kuomintang, Xi Zhongxun and his colleagues were acquitted and released.

Shortly after Xi Zhongxun was released from prison, his father died. Xi's mother and two sisters were in poor health due to famine and died shortly thereafter. After their death, Xi worked to care for his family, which by that time had ten people.

== Early career ==
=== Red Army period ===
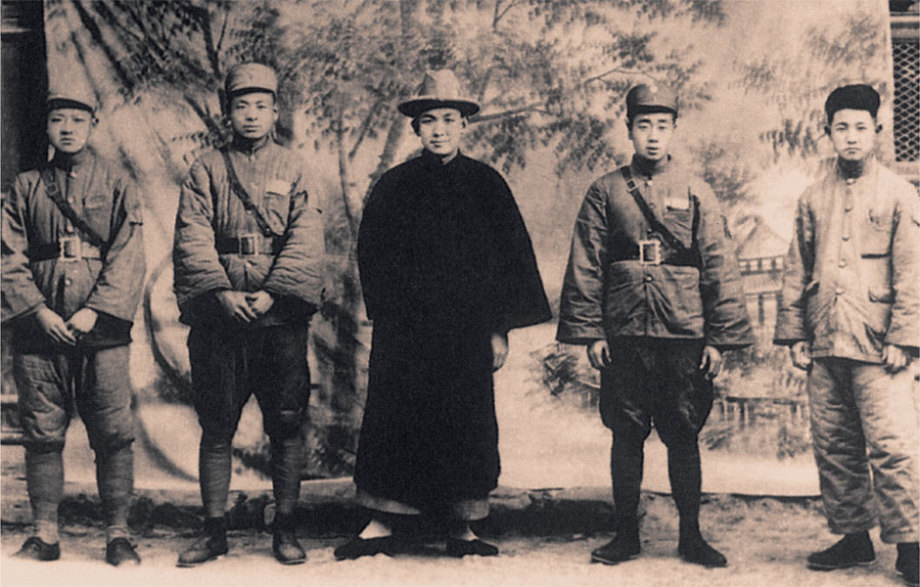
Xi Zhongxun, Liu Shulin, Zhang Qiuchen, Yan Hongzhang, and Liu Shangzhi taken on the eve of the Liangdang Uprising.

In 1930, Xi was appointed by the party to work in the Guominjun under Yang Hucheng. In March 1932, Xi Zhongxun, together with Lü Jianren, Li Tesheng, Xu Tianjie, and others, orchestrated the Liangdang Uprising, holding the position of Party Committee Secretary for the Fifth Detachment of the Shaanxi-Gansu Guerrilla Force of the Chinese Workers' and Peasants' Red Army. The army was subsequently disbanded during an assault on Yongshou County, and Xi Zhongxun clandestinely returned to his native place. In September 1932, he joined the Weibei Revolutionary Base Area and assumed the role of political instructor for the Second Detachment of the Weibei Guerrilla Force.

In March 1933, he joined Liu Zhidan and others in founding the Shaanxi–Gansu (Shaangan) Border Region Soviet Area, and became the chairman of the Soviet area government while leading guerillas in resisting Nationalist incursions and expanding the Soviet area. He consecutively occupied roles as a Member of the Special Committee of the CPC Shaanxi-Gansu Border Region, Secretary of the Military Commission and the Youth League Special Committee, Political Commissar of the Guerrilla Headquarters, and Vice Chairman and Chairman of the Revolutionary Committee. In November 1934, Xi Zhongxun was chosen Chairman of the Soviet Government of the Shaanxi-Gansu Border Region. Working with Liu was influential on Xi, who in 1979 described Liu as having taught him that "revolution demands a united line" and the importance of listening to differing voices, including those outside the Communist Party.

In February 1935, the revolutionary base regions in Northern Shaanxi and the Shaanxi-Gansu border region were consolidated during the Second Counter-Encirclement Campaign, resulting in the formation of the Northwest Revolutionary Base. Xi Zhongxun emerged as a prominent figure within the Northwest Working Committee of the Chinese Communist Party and maintained his role as Chairman of the Soviet Government of the Shaanxi-Gansu Border Region.

In September 1935, Xi Zhongxun, together with Liu Jingfan and others, went to Wazichuan in Bao’an County to welcome the 25th Red Army upon its arrival in northern Shaanxi after the Long March. Shortly thereafter, Xi was arrested as part of a purge of alleged rightists. In October, after CCP Chairman Mao Zedong arrived in northern Shaanxi, Xi was released and politically rehabilitated. Xi attributed Mao's arrival to saving Xi's life. It is said that Xi's "Revolutionary Base Area of the Northwest saved the Party Center and the Party Center saved the revolutionaries of the Northwest." The base area eventually became the Yan'an Soviet, the headquarters of the Chinese Communist movement until 1947.

In January 1936, Xi Zhongxun was designated as Vice Chairman of the Soviet Government of the Central Shaanxi Special District and Secretary of the Party Group. Subsequent to the Northeastern Army's occupation of the Central Shaanxi region in April, he assumed the role of Secretary of the CCP Central Shaanxi Working Committee, persistently directing the efforts of the battle. In June 1936, Xi participated in the Red Army's westward campaign, subsequently holding the positions of Secretary of the CCP Quhuan Working Committee and Secretary of the Huan County Committee. In September, he was once more assigned to Central Shaanxi by the Central Committee of the CCP, where he held the positions of Secretary of the Central Shaanxi Special Committee, Political Commissar of the Central Shaanxi Guerrilla Force, and Political Commissar of the Central Shaanxi Special District Command.

=== Second Sino-Japanese War ===
During the Second Sino-Japanese War, Xi Zhongxun assumed a number of duties in the Shaanxi-Gansu-Ningxia Border Region and Northwest China. In October 1937, he was designated Secretary of the CCP Guanzhong Subcommittee while simultaneously holding the position of Political Commissar of the local Security Command. In May 1939, he was appointed Commissioner of the Guanzhong Special Administrative Office. In 1940, he took on the position of Principal at the Second Normal School in the border area and became a member of the CCP Central Bureau for Shaanxi-Gansu-Ningxia.

Beginning in 1941, Xi held the position of Political Commissar for both the Guanzhong Military Subdistrict and the First Security Brigade, directing the Eighth Route Army in countering aggressions by Nationalist forces. In August 1942, he was appointed President of the Party School of the CCP Northwest Bureau. In early 1943, Mao Zedong personally wrote the slogan “The Party’s interests come first” to acknowledge Xi's contributions.

In February 1943, he was designated Secretary of the CCP Suide Prefectural Committee and Political Commissar of the Suimi Garrison Area and the Independent First Brigade. During this period, he advocated for the model worker Liu Yuhou and furthered the Great Production Campaign. He also endeavored to rectify communist deviations throughout the Yan'an Rectification Movement.

In June 1945, Xi was elected as an alternative member of the CCP Central Committee during the 7th National Congress, and in August, he assumed the role of Deputy Head of the CCP Central Organization Department. In the same year, he became the head of the Northwest Bureau. He additionally held the position of Political Commissar for the provisional command during the counteroffensive campaign at Yetai Mountain (Chinese: 爷台山), successfully repelling Nationalist forces that had infiltrated the border area.

=== Second Kuomintang-Communist Civil War ===
Following the Second Sino-Japanese War, Xi maintained his position in the Northwest region. He was designated Secretary of the CCP Northwest Bureau and Political Commissar of the Shaanxi-Gansu-Ningxia-Jinsui Joint Defense Forces. In November 1946, he effectively convinced Hu Jingduo, the deputy commander of the Kuomintang's Shaanbei Security Command during the Hengshan Uprising in northern Shaanxi, to defect to the Communist faction, thereby bolstering the CCP's influence in northern Shaanxi.

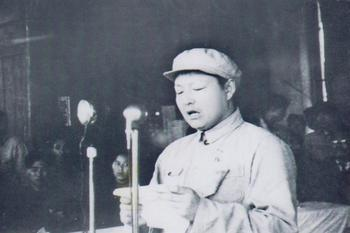
In June 1949, Xi Zhongxun spoke at a mass rally in Xi’an to mobilize support for the city's defense.

In early 1947, Xi was designated as the Political Commissar of the Shaanxi-Gansu-Ningxia Field Army and participated in the command of the Battle of Xihuachi. In March, as Hu Zongnan's Nationalist troops initiated a significant offensive against Yan’an, the Central Military Commission consolidated all regional forces under the unified command of Peng Dehuai and Xi Zhongxun. Xi, formerly the Vice Political Commissar of the Northwest Field Corps, played a pivotal role in the significant engagements at Qinghuabian, Yangma River, and Panlong Town—collectively referred to as the "three consecutive victories." In late May, Xi Zhongxun and Peng Dehuai orchestrated a significant offensive in eastern Gansu, targeting Ma Hongbin's soldiers and recapturing crucial regions such as Huan County, Dingbian and Jingbian.

As of July 1947, Xi remained the Deputy Political Commissar of the Northwest Field Army and the Political Commissar of the Joint Defense Forces. He collaborated closely with He Long to implement military restructuring, political education, and support operations in the rear area. In February 1948, he assumed the role of Political Commissar of the Joint Defense Military District, and in February 1949, he became the Political Commissar of the Northwest Military Region. In June 1949, he was designated Third Secretary of the CCP Northwest Bureau, significantly contributing to the ultimate liberation of Northwest China.

== People's Republic of China ==
=== Early period of the PRC ===
Subsequent to the establishment of the People's Republic of China, Xi Zhongxun was designated as a member of the Central People's Government, a member of the People's Revolutionary Military Commission, the Second Secretary of the CCP Northwest Bureau, Vice Chairman and acting Chairman of the Northwest Military and Political Committee, Vice Chairman of the Northwest Administrative Committee, and Political Commissar of both the First Field Army and the Northwest Military Region. He managed all significant party, government, and military matters in the Northwest region for an extended duration. He was the youngest leader of a major regional bureau. Xi spearheaded initiatives to assume control of urban governance, eradicate banditry and local tyrants, execute land reform, enforce campaigns against counterrevolutionaries. In this capacity, Xi was known for his moderate policies and the use of non-military means to pacify rebellious areas.

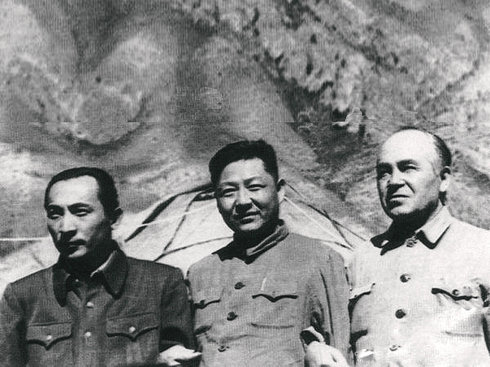
Burhan Shahidi (right) with Xi Zhongxun (middle) and Seypidin Azizi (left) in July 1952, after successfully quelling the Ospan Batyr insurgency.

Xi was sometimes critical of the land reform movement, and was an advocate for the position of the middle peasantry. As violence increased in 1948, Xi reported that activists in the northwest had sometimes falsely designated landlords and manufactured struggle. In 1952, Xi Zhongxun halted the campaign of Wang Zhen and Deng Liqun to implement land reform and class struggle to pastoralist regions of Xinjiang. Xi, based on experience in Inner Mongolia, advised against assigning class labels and waging class struggle among pastoralists, but was ignored by Wang and Deng who directed the seizure of livestock from landowners and land from religious authorities. The policies inflamed social unrest in pastoralist northern Xinjiang where Ospan Batyr uprising had just been quelled. With the support of Mao Zedong, Xi reversed the policies, had Wang Zhen relieved from Xinjiang and released over a thousand herders from prison.

In July 1951, following the Communists' defeat of the Ma Clique armies in Qinghai, remnants of the Muslim warlords incited rebellion among Tibetan tribesmen. Among those who took up arms was chieftain Xiang Qian of the Nganglha Tribe in eastern Qinghai. As the PLA sent troops to quell the uprising, Xi Zhongxun urged for a political solution. Numerous envoys including Geshe Sherab Gyatso and the Panchen Lama went to negotiate. Despite Xiang Qian's rejection of 17 proposals and the PLA's successful seizure of the chieftain's villages, Xi persisted in seeking a political resolution. He released captured tribesmen, offered generous terms to Xiang Qian and forgave those who took part in the uprising. In July 1952, Xiang Qian returned from hiding in the mountains, pledged his allegiance to the People's Republic and was invited by Xi to attend the graduation ceremony of the Northwest Nationalities College in Lanzhou. In 1953, Xiang Qian became the chief of Jainca County. Mao compared Xi's deft treatment of Xiang Qian to Zhuge Liang's conciliation of Meng Huo in the Romance of the Three Kingdoms.

Xi maintained a close relationship with Chökyi Gyaltsen, the 10th Panchen Lama, whom he first met in 1951. The Panchen Lama regard Xi as a good teacher and helpful friend. In 1951, Xi described the Panchen Lama as a progressive force in Tibet.

In September 1952, in anticipation of the execution of the 1st Five-Year Plan, the central government resolved to dismantle the six extensive administrative regions and convened prominent regional military and political figures in Beijing, including Gao Gang, Rao Shushi, Deng Zihui, Deng Xiaoping, and Xi Zhongxun—an event historically denoted as the “Five Horses Entering Beijing”. Xi Zhongxun was designated as Minister of the Publicity Department of the Chinese Communist Party and concurrently served as deputy director and Party Secretary of the Government Administration Council's Committee on Culture and Education. He spearheaded the formation of the guiding policy: "Rectify and enhance, prioritize development, elevate quality, and progress steadily".

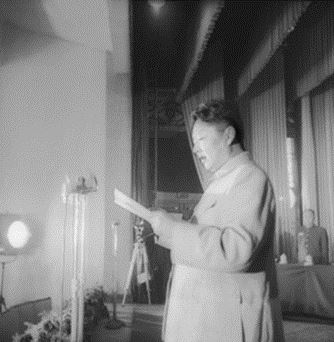
Xi Zhongxun reads the military rank conferment order in 1955 as Secretary-General of the State Council.

Beginning in September 1953, Xi held successive positions as Secretary-General of the Government Administration Council of the Central People's Government and subsequently as Secretary-General of the State Council. When the 14th Dalai Lama visited Beijing in 1954 for several months of political meetings and studies in Chinese and Marxism, Xi spent time with the Tibetan leader, who fondly recalled Xi as "very friendly, comparatively open-minded, very nice." As a gift, the Dalai Lama gave Xi an Omega watch. When the Dalai Lama's brother Gyalo Thondup visited Beijing in the early 1980s, Xi was still wearing that watch.

At the 8th National Congress of the Chinese Communist Party in 1956, he was elected a member of the CCP Central Committee. In May 1957, Xi and Yang Shangkun held the PRC's first meeting on petitioning work. In April 1959, he became a vice-premier and worked under Premier Zhou Enlai in directing the State Council's lawmaking and policy research functions. Xi was the youngest of the 16 vice-premiers serving between 1959-1965. For ten years, he aided Premier Zhou in overseeing the State Council's daily functions and contributed to the development of significant national policies, legislation, and regulations, in addition to engaging in critical state and diplomatic matters.

=== Downfall ===
In 1962, Li Jiantong's novel Liu Zhidan commenced serial publishing in Guangming Daily, Workers' Daily, and China Youth Daily. Subsequent to its publication, Kang Sheng denounced the novel as "anti-Party" and mandated the Workers' Publishing House to produce 600 copies of its fifth draft and 300 copies of its second draft for the Central Committee of the Chinese Communist Party's review, aiming to implicate Xi Zhongxun, Jia Tuofu, and Liu Jingfan as constituents of an anti-Party faction.

In August 1962, a preliminary conference for the 10th Plenary Session of the 8th National Congress of the Chinese Communist Party convened in Beijing, during which Kang Sheng claimed that Liu Zhidan represented an effort to rehabilitate Gao Gang. On September 24, 1962, the 10th Plenary Session officially met under Mao Zedong's leadership, during which he presented a political report entitled "On Class, Situation, Contradiction, and Party Unity", which supported Kang Sheng's allegations. A special investigative committee was soon formed, led by Kang Sheng, to examine the purported political transgressions of Xi Zhongxun, Jia Tuofu, and Liu Jingfan. In 1963, the committee determined that Liu Zhidan represented "an effort to rehabilitate Gao Gang" and "an act of venerating Xi Zhongxun." Consequently, Xi, Jia, and Liu were designated as constituents of the purported "Xi-Jia-Liu Anti-Party Clique." Xi Zhongxun was subjected to an investigation at the Central Party School.

=== Cultural Revolution ===
From December 1965 to January 1967, Xi was sent to work as deputy factory director at the Luoyang Mining Machinery Plant, where he was in charge of safety and technical operations. He was assigned to a metalworking workshop and participated in manual labor, study sessions, and other daily activities. Reflecting on this period later, Xi described it as "a most unusual experience" and said it felt like "a year at an industrial university."

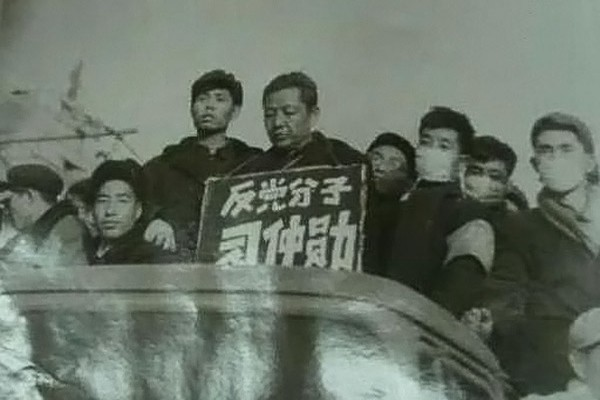
Xi Zhongxun was brought to a struggle session at Northwest A&F University in September 1967, during the Cultural Revolution.

On January 1, 1967, Red Flag magazine disseminated Yao Wenyuan’s piece On the Counterrevolutionary Two-Faced Person Zhou Yang, which explicitly condemned Zhou Yang and the novel Liu Zhidan, so once more directing criticism at Xi Zhongxun. Subsequently, Xi was forcibly transported to Xi'an by Red Guards from Shaanxi, where he was incarcerated and endured struggle sessions. During this period, he corresponded with Premier Zhou Enlai, detailing his persecution and articulating his bewilderment regarding the Cultural Revolution, which captured Zhou's attention. On March 19, 1967, on Zhou's directive, the Shaanxi Provincial Military District assigned military security to Xi by transferring him to the district headquarters.

On October 2, rebel elements once more showcased Xi Zhongxun at a huge denunciation protest held at Yishan Middle School in Fuping County. Local people, appreciative of Xi's initiatives in distributing relief food during the 1962 famine, protected him from the sun with umbrellas and even confronted the Red Guards in his defense. On October 31 and subsequently in early November, Xi corresponded with both Mao Zedong and Zhou Enlai. In January 1968, the Central Committee facilitated Xi's relocation by a special aircraft to the PLA Beijing Garrison for "protective supervision."

From early 1968 until May 1975, Xi was confined in near-total isolation within a small room measuring 7 to 8 square meters at the Jiaotong Cadre School near Beixin Bridge in Beijing. During the winter of 1972, pursuant to a specific command from Zhou Enlai, Xi was permitted a brief reunion with his family. At that time, he allegedly could not differentiate between his two sons, Xi Jinping and Xi Yuanping. In May 1975, the "protective supervision" was removed; nonetheless, Xi continued to reside in Luoyang, occupying employee accommodations at a local refractory materials factory, where he persisted in undergoing political scrutiny until February 1978.

=== Guangdong ===
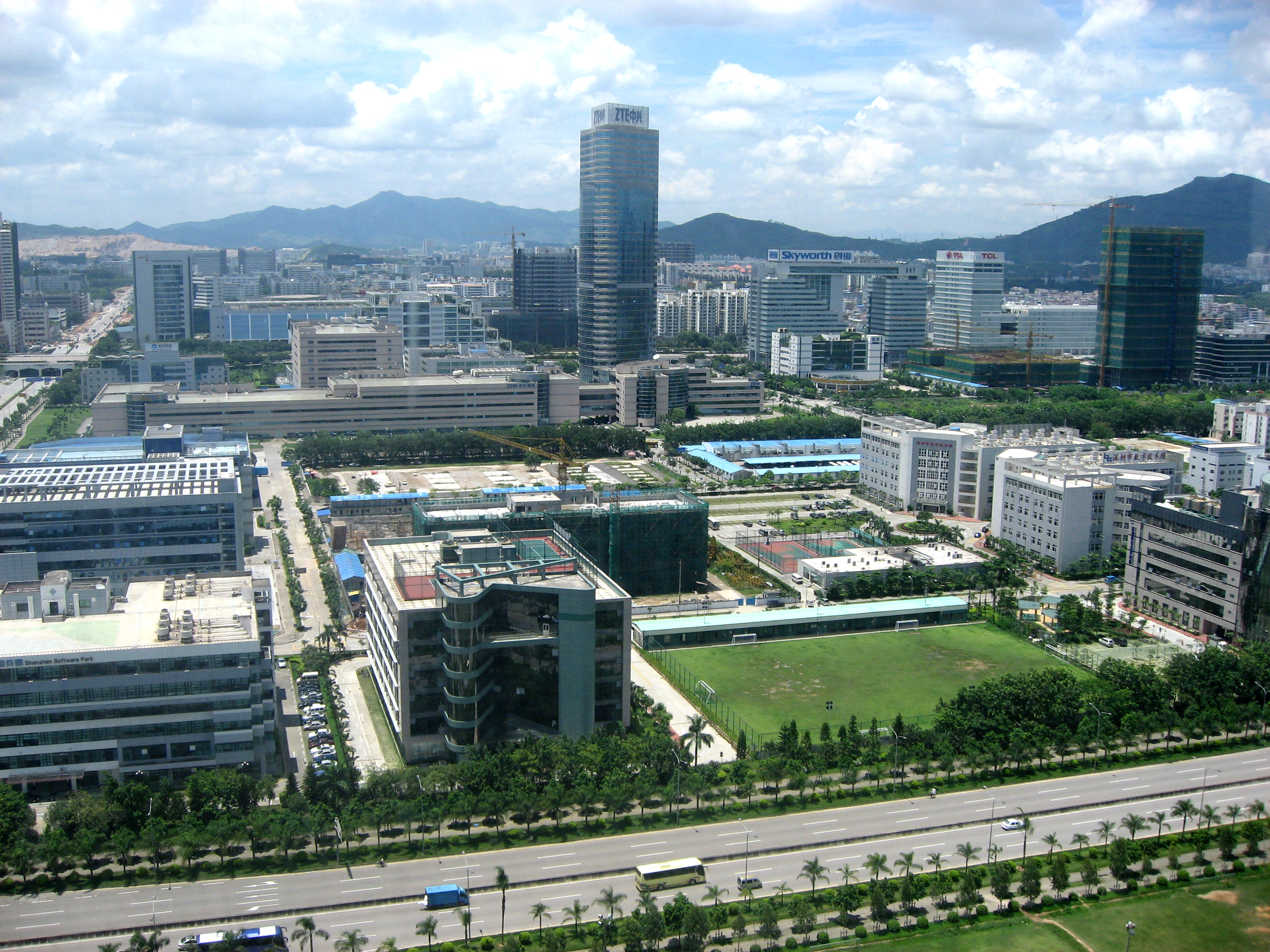
To curb further immigration to Hong Kong, in 1979, Xi Zhongxun arranged for the creation of special economic zones in Guangdong Province including Shenzhen, which has grown to become one of the largest cities in China.

On 22 February 1978, Xi Zhongxun returned to Beijing to participate as a specially invited delegate in the First Session of the 5th National Committee of the Chinese People's Political Consultative Conference. Xi was assigned by Ye Jianying to Guangdong. Subsequent to April 1978, he was designated Second Secretary of the Guangdong Provincial Committee of the Chinese Communist Party, arriving in Guangzhou that month. In December, he ascended to the position of First Secretary of Guangdong and Director of the Guangdong Provincial Revolutionary Committee. In January 1980, he assumed the positions of First Political Commissar and First Party Secretary of the Guangzhou Military Region. During the third plenary session of the 11th Central Committee of the Chinese Communist Party, Xi was appointed as a member of the Central Committee.

In Guangdong, Xi oversaw the redressing of the legacy of the Cultural Revolution. During the Guangdong Provincial Party Committee Standing Committee session in August and September 1978, Guangdong was discussed as not attacking the Gang of Four enough. Xi supported the full rehabilitation of Gu Dacun and Feng Baiju, who were purged during the "anti-localism" campaigns of the 1950s, with the Guangdong leadership starting an investigation in the early 1970s. In August 1979, Xi submitted a draft that partially exonerated Gu and Feng, which was then approved by the CCP Central Committee; they were later fully exonerated in 1982. Xi also supported the rehabilitation of Peng Pai.

When he first arrived in Guangdong, he was told the provincial government had long been struggling to hold back the exodus of Chinese to Hong Kong since 1951. At the time, daily wages in Guangdong averaged 0.70 yuan, about 1/100 of wages in Hong Kong. Xi understood the disparity in standards of living and called for economic liberalisation in Guangdong. When the Central Working Conference took place in Beijing from April 5 to 28, 1978, along with Yang Shangkun, who at the time was also a key Guangdong official, Xi told Deng Xiaoping that Guangdong should become a national demonstration zone for Reform and Opening Up. In meetings in April 1979, Xi convinced Deng to permit Guangdong to make its own foreign trade policy decisions and to invite foreign investment to projects in experimental areas along the provincial border with Hong Kong and Macau and in Shantou, which has a large overseas diaspora. As for the name of the experimental areas, Deng said, "let's call them, 'special zones', [after all, your] Shaanxi-Gansu Border Region began as a 'special zone'." Deng added, "The Central Government has no funds, but we can give you some favorable policies." Borrowing a phrase from their guerrilla war days, Deng told Xi, "You have to find a way, to fight a bloody path out." Xi submitted a formal proposal on the creation of special zones, later renamed special economic zones and in July 1979, the Central Committee and State Council approved the creation of the first four special economic zones in Shantou, Shenzhen, Zhuhai, Xiamen and Hainan. Xi was also the one that decided on the name of "Shenzhen".

=== National People's Congress ===
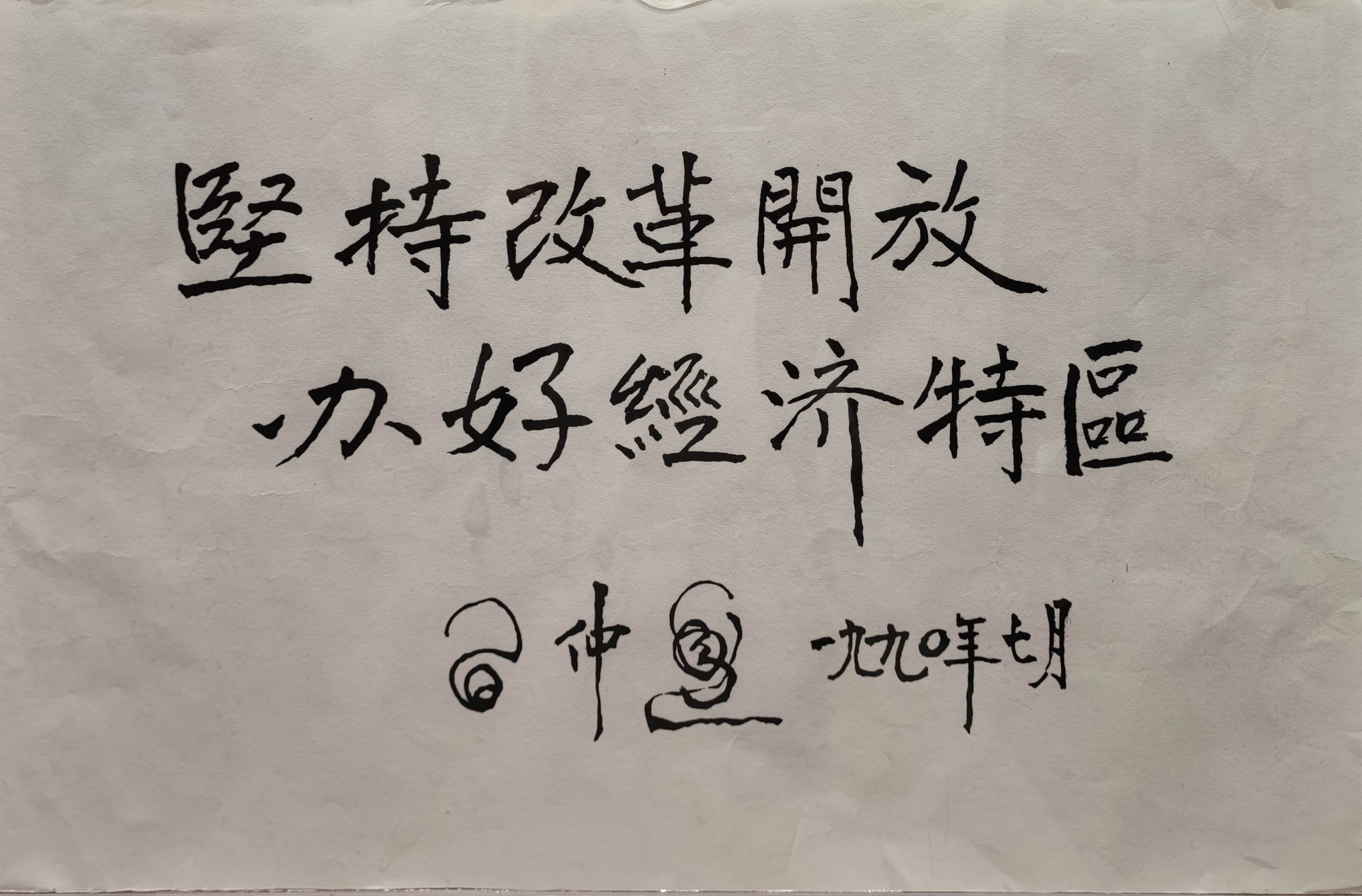
Xi Zhongxun's Inscription for Zhuhai Special Economic Zone in July 1990

On February 25, 1980, the Central Committee formally rescinded the political charges against Xi Zhongxun, exonerating him. In September of that year, he was chosen Vice Chairman of the Standing Committee of the 5th National People's Congress, reentering the Party and state leadership. He then held the position of Chairman of the Legislative Affairs Committee of the Standing Committee of the National People's Congress concurrently.

=== Secretariat ===
On March 28, 1981, he commenced his involvement in the Secretariat of the CCP Central Committee. In June 1981, during the Sixth Plenary Session of the 11th Central Committee, he was appointed as a Secretary of the Secretariat. In September 1982, during the First Plenary Session of the 12th Central Committee, Xi was appointed as a member of the Politburo of the CCP Central Committee and as a Member of the Secretariat, tasked with supervising the Secretariat's daily operations. During his time as a Politburo member, Xi often focused on ethnic minority policies and religion policies. His view was that ethnic relations in Xinjiang and Tibet Autonomous Region should focus on addressing local grievances, working collaboratively with local ethnic minority leaders, and promoting economic development. In 1987, Deng Xiaoping and powerful elder Chen Yun were dissatisfied with the liberal inclination of Hu Yaobang, and called a meeting to force Hu to resign as CCP General Secretary. Xi was the only one that defended Hu. In November 1987, during the First Plenary Session of the 13th Central Committee, Xi Zhongxun resigned from the Central Committee and discontinued his roles as a Politburo member and Secretary of the Secretariat.

=== Return to the National People's Congress ===
In April 1988, Xi was chosen as First Vice Chairman of the Standing Committee of the 7th National People's Congress and simultaneously held the position of Chairman of the Internal and Judicial Affairs Committee, serving as the deputy to Wan Li. In March 1993, at the age of eighty, Xi resigned from his position as First Vice Chairman of the NPC Standing Committee following the First Session of the 8th National People's Congress.

=== Retirement and death ===
He subsequently resided in Shenzhen, Guangdong, for several years. On October 1, 1999, Xi Zhongxun participated in the grand commemoration in Beijing celebrating the 50th anniversary of the People's Republic of China. While attending the commemoration, he said he had decided to support the "party center with Jiang Zemin as the core".

In 2001, cancer was found in Xi's body, while scans in January 2002 showed cancer in the left kidney. In April, Xi returned to Beijing. Xi Zhongxun died 24 May 2002. His funeral and subsequent cremation at Babaoshan Revolutionary Cemetery on 30 May was attended by party and state leaders, including CCP General Secretary Jiang Zemin, Premier Zhu Rongji, and Vice President Hu Jintao. His ashes were subsequently buried at a cemetery named in honor of him at Fuping County. His official obituary described him as "an outstanding proletarian revolutionary," "a great communist soldier," and "one of the main founders and leaders of the revolutionary base areas in the Shaanxi-Gansu border region."

== Personal life ==
Xi had a strong interest in family history. He had positive memories of his parents, describing his father as "extremely kind-hearted" and strict and his mother as "diligent and virtuous". Xi described his family background as poor, becoming middle peasants in 1919 or 1920.

In 1936, Xi married Hao Mingzhu, the niece of revolutionary fighter Wu Daifeng, in Shaanxi. The union lasted until 1944, and the couple had three children: one son, Xi Fuping (aka Xi Zhengning), and two daughters, Xi Heping, and Xi Ganping. According to Xi, he and Hao "were young and quick-tempered. Neither of us would surrender to the other. We acted willfully. Ultimately, we took the path we did." According to official records, Xi Heping died during the Cultural Revolution due to persecution, which historians have concluded means that she most likely committed suicide under duress. Little is known about Xi Ganping, except that she was retired by 2013 and regularly appears at meetings of Princelings. Xi Zhengning, meanwhile, was a researcher in the Ministry of Defence but later pursued a bureaucratic career; he died in 1998.

In 1944, Xi Zhongxun married Qi Xin, his second wife, and had four children: Qi Qiaoqiao, Xi An'an, Xi Jinping and Xi Yuanping. Xi Jinping became the General Secretary of the Chinese Communist Party and Chairman of the Central Military Commission, thus the paramount leader of China, from 15 November 2012, and has been President of the People's Republic of China since March 2013.

== In popular culture ==
In 2024, the first episode of 'Time in the Northwest', a state-sponsored Chinese historical drama series focused on the life of Xi Zhongxun, premiered on CCTV.

Party political offices
Preceded by Wei Guoqing	Secretary of the CCP Guangdong Provincial Committee; 1978–1980	Succeeded by Ren Zhongyi
Preceded by Lu Dingyi	Head of the Publicity Department of the CCP Central Committee; 1953–1954	Succeeded by Lu Dingyi
Government offices
Preceded by Wei Guoqing	Governor of Guangdong; 1979–1981	Succeeded by Liu Tianfu
Preceded by Li Weihan	Secretary General of the State Council; 1953–1965	Succeeded by Zhou Rongxin
