= Liu Zhidan =

Chinese military commander (1903-1936)

- 刘志丹
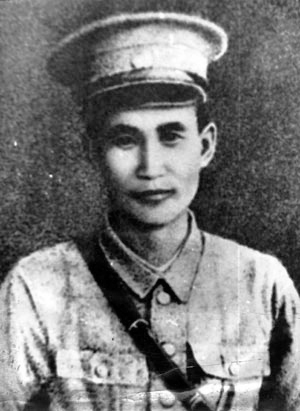
- Liu at Whampoa Academy c. 1925-1927
- Born: June 17, 1903; Shaanxi, Qing China
- Died: April 14, 1936 (aged 32); Liulin County, Shanxi, Republic of China
- Education: Whampoa Military Academy
- Children: 1
- Military career
- Allegiance: Republic of China; Communist China
- Branch: Chinese Red Army
- Service years: 1925–1936
- Rank: Senior General of the People's Liberation Army
- Conflicts: Northern Expedition; Chinese Civil War †; Shaanxi-Gansu encirclement campaigns; First; Second; Third

Liu Zhidan (4 October 1903 (Note: 1902 by several sources) – 14 April 1936), also known as Liu Chih-tan, was a Chinese military commander and Communist leader, who founded the Shaanxi-Gansu-Ningxia Base Area in north-west China, which became the Yan'an Soviet.

== Biography ==
Liu Zhidan was born in 1903 into a literati family in Bao'an, since renamed Zhidan County in his honour, in northern Shaanxi Province. He was given the name Jinggui (景桂, Jǐngguì), which he later changed to Zhidan. Liu attended the first primary school in the county and was a member of the first graduating class and gained acceptance to Yulin Middle School. He joined the Communist Party in 1925. In Yulin, he was influenced by the May Fourth Movement and joined the Chinese Communist Youth League and the Society for Mutual Progress, a progressive civic organization.

After the May 30th Movement, he and fellow students traveled to Shanxi, Beijing and Shanghai, before going to Guangzhou, where he was admitted to the Whampoa Academy. In July 1927, he joined the Northern Expedition as an officer of the National Revolutionary Army and then was assigned to the National People's Army of Feng Yuxiang, who was allied with the NRA at the time. After the April 12 Incident in 1927, Liu, as a Communist, fled from Feng's army and joined the armed Communist opposition. After setbacks in Nanchang, Anhui and Shanghai, Liu returned to Shaanxi and organized a rural-based guerilla force. In May 1928, he launched the Weihua Uprising (in modern Weinan) with several thousand men and established the National People's Army of the Northwest. In June the uprising was put down by Song Zheyuan and Liu fled to northern Shaanxi (Shaanbei).

In his native northern Shaanxi, Liu Zhidan founded the Shaanxi-Gansu Border Region and Northern Shaanxi Region base areas, and established the 26th and 27th Corps of the Chinese Red Army. In 1934, he visited the injured Xie Zichang and the two decided to combine the Shaan-Gan Border Region and the Shaan-bei party and military bodies, which ultimately resulted in the formation of the Northwest Work Committee. In the spring of 1934 and fall of 1935, Xie defeated two large suppression campaigns by Nationalist forces and managed to merge the two base areas, controlling 22 counties.

Chiang Kai-shek sent Zhang Xueliang to attack Liu's base in 1935 but Zhang's troops were soundly defeated by Liu in the Battle of Laoshan. But shortly thereafter, Liu Zhidan was purged at the hands of commissars sent from Shanghai, then headquarters of the Communists. He and his comrades were jailed. Many subordinates were executed. He was about to be executed when Mao Zedong and the Long Marchers arrived in the Northwest, halted the rectification campaign and had Liu and his comrades released. Liu's base became a refuge for the other defeated Red Armies and grew to become the Yan'an Soviet, the primary base of the Chinese Communists until 1947.

Liu himself was dispatched by Mao to lead the Eastern Expedition against Yan Xishan. He was killed in battle in April 1936 and named a martyr. His home county of Bao'an was later named after him.

== Views ==
Liu's philosophy of revolution was based on what academic Joseph Torigian summarizes as a "big tent". In 1929, he described his view that achieving revolution in China would require uniting with "the masses and with people from all walks of life, including Nationalist officials, gentry figures, and even old gentlemen." Xi Zhongxun, who worked closely with Liu in the northwest, described Liu as someone who listened to those with differing opinions and sought to persuade them, and noted Liu's ability to bring together warlords, Nationalist officials, militia members, and members of secret societies like the Gelaohui.

Liu had frequent disagreements with more radical members of the Communist Party. Liu described them as "old widows, dreaming of a perfect world but oblivious to the problems of the real world."

Despite his general "big tent" philosophy, Liu could also be violent. Killing gentry was a path to join the party, and the northeast of Shaanxi descended into "a brutal cycle of revenge killings", as Liu ordered public executions of local rich individuals. At one point, a former colleague begged Liu to save his life; Liu was merciless, telling his troops to "Kill the bastard." On another occasion, Liu personally slit the throat of a traitor and let him bleed to death.

== Legacy ==
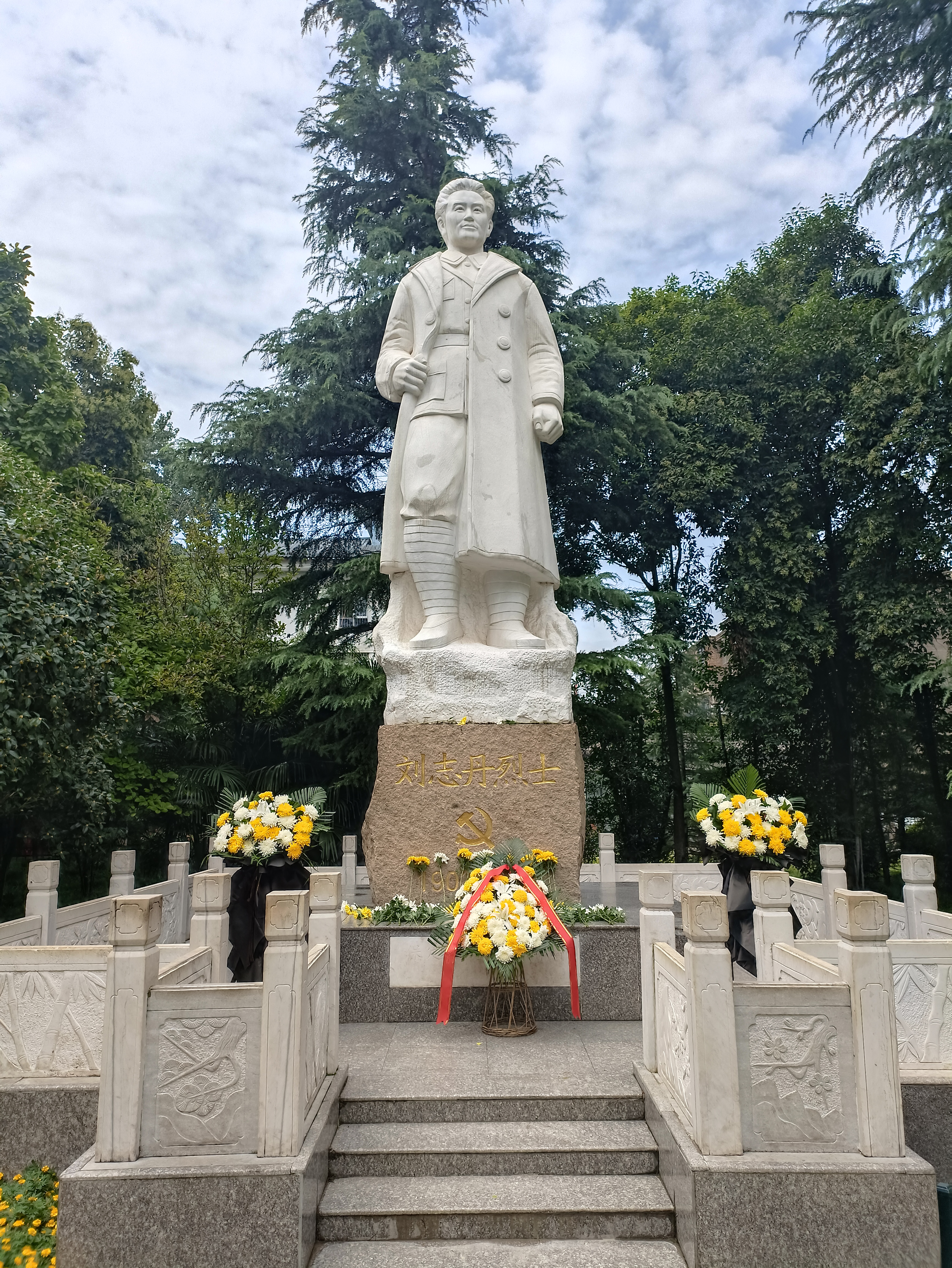
A statue of Liu at Revolution Park in Xincheng, Xi'an

Liu Zhidan was hailed as martyr at the time of his death. His younger brother would become vice chairman of the Shaanxi-Gansu-Ningxia border region in 1947. Liu's posthumous reputation would remain until 1962 when a biographical novel about his life (titled Liu Zhidan) was criticized by Kang Sheng as an anti-party conspiracy because one of the characters in the novel alluded to purged former leader Gao Gang. Xi Zhongxun, one of his former comrades and subordinates was purged as a result. During the Cultural Revolution, Liu's grave was ransacked by Red Guards. After the Cultural Revolution, Liu's legacy was rehabilitated.
