= GQN =

GQN may refer to:

- GQN list (Grandfathered, Questionable, and Non-approved), a list of minerals
- GQN, division code for Ganquan County, China
- GQN, ISO 639-3 code for Terêna language
