= Third encirclement campaign against the Shaanxi–Gansu Soviet =

1935 military campaign

- Part of the Chinese Civil War
Date	August 20, 1935 – October 25, 1935
Location	Shaanxi and Gansu, China
Result	Communist victory

Belligerents
Nationalist China	Chinese Red Army

Commanders and leaders
Chiang Kai-shek	Liu Zhidan 刘志丹 (Early stage); Xu Haidong

Strength
100,000+	14,000

Casualties and losses
9,000+	?

The third encirclement campaign against the Shaanxi–Gansu Soviet was an encirclement campaign launched by the Chinese Nationalist Government that was intended to destroy the communist Shaanxi–Gansu Soviet and its Chinese Red Army in the local region. It was responded by the Communists' third counter-encirclement campaign at Shaanxi–Gansu Soviet (Chinese: 陕甘苏区第三次反围剿), also called by the communists as the third counter-encirclement campaign at Shaanxi–Gansu Revolutionary Base (Chinese: 陕甘革命根据地第三次反围剿), in which the local Chinese Red Army successfully defended their soviet republic in the border region of Shaanxi and Gansu provinces against the Nationalist attacks from August 1935 to October 25, 1935. Some Chinese communist historians also consider the Zhiluozhen Campaign fought a month later as part of this third counter-encirclement campaign at Shaanxi–Gansu Soviet.

== Prelude ==
After the failed second encirclement campaign against the Shaanxi–Gansu Soviet in July, 1935, Chiang Kai-shek once again immediately mobilized more than 100,000 troops of warlords of Northeast China, Shaanxi, Shanxi, Suiyuan, Ningxia, and Gansu to launch the third encirclement campaign against Shaanxi–Gansu Soviet aimed to eradicate the local communists. Chiang believed that launching another round of attack on the numerically and technically inferior enemy would prevent them from regrouping and rest, and when the enemy was still weak from last campaign, it would be easier to defeat because the communists had no other troops to rotate, while the nationalists could deploy their own fresh troops to overwhelm the enemy, resulting in final victory.

However, the nationalist effort was seriously hampered by the fact that all troops deployed were warlord troops, and all of them were wary of each other, as well as Chiang himself. Every warlord was worried that others (including Chiang) would sacrifice his troops to save their own. As a result, there was not much coordination and cooperation between nationalists themselves, and this weakness was exploited by the Communists to the maximum.

== Strategies ==
The nationalist strategy was to attack the communist base from three sides. At the southern front, nationalist troops would push northward slowly but steadily, while nationalist forces in the eastern and western fronts would strike simultaneously, squeezing the enemy to its eventual eradication. Nationalist force at the northern front would take a defensive position, fighting a blocking action to prevent the enemy from escape.

Communist high command had correctly deduced the lack of trust among warlords, and the resulting lack of cooperation. They decided to first annihilate the nationalist force in the east (consisting of troops of Shanxi and Suiyuan warlords), and then to strike the nationalist 67th Army of the Northeast China in the south. Once this main force of the nationalist forces was defeated, the warlords would retreat.

== Order of battle ==
Nationalists: 100,000+ troops in 5 armies totaling 15 divisions, with the main attack force as:

- 67th Army
  - 107th Division
  - 110th Division
  - 129th Division

Communists: 7,000+ troops and 7,000+ guerrillas and militias, Red Army regulars included:

- 15th Legion
  - 25th Army
  - 26th Army
  - 27th Army

== First stage ==
On August 20, 1935, the first shot of the third encirclement campaign against Shaanxi–Gansu Soviet was fired when both sides made contact. Communist troops consisted of soldiers from the 26th Army, 27th Army of the Chinese Red Army and guerrillas totaling five regiments, launched their surprise attack at the eastern front in the regions of Mu Family's Plain (Mujiayuan, 慕家塬) of Wubao County, and Dingxianyan (定仙墕) of Suide County, against the unsuspecting nationalist troops consisted of troops of Shanxi and Suiyuan warlords. After suffering several hundred fatalities and over eighteen hundred being captured alive by the enemy within a single day of fighting, Shanxi and Suiyuan warlords withdrew their troops back to the eastern bank of the Yellow River on August 21, 1935, and never attempt to engage the enemy again for the rest of the campaign, and the communists' eastern front was thus secured. The first and the only nationalist force that dared to venture into the communist base at the early stage of the campaign was driven out of the communist base and knocked out of action for good. Despite suffering very minor casualties, the political commissar of the communist 27th Army Wu Huanfa (吴焕发, 1907–1935) was killed in the battle, the communist with the highest ranking killed in the entire campaign.

The very first battle resulting in a nationalist defeat had serious undermined the nationalist morale, and the actions of nationalist forces of Shanxi and Suiyuan had provided other warlords an excuse to follow: by claiming taking a much more prudent approach, all nationalist forces took a defensive posture, stationed them outside the communist base without make any daring moves to attack the enemy. Chiang Kai-shek, the nationalist commander-in-chief who was thousands miles away was powerless to do anything about the situation for the time being, since he had to take up the command despite being far away from the battlefield, due to the fact none of the warlords allied with him trusted each other and would take orders from each other, letting along cooperating and helping each other. A stalemate was reached and lasted nearly a month, providing ample time for the communists to rest and regroup. By mid-September, 1935, the 25th Army of the Chinese Red Army reached the communist base, joining their comrades to further boost their strength. The Chinese Red Army was reorganized as the 15th Legion, consisted of the 25th, 26th, and 27th armies, totaling more than seven thousands regulars. Xu Haidong became the commander-in-chief of the legion, while Liu Zhidan (刘志丹) became the deputy commander-in-chief, while Cheng Zihua (程子华) became its political commissar. This newly formed 15th Legion of the Chinese Red Army was supported by the local communist guerrillas and militia that also totaled more than seven thousands, and both sides were ready for the next stage.

== Second stage ==
Realizing the enemy was getting larger and stronger, thus more difficult to eradicate, nationalist forces switched to an offensive mode. While nationalists in the north, east and west still took a defensive posture to prevent enemy from escaping, nationalist force consisted of Zhang Xueliang's 67th Army from northeastern China in the south begun their attack toward the enemy's heartland. The 107th Division of the 67th Army advanced to Luochuan County, while sending out one of the battalion of its 619th Regiment to guard Goat's Spring (Yangquan, 羊泉). The 110th Division and the 129th Division of the 67th Army were deployed from Yanchuan County to Yan'an along the highway, with the exception of the 685th Regiment of the 129th Division, which was stationed at Ganquan County. The communists realized that the nationalists had overstretched themselves in the rugged terrain and decided to send a portion of their force to besiege the town of Ganquan, in order to lure the nationalists to the rescue. Once the nationalist reinforcement was out of the protection of the city walls and their fortifications to save their communication lines, it would be ambushed by the communist main force waiting in the regions of the Greater Labor Mountain (Dalaoshan, 大劳山) and the Lesser Labor Mountain (Xiaolaoshan, 小劳山). On September 21, 1935, communist 15th Legion marched from Eternal Plot (Yongping, 永坪) region of Yanchuan County, and two days later, they reached Wang Family's Plot (Wangjiaping, 王家坪), a region to the northwest of Ganquan County, and was ready for the next deployment.

On September 28, 1935, with the help of local communist guerrillas and militias, the 243rd Regiment of the communist 81st Division besieged the town of Ganquan, the capital of Ganquan County. At the dawn of September 29, 1935, the communist main force was deployed in the designated regions for the upcoming ambush. In the morning of October 1, 1935, the 110th Division of the nationalist 67th Army marched from Yan'an toward Ganquan, attempted to rescue the besieged town, exactly as the communists had predicted. When the nationalist reinforcement reached the region of Forty-Mile Motel (Sishilipu, 四十里铺), one regiment was left behind to secure the rear and the rest of the 110th Division of the nationalist 67th Army sped up toward Ganquan. At 2:00 PM on October 1, 1935, the nationalist reinforcement walked directly into the ambush the communists had set up for them. The 241st Regiment of the communist 81st Division launched a head-on surprise attack, while the cavalry regiment of the communist 78th Division struck from behind, cutting off the nationalists' escaping route. Meanwhile, the communist 75th Division and the communist 78th Division attacked simultaneously from both flanks. The unsuspecting nationalist reinforcement was cut off and isolated in two separate regions: in the Lesser Labor Mountain Hamlet (Xiaolaoshan Cun, 小劳山村) to the southwest of the Greater Labor Mountain, and the region of Elm Valley. After five hours of fierce fighting, the trapped 110th Division of the nationalist 67th Army was annihilated, suffering over a thousand fatalities, with every officer of brigade level and above killed, including the divisional commander He Lizhong (何立中). The other thirty-seven hundred nationalist troops were captured alive by the enemy, along with over three thousand rifles, over a hundred eighty machine guns and twelve artillery pieces, and over three hundred military horses.

== Third stage ==
After suffering the huge defeat with nearly a division completely annihilated, the nationalists were forced to change their battle plan by adopting the once successfully blockade strategy used against the main communist base in Jiangxi, and nationalist forces in the north, east and west stopped their advance completely and dug in at the border of the communist base, while nationalist force in the south adopted a gradual push northward, in an attempt to tighten the stranglehold on the enemy by eventually squeezing the enemy into annihilation. As the nationalists took a defensive posture once again, the communists decided to strikeout and break the blockade. On October 20, 1935, the vanguard of the 107th Division of the nationalist 67th Army gradually advanced to the region of Elm Grove Bridge (Yulinqiao, 榆林桥) to the south of Ganquan County, but before the nationalists could consolidate their gain and fortify their position, they were suddenly attacked by the enemy at the dawn of October 25, 1935. By the afternoon, everything was over, the nationalists suffered several hundred fatalities and over eighteen hundred were captured alive by the enemy, including Zhang Xueliang's favorite, Gao Fuyuan (高福源), one of the most capable regimental commanders of the nationalist crack unit, the 119th Regiment of the 107th Division of the nationalist 67th Army.

The last defeat on October 25, 1935 proved to be the last draw for the nationalists, and marked the end of the campaign. Witnessing the disastrous defeat of their comrades-in-arms, other nationalist warlords no longer wanted to continue the carry on the fight and exhausting their troops against the communist base. They would rather preserve their troops to protect their own turfs instead of sacrificing them for Chiang, so one by one, they withdrew their forces back to their own territory and the 3rd encirclement campaign against Shaanxi–Gansu Soviet resulted in nationalist failure, and the communist base would survive and became the base from where the communists eventually succeeded in taking over entire China one and half a decade later.

== See also ==
- Outline of the Chinese Civil War
- National Revolutionary Army
- History of the People's Liberation Army
