= First encirclement campaign against the Shaanxi–Gansu Soviet =

1934 military campaign

- Part of the Chinese Civil War
Date	March, 1934 – August 26, 1934
Location	Shaanxi & Gansu, China
Result	Communist victory

Belligerents
Nationalist China	Chinese Red Army

Commanders and leaders
Chiang Kai-shek	Liu Zhidan 刘志丹; Xie Zichang 谢子长

Strength
12,500	7,000

Casualties and losses
4,000	?

The first encirclement campaign against the Shaanxi–Gansu Soviet was an encirclement campaign launched by the Chinese Nationalist Government that was intended to destroy the communist Shaanxi–Gansu Soviet and its Chinese Red Army in the local region. It was responded by the Communists' first counter-encirclement campaign at Shaanxi–Gansu Soviet (Chinese: 陕甘苏区第一次反围剿), also called by the communists as the first counter-encirclement campaign at Shaanxi–Gansu Revolutionary Base (Chinese: 陕甘革命根据地第一次反围剿), in which the local Chinese Red Army successfully defended their soviet republic in Shaanxi and Gansu provinces against the Nationalist attacks from March 1934 to 26 August 1934.

== See also ==
- Outline of the Chinese Civil War
- National Revolutionary Army
- History of the People's Liberation Army
- Chinese Civil War
