= Xie Zichang =

Chinese Red Army general

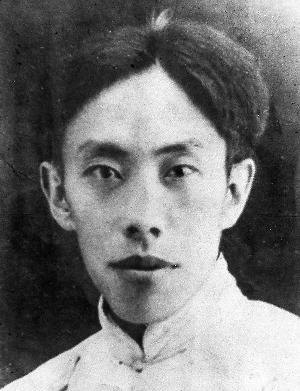
Xie Zichang in 1935

Xie Zichang (1897 - February 21, 1935, Chinese: 谢子长), originally named Shiyuan and also known as Deyuan, Zichang, and Haoru, was a native of Anding County (now Zichang County), Shaanxi. He was a key founder of the Red Army and the Soviet regime in northern Shaanxi, China. He has a son Xie Shaoming.

== Biography ==
Xie Zichang attended Xi'an First High School and Yulin High School in northern Shaanxi in 1919. He was admitted to the Taiyuan School Corps in 1922 to pursue a degree in military affairs. Upon his return to Anding County in 1924, he established a militia organisation and served as its general director. In the same year, he actively engaged in anti-imperialist activities in Beijing and Tianjin and became a member of the Progressive Youth Organisation, "Common Progress Society." He joined the Chinese Communist Party (CCP) in 1925 and was elected to the local administrative committee and the Farmers' Association in Anding County by early 1927. In an endeavour to combat feudal landlords, Xie was lauded by the public as "Xie Qingtian."

Xie, who was the battalion commander and deputy commander of the Northwest Revolutionary Army's guerrilla detachment, organised and conducted the Qingjian Uprising with Tang Shu in October 1927. He was a member of the Military Committee of the Northwest Workers' and Peasants' Revolutionary Army and served as the commander of its 3rd Brigade during the Weihua Uprising in May 1928. In 1930, Xie was the commander-in-chief of the military command department of the Shaanbei-North Action Committee, where he was responsible for the expansion of the revolution throughout Shaanxi, Ningxia, and Gansu.

The Nanliang Guerrillas and Shaanbei Guerrilla Detachment were incorporated into the Northwest Anti-Imperialist Allied Army by Xie in October 1931. In February 1932, the army was reorganised as the Shanxi-Gansu Guerrilla Army of the Chinese Workers' and Peasants' Red Army, with Xie serving as its commander-in-chief. He commanded his forces in the establishment of revolutionary bases in Gansu and Shanxi. Xie assisted the 18th Division of the Chasui Anti-Japanese Allied Army by 1933 and subsequently resumed his role in northern Shaanxi later that year, re-establishing five Red Army guerrilla detachments.

In January 1934, Xie returned to the Shaanbei base area to lead it. In 1934, Xie became the political commissar of the 42nd Division of the Red 26th Army, the chairman of the Northwest Revolutionary Military Committee of the CCP, and the commander-in-chief of the Red Army Guerrillas in northern Shaanxi. He successfully commanded his troops in repelling Nationalist attacks on the Chinese Soviet areas in northern Shaanxi.

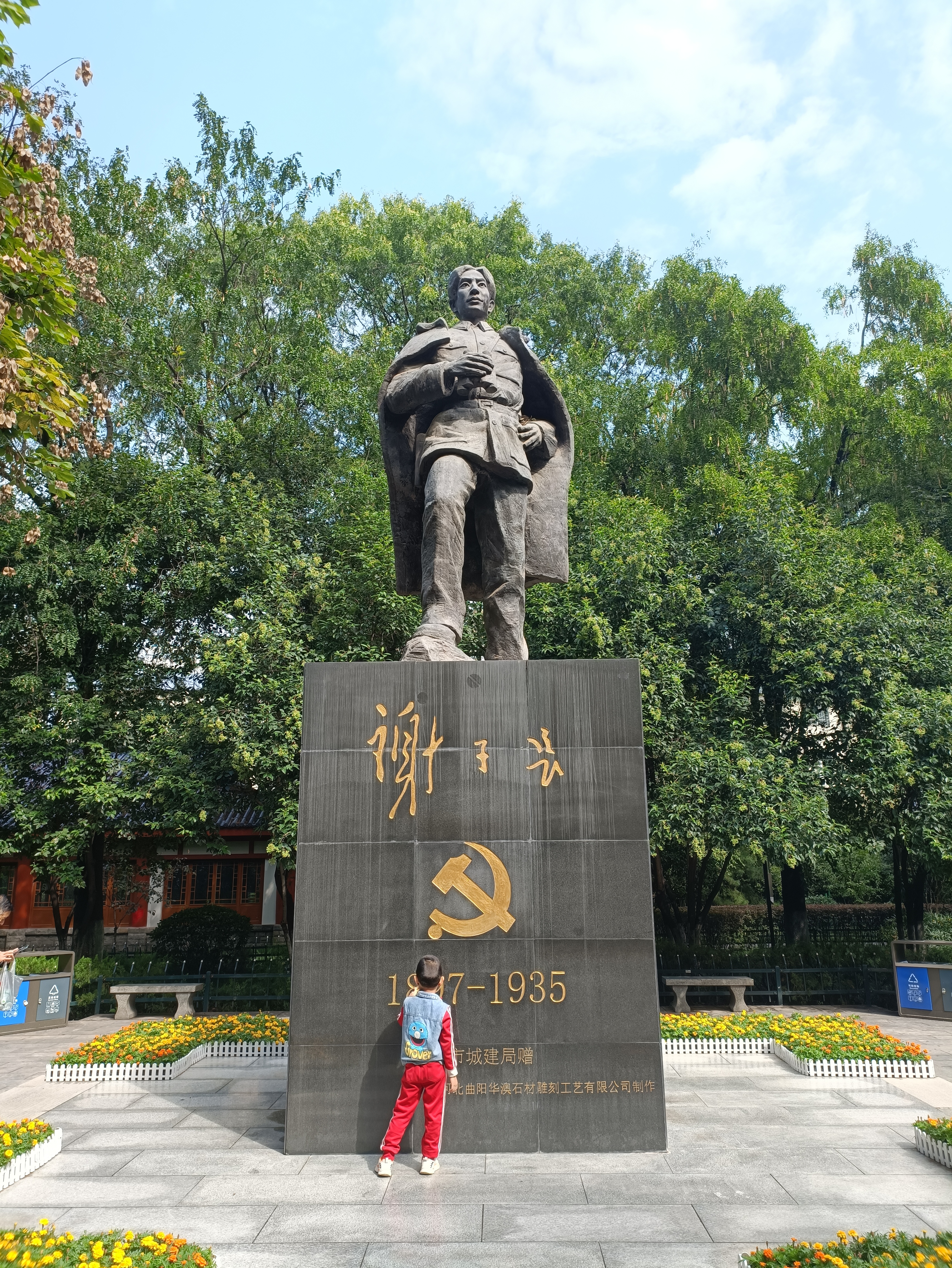
Statue of Xie Zichang in Xi'an's Revolutionary Park

Xie Zichang died in Dengjianwan, Anding County, Shaanxi Province, on February 21, 1935, as a result of complications from illness and battle wounds. While injured, he was visited by Liu Zhidan. The two decided to combine the Shaan-Gan Border Region and the Shaan-bei party and military bodies, which resulted in the formation of the Northwest Work Committee.

In September 2009, he was recognised as one of the 100 Heroes and Models who "made exceptional contributions to the establishment of New China", in recognition of his leadership and dedication.
