= Fuping County, Shaanxi =

Fuping County 富平县
- County
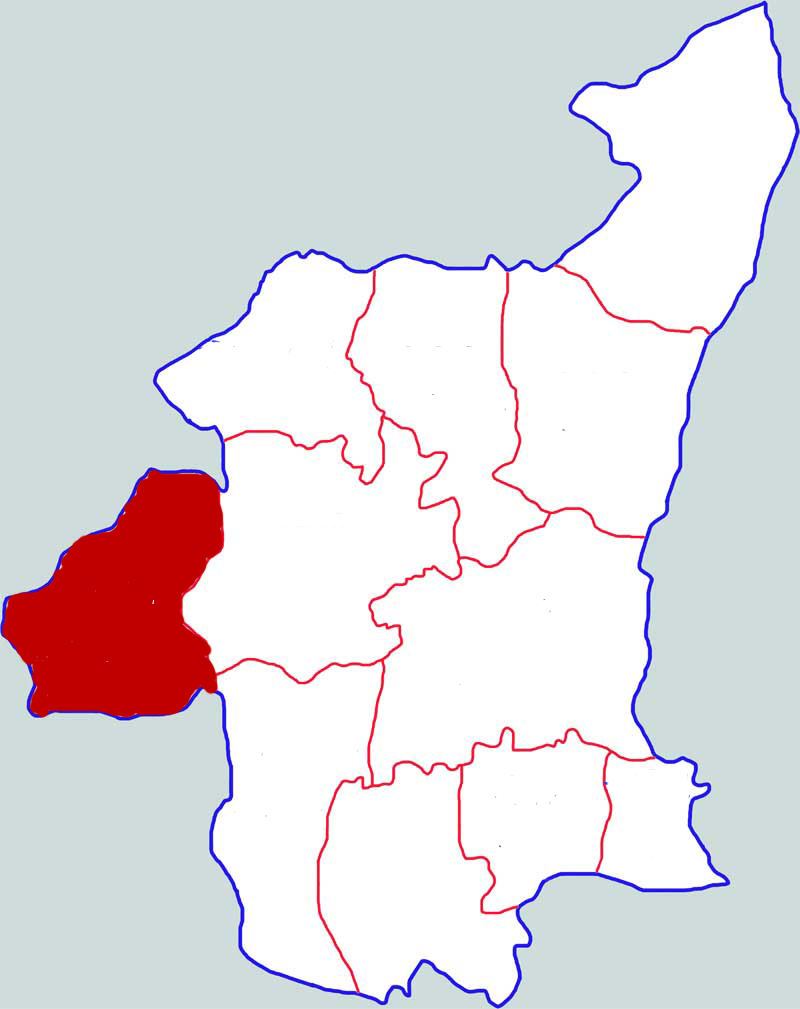
- Fuping in Weinan

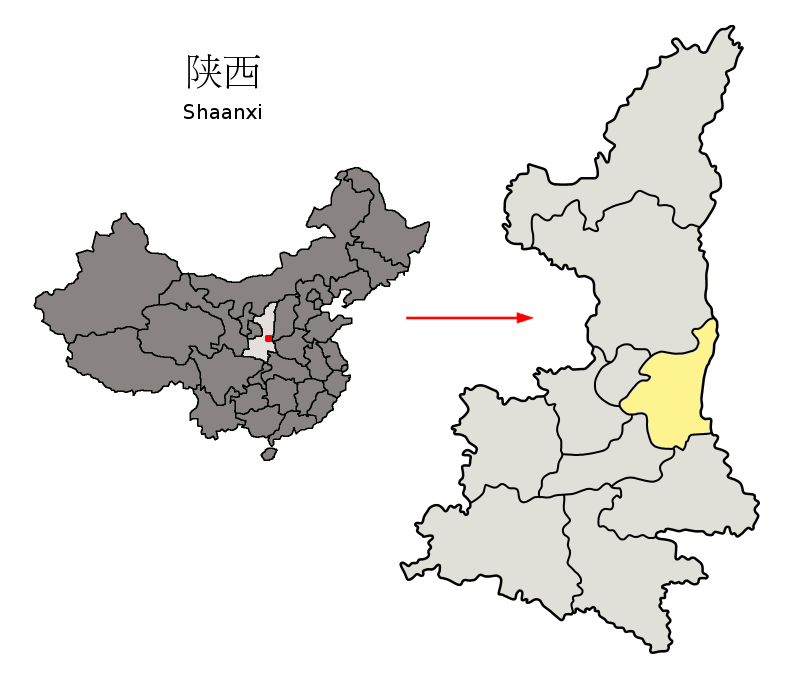
- Weinan in Shaanxi
- Coordinates (Fuping government): 34°45′06″N 109°10′48″E
- Country: People's Republic of China
- Province: Shaanxi
- Prefecture-level city: Weinan

Area
  - Total: 1,242 km^{2} (480 sq mi)

Population (2018)
  - Total: 750,300
  - Density: 604.1/km^{2} (1,565/sq mi)
- Time zone: UTC+8 (China Standard)
- Postal code: 711700

Fuping County (Chinese: 富平县; pinyin: Fùpíng Xiàn) is a county located in the center of Shaanxi Province, China. It is the westernmost county-level division of the prefecture-level city of Weinan.

The Fuping County has an area of 1,233 km^{2} (476 sq mi) and a population of 750,000. Its postal code is 711700. It comprises 24 towns, 337 administrative villages.

A particular breed of persimmons originating from the area, the Fuping persimmon (富平尖柿, literally translated to Fuping pointy-tipped persimmon), is named after this place. It is a type of astringent persimmon of the species Diospyros kaki. When dried, it is highly coveted domestically.

Xi Jinping, the General Secretary of the Chinese Communist Party, traces his ancestry here. His father, former Vice-Premier Xi Zhongxun was from here.

== Administrative divisions ==
As of 2019, Fuping County is divided to 1 subdistrict and 14 towns.

Subdistricts

- Chengguan Subdistrict (城关街道)

Towns

- Zhuangli (庄里镇)
- Zhangqiao (张桥镇)
- Meiyuan (美原镇)
- Liuqu (流曲镇)
- Dancun (淡村镇)
- Liugu (留古镇)
- Laomiao (老庙镇)
- Xue (薛镇)
- Daoxian (到贤镇)
- Caocun (曹村镇)
- Gongli (宫里镇)
- Meijiaping (梅家坪镇)
- Liuji (刘集镇)
- Qicun (齐村镇)

== Climate ==
Climate data for Fuping, elevation 827 m (2,713 ft), (1991–2020 normals, extremes 1981–2010)
Month	Jan	Feb	Mar	Apr	May	Jun	Jul	Aug	Sep	Oct	Nov	Dec	Year
Record high °C (°F)	17.5 (63.5)	22.9 (73.2)	27.3 (81.1)	31.5 (88.7)	36.0 (96.8)	42.2 (108.0)	41.9 (107.4)	40.2 (104.4)	37.9 (100.2)	31.0 (87.8)	22.5 (72.5)	17.5 (63.5)	42.2 (108.0)
Mean daily maximum °C (°F)	8.2 (46.8)	9.9 (49.8)	14.6 (58.3)	17.9 (64.2)	21.9 (71.4)	24.9 (76.8)	27.1 (80.8)	26.9 (80.4)	22.7 (72.9)	17.5 (63.5)	11.8 (53.2)	8.5 (47.3)	17.7 (63.8)
Daily mean °C (°F)	5.4 (41.7)	6.3 (43.3)	9.9 (49.8)	12.7 (54.9)	16.3 (61.3)	19.4 (66.9)	21.6 (70.9)	21.3 (70.3)	17.5 (63.5)	13.5 (56.3)	8.9 (48.0)	6.0 (42.8)	13.2 (55.8)
Mean daily minimum °C (°F)	3.1 (37.6)	3.5 (38.3)	5.6 (42.1)	8.0 (46.4)	11.3 (52.3)	14.4 (57.9)	16.6 (61.9)	16.4 (61.5)	12.7 (54.9)	9.9 (49.8)	6.4 (43.5)	4.0 (39.2)	9.3 (48.8)
Record low °C (°F)	−12.8 (9.0)	−10.6 (12.9)	−6.2 (20.8)	−2.0 (28.4)	3.4 (38.1)	7.1 (44.8)	8.7 (47.7)	8.6 (47.5)	5.0 (41.0)	−1.0 (30.2)	−6.3 (20.7)	−9.1 (15.6)	−12.8 (9.0)
Average precipitation mm (inches)	52.9 (2.08)	43.3 (1.70)	48.0 (1.89)	49.4 (1.94)	64.1 (2.52)	53.2 (2.09)	58.9 (2.32)	51.0 (2.01)	48.1 (1.89)	60.8 (2.39)	51.9 (2.04)	58.4 (2.30)	640.0 (25.20)
Average precipitation days (≥ 0.1 mm)	10.4	11.4	9.9	8.6	9.2	8.3	7.4	8.1	7.5	8.5	9.4	9.6	108.3
Average snowy days	3.8	2.8	1.2	0.1	0	0	0	0	0	0	1.3	2.8	12
Average relative humidity (%)	83	80	76	76	72	71	70	71	77	83	86	86	77
Mean monthly sunshine hours	74.9	62.2	63.8	104.0	164.6	159.5	192.2	191.6	192.3	191.0	150.1	120.4	1,666.6
Percentage possible sunshine	29	26	22	27	40	40	47	48	53	53	45	36	39
Source: China Meteorological Administration
