= Xie Shaoming =

Chinese politician (1925–2024)

Xie Shaoming (January 25, 1925 - July 8, 2024, Chinese: 谢绍明), was born in Zichang, Shaanxi, a Chinese politician. He was the son of General Xie Zichang (Chinese: 谢子长).

== Biography ==
In the spring of 1937, Xie became a member of the Chinese Communist Party (CCP) in January 1939. In Chifeng City, Jehol Province, Xie held a variety of leadership positions from 1945 to 1948, including the positions of political commissar and secretary of the district committee of the People's Liberation Army.

As secretary of the Organization Department of the Chinese Communist Party for the Northeast Bureau, deputy director of Harbin State-owned Factory 120, chief engineer and director of Shenyang State-owned Factory 119, and director of the Production Bureau under the Eighth Ministry of Machinery Industry, Xie assumed a series of significant responsibilities between 1950 and 1981. He served in a variety of senior roles at the State Science and Technology Commission from 1981 to 1988, including Director of the Third Bureau, Director of the Science and Technology Administration Bureau, Director of the Discipline Inspection Group at the Central Commission for Discipline Inspection. He was appointed the Invited Advisor of the State Science and Technology Commission in 1988, and he formally retired in March 1999.

On July 8, 2024, in Beijing, Xie Shaoming died at the age of 99.
