= Yetaishan Campaign =

1945 military campaign

- Part of the Chinese Civil War
Date	July 21 – August 9, 1945
Location	Shaanxi, China
Result	Communist victory

Belligerents
National Revolutionary Army	Eighth Route Army

Commanders and leaders
Hu Zongnan	Zhang Zongxun; Xi Zhongxun

Strength
20,000	6,000

Casualties and losses
500+	200+

The Yetaishan Campaign (爷台山战役), also known as the Chunhua Incident (淳化事变) by the nationalists and dubbed the Yetaishan Counteroffensive (爷台山反击战) by the communists, was a series of battles fought between the nationalists and the communists during Chinese Civil War shortly before the end of World War II, and resulted in the communist victory.

== Order of battle ==
Nationalists (totaling around 20,000):

- 2nd Cavalry Division
- Temporarily Organized 59th Division
- 3rd Reserve Division

Communists (around 6,000):

- 3rd Regiment of the 1st Garrison Brigade
- 2 regiments of the New 4th Brigade
- 2 regiments of the 1st Training Brigade
- 2 regiments of the 2nd Training Brigade
- 8th Regiment of the 358th Brigade

== First stage ==
Yetai Mountain (Yetai Shan, 爷台山) located at the southern tip of the Qiao (乔) Mountain Range at the border of Chunhau (淳化) and Yao (耀) Counties was the southern gate of the Communist base in Shaanxi, and its main peak was 1,300 meters above sea level. Beginning on 15 July 1945, Hu Zongnan redeployed his forces in Henan, Xi'an, along the Yellow River westward to part of Xunyi (旬邑), Tongguan (同官), Chunhau (淳化) and Yao (耀) Counties, reaching a total of nine divisions. On 21 July 1945, the nationalist 2nd Cavalry and Temporarily Organized 59th Divisions suddenly launched a surprise attack on this strategic location, as a probe attack to discover the weakness of the Communist defense, as well as the reaction of Communists and the general public. On 23 July 1945, the nationalist 3rd Reserve Division also joined the attack on the enemy. After a series of small but fierce battles that continuously lasted a week, the numerically and technically inferior local Communist garrison withdrew on 27 July 1945 into the heart of their base in Shaanxi, and the nationalists succeeded in taking control of the mountain and 41 hamlets to the west of the mountain.

The Communists organized a temporary headquarters for counteroffensive at Horse Fence (Malan, 马栏). Zhang Zongxun was appointed as the commander-in-chief, Wang Shitai (王世泰) and Wang Jishan (王近山) as the deputy commanders-in-chief, Xi Zhongxun as the political commissar, Tan Zheng (谭政) as the deputy political commissar, and Zhang Jingwu (张经武) as the chief-of-staff, and Gan Siqi as the director of the political directorate. A total of eight regiments of Communist New 4th Brigade, 358th Brigade, 1st and 2nd Training Brigades and 1st Garrison Brigade were deployed to counterattack.

== Second stage ==
The harsh conditions of the local area could not support three mechanized divisions, and most of the nationalist force had to withdraw in order to avoid the logistic nightmare, and the main force had to be deployed in other regions, including Bin (邠), Zhongbu (中部), Shibao (石堡), Xingping (兴平), Chunhau (淳化) and Yao (耀) Counties and Xi'an. Only six companies were left behind to guard the newly conquered territory, including two heavy machine gun companies, and four infantry companies, with the crack troop nicknamed the "Ever Victorious Company", the 4th Company of the 2nd Battalion of the 3rd Regiment of the nationalist 59th Temporary Organized Division guarding the main peak of the Yetai Mountain (Yetai Shan, 爷台山). To strengthen their positions, seven additional machine guns were assigned to the "Ever Victorious Company". The nationalists also drafted most of the local population to build over a dozen bunkers interconnected by trenches to fortify their positions.

Communists were determined to dislodge the nationalists from their positions. Five battalions of the Communist New 4th Brigade and a mountain gun crew were assigned as the main force of the first attack wave, and they were to be helped by the 1st and 3rd Garrison Regiments of the Communist 1st Garrison Brigade. They were tasked to annihilate nationalists in the regions of Yetai Mountain (Yetai Shan, 爷台山), Laozhuangzi (老庄子), and Song Family's Pit (Songjiawa, 宋家洼). The 358th Brigade was the second wave deployed in the region of Phoenix Mountain (Fenghuanshan, 凤凰山) and Zhaojin (照金), and join the fight if necessary, but its main tasks was to prepare for the possible nationalist counterattack that would certainly follow. The 1st and 2nd Training Brigade deployed in the region of Ridge Gulf (Lingwan, 岭湾) and Shangzhenzi (上珍子) as general reserve were tasked to protect the rear. After the Communist force regrouped at the region of Horse Fence (Malan, 马栏), they set out on 7 August 1945 and the communist temporary headquarters was also moved forward from Horse Fence (Malan, 马栏) to Mianlu (免鹿) Hamlet at the foothill of Phoenix Mountain (Fenghuanshan, 凤凰山), 10 km away from Yetai Mountain (Yetai Shan, 爷台山).

== Third stage ==
At the dusk of 8 August 1945, Communists secretly approached the nationalist positions and dug in. At midnight, the attack begun, but their advance was checked by the stubborn nationalist defense. By 4:00 AM of 9 August 1945, only the 771st Regiment of the New 4th Brigade succeeded in taking nationalist positions at Meng Household's Plain, (Menghuyuan, 孟户原) and Xionng Family's Mountain (Xiongjiashan, 熊家山), while other communist attacks were beaten back. The communist headquarters consequently ordered the 358th Brigade to join the fight, and the 8th Regiment of the 358th Brigade was ordered by its brigade commander Huang Xinting (黄新廷) to launch another round of attack on the nationalists, under the cover of the artillery barrage of three mountain guns and eight mortars, the entire artillery pieces of the brigade.

By 10:00 AM on 9 August 1945, the 6th Company of the 2nd Battalion of the 8th Regiment of the Communist 358th Brigade succeeded in taking all trenches outside the bunkers occupied by the nationalists, and a Communist soldier named Yin Yufen (尹玉芬) first breached the first nationalist bunker, and soon after, other units of the 2nd Battalion of the 8th Regiment of the Communist 358th Brigade and 1st Battalion of the 16th Regiment of the New 4th Brigade also succeeded in breaching the nationalist defense, finally taking the remaining nationalist positions at Yetai Mountain (Yetai Shan, 爷台山) by 2:00 PM. After the main battle ended, the 3rd Battalion of the 8th Regiment of the Communist 358th Brigade and the 3rd Garrison Regiment succeeded in taking the last five bunkers in the region of Laozhuangzi (老庄子), and Songjiawa (宋家洼), and the five nationalists companies left to guard the region were completely destroyed and Communist took a defensive posture to prepare for possible nationalist counterattacks.

== Conclusion ==
After concluding the nationalists would not launch anymore counterattacks, the Communist finally declared a victory on 10 August 1945. The Communist succeeded in retake all of the territories previously lost by destroying all of the six nationalist companies stationed there, succeeding in capturing over a hundred nationalist enlisted, thirty-six nationalist officers (including a battalion commander), while killing most of the remaining nationalist troops. A total of nineteen machine guns and huge amount of ammunition also fell into Communist hands. The conflict was used by the Communists as a mean to evaluate the training of their troops, especially the 358th Brigade.

The nationalists not only learned that the rugged mountainous terrain favored the enemy defenders but ill-suited for the mechanized force of their own, but was also worrying the political fallout of alienating the general public for launching an attack on the Communists instead of the Japanese invaders. Furthermore, the American investigation team (accompanied by Yang Shangkun, with Huang Hua and Ma Haide (George Hatem) as interpreters) visited the site on 12 August 1945 concluded that the nationalists were at fault, which agreed with the perception of the general public, and losing US support was simply a risk the nationalists could not afford to take. The nationalists therefore decided not to attempt a retake of the region, and the campaign concluded as both sides turned their attention to capturing more territories from the Japanese invaders.

== See also ==
- Outline of the Chinese Civil War
- National Revolutionary Army
- History of the People's Liberation Army
