= Liu Zhidan (novel) =

1961 novel resulting in political dispute in the CPC

The biographical novel Liu Zhidan depicts the life of Liu Zhidan, an early leader of the Chinese Communist Party (CCP). Its publication resulted in political controversy within party leadership, with some viewing it as evidence of an anti-party clique. These political disputes involved the roles of those who had been in the Northwest during the Chinese revolution and those who were in the Party center.

== Background ==
Liu Zhidan was a leader of the Chinese Communist Party (CCP) who founded the revolutionary base area that later developed into the Yan'an Soviet. He was killed in battle in 1936 and regarded as a hero and martyr of the CCP. In 1956, the Workers' Publishing House asked Li Jiantong, the wife of Liu Zhidan's younger brother Liu Jingfan to write a novel about Liu. She did so. Kang Sheng opposed its publication.

== Novel's impact ==
The fall of Gao Gang after the Gao Gang Affair had created a political opening for those in the CCP who opposed decisions on party history made during the Yan'an era. Gao's political opponents, such as Yan Hongyan, viewed the novel as a threat. Among the contentions by opponents of the novel was that it sought to posthumously rehabilitate the reputation of Gao, that it plagiarized Mao Zedong Thought, that it misappropriated Mao's contributions to the revolution, and that Xi Zhongxun sought to use it to accumulate political influence and usurp the power of others.

On 28 July 1961, excerpts of the novel were published in People's Daily.

On 24 August, Kang Sheng wrote a letter demanding investigation into the novel, stating, "This is not simply an issue of a cultural written product" and that it seemed "that this as a political direction." Kang contended that Xi Zhongxun, who had been involved in reviewing the novel, was trying to use it to reverse the political judgment on Gao Gang.

Some in Chinese leadership viewed the novel as evidence of an anti-party clique. At the Tenth Plenary of the CCP's 8th National Congress, Mao Zedong stated, "The use of novels for anti-party activity is quite a great invention ... Anyone wanting to overthrow a political regime must create public opinion and do some preparatory ideological work. This applies to counter-revolutionary as well as to the revolutionary classes."

Among those targeted in the controversy about the novel was Xi. As part of an investigation into Xi, Kang stated that investigators must look for evidence that the novel propagated the ideas that during the Chinese Civil War, "the Northwest had saved the party center" and that "Gao Gang was the king of the Northwest" and that it promoted Xi as Gao's "heir." As part of a self-criticism which he later wrote under pressure, Xi stated that this primary motive had been to use the novel "to make the Shaan-Gan-Ning Border Region the orthodoxy of the Revolution."

Criticisms of the novel and Xi expanded over the course of the next few years into broader criticisms of those who had been Northwest cadres by their current political opponents within the Party. Twenty thousand people were ultimately persecuted based on the idea that they had been part of a "Xi Zhongxun anti-party clique."

The novel continued to be an obstacle for Xi's political rehabilitation as late as 1977.

In July 1979, the Organization Department determined that the novel had not been part of an anti-party conspiracy. In February 1980, the alleged "Xi Zhongxun anti-party clique" was declared to have been, in fact, non-existent.

The novel was banned in China for a period in the 1980s and again in 2009.
