= White Terror (China) =

Political repression by the Chinese Nationalists (1927–1930s)

- Part of Nanjing decade, Chinese Civil War, Chinese Communist Revolution
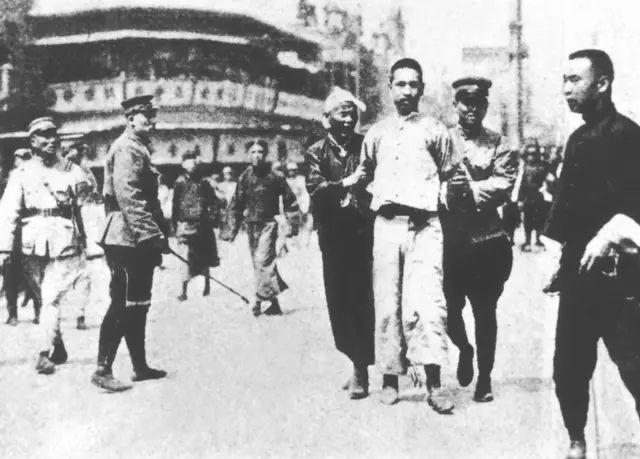
- A communist being arrested in the Shanghai massacre (1927)
- Location: Republic of China
- Date: 1927–1930s
- Target: Chinese Communist Party, opposition, progressive dissidents
- Deaths: 100,000 - 1,000,000
- Perpetrator: Nationalist government
- Motive: Collapse of KMT–CCP alliance; Political consolidation of the Nationalist government; Ideological polarization; Civil war escalation and state instability

The White Terror was an anti-communist political repression campaign by the Nationalist government in the Republic of China which began with the Shanghai massacre in April 1927 and continued through the early 1930s. Through the White Terror, the Nationalists and their allies targeted the Chinese Communist Party (CCP), trade unionists, peasants, and women whom they deemed progressive. Estimates of those killed range from the hundreds of thousands to more than one million.

The Nationalists' White Terror ended the First United Front between the Nationalists and the CCP and nearly wiped out the CCP.

== History ==
In 1927, Chiang Kai-shek and the Nationalists had developed sufficient military power such that Chiang believed the Nationalists no longer needed the support of the Chinese Communist Party (CCP) and other revolutionary mass movements.

The White Terror began with the Shanghai massacre by the Nationalists. In March 1927, a CCP-led workers movement gained control of parts of Shanghai. Chiang and the Nationalist Army were welcomed into the city later that month. Breaking the First United Front, in April 1927, regular units of the Nationalist Army allied with criminal triad organizations such as the Green Gang began massacring CCP members, trade unionists, and others they contended were radical.

From 1927 to 1930, the White Terror killed from the hundreds of thousands to more than one million people. Women with short hair and natural (unbound) feet were presumed to be radical and became a specific target of the White Terror; Nationalist forces would often mutilate and display their corpses in an effort to cow people.

The CCP was nearly wiped out. Its membership of 58,000 at the beginning of 1927 was reduced less than 10,000 by the year end. Most of these lost members were killed in battle or summarily executed by the Nationalists; some also defected. Surviving members dispersed into rural China; perceiving the defeat of the urban proletariat, they attempted to reorganize in what Mao Zedong termed "revolutionary base areas" to wage a "people's war" against the Nationalist government, with a focus on the peasantry as the revolutionary class.

=== Impact by region ===
After the Nationalists began the White Terror in Shanghai, they expanded the repression campaign south of the Yangtze and also into warlord areas not previously under Nationalist control.

==== Shaanxi ====
In early July 1927, Feng Yuxiang allied with Chiang to form a new government in Shaanxi and implemented the White Terror there. The Nationalist crackdown included a focus on eliminating the CCP presence in schools. By September 1927, they had killed 496 people including students. The CCP ordered its Shaanxi Provincial Committee to respond with peasant revolts. These early responses failed and in March 1928 the Weihua Uprising began. The Weihua Uprising was defeated in June 1928.

==== Shanghai ====
In Shanghai, the CCP and the local worker's movement were almost completely destroyed by the Shanghai massacre.

Among the victims of the White Terror in Shanghai were the "Five Martyrs of the Left League", members of the League of Left-Wing Writers who were arrested in 1931 at a meeting along with nineteen other CCP members and sympathizers and then executed. International communist publications cited their execution of as evidence of the KMT's willingness to censor through killing writers.

==== Wuhan ====
Among the victims of the White Terror in Wuhan was Xiang Jingyu, one of the earliest female CCP leaders.

== See also ==
- Anti-communism in China
- Anti-communist mass killings
- List of massacres in China
- Outline of the Chinese Civil War
- White Terror (Taiwan)
