= Li Jiantong =

Chinese writer and politician

Li Jiantong (March 26, 1919 – February 14, 2005), whose original name was Han Yuzhi and pen names were Qiu Xin and Qiu Yin, was a Chinese writer and politician from Xuchang, Henan Province. She served as the Director and Inspector of the Ministry of Supervision of the State Council and the Chinese Communist Party Deputy Committee Secretary of the Chinese Academy of Geological Sciences.

During the Cultural Revolution, her novel Liu Zhidan sparked a political controversy, leading to her and her family being persecuted.

Chinese musician and composer Liu Sola is her daughter.

== See also ==
- Liu Zhidan (novel)
