= Second encirclement campaign against the Shaanxi–Gansu Soviet =

- Part of the Chinese Civil War
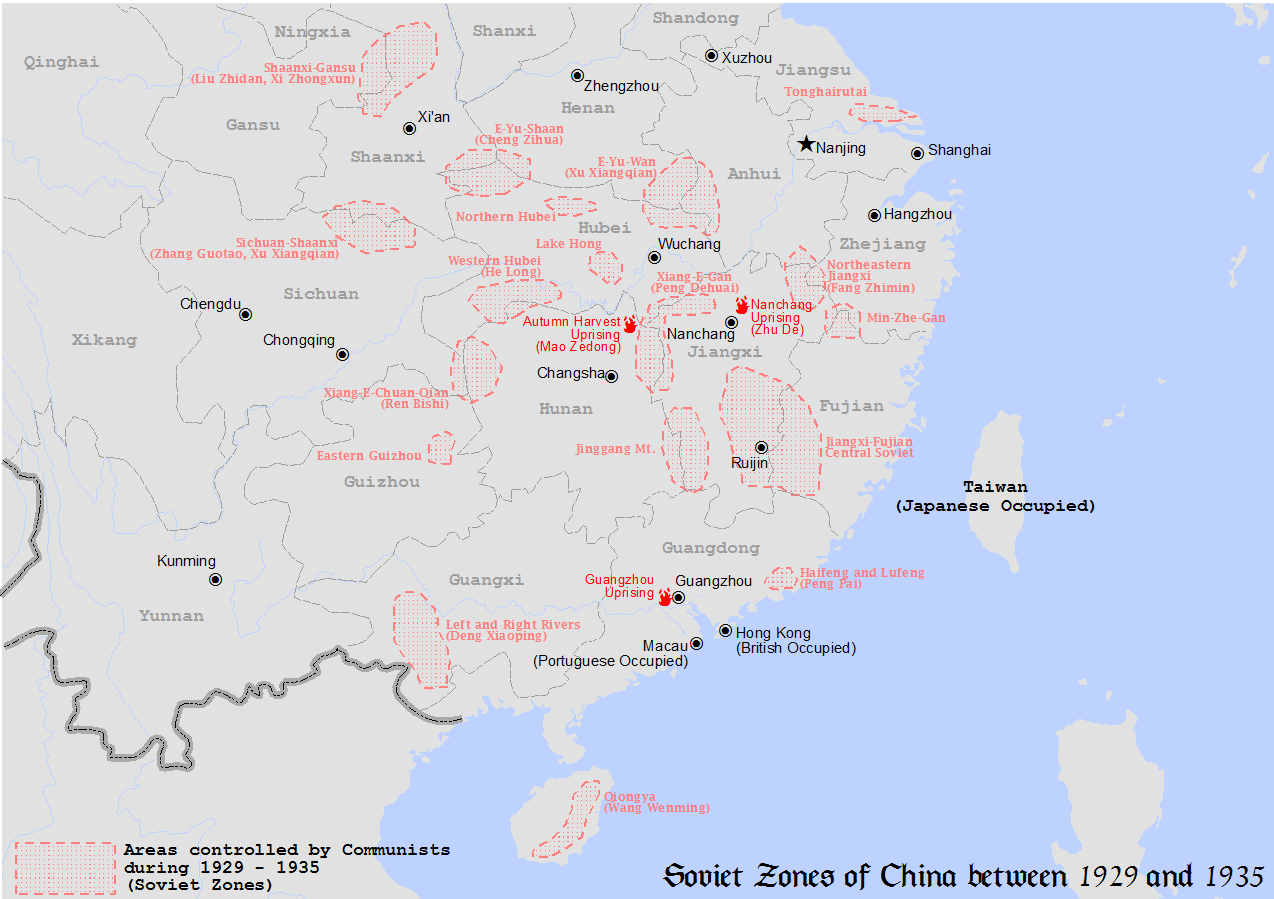
- Location of Shaanxi–Gansu Soviet
Date	April, 1935 – July, 1935
Location	Shaanxi and Gansu, China
Result	Communist victory

Belligerents
Nationalist China	Chinese Red Army

Commanders and leaders
Chiang Kai-shek	Liu Zhidan; Gao Gang

Strength
40,000+	14,000

Casualties and losses
3,000+	?

The second encirclement campaign against the Shaanxi–Gansu Soviet was an encirclement campaign launched by the Chinese Nationalist government that was intended to destroy the Communist Shaanxi–Gansu Soviet and its Chinese Red Army in the local region. It was responded by the Communists' second counter-encirclement campaign at Shaanxi–Gansu Soviet (Chinese: 陕甘苏区第二次反围剿), also called by the Communists as the second counter-encirclement campaign at Shaanxi–Gansu Revolutionary Base (Chinese: 陕甘革命根据地第二次反围剿), in which the local Chinese Red Army successfully defended their soviet republic in the border region of Shaanxi and Gansu provinces against the Nationalist attacks from April 1935 to July 1935.

Beginning in October, 1934, Chiang Kai-shek mobilized more than 40,000 troops of warlords of Shaanxi, Shanxi, Ningxia, and Gansu to launch the second encirclement campaign against Shaanxi–Gansu Soviet aimed to eradicate the local Communists. However, the Nationalist plan had multiple drawbacks; none of the warlords were willing to sacrifice their own troops and a unified command could not be formed because all were afraid of that the one in charge would sacrifice others. As a result, Chiang Kai-shek at the distant south, hundreds or even thousands miles away, had to take the command, and due to other affairs that needed to be taken care of, as well as the warlord's lack of enthusiasm and cooperation, Chiang was unable to command effectively. It would take half a year since the first mobilization for the Nationalists to finally launch their first assault and the disconnection between the battlefields of the Nationalist high command had also prevented any timely decision to be made in real time, which would lead to the failure of the campaign.

In contrast, the Communists adopted the strategy by concentrating their forces and fought in northern Shaanxi under a unified command. After the 42nd Division and the 84th Division of the Chinese Red Army had met up in Anding (安定) county, a unified command was formed under the name of Chinese Workers' and Peasants' Red Army Northwestern Military Committee Frontline Command. Liu Zhidan (刘志丹) was named as the commander-in-chief while Gao Gang was named as the political commissar.

In late April 1935, the Nationalists finally begun their uncoordinated and disorganized attacks, which were easily defeated by the Communists. After more than two months of fighting, Nationalists not only failed their original objective, but also lost half a dozen towns including Anding (安定), Yanchang (延长), Yanchuan (延川), Ansai (安塞), Jingbian (靖边), and Bao'an. After suffering more than 3,000 casualties, the warlords called off the any further military operations, and the campaign resulted in Communist victory. As a result of their victory, the previous two separate communist bases of the Shaanxi–Gansu Soviet, the one at the border region of Shaanxi and Gansu and the other in northern Shaanxi had been linked up to become a new one with larger size.

== See also ==
- Outline of the Chinese Civil War
- National Revolutionary Army
- History of the People's Liberation Army
