= Weihua Uprising =

Communist uprising in 1928

- Part of the Chinese Civil War
Date	March – June 1928
Location	Weinan, Shaanxi, China
Result	Nationalist victory: Uprising suppressed; Liu Zhidan escaped to northern Shaanxi

Belligerents
Republic of China: Kuomintang; Guominjun	Chinese Communist Party: National People's Army of the Northwest

Commanders and leaders
Song Zheyuan	Liu Zhidan; Tang Shu †; Li Dade (executed)

Strength
Unknown	Several thousand

Casualties and losses
Unknown	300 executions (executed)

The Weihua Uprising was a Chinese Communist Party insurgency during the Chinese Civil War. Responding to the White Terror implemented by Feng Yuxiang, the Weihua Uprising began in March 1928. The uprising was led by Liu Zhidan. It was defeated by Song Zheyuan in June 1928.

== History ==
In early July 1927, Feng Yuxiang allied with Chiang to form a new government in Shaanxi and implemented the White Terror there. The Nationalist crackdown included a focus on eliminating Chinese Communist Party (CCP) presence in schools. By September 1927, they had killed 496 people including students. The CCP ordered its Shaanxi Provincial Committee to respond with peasant revolts. These early responses failed and in March 1928 the Weihua Uprising began.

Liu Zhidan led the Weihua Uprising (in modern Weinan) with several thousand men and established the National People's Army of the Northwest.

As part of the Nationalist response to the Weihua Uprising, Nationalist forces mass arrested CCP members and students. Nationalist forces executed members of the Communist Youth League, including 62 Youth League members in a single county.

In June 1928, Song Zheyuan defeated the uprising and Liu fled to northern Shaanxi.

== See also ==
- Chinese Communist Revolution
- Outline of the Chinese Civil War
