= Ganquan County =

Ganquan 甘泉县 Kanchuan
- County
- Ganquan in Yan'an

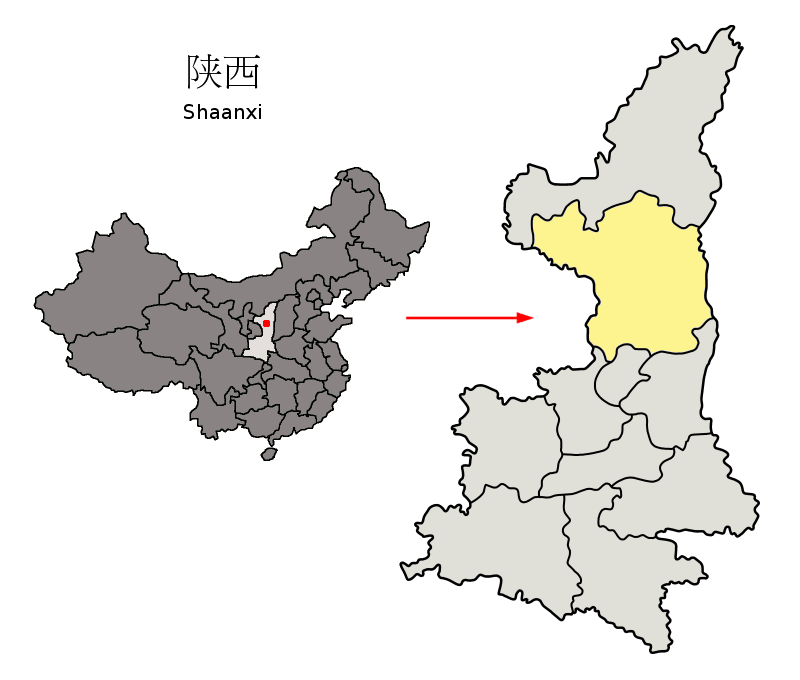
- Yan'an in Shaanxi
- Coordinates (Ganquan County government): 36°16′36″N 109°21′05″E
- Country: People's Republic of China
- Province: Shaanxi
- Prefecture-level city: Yan'an

Area
  - Total: 2,276.1 km^{2} (878.8 sq mi)

Population
  - Total: 77,800
  - Density: 34.2/km^{2} (88.5/sq mi)
- Time zone: UTC+8 (China standard time)
- Postal code: 716100
- Division code: GQN
- Licence plates: 陕J

Ganquan County (simplified Chinese: 甘泉县; traditional Chinese: 甘泉縣; pinyin: Gānquán Xiàn) is a county in the north of Shaanxi province, China. It is under the administration of the prefecture-level city of Yan'an. The county has an area of 2,276.1 square kilometres (878.8 mi^{2}), and a population of 77,800 as of 2012.

== Administrative divisions ==
The county is divided into 1 subdistrict, 3 towns, and 2 townships. The county's administrative offices are located in its sole subdistrict, Meishui Subdistrict. The county's three towns are Xiasiwan, Dao, and Shimen. The county's two townships are Qiaozhen Township and Laoshan Township.

== Geography ==
The county is located in the hilly Loess Plateau in Northern Shaanxi.

=== Climate ===
The county has an average annual temperature of 8.6 °C (47.5 °F), and an average annual precipitation of 571.2 millimetres (22.49 in).

Climate data for Ganquan, elevation 1,006 m (3,301 ft), (1991–2020 normals, extremes 1981–2010)
Month	Jan	Feb	Mar	Apr	May	Jun	Jul	Aug	Sep	Oct	Nov	Dec	Year
Record high °C (°F)	16.0 (60.8)	22.8 (73.0)	30.0 (86.0)	35.0 (95.0)	36.4 (97.5)	38.8 (101.8)	37.2 (99.0)	35.7 (96.3)	37.1 (98.8)	29.0 (84.2)	25.3 (77.5)	17.9 (64.2)	38.8 (101.8)
Mean daily maximum °C (°F)	3.3 (37.9)	7.5 (45.5)	13.8 (56.8)	20.9 (69.6)	25.2 (77.4)	29.0 (84.2)	29.8 (85.6)	28.0 (82.4)	23.2 (73.8)	17.7 (63.9)	11.1 (52.0)	4.7 (40.5)	17.8 (64.1)
Daily mean °C (°F)	−5.7 (21.7)	−1.2 (29.8)	5.1 (41.2)	11.9 (53.4)	16.6 (61.9)	20.7 (69.3)	22.7 (72.9)	21.2 (70.2)	16.1 (61.0)	9.5 (49.1)	2.4 (36.3)	−4.1 (24.6)	9.6 (49.3)
Mean daily minimum °C (°F)	−12.0 (10.4)	−7.5 (18.5)	−1.8 (28.8)	4.1 (39.4)	8.9 (48.0)	13.7 (56.7)	17.3 (63.1)	16.5 (61.7)	11.4 (52.5)	4.1 (39.4)	−3.2 (26.2)	−10.0 (14.0)	3.5 (38.2)
Record low °C (°F)	−24.8 (−12.6)	−20.5 (−4.9)	−18.7 (−1.7)	−7.3 (18.9)	−3.8 (25.2)	3.2 (37.8)	7.4 (45.3)	6.3 (43.3)	−1.4 (29.5)	−11.4 (11.5)	−18.9 (−2.0)	−27.1 (−16.8)	−27.1 (−16.8)
Average precipitation mm (inches)	4.2 (0.17)	6.9 (0.27)	14.2 (0.56)	28.3 (1.11)	45.5 (1.79)	66.7 (2.63)	123.7 (4.87)	114.5 (4.51)	76.9 (3.03)	40.5 (1.59)	15.2 (0.60)	2.9 (0.11)	539.5 (21.24)
Average precipitation days (≥ 0.1 mm)	2.6	3.5	4.9	6.1	8.4	9.5	13.2	12.9	11.5	9.2	4.5	2.0	88.3
Average snowy days	4.2	4.8	2.9	0.4	0	0	0	0	0	0.2	2.5	3.6	18.6
Average relative humidity (%)	58	56	53	51	57	63	74	77	78	73	66	60	64
Mean monthly sunshine hours	188.6	175.6	204.8	221.2	238.8	225.2	202.9	183.5	153.6	167.6	171.4	184.9	2,318.1
Percentage possible sunshine	61	57	55	56	55	52	46	44	42	49	56	62	53
Source: China Meteorological Administration

== Economy ==
In 2013, Ganquan County reported a GDP of 2.13 billion Renminbi, which had fallen 2.058 billion by 2016 due to decreased oil production. Despite this, the county's residents experienced an increase in average annual disposable income during this time, with urban residents' income rising from 25,835 Renminbi to 29,419, and agrarian residents' income rising from 8,642 Renminbi to 10,462.

=== Agriculture ===
The county has a sizable agriculture sector, producing 40,000 tons of grain and 122,000 tons of vegetables as of 2013. The county government reported 125,000 lives pigs and 2.25 million live heads of poultry in the county the same year. Some of the county's food products have gained recognition throughout China, namely Ganquan dried tofu (甘泉豆腐干), Meishui wine (美水酒), Fangxin cabbage (放心菜), and Laoshan eggs (劳山土鸡蛋).

=== Natural resources ===
Ganquan County is home to a number of natural resources, such as coal, petroleum, natural gas, limestone, gold, silver, copper, and iron. The county has an oil production plant located in Xiasiwan, which employs over 2,500 workers. In 2013, the county produced 365,000 tons of oil, adding 779 million Renminbi to the economy, which accounted for 36.58% of Ganquan's GDP. The county's petroleum reserves total 110.678 billion tons, and the county's natural gas reserves total 20 billion cubic meters.

== Transportation ==
=== Roadways ===
- China National Highway 210
- G65 Baomao Expressway

=== Railways ===
- Xi'an–Yan'an Railway
- Baotou–Xi'an railway
