= Zhejiang =

Province of China

Zhejiang 浙江 Chekiang
- Province

Name transcription(s)
  - Chinese: 浙江省 (Zhèjiāng Shěng)
  - Abbreviation: ZJ / 浙 (pinyin: Zhè)
  - Wu (Wugniu): tseq-cian sen (Hangzhounese) ciq-kaon san (Ningbonese) tsei-kuao siae (Wenzhounese)
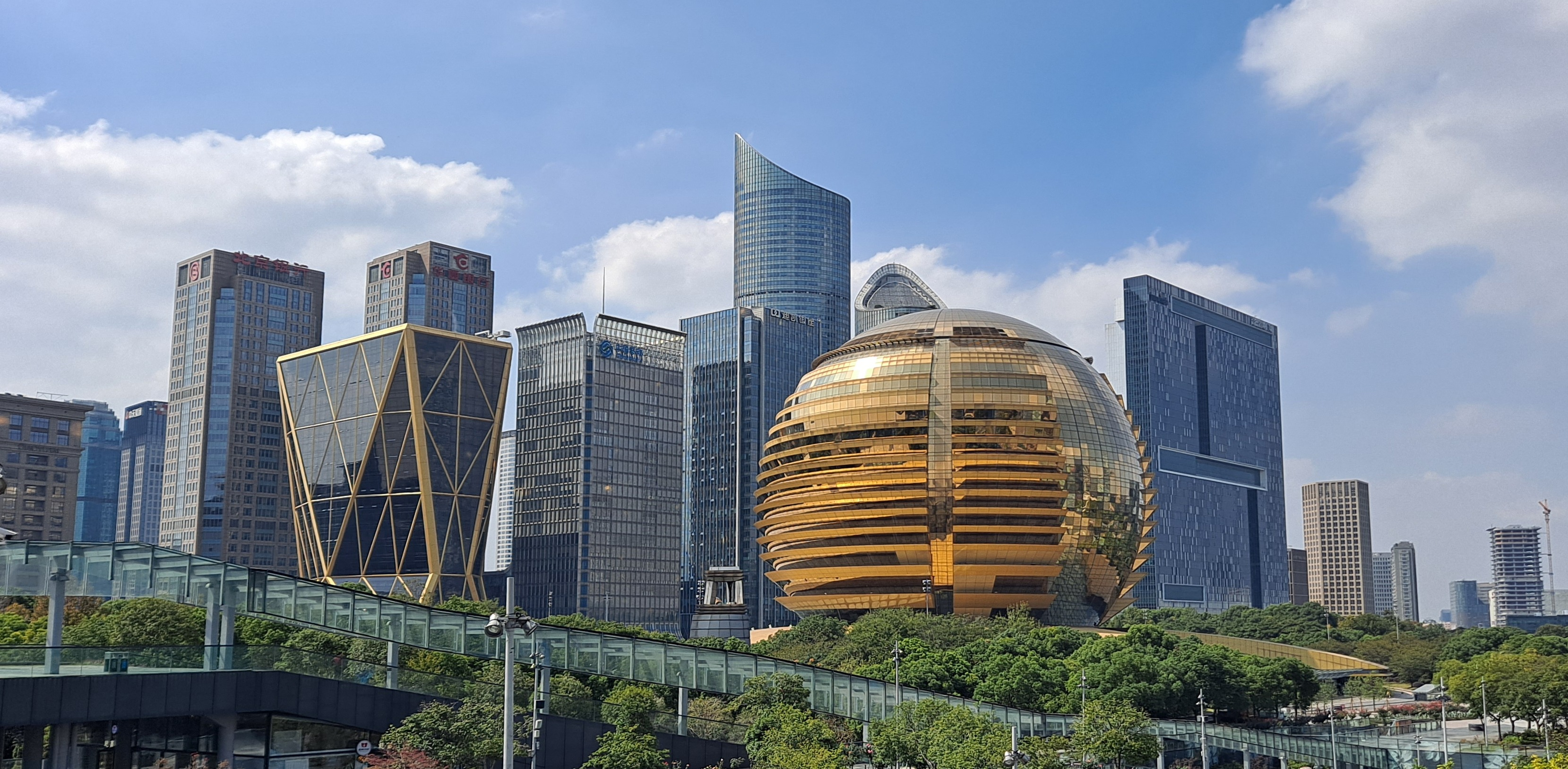
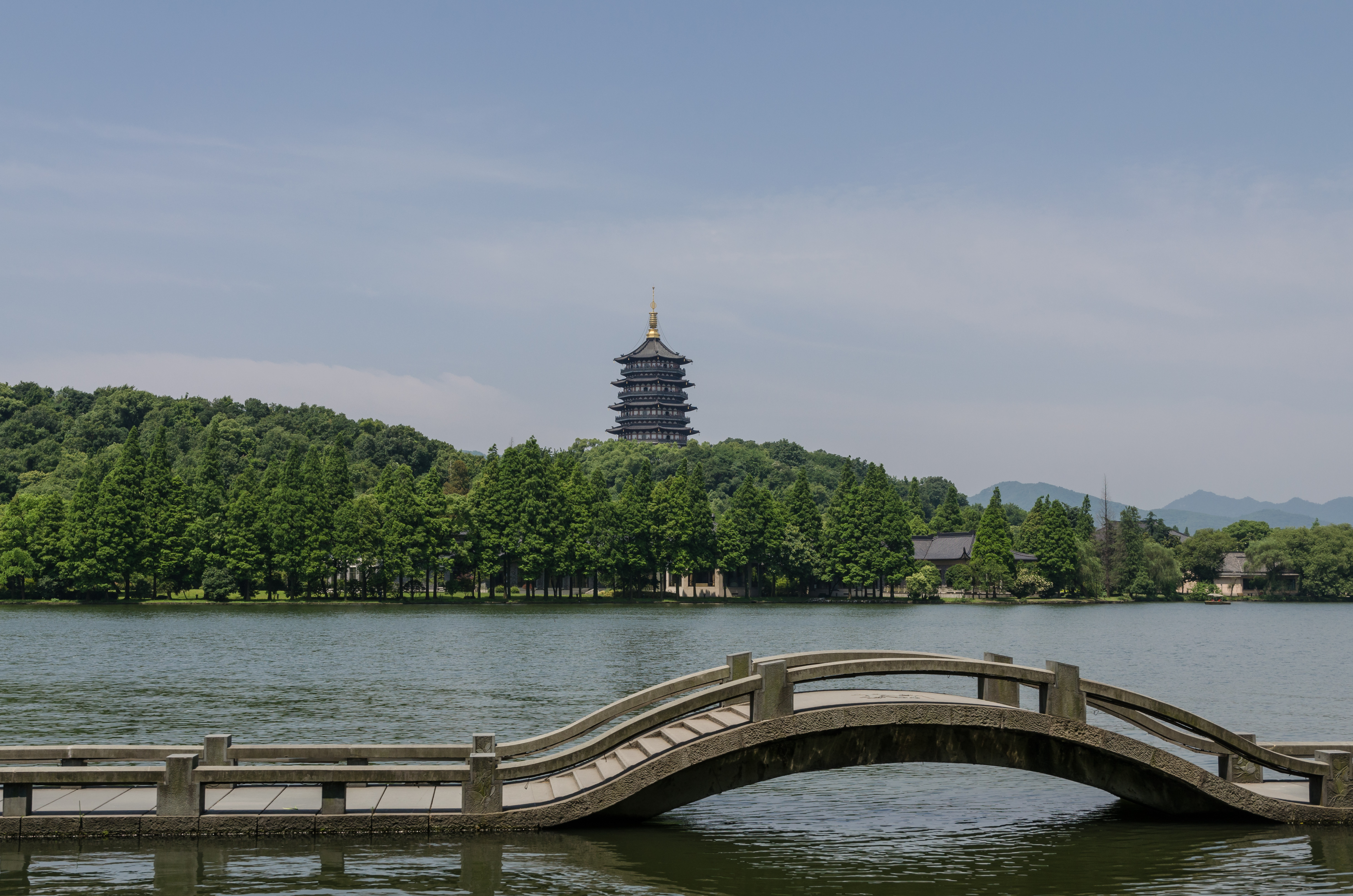
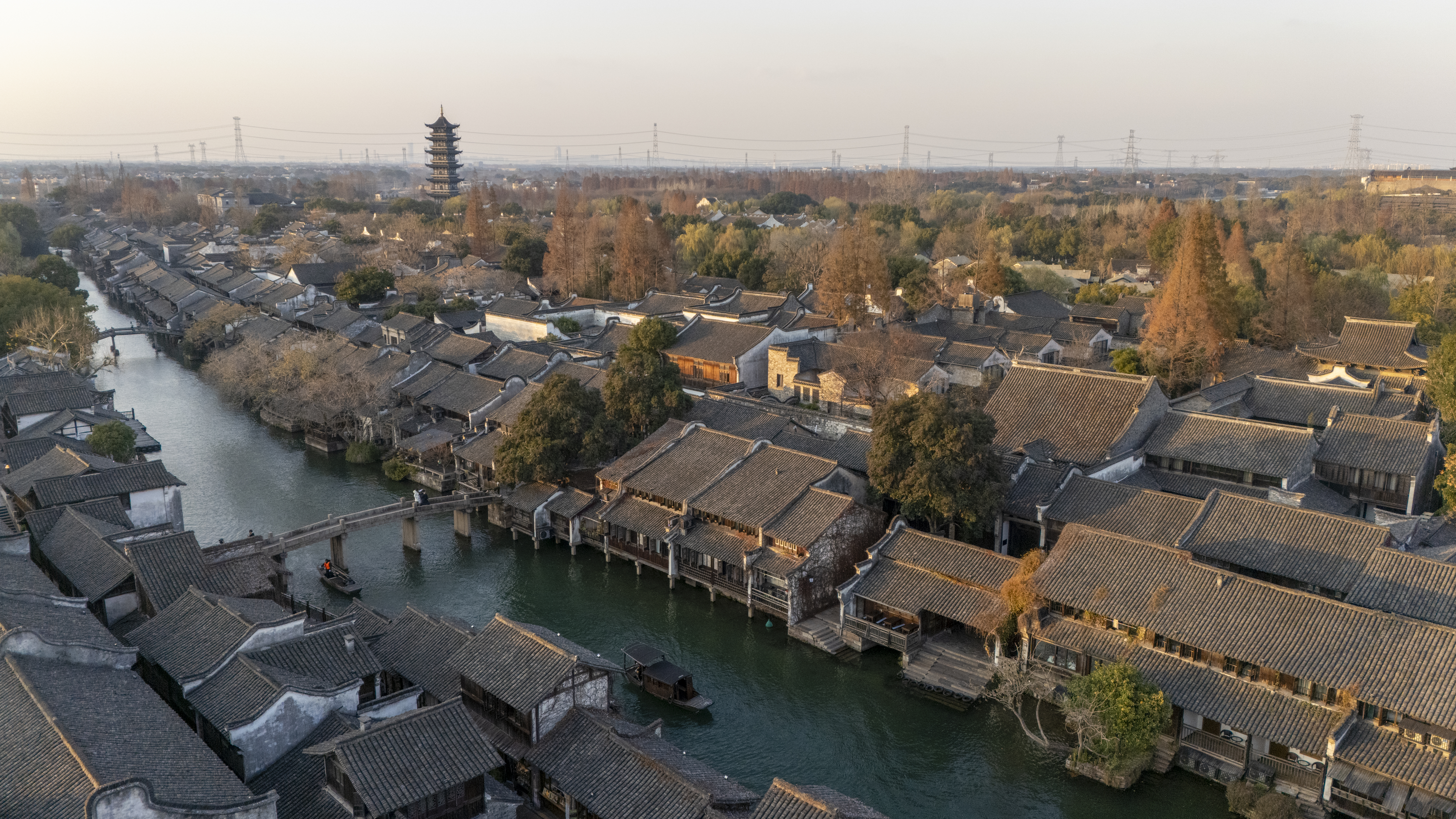
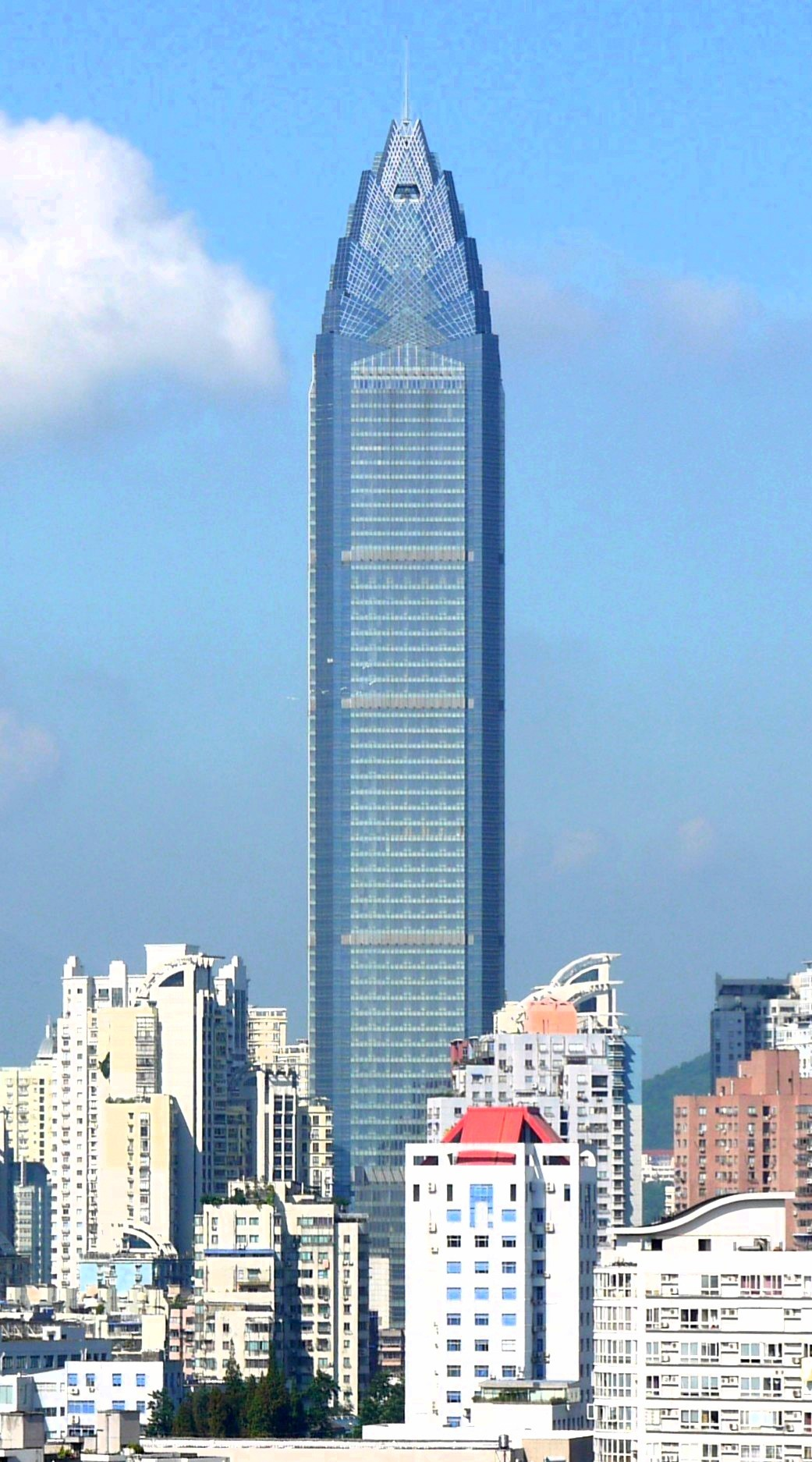
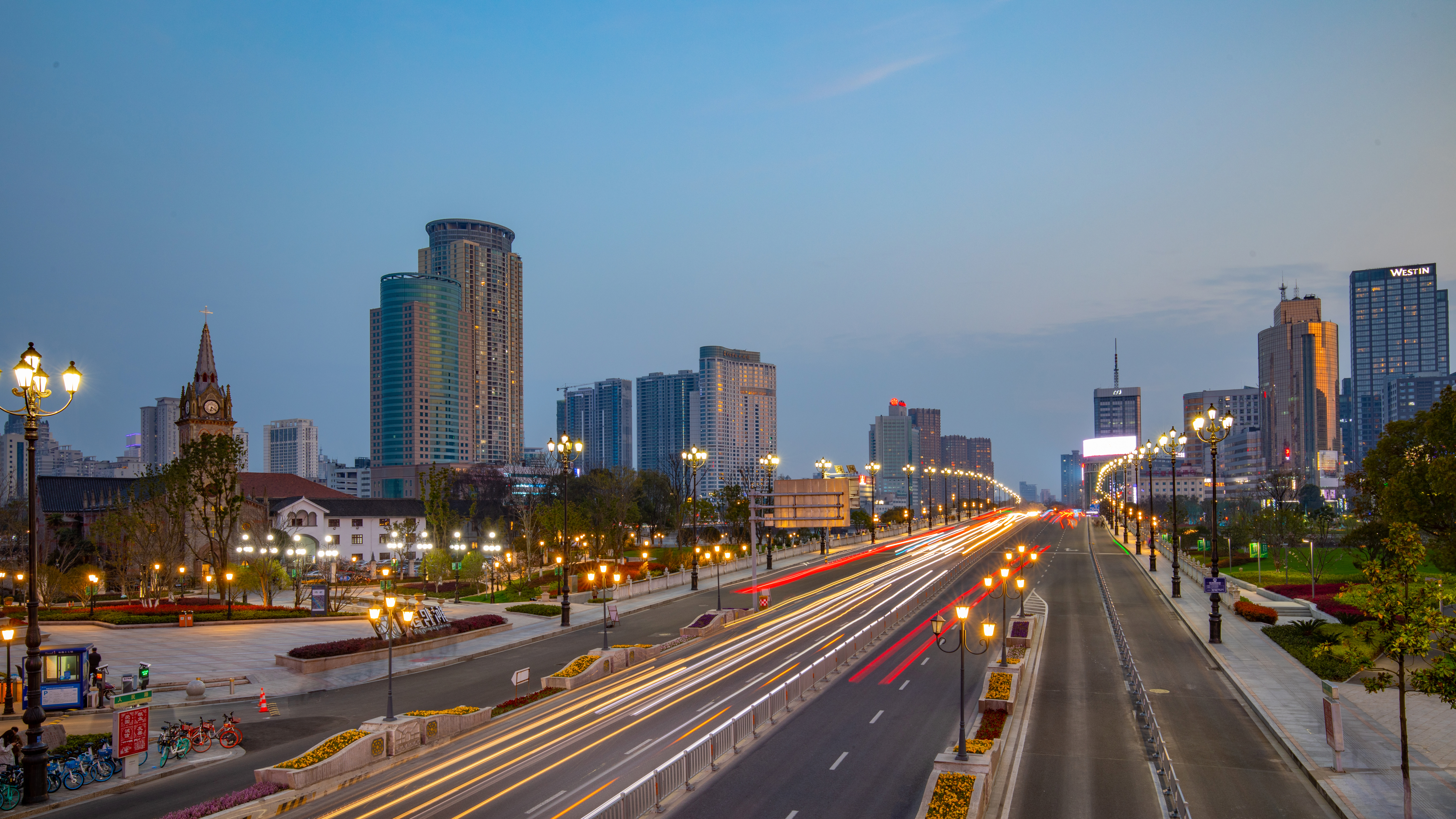
- Hangzhou skyline Leifeng Pagoda and West Lake Wuzhen Wenzhou Ningbo

- Location of Zhejiang in China
- Coordinates: 29°12′N 120°30′E
- Country: China
- Annexation by the Qin dynasty: 222 BC
- Jiangnandong Circuit: 626
- Liangzhe Circuit: 997
- Province established: 1368
- Republican Period: January 1, 1912
- Division of territory: January 7, 1949
- Conquest of Yijiangshan: January 20, 1955
- Named for: Old name of Qiantang River
- Capital and largest city: Hangzhou
- Divisions: Prefecture-level; County-level; Township-; level: 11 prefectures 90 counties 1364 towns and subdistricts

Government
  - Type: Province
  - Body: Zhejiang Provincial People's Congress
  - Party Secretary: Wang Hao
  - Congress Director: Wang Hao
  - Governor: Liu Jie
  - Provincial CPPCC Chairperson: Lian Yimin
  - National People's Congress Representation: 99 deputies

Area
  - Total: 101,800 km^{2} (39,300 sq mi)
  - Rank: 26th
- Highest elevation (Huangmaojian): 1,929 m (6,329 ft)

Population (2020)
  - Total: 64,567,588
  - Rank: 8th
  - Density: 634.3/km^{2} (1,643/sq mi)
  - Rank: 8th

Demographics
  - Ethnic composition: Han: 99.2%; She: 0.4%
  - Languages and dialects: Wu, Huizhou, Jianghuai Mandarin, Southern Min (in Cangnan County and Pingyang County)

GDP (2025)
  - Total: CN¥9.45 trillion (4th; US$1.36 trillion)
  - Per capita: CN¥146,428 (5th; US$21,020)
- ISO 3166 code: CN-ZJ
- HDI (2023): 0.823 (5th) – very high
- Website: www.zj.gov.cn (in Chinese); English version

Zhejiang
- "Zhejiang" in Chinese characters
- Chinese: 浙江
- Wu: Tseh-kaon ['tsəʔ'kɑ̃]
- Postal: Chekiang
- Literal meaning: "Zhe river"
Transcriptions
Standard Mandarin
- Hanyu Pinyin: Zhèjiāng
- Bopomofo: ㄓㄜˋ ㄐㄧㄤ
- Gwoyeu Romatzyh: Jehjiang
- Wade–Giles: Chê^{4}-chiang^{1}
- IPA: [ʈʂɤ̂.tɕjáŋ]
Wu
- Romanization: Tseh-kaon ['tsəʔ'kɑ̃]
Hakka
- Romanization: Tset-kông
Yue: Cantonese
- Yale Romanization: Jit-gōng
- Jyutping: Zit3-gong1
- IPA: [tsit̚˧.kɔŋ˥]
Southern Min
- Hokkien POJ: Chiat-kang
- Tâi-lô: Tsiat-kang
Eastern Min
- Fuzhou BUC: Ciék-gŏng

Zhejiang (Note: UK: /ˌdʒɜːdʒiˈæŋ/ or /dʒɛˈdʒæŋ/, US: /ˌdʒʌdʒiˈɑːŋ/ or /dʒʌˈdʒjɑːŋ/; 浙江, also romanized as Chekiang) is a coastal province in East China. Its capital and largest city is Hangzhou, with other notable cities including Ningbo, Yiwu and Wenzhou. Zhejiang is bordered by Jiangsu and Shanghai to the north, Anhui to the northwest, Jiangxi to the west and Fujian to the south. To the east is the East China Sea, beyond which lies the Ryukyu Islands. The population of Zhejiang stands at 64.6 million, the 8th largest in China. It is a major driving force in the Chinese economy and the birthplace of several notable people, including the Chinese Nationalist leader Chiang Kai-shek and entrepreneur Jack Ma. Zhejiang consists of 90 counties (incl. county-level cities and districts).

The area of Zhejiang was controlled by the Kingdom of Yue during the Spring and Autumn period. The Qin dynasty later annexed it in 222 BC. Under the late Ming dynasty and the Qing dynasty that followed it, Zhejiang's ports became important centers of international trade. It was occupied by the Wang Jingwei regime during World War II. After the establishment of the People's Republic of China, Zhejiang's economy became stagnant under Mao Zedong's policies. After the reform and opening up, Zhejiang grew to be considered one of China's wealthiest provinces, ranking fourth in GDP nationally and fifth by GDP per capita, with a nominal GDP of US$1.27 trillion as of 2024.

Zhejiang consists mostly of hills, which account for about 70% of its total area, with higher altitudes towards the south and the west. Zhejiang also has a longer coastline than any other mainland province of China. The Qiantang River runs through the province, from which it derives its name. Included in the province are three thousand islands, the most in China. The capital Hangzhou marks the end of the Grand Canal and lies on Hangzhou Bay on the north of Zhejiang, which separates Shanghai and Ningbo. The bay contains many small islands collectively called the Zhoushan Islands.

Hangzhou is a historically important city, and is considered a world city with a "Beta+" classification according to GaWC. It includes the notable West Lake. Various varieties of Chinese are spoken in Zhejiang, the most prominent being Wu Chinese. Zhejiang is also one of China's leading provinces in research and education. As of 2025, three major cities in Zhejiang ranked in the world's top 130 cities (Hangzhou 10th, Ningbo 85th and Wenzhou 130th) by scientific research output, as tracked by Nature Index.

== Etymology ==
The province's name originates from the Zhe River (浙江; Zhè Jiāng), the former name of the Qiantang River which flows past Hangzhou and whose mouth forms Hangzhou Bay. It is usually understood as meaning "Crooked" or "Bent River", from the meaning of Chinese 折, but is more likely a phono-semantic compound formed from adding 氵 (the "water" radical used for river names) to phonetic 折 (Pinyin zhé but reconstructed Old Chinese *tet), preserving a proto-Wu name of the local Yue, similar to Yuhang, Kuaiji and Jiang.

== History ==
=== Prehistory ===
Kuahuqiao culture was an early Neolithic settlement in the Hangzhou area extant in 6000–5000 BC.

Zhejiang was the site of the Neolithic cultures of the Hemudu (starting in 5500 BC) and Liangzhu (starting in 3400 BC).

=== Ancient history ===
The area of modern Zhejiang was outside the major sphere of influence of Shang civilization during the second millennium BC. Instead, this area was populated by peoples collectively known as Dongyue.

The kingdom of Yue began to appear in the chronicles and records written during the Spring and Autumn period. According to the chronicles, the kingdom of Yue was in Northern Zhejiang. Shiji claims that its leaders were descended from the Xia founder Yu the Great. The "Song of the Yue Boatman" (Chinese: 越人歌; pinyin: Yuèrén Gē; lit. 'Song of the man of Yue') was transliterated into Chinese and recorded by authors in North China or inland China of Hebei and Henan around 528 BC. The song shows that the Yue people spoke a language that was mutually unintelligible with the dialects spoken in north and inland China. The Sword of Goujian bears bird-worm seal script. Yuenü (Chinese: 越女; pinyin: Yuènǚ; Wade–Giles: Yüeh-nü; lit. 'the Lady of Yue') was a swordswoman from the state of Yue. To check the growth of the kingdom of Wu, Chu pursued a policy of strengthening Yue.

Under King Goujian, Yue recovered from its early reverses and fully annexed the lands of its rival in 473 BC. The Yue kings then moved their capital center from their original home around Mount Kuaiji in present-day Shaoxing to the former Wu capital at present-day Suzhou. With no southern power to turn against Yue, Chu opposed it directly and, in 333 BC, succeeded in destroying it. Yue's former lands were annexed by the Qin Empire in 222 BC and organized into a commandery named for Kuaiji in Zhejiang but initially headquartered in Wu in Jiangsu.

=== Han empire and the Three Kingdoms ===
Kuaiji Commandery was the initial power base for Xiang Liang and Xiang Yu's rebellion against the Qin Empire which initially succeeded in restoring the kingdom of Chu but eventually fell to the Han. Under the Later Han, control of the area returned to the settlement below Mount Kuaiji but authority over the Minyue hinterland was nominal at best and its Yue inhabitants largely retained their own political and social structures.

After the Han empire ended, Zhejiang was home to the warlords Yan Baihu and Wang Lang prior to their defeat by Sun Ce and Sun Quan, who eventually established the Kingdom of Wu. Despite the removal of their court from Kuaiji to Jianye (present-day Nanjing) and they continued development of the region and benefitted from influxes of refugees fleeing the turmoil in northern China. Industrial kilns were established and trade reached as far as Manchuria and Funan (southern Mainland Southeast Asia).

Zhejiang was part of the Wu during the Three Kingdoms. Wu (229–280), commonly known as Eastern Wu or Sun Wu, had been the economically most developed state among the Three Kingdoms (220–280). The historical novel Romance of the Three Kingdoms records that Zhejiang had the best-equipped naval force. The story depicts how the states of Wei (魏) and Shu (蜀), lack of material resources, avoided direct confrontation with the Wu. In armed military conflicts with Wu, the two states relied intensively on tactics of camouflage and deception to steal Wu's military resources including arrows and bows.

=== Six Dynasties ===
Despite the continuing prominence of Nanjing (then known as Jiankang), the settlement of Qiantang, the former name of Hangzhou, remained one of the three major metropolitan centers in the south to provide major tax revenue to the imperial centers in the north China. The other two centers in the south were Jiankang and Chengdu. In 589, Qiantang was raised in status and renamed Hangzhou.

Following the fall of Wu and the turmoil of the Wu Hu uprising against the Jin dynasty (266–420), most of elite Chinese families had collaborated with the non-Chinese rulers and military conquerors in the north. Some may have lost social privilege and took refuge in areas south of the Yangtze River. Some of the Chinese refugees from North China might have resided in areas near Hangzhou. For example, the clan of Zhuge Liang (181–234), a chancellor of the kingdom of Shu Han from Central Plain in north China, gathered together at the suburb of Hangzhou prefecture, forming an exclusive, closed village Zhuge Village (Zhege Cun), consisting of villagers all with family name "Zhuge." The village has intentionally isolated itself from the surrounding communities for centuries to this day and only recently came to be known in public. It suggests that a small number of powerful, elite Chinese refugees from the Central Plain might have taken refuge south of the Yangtze River. However, considering the mountainous geography and relative lack of agrarian lands in Zhejiang, most of these refugees might have resided in some areas in South China beyond Zhejiang, where fertile agrarian lands and metropolitan resources were available, mainly Southern Jiangsu, Eastern Fujian, Jiangxi, Hunan, Anhui and provinces where less cohesive, organized regional governments had been in place. Some refugees from North China might have found residence in South China depending on their social status and military power in the north. The rump Jin kingdom or the Southern dynasties vied against some Han elites from the Central Plain and south of the Yangtze River.

=== Sui and Tang empires ===
Zhejiang, as the heartland of the Jiangnan (Yangtze River Delta), remained the wealthiest area during the Six Dynasties (220 or 222–589), Sui and Tang. After being incorporated into the Sui dynasty, its economic richness was used for the Sui dynasty's ambitions to expand north and south, particularly into Korea and Vietnam. The plan led the Sui dynasty to restore and expand the network which became the Grand Canal of China. The Canal regularly transported grains and resources from Zhejiang, through its metropolitan center Hangzhou (and its hinterland along both the Zhe River and the shores of Hangzhou Bay) and from Suzhou and thence to the North China Plain. The débâcle of the Korean war led to Sui's overthrow by the Tang, who then presided over a centuries-long golden age for the country. Zhejiang was an important economic center of the empire's Jiangnan East Circuit and was considered particularly prosperous. Throughout the Tang dynasty, The Grand Canal had remained effective, transporting grains and material resources to North China Plain and metropolitan centers of the empire. As the Tang dynasty disintegrated, Zhejiang constituted most of the territory of the regional kingdom of Wuyue.

=== Wuyue kingdom ===
After the collapse of the Tang dynasty in 907, the entire area of what is now Zhejiang fell under the control of the kingdom Wuyue established by King Qian Liu, who selected Hangzhou (a city in the modern day area of Zhejiang) as his kingdom's capital. Despite being under Wuyue rule for a relatively short period of time, Zhejiang underwent a long period of financial and cultural prosperity which continued even after the kingdom fell.

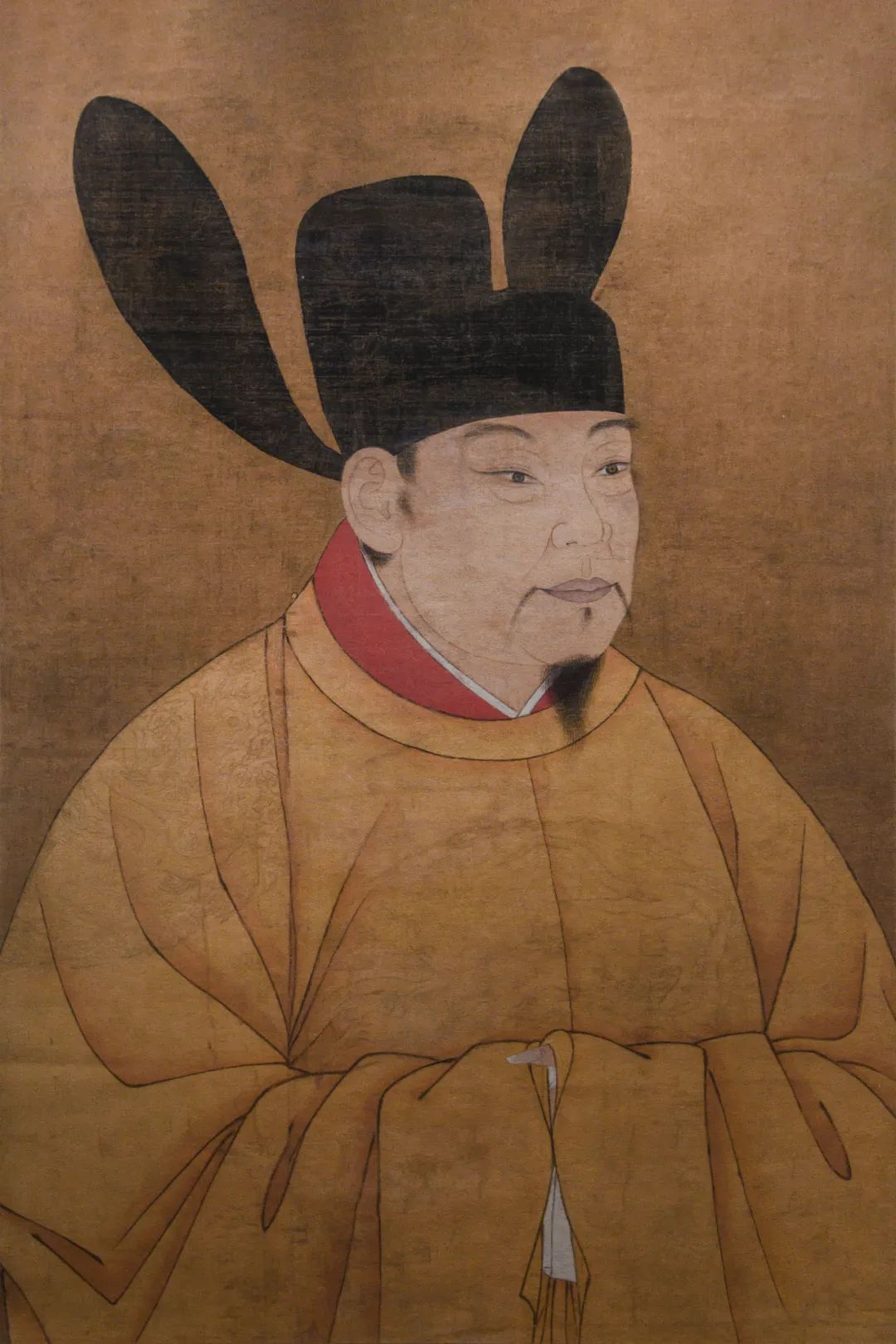
Portrait of Qian Liu, the King of Wuyue, by Ming dynasty painter.

After Wuyue was conquered during the reunification of China, many shrines were erected across the former territories of Wuyue, mainly in Zhejiang, where the kings of Wuyue were memorialized, and sometimes, worshipped as being able to dictate weather and agriculture. Many of these shrines, known as "Shrine of the Qian King" or "Temple to the Qian King", still remain today, with the most popularly visited example being that near West Lake in Hangzhou.

China's province of Zhejiang during the 940s was also the place of origin of the Hú family (Hồ in Vietnamese) from which the founder of the Hồ dynasty who ruled Vietnam, Emperor Hồ Quý Ly, came from.

=== Song empire ===
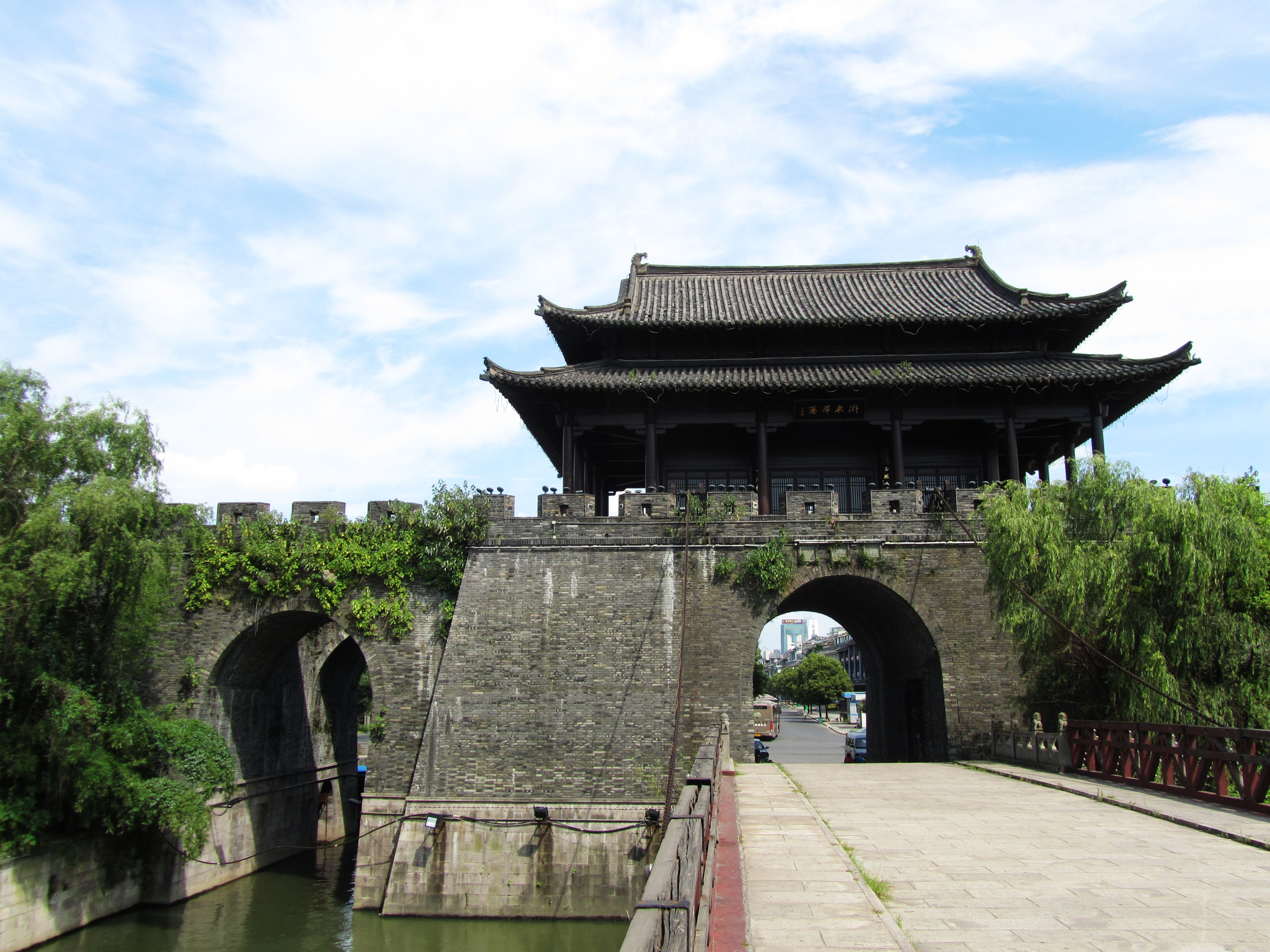
Song dynasty era (1223) city gate in Shaoxing

The Uyue kingdom was annexed by Song dynasty thus it re-established unity around 960. Under the Song empire, the prosperity of South China began to overtake that of North China. In 1127, Hangzhou became the capital of the Song dynasty under the name Lin'an, which was renowned for its prosperity and beauty, it was suspected to have been the largest city in the world at the time.

From then on, northern Zhejiang and neighboring southern Jiangsu have been synonymous with luxury and opulence in Chinese culture. The Mongol conquest and the establishment of the Yuan state in 1279 ended Hangzhou's political clout, but its economy continued to prosper. The famous Venetian traveler Marco Polo visited the city, which he called "Kinsay" (after the Chinese Jingshi, meaning "Capital City") claiming it was "the finest and noblest city in the world."

Greenware ceramics made from celadon had been made in the area since the 3rd-century Jin dynasty, but it returned to prominence—particularly in Longquan—during the Southern Song and Yuan. Longquan greenware is characterized by a thick unctuous glaze of a particular bluish-green tint over an otherwise undecorated light-gray porcellaneous body that is delicately potted. Yuan Longquan celadons feature a thinner, greener glaze on larger vessels with decoration and shapes derived from Middle Eastern ceramic and metalwares. These were produced in large quantities for the Chinese export trade to Southeast Asia, the Middle East and (during the Ming dynasty) Europe. By the Ming, however, production was notably deficient in quality. It is in this period that the Longquan kilns declined, to be eventually replaced in popularity and ceramic production by the kilns of Jingdezhen in Jiangxi.

=== Early modern era ===
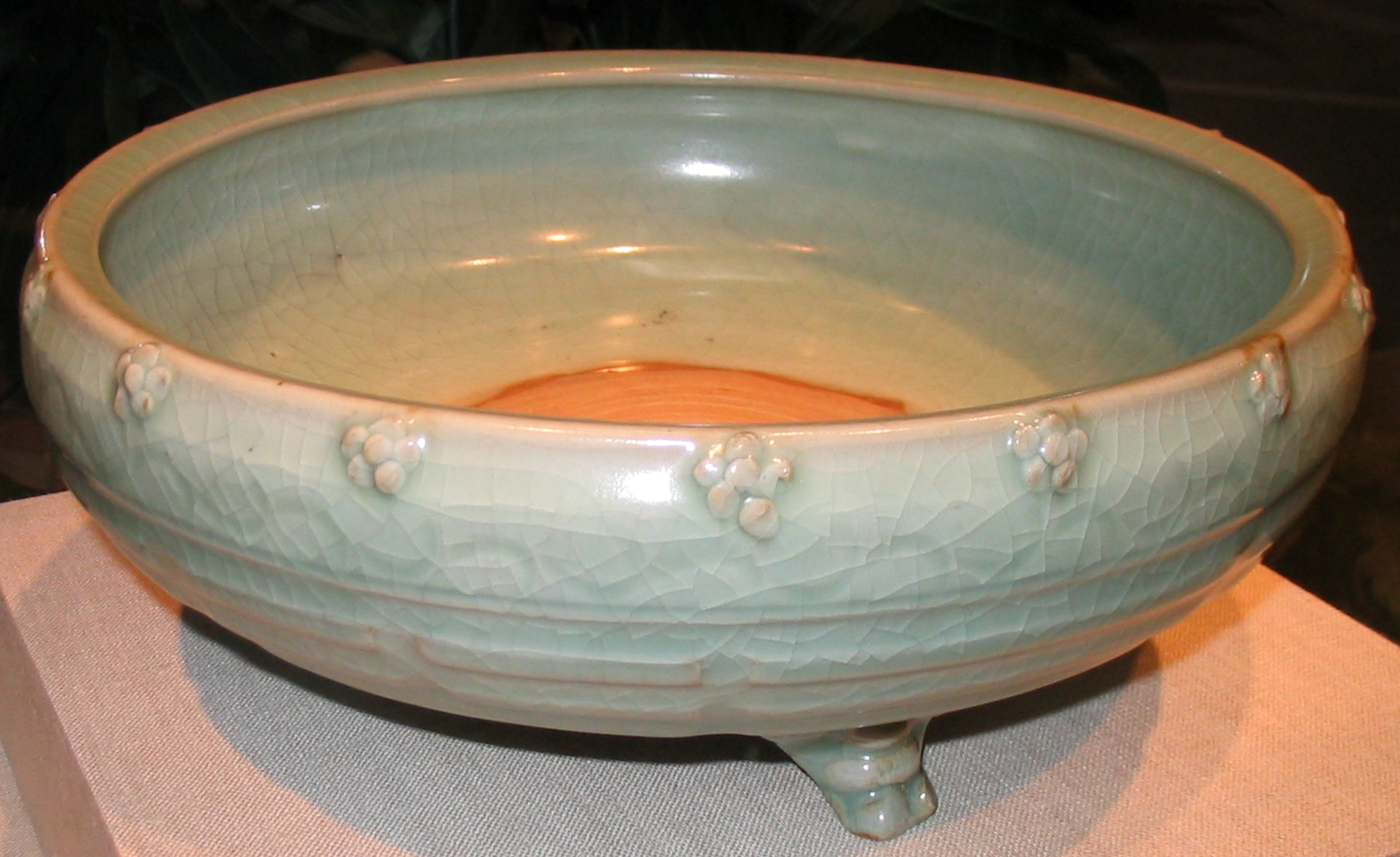
This tripod planter from the Ming dynasty was found in Zhejiang. It is housed in the Smithsonian in Washington, D.C.

In the late 13th century, Zhejiang was finally occupied by the Mongols, who merged it with neighboring provinces.

In 1368, the present day province was established. As in other coastal provinces, number of fortresses were constructed along the Zhejiang coast during the early Ming empire to defend the land against pirate incursions. Some of them have been preserved or restored, such as Pucheng in the south of the province (Cangnan County).

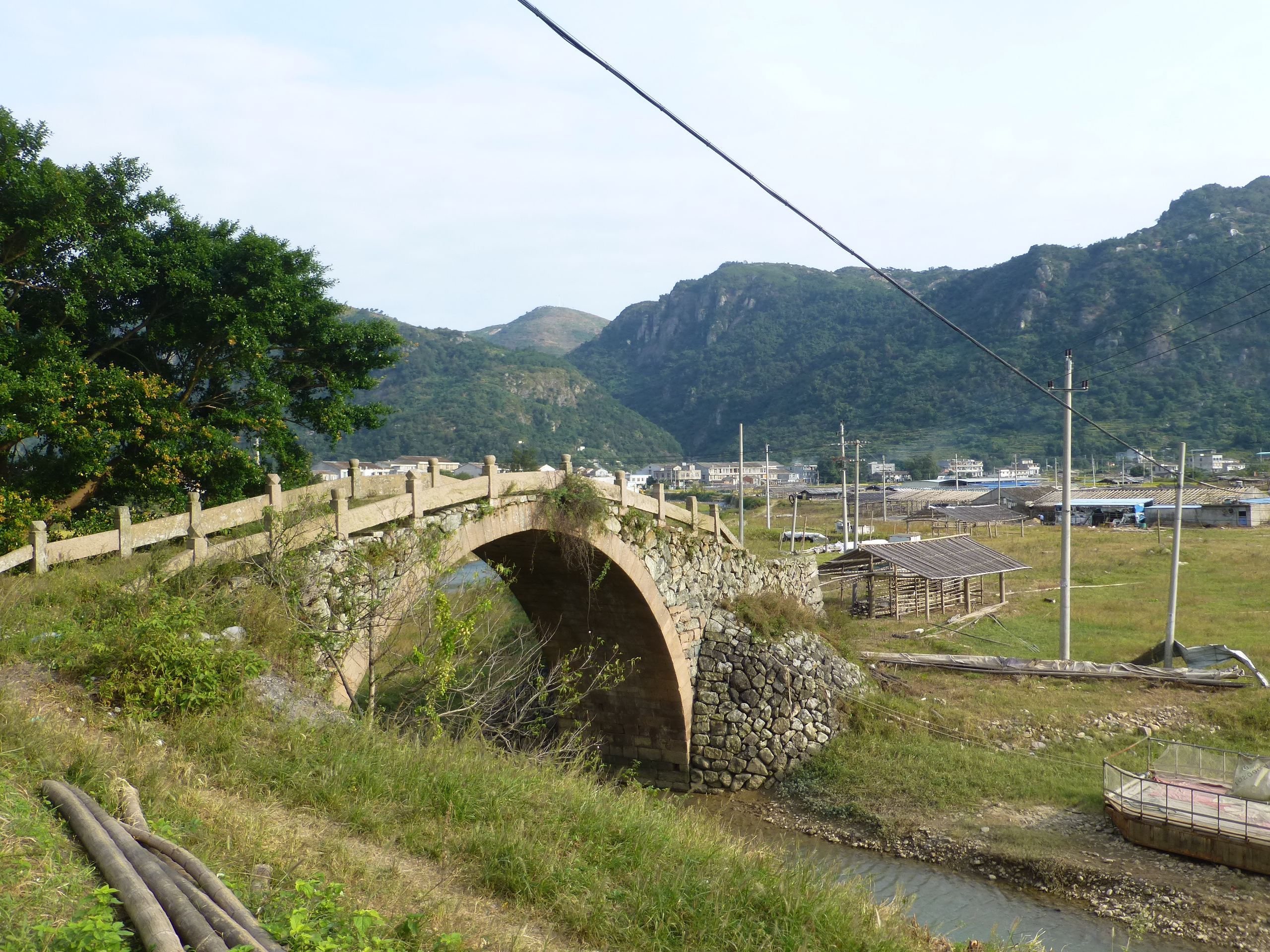
A restored Qing era (1891) bridge on a coastal road

Under the late Ming dynasty and the Qing regime that followed it, Zhejiang's ports were important centers of international trade.

"In 1727 the to-min or "idle people" of Cheh Kiang province (a Ningpo name still existing), the yoh-hu or "music people" of Shanxi province, the si-min or 'small people' of Kiang Su (Jiangsu) province and the Tanka people or "egg-people" of Canton (to this day the boat population there), were all freed from their social disabilities and allowed to count as free men." "Cheh Kiang" is another romanization for Zhejiang. The Duomin (Chinese: 惰民; pinyin: duò mín; Wade–Giles: to-min) are a caste of outcasts used to make up most of the populace of Zhejiang.

During the First Opium War, the British navy defeated the Qing state at Ningbo and Dinghai. Under the terms of the Treaty of Nanking, signed in 1843, Ningbo became one of the five Chinese treaty ports opened to virtually unrestricted foreign trade. Much of western Zhejiang came under the control of the Taiping Heavenly Kingdom, and during that period the result was a considerable immigration and loss of life as rebels killed all foreigners, sparing the rest of Zhejiang. In 1876, Wenzhou became Zhejiang's second treaty port.

=== Republican era ===
In 1912, the Qing dynasty was overthrown, and the Republic of China (ROC) assumed control of the province.

During World War II, much of Zhejiang was occupied by the Reorganized National Government of China. Following the Doolittle Raid, most of the B-25 American crews that came down in China eventually made it to safety with the help of anti-Japanese locals. The Imperial Japanese Army began the Zhejiang-Jiangxi Campaign to intimidate the Chinese out of helping downed American airmen. At least 10,000 civilians died in Jiangxi while searching for Doolittle's men.

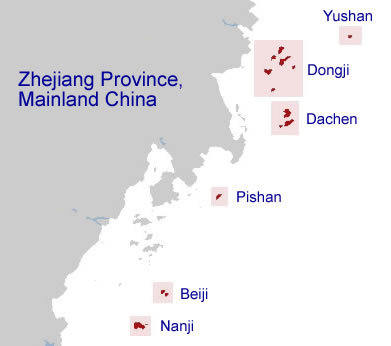
Zheijiang partially under ROC control, between 1949 and 1955.

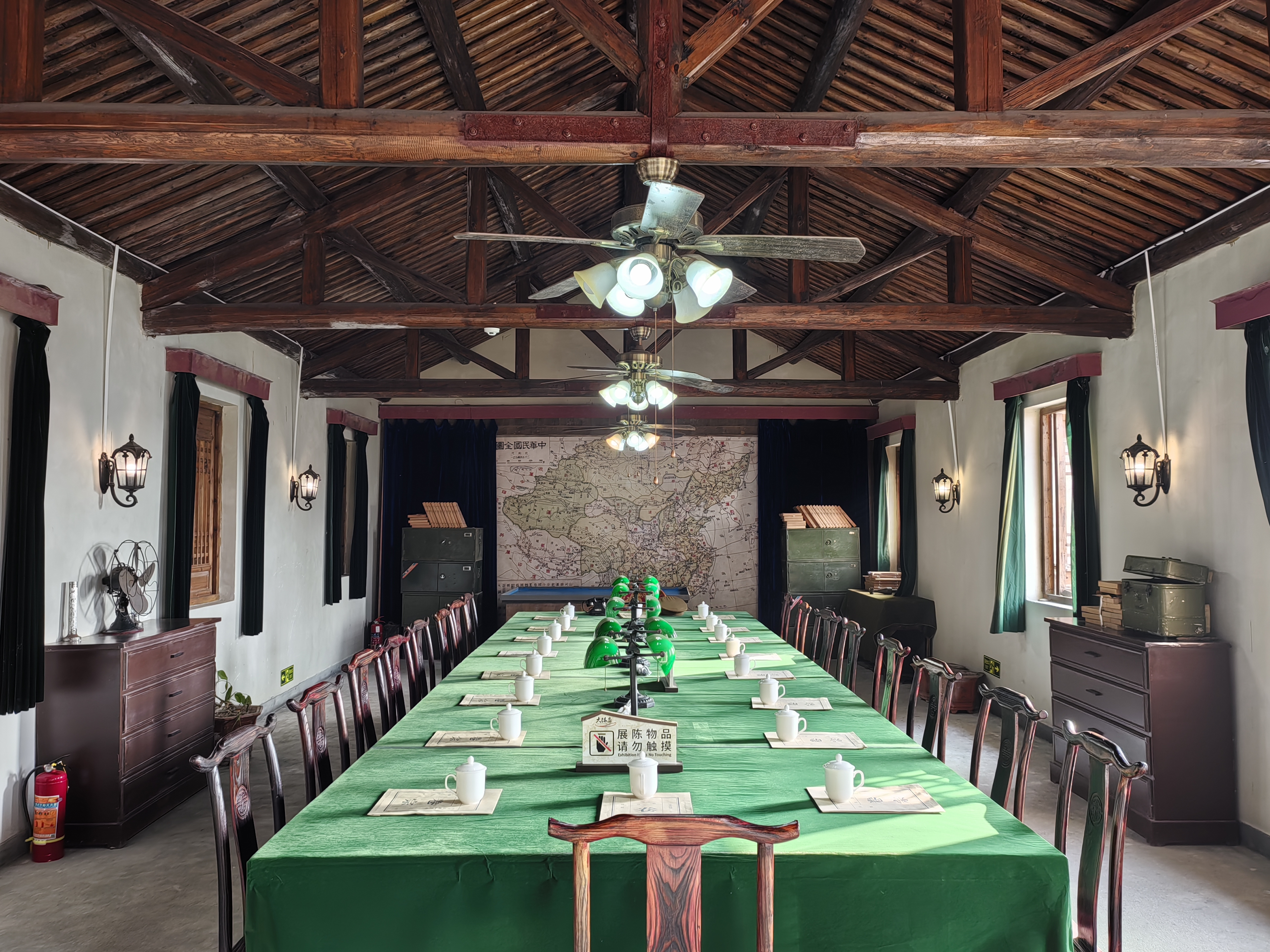
General Headquarters of the Jiangsu–Zhejiang Anti-Communist National Salvation Army in Dachen

After the ROC retreated to Taiwan near the end of the Chinese Civil War, the PRC captured the majority of the province. However, the ROC continued to control some coastal islands, including Yushan, Toumenshan, Yijiangshan, Dachen, Pishan and Nanji. The ROC carried out raids on PRC-controlled Zhejiang and occasionally areas near Shanghai.

The province was organized into seven counties: Wenling, Linhai, Huangyan, Pinyang, Sanmen, Yueqing and Yuhuan. ROC President Chiang Kai-shek appointed General Hu Zongnan to establish a provincial government on the Dachen Islands in September 1951 to fight the PRC. In 1952, Zhejiang was reorganized into four counties: Wenling, Linhai, Pinyang and Yuhuan. Sanmen became the Yushan Administrative Bureau. The Zhuyu Administrative Bureau was also established. The administrative bureaus were intended to manage trade with Mainland China. In 1953, the administrative bureaus were abolished and the provincial government relocated to Taiwan in 1953.

In 1955, the PRC captured the remainder of Zheijiang during the First Taiwan Strait Crisis. The PRC captured Yijiangshan in January. The ROC evacuated the Dachens in February, with the PRC occupying the Dachens by the end of the month, finally bring the entire province under its control.

=== People's Republic era ===
During the Cultural Revolution (1966–76), Zhejiang was in chaos and disunity and its economy was stagnant, especially during the high tide (1966–69) of the revolution. The agricultural policy favoring grain production at the expense of industrial and cash crops intensified economic hardships in the province. Mao's self-reliance policy and the reduction in maritime trade cut off the lifelines of the port cities of Ningbo and Wenzhou. While Mao invested heavily in railroads in interior China, no major railroads were built in South Zhejiang, where transportation remained poor.

Zhejiang benefited less from central government investment than some other provinces due to its lack of natural resources, a location vulnerable to potential flooding from the sea and an economic base at the national average. Zhejiang, however, has been an epicenter of capitalist development in China and has led the nation in the development of a market economy and private enterprises. Northeast Zhejiang, as part of the Yangtze Delta, is flat, more developed and industrial.

== Geography ==
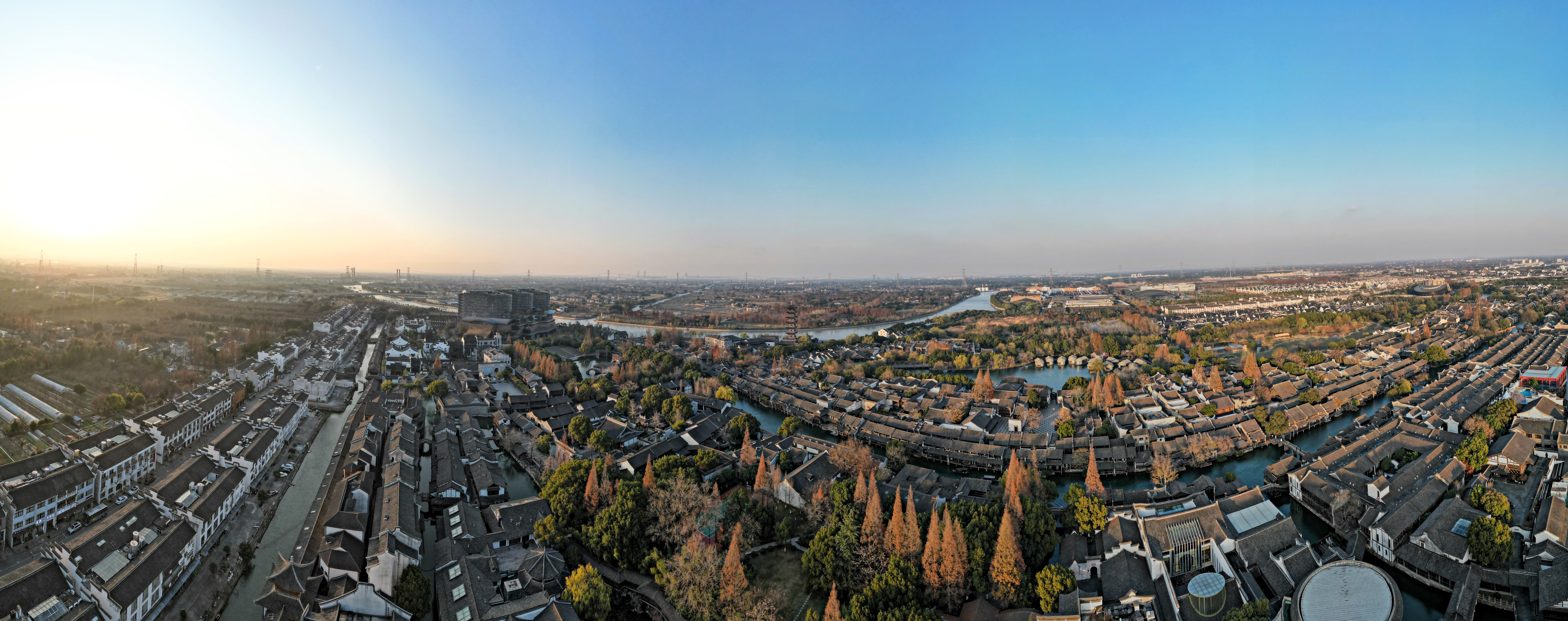
Aerial panorama of Wuzhen 乌镇 Water Town, December 2023

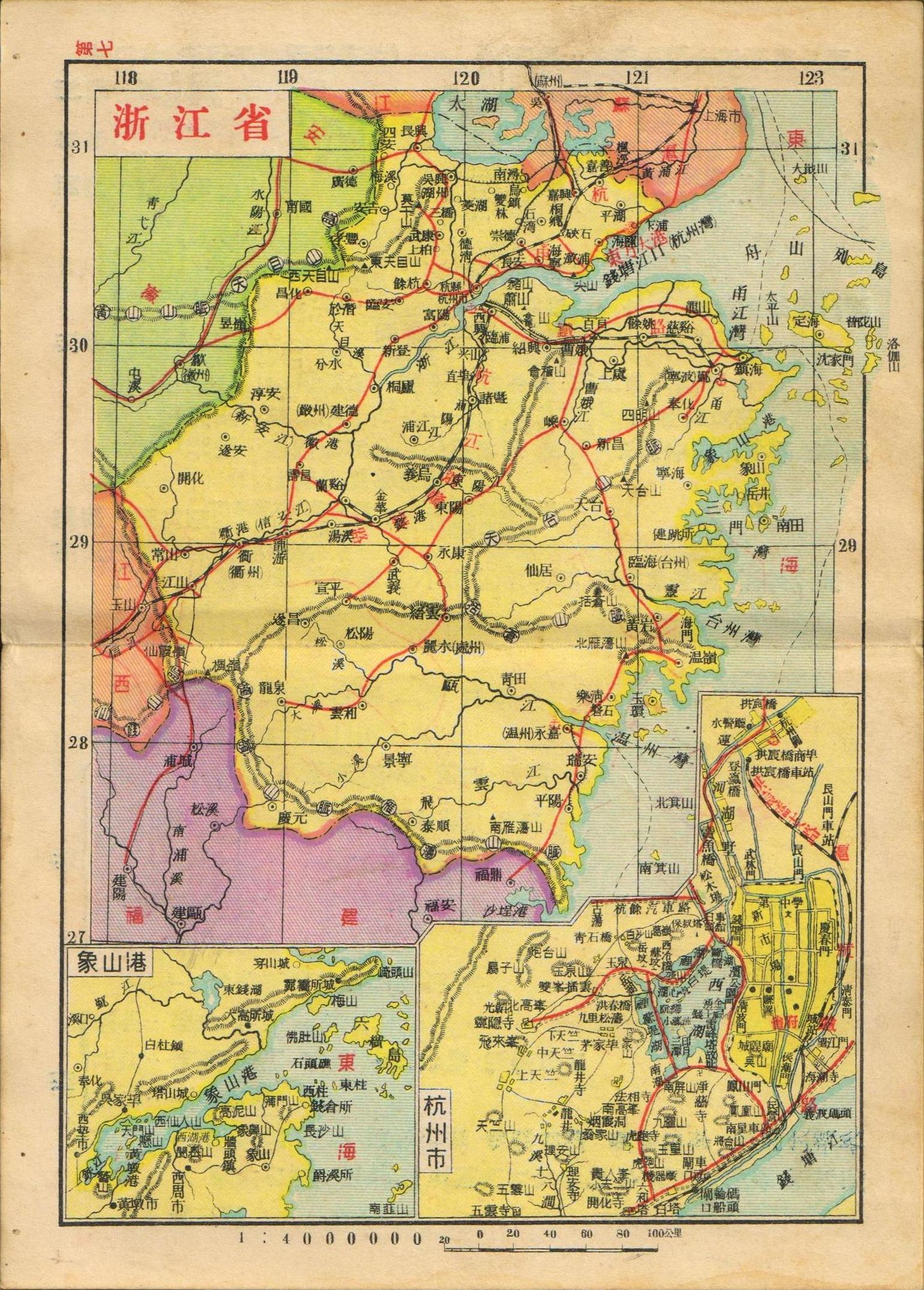
Zhejiang in 1936

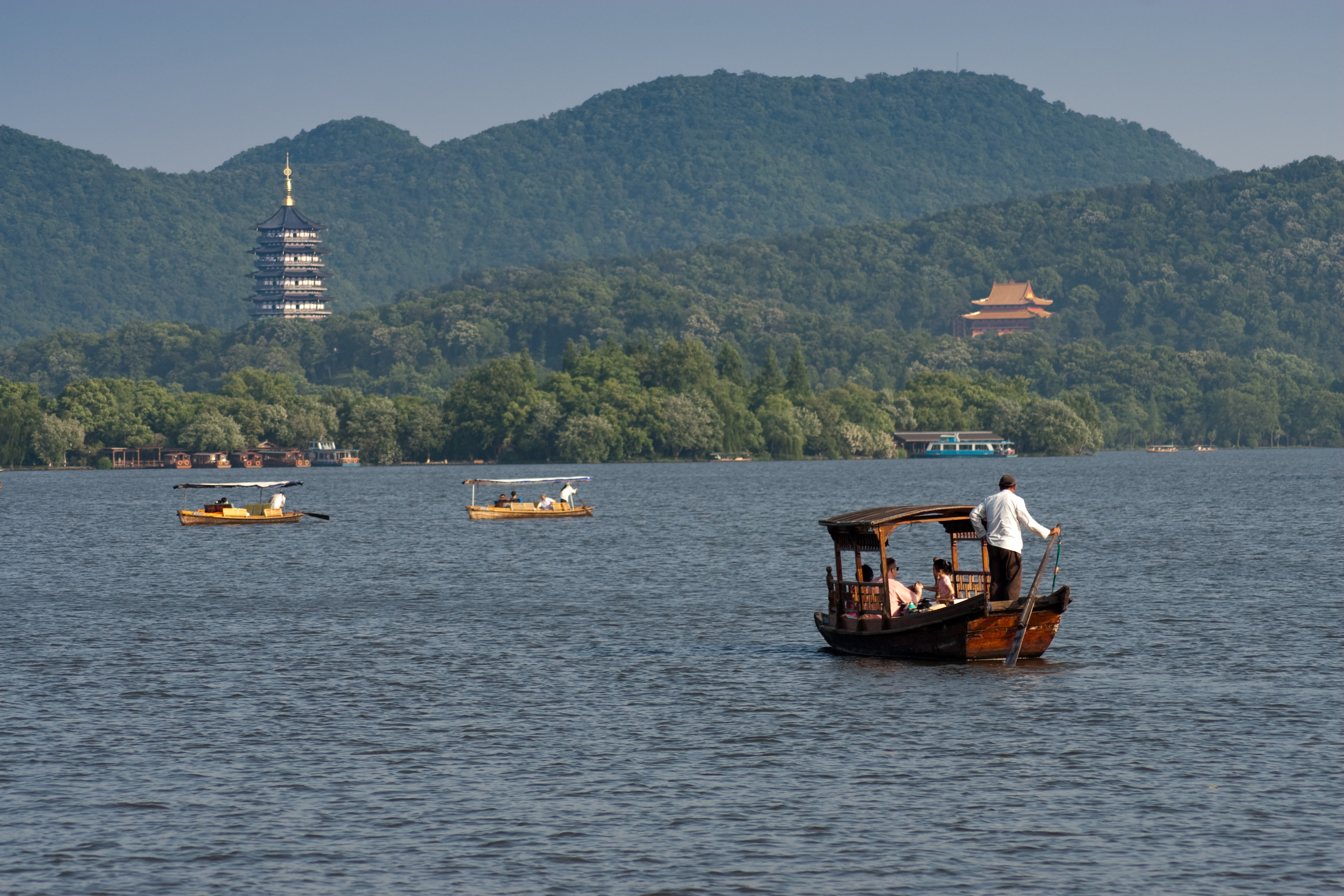
View of the West Lake in Hangzhou

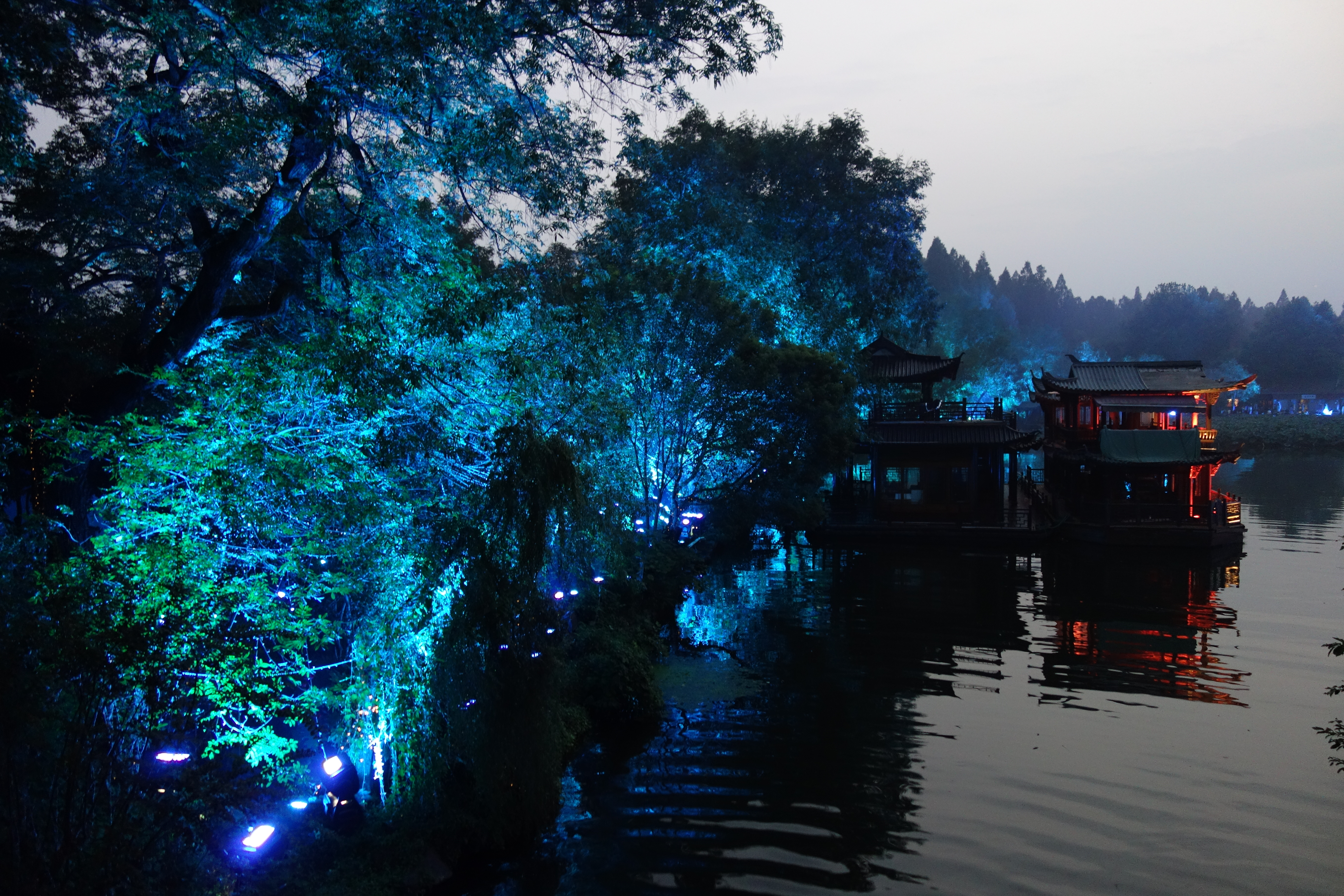
West Lake at night

Zhejiang consists mostly of hills, which account for about 70% of its total area. Altitudes tend to be the highest to the south and west and the highest peak of the province, Huangmaojian Peak (1,929 meters or 6,329 feet), is located there. Other prominent mountains include Mounts Yandang, Tianmu, Tiantai and Mogan, which reach altitudes of 700 to 1,500 meters (2,300 to 4,900 ft).

Valleys and plains are found along the coastline and rivers. The north of the province lies just south of the Yangtze Delta and consists of plains around the cities of Hangzhou, Jiaxing and Huzhou, where the Grand Canal of China enters from the northern border to end at Hangzhou. Another relatively flat area is found along the Qu River around the cities of Quzhou and Jinhua. Major rivers include the Qiangtang and Ou Rivers. Most rivers carve out valleys in the highlands, with plenty of rapids and other features associated with such topography. Well-known lakes include the West Lake of Hangzhou and the South Lake of Jiaxing.

There are over three thousand islands along the rugged coastline of Zhejiang. The largest, Zhoushan Island, is mainland China's third largest island, after Hainan and Chongming. There are also many bays, of which Hangzhou Bay is the largest. Zhejiang has a humid subtropical climate with four distinct seasons. Spring starts in March and is rainy with changeable weather. Summer, from June to September is long, hot, rainy and humid. Fall is generally dry, warm and sunny. Winters are short but cold except in the far south. Average annual temperature is around 15 to 19 °C (59 to 66 °F), average January temperature is around 2 to 8 °C (36 to 46 °F) and average July temperature is around 27 to 30 °C (81 to 86 °F). Annual precipitation is about 1,000 to 1,900 mm (39 to 75 in). There is plenty of rainfall in early summer and by late summer Zhejiang is directly threatened by typhoons forming in the Pacific.

== Administrative divisions ==
Zhejiang is divided into eleven prefecture-level divisions: all prefecture-level cities (including two sub-provincial cities):

Administrative divisions of Zhejiang
| Division code | Division | Area in km^{2} | Population 2020 | Seat | Divisions | | | |
| Division code | Division | Area in km^{2} | Population 2020 | Seat | Districts | Counties | Aut. counties | CL cities |
|---|---|---|---|---|---|---|---|---|
| 330000 | Zhejiang Province | 101,800.00 | 64,567,588 | Hangzhou city | 37 | 32 | 1 | 20 |
| 330100 | Hangzhou city | 16,840.75 | 11,936,010 | Shangcheng District | 10 | 2 | | 1 |
| 330200 | Ningbo city | 9,816.23 | 9,404,283 | Yinzhou District | 6 | 2 | | 2 |
| 330300 | Wenzhou city | 12,255.77 | 9,572,903 | Lucheng District | 4 | 5 | | 3 |
| 330400 | Jiaxing city | 4,008.75 | 5,400,868 | Nanhu District | 2 | 2 | | 3 |
| 330500 | Huzhou city | 5,818.44 | 3,367,579 | Wuxing District | 2 | 3 | | |
| 330600 | Shaoxing city | 8,279.08 | 5,270,977 | Yuecheng District | 3 | 1 | | 2 |
| 330700 | Jinhua city | 10,926.16 | 7,050,683 | Wucheng District | 2 | 3 | | 4 |
| 330800 | Quzhou city | 8,841.12 | 2,276,184 | Kecheng District | 2 | 3 | | 1 |
| 330900 | Zhoushan city | 1,378.00 | 1,157,817 | Dinghai District | 2 | 2 | | |
| 331000 | Taizhou city | 10,083.39 | 6,622,888 | Jiaojiang District | 3 | 3 | | 3 |
| 331100 | Lishui city | 17,298.00 | 2,507,396 | Liandu District | 1 | 6 | 1 | 1 |
Sub-provincial cities

Administrative divisions in Chinese and varieties of romanizations
| English | Chinese | Pinyin | Wu Romanization |
|---|---|---|---|
| Zhejiang Province | 浙江省 | Zhèjiāng Shěng | tseh koan san |
| Hangzhou city | 杭州市 | Hángzhōu Shì | ghaon tseu zy |
| Ningbo city | 宁波市 | Níngbō Shì | nyin bo zy |
| Wenzhou city | 温州市 | Wēnzhōu Shì | uen tseu zy |
| Jiaxing city | 嘉兴市 | Jiāxīng Shì | ka shin zy |
| Huzhou city | 湖州市 | Húzhōu Shì | ghou tseu zy |
| Shaoxing city | 绍兴市 | Shàoxīng Shì | zau shin zy |
| Jinhua city | 金华市 | Jīnhuá Shì | cin gho zy |
| Quzhou city | 衢州市 | Qúzhōu Shì | jiu tseu zy |
| Zhoushan city | 舟山市 | Zhōushān Shì | tseu se zy |
| Taizhou city | 台州市 | Tāizhōu Shì | de tseu zy |
| Lishui city | 丽水市 | Líshuǐ Shì | li syu zy |

The eleven prefecture-level divisions of Zhejiang are subdivided into 90 county-level divisions (37 districts, 20 county-level cities, 32 counties, and one autonomous county). Those are in turn divided into 1,364 township-level divisions (618 towns, 488 townships, and 258 subdistricts). Hengdian belongs to Jinhua, which is the largest base of shooting films and TV dramas in China. Hengdian World Studios is called "China's Hollywood." At the year end of 2021, the total population was 65.40 million.

Population by urban areas of prefecture & county cities
| # | Cities | 2020 Urban area | 2010 Urban area | 2020 City proper |
|---|---|---|---|---|
| 1 | Hangzhou | 9,236,032 | 5,162,093 (Note: New districts established after 2010 census: Fuyang (Fuyang CLC), Lin'an (Lin'an CLC). These new districts not included in the urban area count of the pre-expanded city.) | 11,936,010 |
| 2 | Ningbo | 4,077,815 | 2,583,073 (Note: New district established after 2010 census: Fenghua (Fenghua CLC). The new district not included in the urban area count of the pre-expanded city.) | 9,404,283 |
| 3 | Wenzhou | 2,412,402 | 2,686,825 (Note: New district established after 2010 census: Dongtou (Dongtou County). The new district not included in the urban area count of the pre-expanded city.) | 9,572,903 |
| 4 | Shaoxing | 2,333,080 | 643,199 (Note: New districts established after 2010 census: Keqiao (Shaoxing County), Shangyu (Shangyu CLC). These new districts not included in the urban area count of the pre-expanded city.) | 5270977 |
| 5 | Taizhou | 1,485,502 | 1,189,276 | 6,622,888 |
| 6 | Yiwu | 1,481,384 | 878,903 | see Jinhua |
| 7 | Cixi | 1,457,510 | 1,059,942 | see Ningbo |
| 8 | Jiaxing | 1,188,321 | 762,643 | 5,400,868 |
| 9 | Huzhou | 1,083,953 | 748,471 | 3,367,579 |
| 10 | Jinhua | 1,040,948 | 710,597 | 7,050,683 |
| 11 | Yuyao | 1,013,866 | 672,909 | see Ningbo |
| 12 | Rui'an | 1,012,731 | 927,383 | see Wenzhou |
| 13 | Yueqing | 949,585 | 725,972 | see Wenzhou |
| 14 | Wenling | 920,913 | 749,013 | see Taizhou |
| 15 | Zhuji | 762,917 | 606,683 | see Shaoxing |
| 16 | Haining | 752,775 | 397,690 | see Jiaxing |
| 17 | Dongyang | 738,721 | 455,912 | see Jinhua |
| 18 | Tongxiang | 690,641 | 400,417 | see Jiaxing |
| 19 | Zhoushan | 645,653 | 542,190 | 1,157,817 |
| 20 | Yongkang | 638,563 | 376,246 | see Jinhua |
| 21 | Quzhou | 576,688 | 422,688 | 2,276,184 |
| 22 | Linhai | 551,458 | 503,377 | see Taizhou |
| 23 | Yuhuan | 468,554 | (Note: Yuhuan County is currently known as Yuhuan CLC after 2010 census.) | see Taizhou |
| 24 | Longgang | 450,286 | (Note: Longgang Town was under Cangnan County jurisdiction. Longgang CLC was established after 2010 census.) | see Wenzhou |
| 25 | Pinghu | 449,636 | 346,892 | see Jiaxing |
| 26 | Lishui | 429,633 | 293,968 | 2,507,396 |
| 27 | Shengzhou | 386,087 | 345,674 | see Shaoxing |
| 28 | Lanxi | 318,165 | 208,272 | see Jinhua |
| 29 | Jiangshan | 289,269 | 200,341 | see Quzhou |
| 30 | Jiande | 233,658 | 183,518 | see Hangzhou |
| 31 | Longquan | 165,567 | 117,239 | see Lishui |
| — | Fuyang | see Hangzhou | 416,195 | see Hangzhou |
| — | Shangyu | see Shaoxing | 391,558 | see Shaoxing |
| — | Lin'an | see Hangzhou | 271,249 | see Hangzhou |
| — | Fenghua | see Ningbo | 239,992 | see Ningbo |

Most populous cities in Zhejiang Source: China Urban Construction Statistical Yearbook 2018 Urban Population and Urban Temporary Population
| Rank | | Pop. | Rank | | Pop. |
|---|---|---|---|---|---|
| 1 | Hangzhou | 6,504,900 | 11 | Yueqing | 534,700 |
| 2 | Ningbo | 3,685,100 | 12 | Cixi | 530,300 |
| 3 | Wenzhou | 2,216,500 | 13 | Yuyao | 458,500 |
| 4 | Shaoxing | 1,512,600 | 14 | Zhuji | 438,200 |
| 5 | Taizhou | 1,050,600 | 15 | Dongyang | 421,700 |
| 6 | Huzhou | 951,000 | 16 | Lishui | 372,000 |
| 7 | Yiwu | 934,300 | 17 | Tongxiang | 363,400 |
| 8 | Jinhua | 817,300 | 18 | Quzhou | 356,700 |
| 9 | Jiaxing | 797,000 | 19 | Pinghu | 349,500 |
| 10 | Zhoushan | 612,400 | 20 | Linhai | 317,900 |

== Politics ==
The politics of Zhejiang is structured in a dual party-government system like all other governing institutions in mainland China. The Governor of Zhejiang is the highest-ranking official in the People's Government of Zhejiang. However, in the province's dual party-government governing system, the Governor is subordinate to the secretary of the Zhejiang Provincial Committee of the Chinese Communist Party.

Several political figures who served as Zhejiang's top political office of Party Secretary have played key roles in various events in PRC history. Tan Zhenlin (term 1949–1952), the inaugural Party Secretary, was one of the leading voices against Mao's Cultural Revolution during the so-called February Countercurrent of 1967. Jiang Hua (term 1956–1968), was the "chief justice" on the Special Court in the case against the Gang of Four in 1980. Three provincial Party Secretaries since the 1990s have gone onto prominence at the national level. They include CPC General Secretary and President Xi Jinping (term 2002–2007), National People's Congress Chairman and former Vice-Premier Zhang Dejiang (term 1998–2002), and Zhao Hongzhu (term 2007–2012), the Deputy Secretary of the Central Commission for Discipline Inspection, China's top anti-corruption body. Of Zhejiang's fourteen Party Secretaries since 1949, none were native to the province.

Zhejiang was home to Chiang Kai-shek and many high-ranking officials in the Kuomintang, who fled to Taiwan in 1949 after losing the Civil War.

== Economy ==
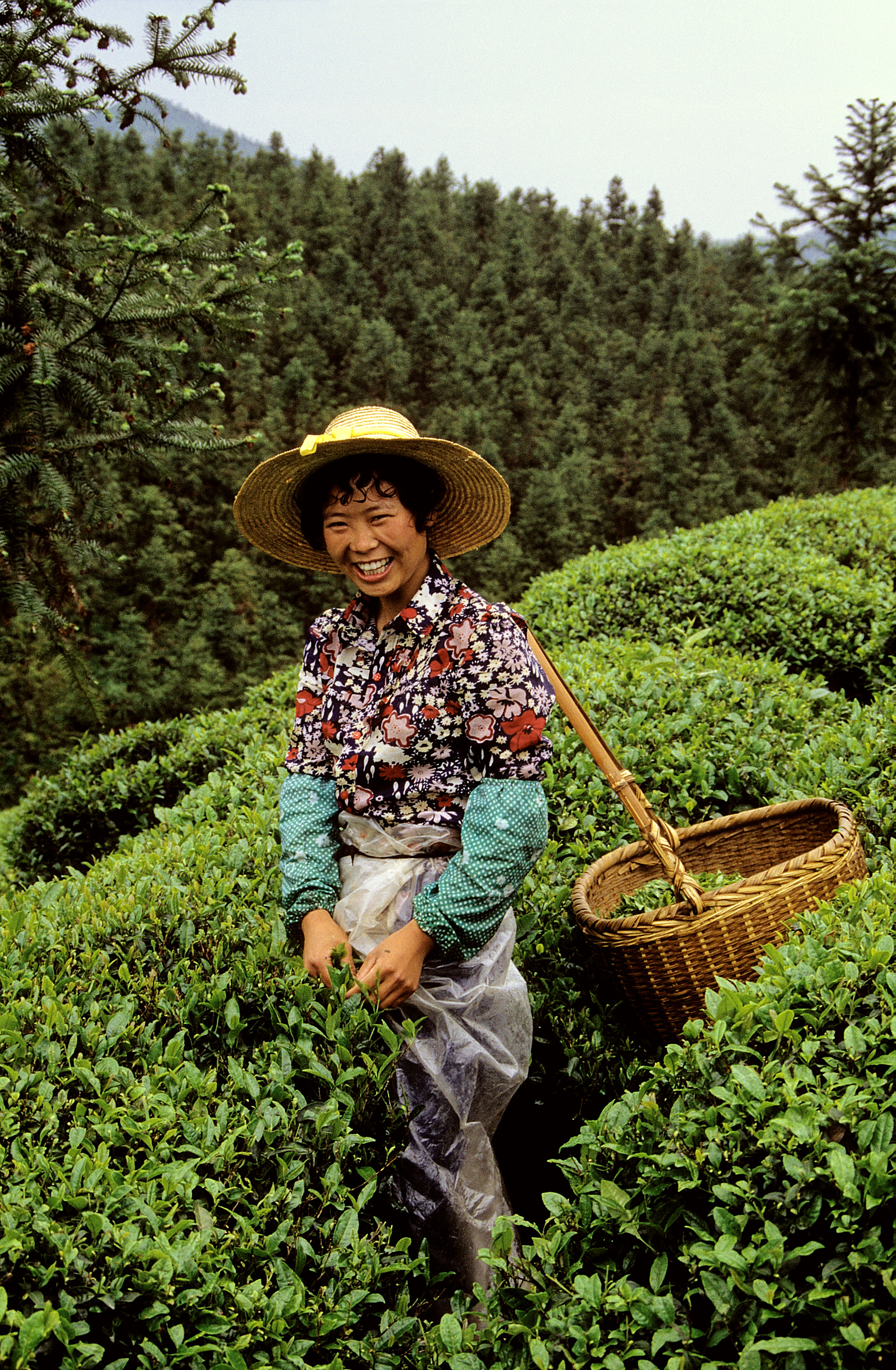
Harvesting tea leaves, Zhejiang province, May 1987

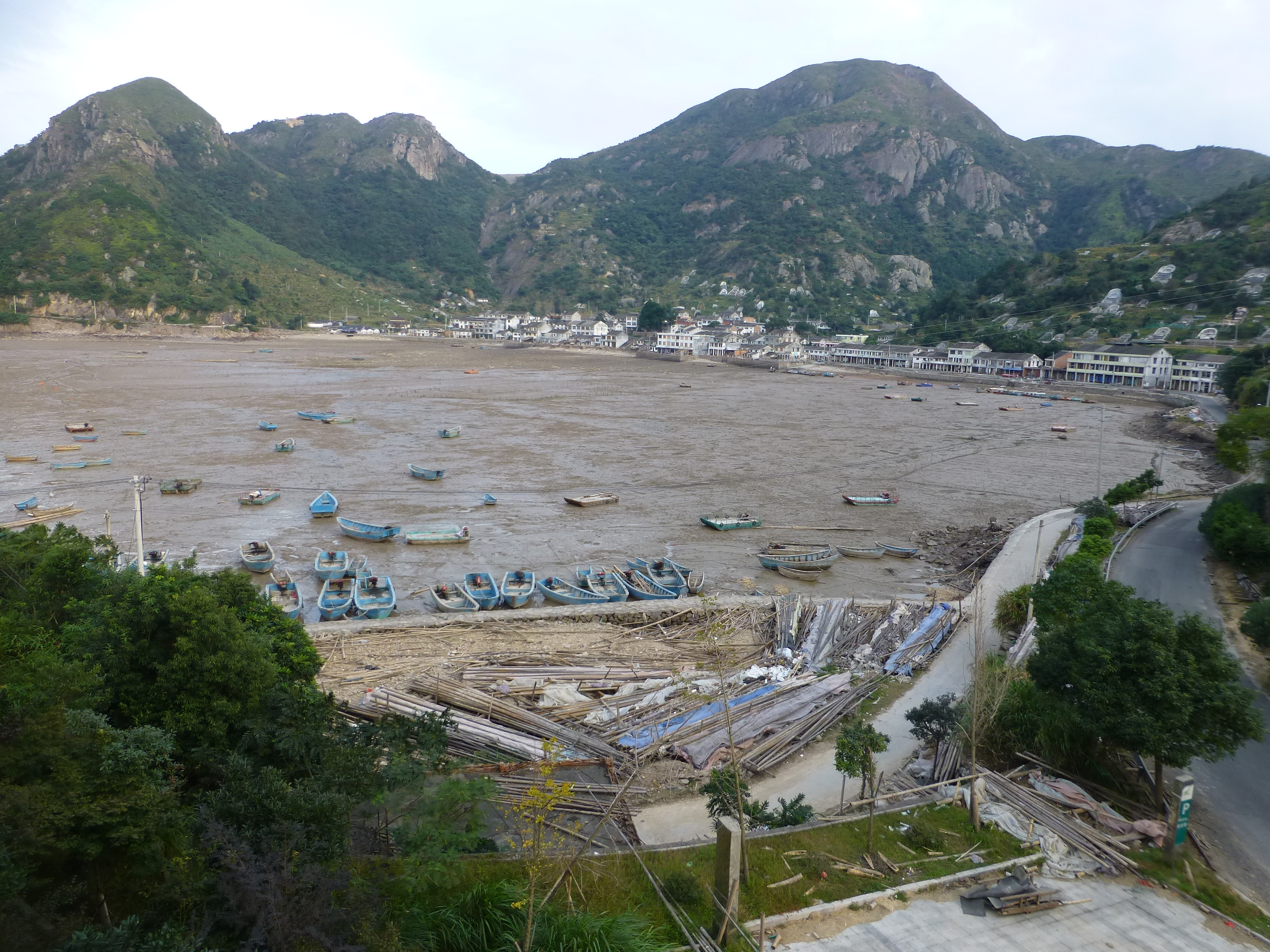
Yu'ao, a fishing village on Dayu Bay in South Zhejiang (Cangnan County)

Zhejiang is one of the richest and most developed provinces in China. As of 2022, its nominal GDP was US$1.15 trillion (CN¥ 7.77 trilion), about 6.42% of the country's GDP and ranked 4th among province-level administrative units; the province's primary, secondary and tertiary industries were worth CN¥232.48 billion (US$34.56 billion), CN¥3.3205 trillion (US$493.67 billion) and CN¥4.2185 trillion (US$627.18 billion) respectively. Its nominal GDP per capita was US$17,617 (CN¥118,496) and ranked the 6th in the country. The private sector in the province has been playing an increasingly important role in boosting the regional economy since reform and opening up in 1978. Zhejiang is generally regarded as having one of the strongest private sectors among Chinese provinces and its local governments typically adopt permissive business policies.

Zhejiang's main manufacturing sectors are electromechanical industries, textiles, chemical industries, food and construction materials. In recent years Zhejiang has followed its own development model, dubbed the "Zhejiang model", which is based on prioritizing and encouraging entrepreneurship, an emphasis on small businesses responsive to the whims of the market, large public investments into infrastructure, and the production of low-cost goods in bulk for both domestic consumption and export. As a result, Zhejiang has made itself one of the richest provinces and the "Zhejiang spirit" has become something of a legend within China. However, some economists now worry that this model is not sustainable, in that it is inefficient and places unreasonable demands on raw materials and public utilities, and also a dead end, in that the myriad small businesses in Zhejiang producing cheap goods in bulk are unable to move to more sophisticated or technologically more advanced industries. The economic heart of Zhejiang is moving from North Zhejiang, centered on Hangzhou, southeastward to the region centered on Wenzhou and Taizhou. The per capita disposable income of urbanites in Zhejiang reached 55,574 yuan (US$8,398) in 2018, an annual real growth of 8.4%. The per capita disposable income of rural residents stood at 27,302 yuan (US$4,126), a real growth of 9.4%.

Historical GDP of Zhejiang for 1978–present (purchasing power parity of Chinese Yuan, as Int'l. dollar based on IMF WEO April 2023)
| year | GDP | | | | GDP per capita (GDPpc) based on mid-year population | | | Reference index | |
| year | GDP in millions | | | real growth (%) | GDPpc | | | exchange rate 1 foreign currency to CNY | |
| year | CNY | USD | PPP (Int'l$.) | real growth (%) | CNY | USD | PPP (Int'l$.) | USD 1 | Int'l$. 1 (PPP) |
| 2022 | 7,771.54 | 1,115,543 | 1,925,555 | 3.1 | 118,496 | 17,617 | 29,360 | 6.7261 | 4.036 |
| 2021 | 7,404.08 | 1,114,765 | 1,772,583 | 8.7 | 113,839 | 17,645 | 27,254 | 6.4515 | 4.177 |
| 2020 | 6,468.91 | 937,717 | 1,526,046 | 3.6 | 100,738 | 14,605 | 23,765 | 6.8976 | 4.239 |
| 2019 | 6,246.20 | 900,544 | 1,472,813 | 6.8 | 98,770 | 14,318 | 23,289 | 6.8985 | 4.241 |
| 2018 | 5,800.28 | 876,520 | 1,371,873 | 7.1 | 93,230 | 14,089 | 22,051 | 6.6174 | 4.228 |
| 2017 | 5,240.31 | 776,135 | 1,252,461 | 7.8 | 85,612 | 12,680 | 20,462 | 6.7518 | 4.184 |
| 2016 | 4,725.40 | 711,410 | 1,184,608 | 7.5 | 78,384 | 11,801 | 19,650 | 6.6423 | 3.989 |
| 2015 | 4,350.77 | 698,537 | 1,123,940 | 8.0 | 73,276 | 11,765 | 18,929 | 6.2284 | 3.871 |
| 2014 | 4,002.35 | 651,551 | 1,064,738 | 7.7 | 68,569 | 11,162 | 18,241 | 6.1428 | 3.759 |
| 2013 | 3,733.46 | 602,283 | 1,018,957 | 8.3 | 65,105 | 10,512 | 17,769 | 6.1932 | 3.664 |
| 2012 | 3,438.24 | 544,672 | 965,527 | 8.1 | 61,097 | 9,679 | 17,157 | 6.3125 | 3.561 |
| 2011 | 3,185.48 | 493,200 | 903,939 | 9.0 | 57,828 | 8,953 | 16,410 | 6.4588 | 3.524 |
| 2010 | 2,739.99 | 404,755 | 823,809 | 11.9 | 51,110 | 7,550 | 15,367 | 6.7695 | 3.326 |
| 2005 | 1,302.83 | 159,043 | 454,264 | 12.9 | 26,277 | 3,208 | 9,162 | 8.1917 | 2.868 |
| 2000 | 616.48 | 74,468 | 225,896 | 11.0 | 13,467 | 1,627 | 4,935 | 8.2784 | 2.729 |
| 1995 | 356.39 | 42,676 | 129,927 | 16.8 | 8,144 | 975 | 2,969 | 8.3510 | 2.743 |
| 1990 | 90.46 | 18,914 | 53,136 | 3.9 | 2,138 | 447 | 1,256 | 4.7832 | 1.712 |
| 1985 | 42.91 | 14,614 | 30,617 | 21.7 | 1,067 | 363 | 761 | 2.9366 | 1.404 |
| 1980 | 17.99 | 12,007 | 12,031 | 16.4 | 471 | 314 | 315 | 1.4984 | 1.500 |
| 1978 | 12.37 | 7,349 | | 21.9 | 331 | 197 | | 1.6836 | |

Zhejiang was the first province to pilot a common prosperity pilot program.

Traditionally, the province is known as the "Land of Fish and Rice." True to its name, rice is the main crop, followed by wheat; north Zhejiang is also a center of aquaculture in China, and the Zhoushan fishery is the largest fishery in the country. The main cash crops include jute and cotton and the province also leads the provinces of China in tea production. (The renowned Longjing tea is a product of Hangzhou.) Zhejiang's towns have been known for handicraft production of goods such as silk, for which it is ranked second among the provinces. Its many market towns connect the cities with the countryside.

In 1832, the province was exporting silk, paper, fans, pencils, wine, dates, tea and "golden-flowered" hams.

Zhejiang has been leading the digital economy development in China, in recent years, the provincial economy has been boosted by the economic surge brought by internet corporations such as Alibaba and NetEase. Alibaba.com was founded in Hangzhou, Zhejiang in 1999 by Jack Ma with 17 co-founders. The company started in Ma's Hangzhou apartment and later became Alibaba Group. Alibaba has been a significant factor in Zhejiang's local economy, mostly due to the digital economy, especially through e-commerce, logistics, fintech, cloud services, and support for small businesses. Hangzhou has been Alibaba's home city and has a broad tech ecosystem. The Chinese government noted that Zhejiang's digital economy was expected to reach four trillion yuan and make up more than 55% of the provincial GDP. Alibaba and Zhejiang also launched programs to help small and medium-sized enterprises digitize their production processes, expand online sales, and connect to larger markets. Collectively, all of these sources indicated that Alibaba did impact Zhejiang when it comes to expanded regional innovation.

Ningbo, Wenzhou, Taizhou and Zhoushan are important commercial ports. The Hangzhou Bay Bridge between Haiyan County and Cixi, is the longest bridge over a continuous body of sea water in the world.

=== Economic and Technological Development Zones ===
- Huzhou Economic Development Zone
- Dinghai Industrial Park
- Hangzhou Economic & Technological Developing Area
- Hangzhou New & Hi-Tech Industrial Development Zone
- Hangzhou Export Processing Zone
- Hangzhou Zhijiang National Tourist Holiday Resort
- Jiaxing Export Processing Zone
- Ningbo Economic and Technical Development Zone
- Ningbo Daxie Island Development Zone
- Ningbo Free Trade Zone
- Ningbo Export Processing Zone
- Quzhou Industrial Park
- Shenjia Economic and Technological Development Zone
- Wenzhou Economic and Technological Development Zone
- Xiaoshan Economic and Technological Development Zone
- Zhejiang Quzhou Hi-Tech Park
- Zhejiang Zhoushan Economic Development Zone
- Zhejiang Donggang Economic Development Zone
- Zhejiang Yuhuan Economic Development Zone

=== Economic and technological development concerns ===
==== Waste disposal ====
On Thursday, September 15, 2011, more than 500 people from Hongxiao Village protested over the large-scale death of fish in a nearby river. Angry protesters stormed the Zhejiang Jinko Solar Company factory compound, overturned eight company vehicles, and destroyed the offices before police came to disperse the crowd. Protests continued on the two following nights with reports of scuffles, officials said. Chen Hongming, a deputy head of Haining's environmental protection bureau, said the factory's waste disposal had failed pollution tests since April. The environmental watchdog had warned the factory, but it had not effectively controlled the pollution, Chen added. In 2011, Alibaba partnered with Zheijang government and local environmental groups to create the 'Clean Water Source Action' where a citizen network intended to improve public participation in water-pollution prevention and support government remediation efforts. Reports indicated that in 2017 Alibaba built networks in collaboration with non-governmental organizations that worked to safeguard the environment and specifically river channels in the area and the experts were brought in, in addition to volunteers who helped to identify pollution cases in the province. Members of the alliance included Alibaba Foundation, Friends of Nature, Institute of Public and Environmental Affairs, Green Hunan, and Beijing Green Foundation. The program also created an online platform for information sharing and public reporting.

== Demographics ==
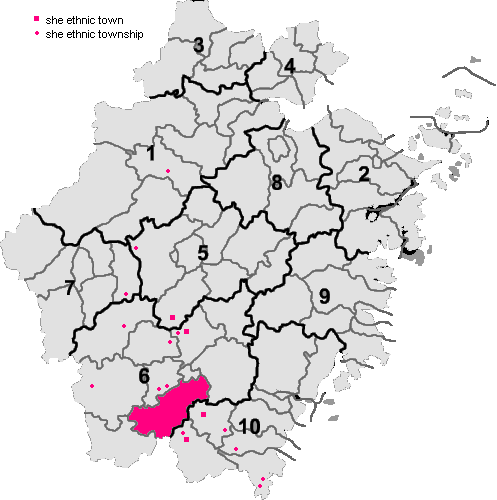
She ethnic county, townships and towns in Zhejiang

Han Chinese make up the vast majority of the population and the largest Han subgroup are the speakers of Wu varieties of Chinese. There are also 400,000 members of ethnic minorities, including approximately 200,000 She people and approximately 20,000 Hui people. Jingning She Autonomous County in Lishui is the only She autonomous county in China.

Historical population

| Year | Pop. | ±% |
|---|---|---|
| 1912 | 21,440,000 | — |
| 1928 | 20,643,000 | −3.7% |
| 1936–37 | 21,231,000 | +2.8% |
| 1947 | 19,959,000 | −6.0% |
| 1954 | 22,865,747 | +14.6% |
| 1964 | 28,318,573 | +23.8% |

| Year | Pop. | ±% |
|---|---|---|
| 1982 | 38,884,603 | +37.3% |
| 1990 | 41,445,930 | +6.6% |
| 2000 | 45,930,651 | +10.8% |
| 2010 | 54,426,891 | +18.5% |
| 2020 | 64,567,588 | +18.6% |

== Religion ==
Religion in Zhejiang (Note: The data was collected by the Chinese General Social Survey (CGSS) of 2009 and by the Chinese Spiritual Life Survey (CSLS) of 2007, reported and assembled by Xiuhua Wang (2015) in order to confront the proportion of people identifying with two similar social structures: ① Christian churches, and ② the traditional Chinese religion of the lineage (i.e. people believing and worshipping ancestral deities often organized into lineage "churches" and ancestral shrines). Data for other religions with a significant presence in China (deity cults, Buddhism, Taoism, folk religious sects, Islam, et al.) was not reported by Wang.)
1. Not religious / Chinese folk religion / Buddhism / Taoism / Confucianism / folk sects (Note: May also include a tiny number of Muslims.) (74.4%)
2. Chinese ancestral religion (23.0%)
3. Christianity (2.62%)

The predominant religions in Zhejiang are Chinese folk religions, Taoist traditions and Chinese Buddhism. According to surveys conducted in 2007 and 2009, 23.02% of the population believes and is involved in ancestor veneration, while 2.62% of the population identifies as Christian, decreasing from 3.92% in 2004. The reports did not give figures for other types of religion; 74.36% of the population may be either irreligious or involved in worship of nature deities, Buddhism, Confucianism, Taoism, folk religious sects. As of the mid-2010s, Zhejiang has 34,880 registered folk religious temples greater than 20 sqm and 10,000 registered places of worship of the five doctrines (Buddhism, Taoism, Catholicism, Protestantism, Islam).

In mid-2015 the government of Zhejiang recognized folk religion as "civil religion" beginning the formal registration of the province's folk religious temples under the aegis of the provincial Bureau of Folk Faith. Buddhism has an important presence since its arrival in Zhejiang 1,800 years ago.

Catholicism arrived 400 years ago in the province and Protestantism 150 years ago. Zhejiang is one of the provinces of China with the largest concentrations of Protestants, especially notable in the city of Wenzhou. In 1999, Zhejiang's Protestant population comprised 2.8% of the provincial population, a small percentage but higher than the national average.

The rapid development of religions in Zhejiang has driven the local committee of ethnic and religious affairs to enact policies to rationalize them in 2014, variously named "Three Remodelings and One Demolition" operations or "Special Treatment Work on Illegally Constructed Sites of Religious and Folk Religion Activities" according to the locality. These regulations have led to cases of demolition of churches and folk religion temples or the removal of crosses from churches' roofs and spires. An exemplary case was that of the Sanjiang Church. Despite English-language media focused on Christian churches, only 2.3% of the buildings affected by the regulations were Christian churches; most of them were folk religious temples.

Islam arrived 1,400 years ago in Zhejiang. Today Islam is practiced by a small number of people including virtually all the Hui people living in Zhejiang. In 2020, there are 117,000 Muslims in Zhejiang. Another religion present in the province is She shamanism (practiced by She ethnic minority).

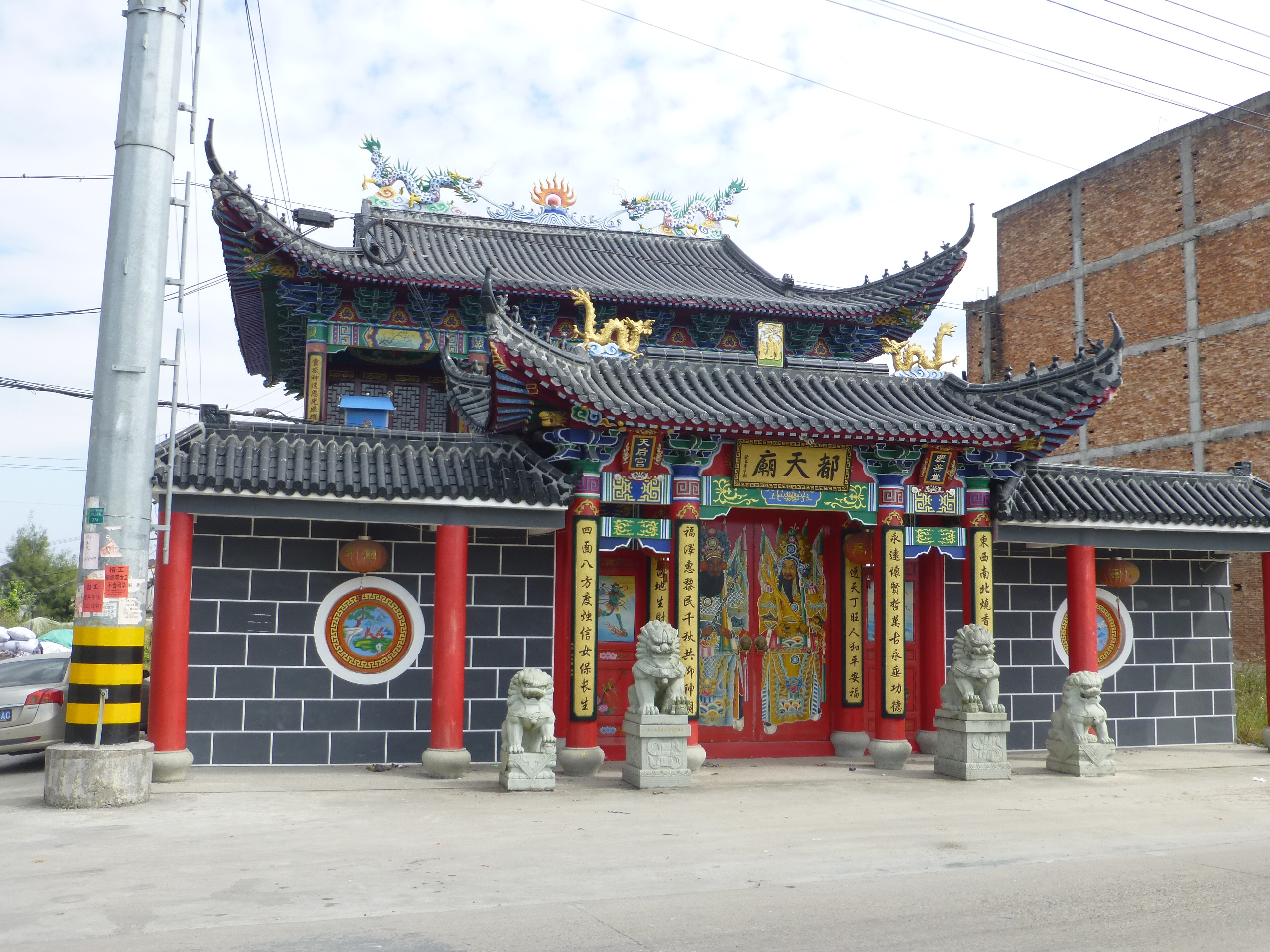
Temple of All-Heaven (都天廟Dōutiānmiào) in Longgang, Cangnan, Wenzhou

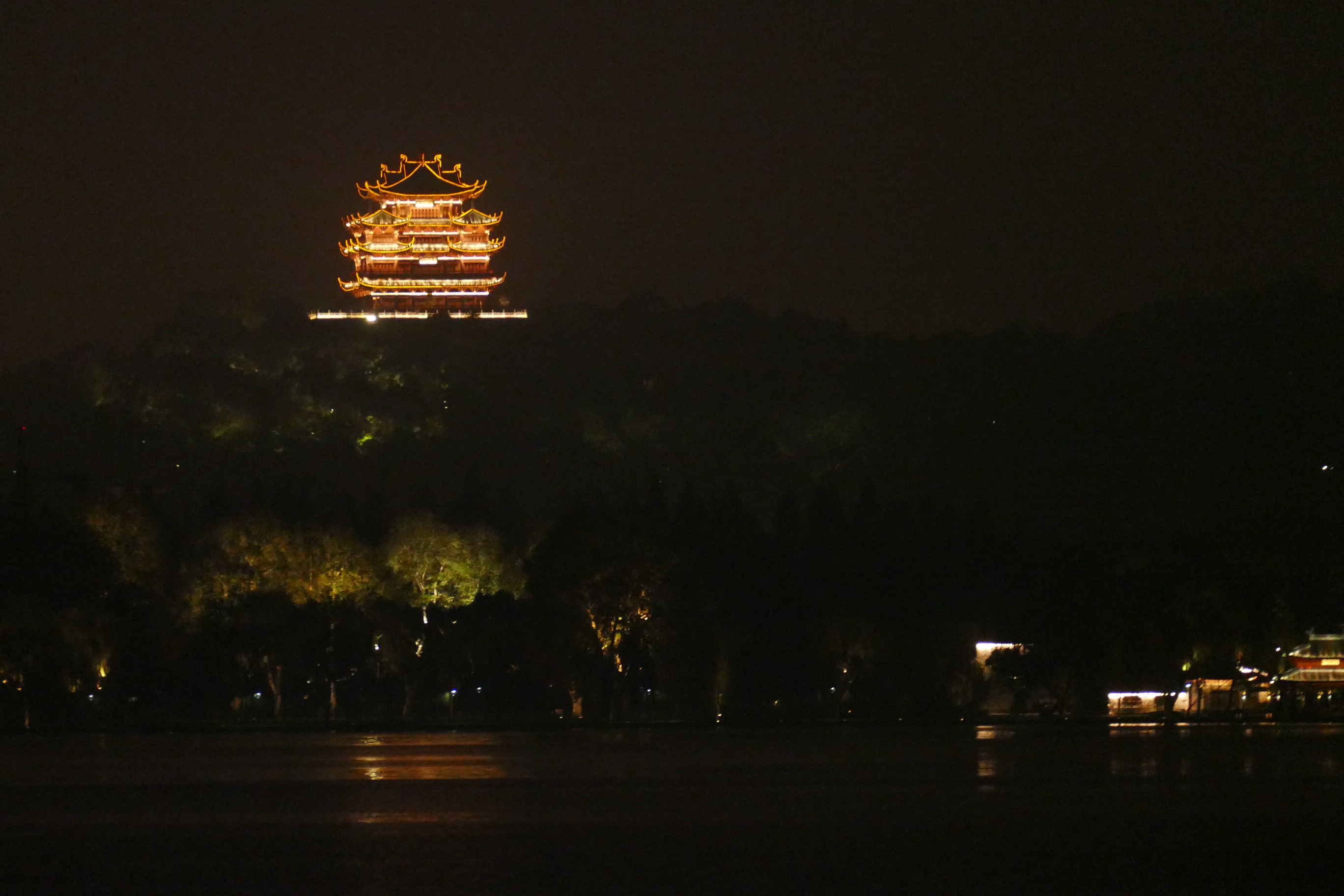
Temple of the Chenghuangshen (City God) of Hangzhou, by night, in Wushan, Xihu

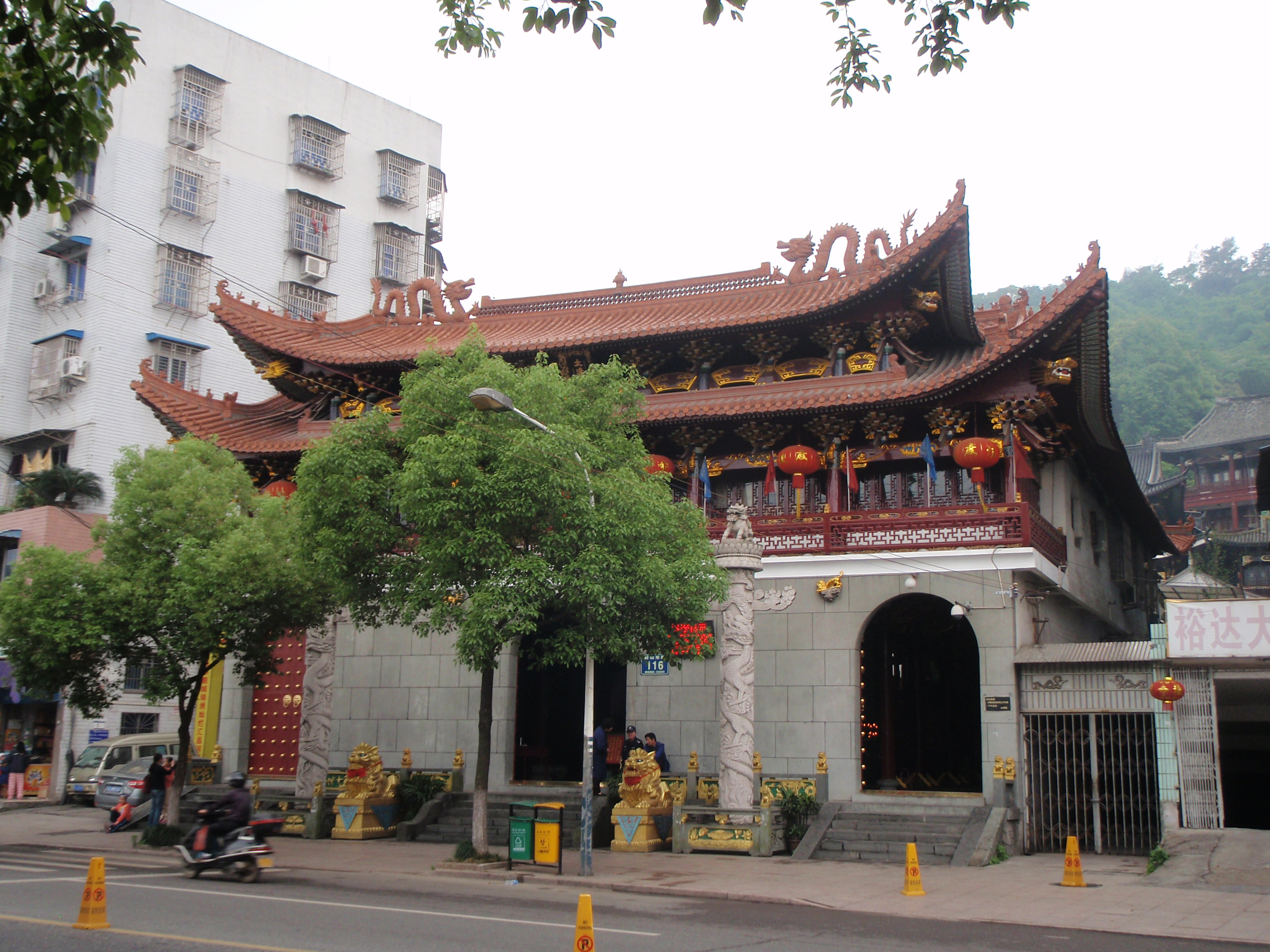
Temple of Bao Gong in Ouhai, Wenzhou

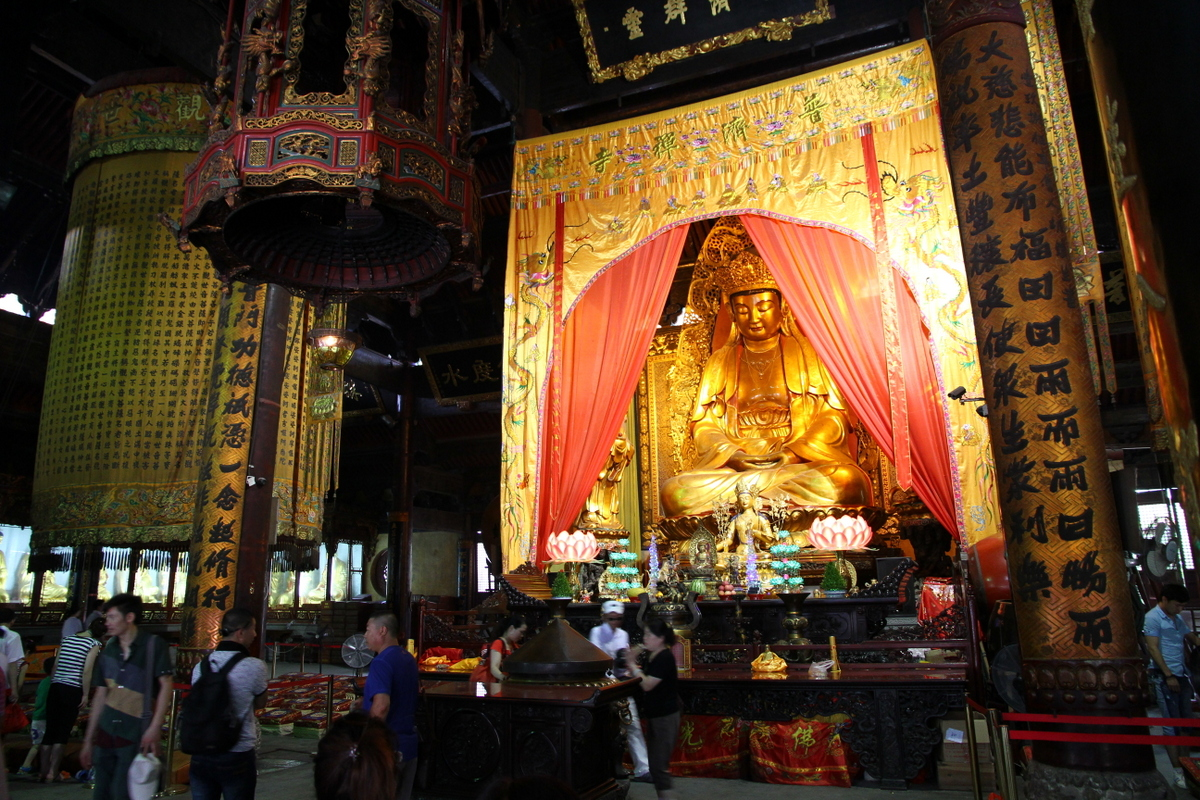
Buddha altar in the Puji Temple of Mount Putuo

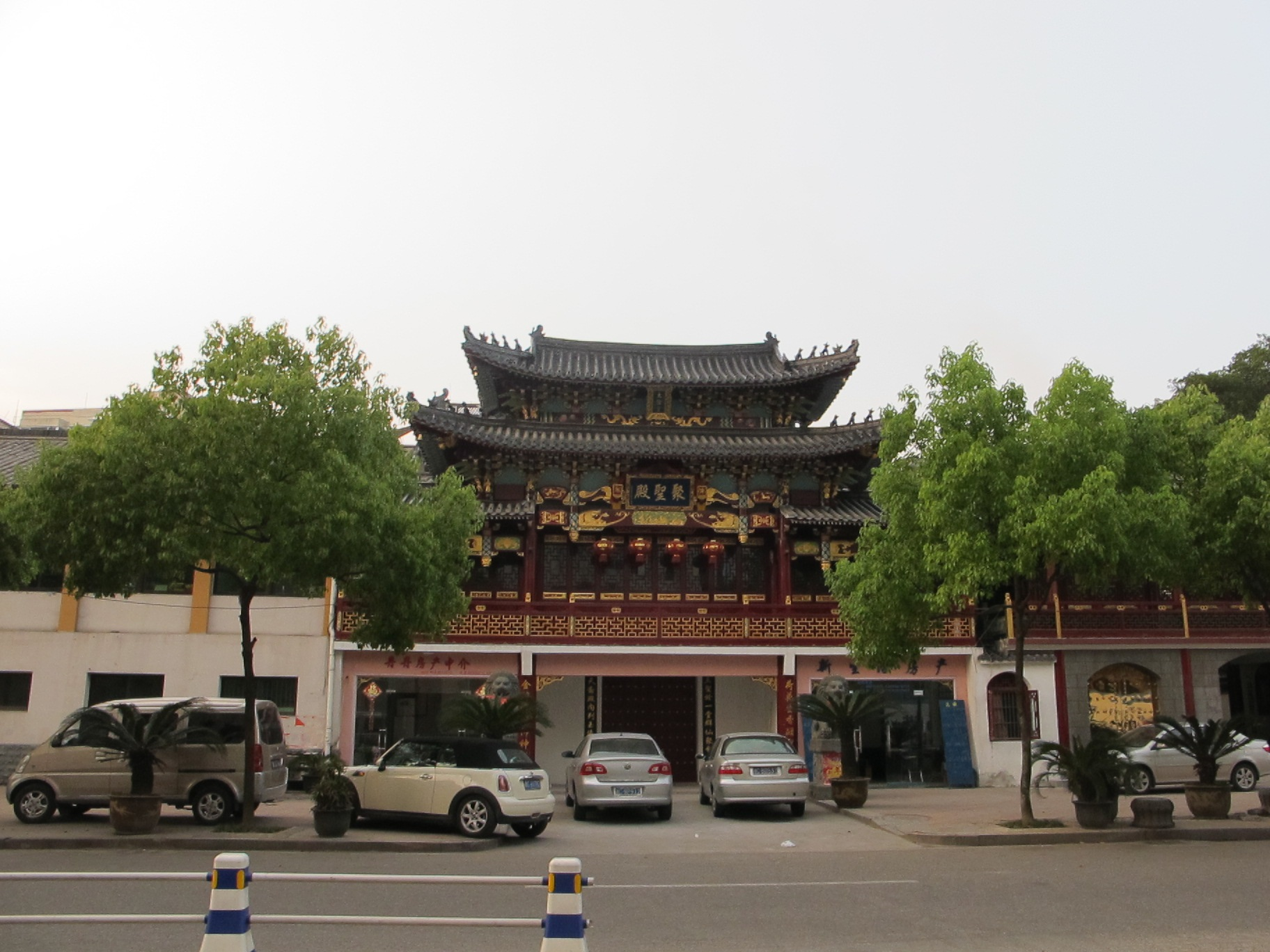
Jusheng Temple in Wuma, Lucheng, Wenzhou

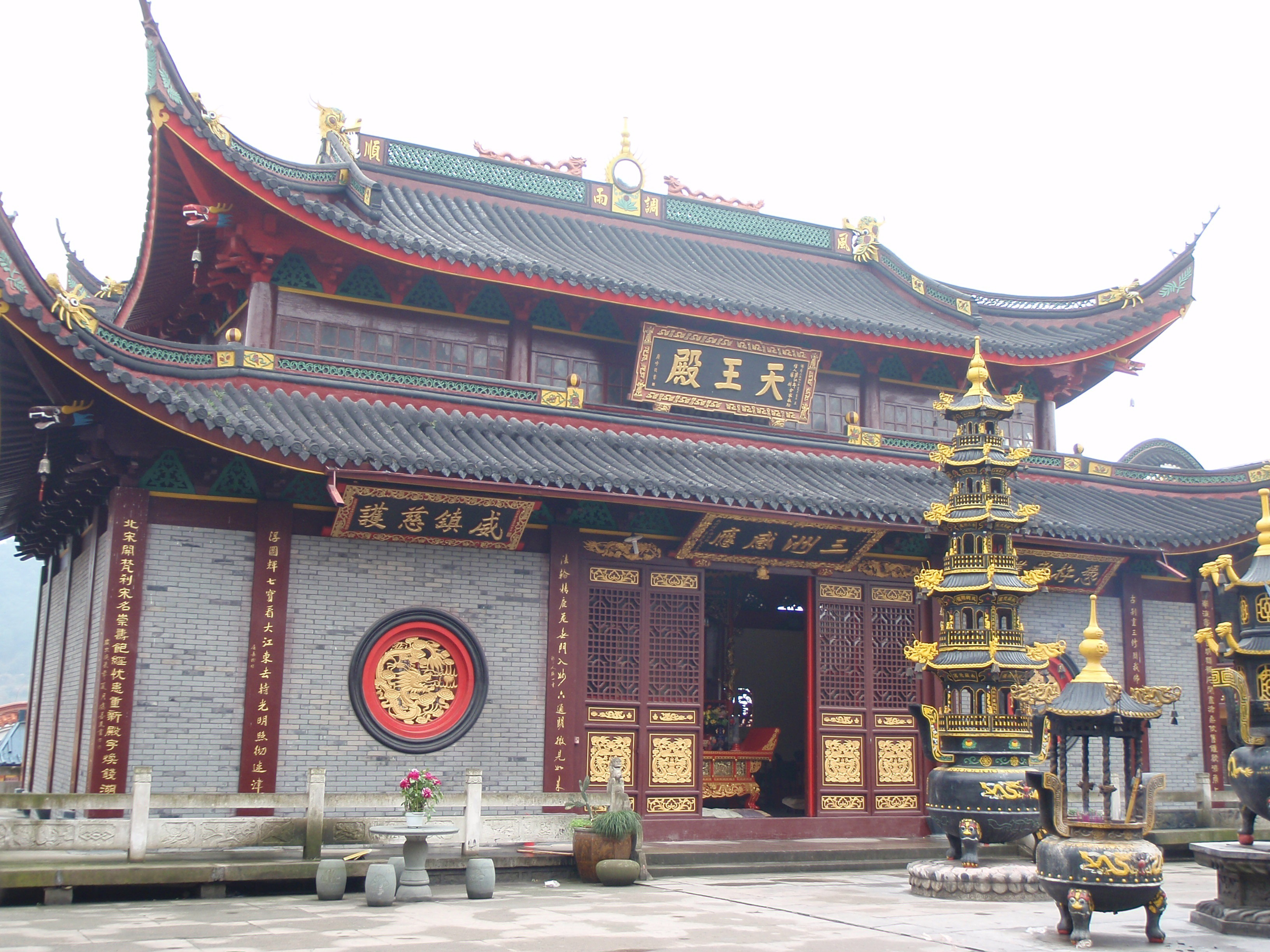
Temple of the King of Heaven of the Little Putuo Buddhist Monastery in Yinzhou, Ningbo

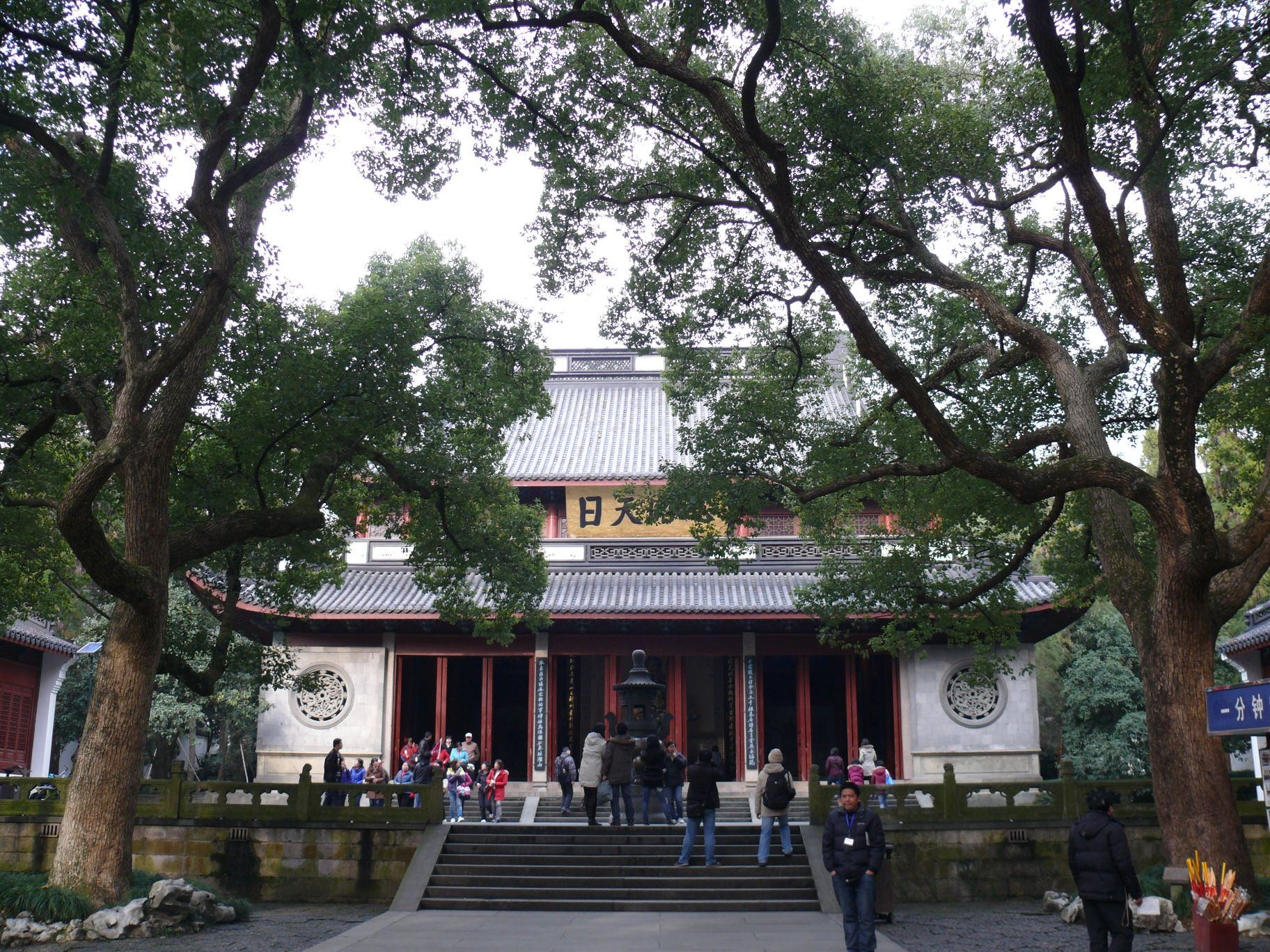
Temple of Yue Fei in Hangzhou

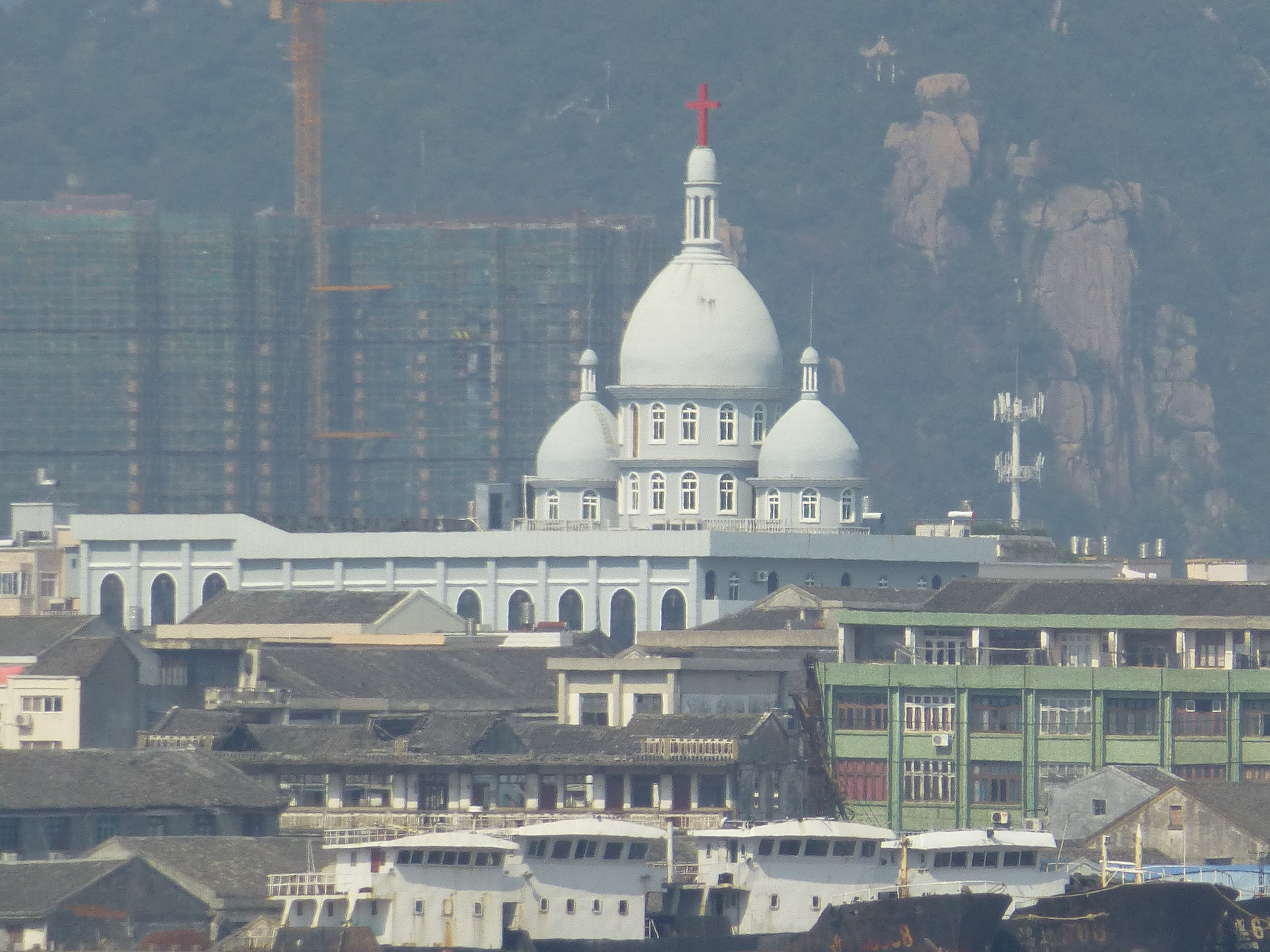
Church in Aojiang, Pingyang, Wenzhou

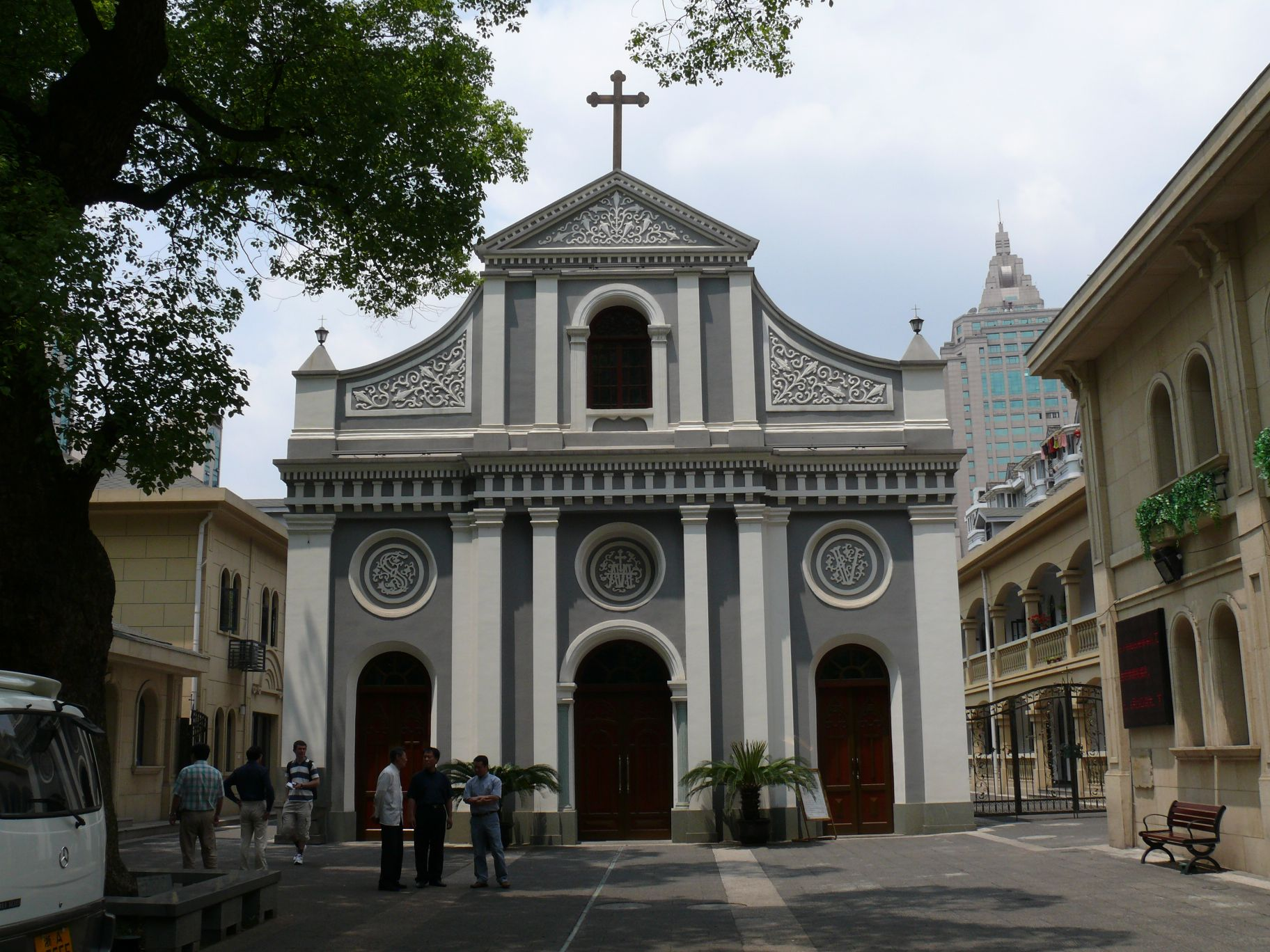
Catholic Cathedral of Hangzhou, Hangzhou

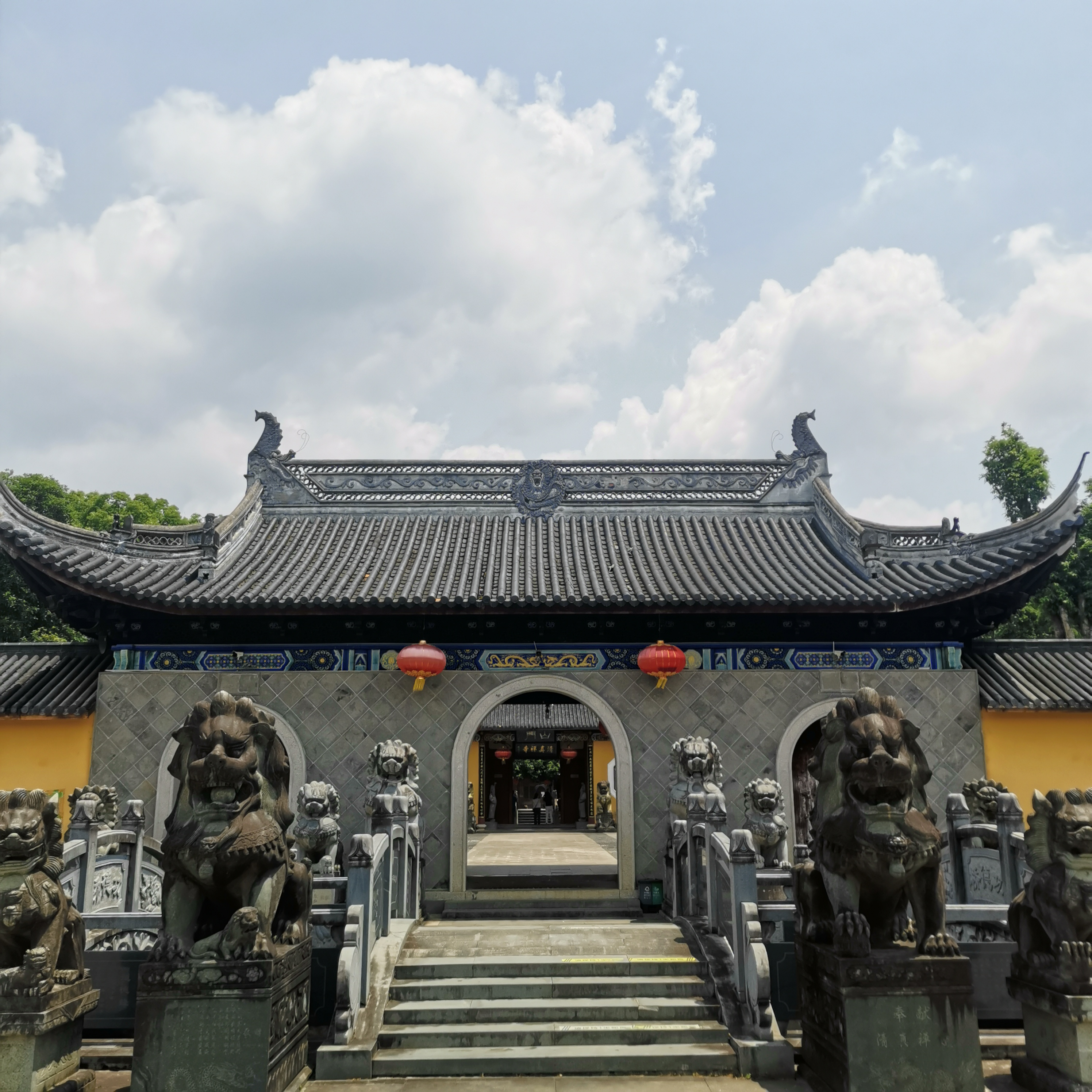
Qingzhen Chan Temple in Qingtian, Lishui

== Media ==
Zhejiang Radio & Television Group, Hangzhou Radio & Television Group, Ningbo Radio & Television Group are the main state broadcasters of Zhejiang.

== Culture ==
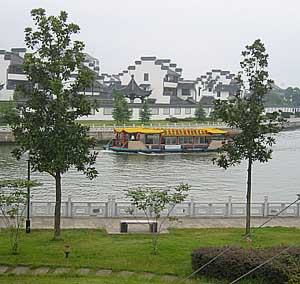
A boat on one of Shaoxing's waterways. North Zhejiang, known as the "Land of Fish and Rice", is characterized by its canals and waterways.

=== Languages ===
Zhejiang is mountainous and has therefore fostered the development of many distinct local cultures. Linguistically speaking, Zhejiang is extremely diverse. Most inhabitants of Zhejiang speak varieties of Wu, but those Wu dialects are very diverse, especially in the south, where one valley may speak a dialect completely unintelligible to the next valley a few kilometers away. Other varieties of Chinese are spoken as well, mostly along the borders; Mandarin and Huizhou dialects are spoken on the border with Anhui, while Min dialects are spoken on the border with Fujian. (See Hangzhou dialect, Shaoxing dialect, Ningbo dialect, Wenzhou dialect, Taizhou dialect, Jinhua dialect and Quzhou dialect for more information)

Throughout history there have been a series of lingua francas in the area to allow for better communication. The dialects spoken in Hangzhou, Shaoxing and Ningbo have taken on this role historically. Since the founding of the People's Republic of China in 1949, Mandarin, which is not mutually intelligible with any of the Wu dialects, has been promoted as the standard language of communication throughout China. As a result, most of the population now can, to some degree, speak and comprehend Mandarin and can code-switch when necessary. A majority of the population educated since 1978 can speak some Mandarin. Urban residents tend to be more fluent in Mandarin than rural people. Nevertheless, a Zhejiang accent is detectable in almost everyone from the area communicating in Mandarin and the home dialect remains an important part of the everyday lives and cultural identities of most Zhejiang residents.

=== Music ===
Zhejiang is the home of Yue opera, one of the most prominent forms of Chinese opera. Yueju originated in Shengzhou and is traditionally performed by actresses only, in both male and female roles. Other important opera traditions include Yongju (of Ningbo), Shao opera (of Shaoxing), Ouju (of Wenzhou), Wuju (of Jinhua), Taizhou Luantan (of Taizhou) and Zhuji Luantan (of Zhuji).

=== Cuisine ===
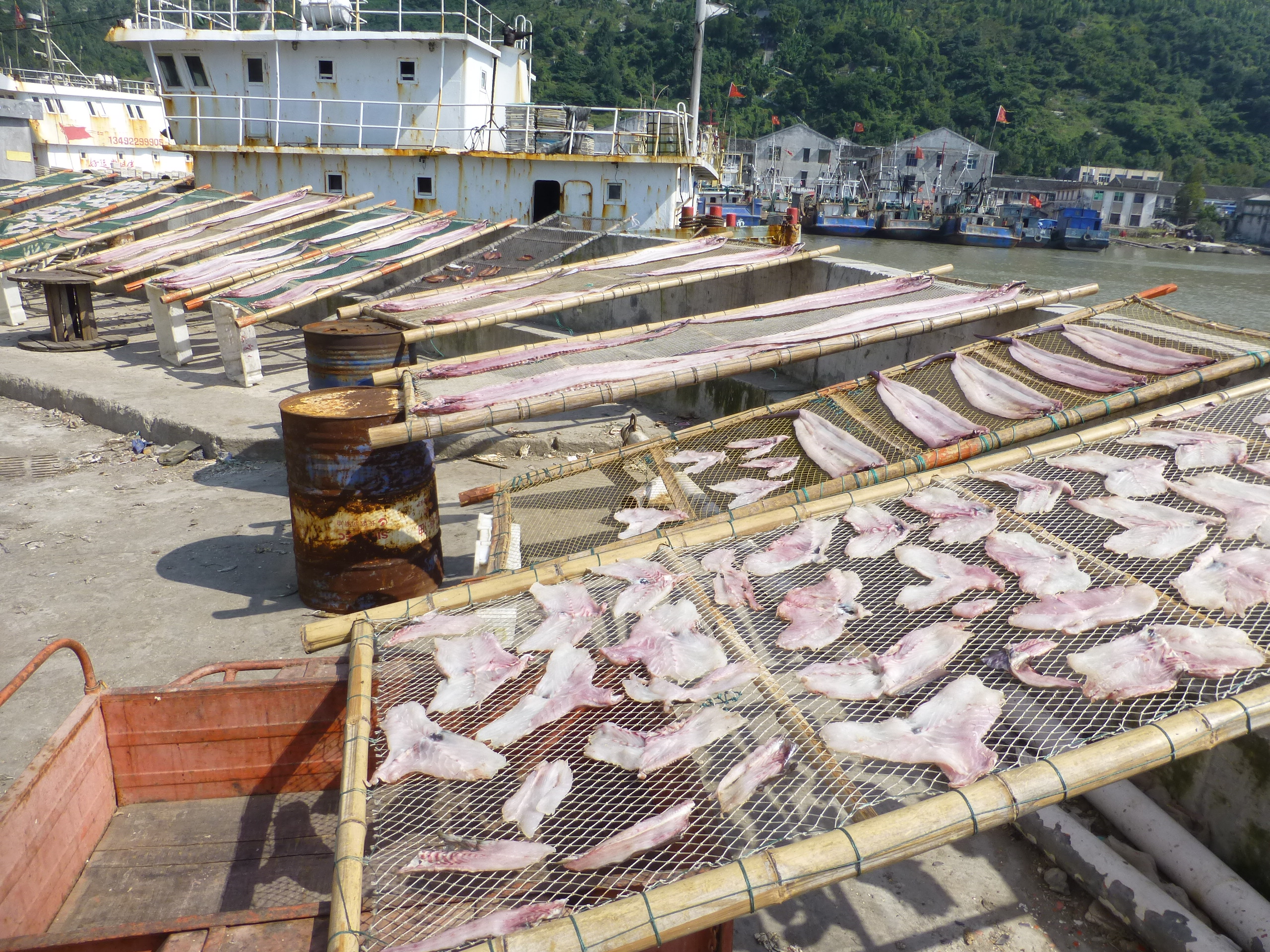
Fish being dried dockside in Pacao Harbor, Cangnan County

Longjing tea (also called dragon well tea), originating in Hangzhou, is one of the most prestigious, if not the most prestigious Chinese tea. Hangzhou is also renowned for its silk umbrellas and hand fans. Zhejiang cuisine (itself subdivided into many traditions, including Hangzhou cuisine) is one of the eight great traditions of Chinese cuisine.

Zhejiang cuisine (Zhe cuisine) is known for its refined preparation, fresh seasonal ingredients, and diverse regional styles. It is traditionally divided into Hangzhou, Shaoxing, and Ningbo styles. Hangzhou-style emphasizes freshness and elegance; Shaoxing favors fermented flavors from its famous rice wine culture; and Ningbo specializes in seafood.

Well-known Zhejiang dishes include:

- West Lake Fish in Vinegar Gravy
- Dongpo Pork
- Longjing prawns
- Beggar's Chicken
- Song Sister Fish Soup

Zhejiang cuisine is considered one of the Eight Culinary Traditions of China. Its influence is prominent in Chinese haute cuisine and continues to gain global recognition.

=== Place names ===
Since ancient times, north Zhejiang and neighboring south Jiangsu have been famed for their prosperity and opulence and simply inserting north Zhejiang place names (Hangzhou, Jiaxing, etc.) into poetry gave an effect of dreaminess, a practice followed by many noted poets. In particular, the fame of Hangzhou (as well as Suzhou in neighboring Jiangsu province) has led to the popular saying: "Above there is heaven; below there is Suzhou and Hangzhou" (上有天堂，下有苏杭), a saying that continues to be a source of pride for the people of these two still prosperous cities.

== Tourism ==
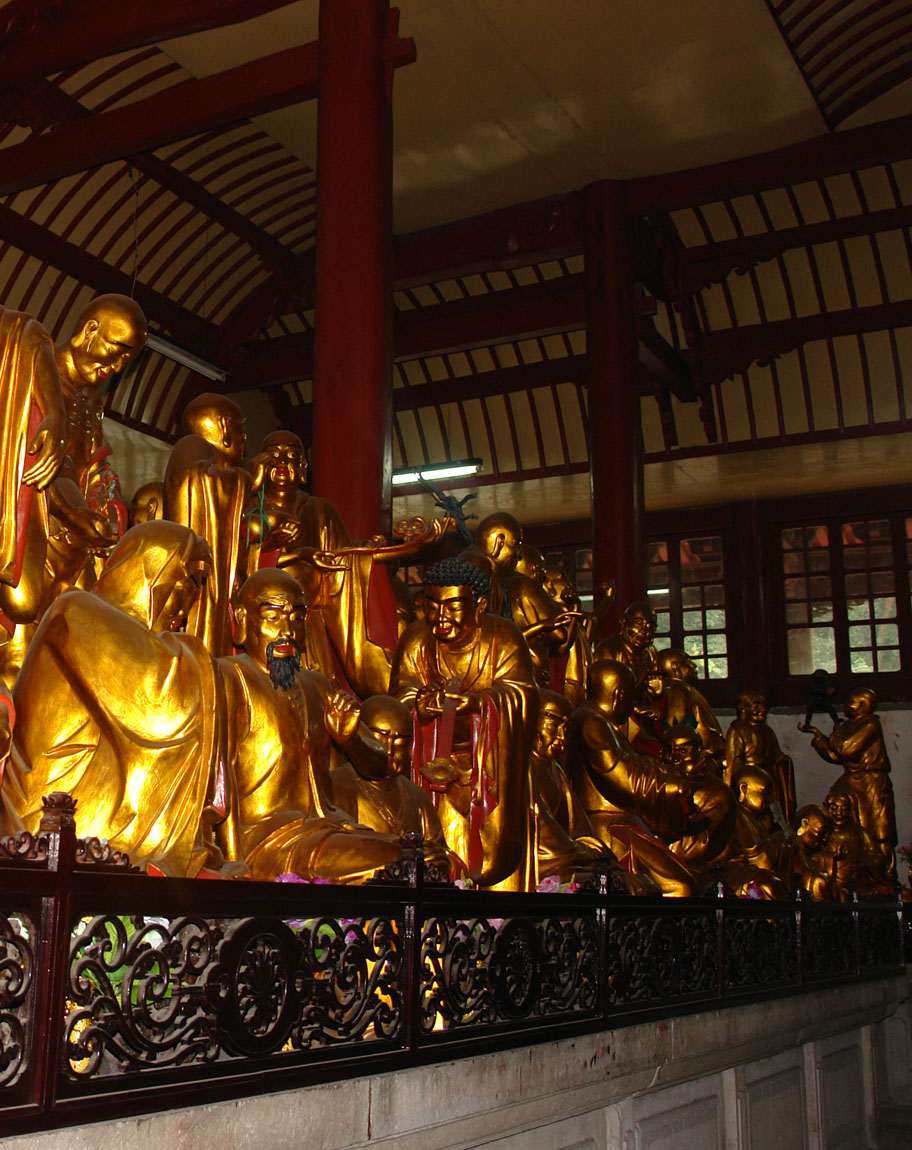
The Hall of Five Hundred Arhats at Guoqing Temple

Tourist destinations in Zhejiang include:

- Baoguo Temple, one of the oldest intact wooden structures in Southern China, 15 kilometers (9.3 mi) north of Ningbo.
- Mount Putuo, one of the most noted Buddhist mountains in China. Chinese Buddhists associate it with Guan Yin.
- Qita Temple, Ningbo.
- Shaoxing, site of the Tomb of Yu the Great, Wuzhen and other waterway towns.
- The ancient capital of Hangzhou.
- Mount Tiantai, a mountain important to Zen Buddhism.
- West Lake, in Hangzhou.
- Yandangshan, a mountainous scenic area near Wenzhou.
- Qiandao Lake, lit. Thousand-island lake.
- Guoqing Temple, founded in the Sui dynasty, the founding location of Tiantai Buddhism
- Mount Mogan, a scenic mountain an hour from Hangzhou with many pre-World War II villas built by foreigners, along with one of Chiang Kai-shek's Kuomintang compounds
- Zhejiang Museum of Natural History, in Hangzhou.
- Taizhou Museum, in Taizhou.
- Lu Xun Native Place, in Shaoxing

== Sports ==
Professional sports teams based in Zhejiang include:

- Chinese Basketball Association
  - Zhejiang Golden Bulls
  - Bayi Rockets (in Ningbo)
- Chinese Super League
  - Zhejiang Professional F.C.

== Education and research ==
Zhejiang is one of China's leading provinces in research and education. As of 2025, three major cities in Zhejiang ranked in the world's top 130 cities (Hangzhou 10th, Ningbo 85th and Wenzhou 130th) by scientific research output, as tracked by Nature Index.

=== Colleges and universities ===
- Zhejiang University (浙江大学; Hangzhou)
- Zhejiang Sci-Tech University (浙江理工大学; Hangzhou)
- China Academy of Art (中国美术学院; Hangzhou)
- Hangzhou Dianzi University (杭州电子科技大学; Hangzhou)
- China Jiliang University (中国计量大学; Hangzhou)
- Hangzhou Normal University (杭州师范大学; Hangzhou)
- Ningbo University (宁波大学; Ningbo)
- University of Nottingham Ningbo China (诺丁汉大学宁波校区; Ningbo)
- Zhejiang A & F University (浙江农林大学; Hangzhou)
- Zhejiang University of Technology (浙江工业大学; Hangzhou)
- Zhejiang Medical University
- Zhejiang Normal University (浙江师范大学; Jinhua)
- Zhejiang University of Finance and Economics (浙江财经大学; Hangzhou)
- Zhejiang Gongshang University (浙江工商大学; Hangzhou)
- Shaoxing University (绍兴文理学院; Shaoxing)
- Wenzhou Medical University (温州医科大学; Wenzhou)
- Wenzhou Teachers College
- Wenzhou-Kean University
- Shaoxing College of Arts and Science
- Zhejiang Institute of Education
- Hangzhou Institute of Electronic Engineering
- Hangzhou University of Commerce
- Hangzhou Institute of Financial Managers

=== International schools ===
- Dingwen Academy Hangzhou (Hangzhou)
- Hangzhou Greentown Yuhua School (Hangzhou)
- Hangzhou International School (Hangzhou)
- Hangzhou World Foreign Language International School (Hangzhou)
- NAS Jiaxing (Jiaxing)
- Ningbo Huamao International School (Ningbo)
- Ningbo Xiaoshi High School (Ningbo)

== Notable people ==
- Wang Yangming: Ming dynasty philosopher
- Su Shi: Poet and writer from the Song era, also known as a government official who contributed to the maintenance of West Lake.

== See also ==
- List of railway stations in Zhejiang
- Archives of Yuhuan
