= Timeline of the Chinese Civil War =

Chronology of 1912–1949 civil war in China

The Chinese Civil War was fought between the Kuomintang-led government of the Republic of China and the forces of the Chinese Communist Party (CCP), with armed conflict continuing intermittently from 1 August 1927 until 7 December 1949, resulting in a CCP victory and control of mainland China in the Chinese Communist Revolution.

The following is a chronological timeline of the history of the Chinese Civil War (1912–1949): (Note: See Timeline of Chinese history for a full timelines of the history of China.)

== Background (pre 1927) ==
Date	Event	Key Figures	Notes
1924–1927	First United Front	Sun Yat-sen (1923–1925); Chiang Kai-shek (1926–1927)	Formed in 1924 as an alliance of the Kuomintang (KMT) and the Chinese Communist Party (CCP) to end warlordism in China. Together they formed the National Revolutionary Army and set out in 1926 on the Northern Expedition.

== First phase: Communist insurgency (1927–1937) ==
From August 1927 to 1937, the First United Front collapsed during the Northern Expedition, and the Nationalists controlled most of China.

Date	Event	Key Figures	Notes
12 April 1927	Shanghai massacre		The violent suppression of Chinese Communist Party (CCP) organizations and leftist elements in Shanghai by forces supporting General Chiang Kai-shek and conservative factions in the Kuomintang (Chinese Nationalist Party or KMT).
24 December 1937–7 April 1947 (Note: The Second United Front was dissolved 7 April 1947. After the end of the Second Sino-Japanese War, Chiang Kai-shek and Mao Zedong attempted to engage in peace talks. This effort failed and by 1946 the KMT and the Chinese Communist Party were engaged in all-out civil war.)	Second United Front	Chiang Kai-shek; Mao Zedong	An alliance between the ruling Kuomintang (KMT) and the Chinese Communist Party (CCP) to resist the Japanese invasion of China during the Second Sino-Japanese War, which suspended the Chinese Civil War from 1937 to 1945.

== Interlude: Second Sino-Japanese War period (1937–1945) ==
From 1937 to 1945, hostilities were mostly put on hold as the Second United Front fought the Japanese invasion of China with eventual help from the Allies of World War II, although co-operation between the KMT and CCP during this time was minimal and armed clashes between the groups were common. Events below are related to the Chinese Civil War during the Second Sino-Japanese War (1937–1945).

Date	Event	Key Figures	Notes
January 1941	New Fourth Army incident		

== Second phase: resumption of civil war (1945–1949) ==
The CCP gained control of mainland China and proclaimed the People's Republic of China in 1949, forcing the leadership of the Republic of China to retreat to the island of Taiwan.

Date	Event	Key Figures	Notes
14 August 1945	Sino-Soviet Treaty of Friendship and Alliance		A treaty signed by the National Government of the Republic of China and the Government of the Union of Soviet Socialist Republics on 14 August 1945.

== See also ==
- Outline of the military history of the People's Republic of China
- Outline of the Chinese Civil War
- Chinese Civil War order of battle
- List of wars involving the People's Republic of China
- List of Chinese wars and battles
- List of wars involving the Republic of China
- List of wars involving Taiwan
- Bibliography of works by Mao Zedong
