= History of the People's Liberation Army =

The history of the People's Liberation Army began in 1927 with the start of the Chinese Civil War and spans to the present, having developed from a peasant guerrilla force into the largest armed force in the world.

== Before the founding of the People's Republic of China ==
Flag of the Chinese Workers' and Peasants' Red Army (中國工農紅軍).

In 1925, the Chinese Communist Party's Central Military Department, was renamed the Central Military Commission (CMC). It was first led by Zhang Guotao who was replaced by Zhou Enlai in 1926 as head of the CMC. At the time, the CMC was concurrently the Shanghai District Military Commission. During the First United Front, it not a unified military command structure but was more of an administrative liaison with other armed communist groups.

The divisions of the "Chinese Workers' and Peasants' Red Army" (中國工農紅軍) were named according to historical circumstances, sometimes in a nonconsecutive way. Early Communist units often formed by defection from existing Kuomintang forces, keeping their original designations. Moreover, during the Chinese Civil War, central control of separate Chinese Communist Party (CCP)-controlled enclaves within China was limited, adding to the confusion of nomenclature of Communist forces.

The 1929 Gutian Congress was important in establishing the principle of party control over the military, which continues to be a core principle of the party's ideology. In the short term, this concept was further developed in the June 1930 Program for the Red Fourth Army at All Levels and the winter 1930 Provisional Regulations on the Political Work of the Chinese Workers and Peasants Army (Draft), which formally established Party leadership of the military.

By the time of the 1934 Long March, numerous small units had been organized into three unified groups, the First Front Red Army (紅一方面軍/红一方面军/Hóng Yī Fāngmiàn Jūn), the Second Front Red Army (紅二方面軍/红二方面军/Hóng Èr Fāngmiàn Jūn) and the Fourth Front Red Army (紅四方面軍/红四方面军/Hóng Sì Fāngmiàn Jūn), also translated as "First Front Red Army", "Second Front Red Army" and "Fourth Front Red Army".

Mao's military thought grew out of the Red Army's experiences in the late 1930s and early 1940s and formed the basis for the people's war concept, which became the doctrine of the Red Army and the People's Liberation Army (PLA). In developing his thought, Mao drew on the works of the Chinese military strategist Sun Zi (4th century BC) and Soviet and other theorists, as well as on the lore of peasant uprisings, such as the stories found in the classical novel Shuihu Zhuan (Water Margin) and the stories of the Taiping Rebellion. Synthesizing these influences with lessons learned from the Red Army's successes and failures, Mao created a comprehensive politico-military doctrine for waging revolutionary warfare. People's war incorporated political, economic, and psychological measures with protracted military struggle against a superior foe. As a military doctrine, people's war emphasized the mobilization of the populace to support regular and guerrilla forces; the primacy of men over weapons, with superior motivation compensating for inferior technology; and the three progressive phases of protracted warfare—strategic defensive, strategic stalemate, and strategic offensive (see Mobile Warfare). During the first stage, enemy forces were "lured in deep" into one's own territory to overextend, disperse, and isolate them. The Red Army established base areas from which to harass the enemy, but these bases and other territory could be abandoned to preserve Red Army forces. In addition, policies ordered by Mao for all soldiers to follow, the Eight Points of Attention, instructed the army to avoid harm to or disrespect for the peasants, regardless of the need for food and supplies. This policy won support for the Communists among the rural peasants.

In June 1946, the Civil War between the Kuomintang and the CCP resumed. On September 12, 1946, the Liberation Daily was the first to use the title of "People's Liberation Army" in its editorial. Subsequently, the title of "People's Liberation Army" appeared publicly many times in articles published by Mao Zedong and Xinhua News Agency. On October 3, 1946, the Liberation Daily formally proposed the title of "Chinese People's Liberation Army" for the first time in the editorial "Struggle for the Realization of the January Armistice Agreement and the CPPCC Resolution". At that time, the People's Daily quoted Xinhua News Agency's telegram that in the Northeast Summer Offensive in May 1947, the "Hebei-Chahar-Rehe-Liaoning People's Liberation Army" (rather than the title of the Northeast Democratic Alliance Army ) captured Weichang County. On October 10, 1947, the "Manifesto of the Chinese People's Liberation Army" was published, which marked the change of the name of the entire army to Chinese People's Liberation Army.

By the beginning of 1948, all units of the army were renamed the People's Liberation Army. The CCP Politburo held an enlarged meeting from September 8 to 13, 1948, proposing to build a 5 million PLA. In accordance with the meeting of the Politburo, the CCP Central Committee and the CCP Central Military Commission issued the "Regulations on Unifying the Organization and Unit Numbers of the Whole Army" on November 1, pointing out that the People's Liberation Army is divided into three categories: field troops, local troops and guerrilla troops. All troops above the regiment level were named "People's Liberation Army of China". On January 15, 1949, the CCP Central Military Commission decided to reorganise the regional armies of the PLA into four field armies.

== People's Republic of China ==
In the PRC's early years, the PLA was a dominant foreign policy institution in the country.

In 1950, the Central Organization Department transferred its responsibility for PLA cadre management to the PLA General Cadre Department, thereby separating Party and CMC personnel management.

Since the 1960s, China had considered the Soviet Union the principal threat to its security; lesser threats were posed by long standing border disputes with Vietnam and India. China's territorial claims and economic interests made the South China Sea an area of strategic importance to China. Although China sought peaceful unification of Taiwan with the mainland China, it did not rule out the use of force against the island if serious internal disturbances, a declaration of independence, or a threatening alliance occurred.

In 1964, the Central Military Commission proposed to abolish ranks in the PLA, stating that ranks were an expression of bourgeois right and hierarchy which led to individualist attitudes, inequality, and a sense of disunity. Ranks were abolished the next year; they remained abolished until they were re-instated in 1988.

=== Cultural Revolution ===
The PLA was divided into two distinct groups: Corps and Regional Forces. The Corp was the backbone of the PLA each one consisted of three divisions and smaller supporting units totalling about 45,000 men. A division in a Corp is in excess of 12,000 men with much heavy artillery and armaments. The Corps were large unit formations that guarded the Sino-Soviet Border and the coastline. Regional Forces include three different types of units: border defence, independent divisions and regiments, and garrisons in cities and counties. Independent and garrison units are lightly equipped forces, smaller than equivalent echelons in the corps. Independent divisions might have less than 10,000 men, without tanks or heavy artillery.

In 1966 there were 13 military regions which were in turn divided into 23 provincial military districts.

Upon the creation of the Red Guards in August 1966, the military districts and garrisons were required to send out numerous cadres from their political departments and units Party committees to serve as propagandists and chaperones to the teenagers. The corps sent political officers to make contact with local Red Guards. On 31 December 1966 the PLA was ordered by Beijing to give “short term military and political training” to Red Guards in schools throughout China.

On 5 October 1966, the Central Military Commission and the PLA's Department of General Political Tasks directed military academies to dismiss their classes to allow cadets to become more involved in the Cultural Revolution. In doing so, they were acting on Lin Biao's 23 August 1966 for "three month turmoil" in the PLA.

On 21 January 1967, Mao Zedong wrote to Lin Biao and ordered the PLA to “support the left.” While the order was issued to all armed forces, the military regions, districts and garrisons were in fact charged with the main responsibility of supporting the left.

The PLA regional forces were ordered to aid the left because the left was too weak to be able to seize power from Party leaders in most areas. The need to support the left gave garrisons and district headquarters power to decide which Red Guard group succussed. The order was largely seen as a failure by Beijing with regional forces failing to enact the orders from 21 January. The PLA regional forces favoured supporting local governments and party incumbents and conservative Red Guard factions while inhibiting radical Red Guard factions.

The Corp leaders were not assigned to political positions during the Cultural Revolution, with only a few expectations. The Corps remained in the control of Beijing in an attempt to remove the PLA from provincial politics. The involvement of the PLA led to its involvement in the politics of the time. The PLA Corp only intervened at the request of Mao Zedong.

On 20 July 1967, Wang Li was kidnapped with the support of the First Hubei Military District Independent Division and members of a Red Guard group known as Million Heros. On 22 July 1967 command of the Wuhan Military Region was transferred to Kong Qingde and Ye Ming by Zhou Enlai. Unit 8199 of 15th Corps was ordered to move into the city of Wuhan. In the following weeks after the Wuhan incident army Corps were ordered to seize control of several military districts from regional forces. On 27 July, the Military Affairs Commission disarmed the First Hubei Military District Independent Division, with its men transferred to a labour camp outside the greater Wuhan area.

In August 1967, the policy of arming the left was given to the PLA by Mao Zedong. The policy was for the PLA to provide arms to the left. The Left according to the Mao were students and workers. By September the number of rifles distributed to organized masses exceeded 40,000. The policy of arming the left would be abandoned on 4 September 1967.

On 5 September 1967 the Central Committee, State Council, Central Military Commission, and Central Cultural Revolution Group empowered the PLA to reestablish law and order. The PLA took control over the government in cities, towns, and villages across China. The PLA also took control of judicial powers and duties. Trials were carried out by the PLA, presided over by the PLA, defendants were sentences by the PLA, and executions were carried out by the PLA.

In early October 1967 Red Guards were told to return to school with the PLA entrusted to enforce the call to return to school. PLA military instructors took over the ideological education from the Red Guard leaders.

From 1967 to 1971, the PLA was the most powerful political institution in China. To stop the turmoil of the early Cultural Revolution, Mao ordered the PLA to engage in the "three supports and two militarizations": support the Leftist masses, support manufacturing production, support agricultural production, and apply martial law with military administration and training of civilians. From 1967 to 1972, the military replaced civilian governments at provincial, district, county, and city levels with Military Administrative Committees. More than 2.8 million PLA officers and soldiers worked as administrators for schools, factories, enterprises, and villages.

The PLA's role resulted in increased civilian-military integration and growth in the number of PLA soldiers to more than 6 million by the middle of the 1970s.

Lin Biao died in an aircraft crash in 1971 (the Lin Biao incident). During the subsequent Criticize Lin, Criticize Confucius campaign, Mao described Lin as a "closet Confucianist", "bourgeois careerist", conspirator, and "ultra rightist". During the campaign, many generals who had been supported by Lin were removed and military programs Lin had implemented were canceled. In 1973, the PLA completed a thorough re-organization. Thereafter, Marshal Ye Jianying handled the PLA's operations in consultation with Zhou Enlai.

=== People’s Liberation Army Leadership during the Cultural Revolution ===
Since 1954, the People’s Liberation Army’s leading advisory body was the National Defense Commission (NDC). The board was led by the State Chairman, whose office was held by Party Chairman Mao Zedong until 1959, when he was succeeded by Vice Chairman Liu Shaoqi at the Second National People’s Congress (This is not to be confused with the Chairman of the Central Committee, a post that Mao continued to hold from June 1945 until his death in September 1976). Liu Shaoqi would hold the seat of State Chairman until he was arrested in October 1968, after which the post of State Chairman was left vacant until the position was abolished in 1975 by the Fourth National People’s Congress. While Song Qingling (served 1968 to 1972) and Dong Biwu (served 1972 to 1975) served as acting heads of state while the post was officially vacant, they were not elected by any National People’s Congress, and their positions were largely ceremonial. Neither held any real power or authority over the NDC or the PLA. The Central Military Commission (CMC) existed concurrently with the NDC, and though state military authority was officially held by the NDC until its abolition in January 1975, in practice the CMC, headed by the Minister of National Defense Peng Dehuai from 1952 to 1959, Lin Biao from 1959 to 1971, and Ye Jianying from 1975 to 1978, held de facto authority over the PLA’s operations. The de facto head of the NDC following Liu Shaoqi’s arrest in 1968 was Party Vice Chairman Lin Biao, who held ultimate PLA authority until his demise in 1971 following the Lin Biao Incident. The seat of Party Vice Chairman was left vacant until August 1973, when the position was filled by Zhou Enlai.

Since Liu was acknowledged as Mao’s successor in 1961, tensions had been building between them. At the Central Party Congress of October 1966, Liu Shaoqi, along with Deng Xiaoping, were identified as representatives of the ‘bourgeois reactionary line’ and subsequently denounced across the country as enemies of the Cultural Revolution. Student rallies across the country emerged against them, such as those organized by the Nankai University students. Liu Shaoqi would remain a party member until his expulsion and arrest in 1968, however, he had already effectively lost command of the NDC before then.

Though Liu Shaoqi and Lin Biao both had extensive military experience, Liu had withdrawn from the PLA to pursue a politically focused career by 1949, while Lin’s career remained centered on the military, himself being one of the Ten Marshals of the People’s Republic of China. Lin Biao would fill in Liu Shaoqi’s old position throughout 1966, having been nominated Vice President as early as April 1966. Thus, while Liu Shaoqi did not officially hold any authority over the PLA, his fall from grace allowed the PLA to involve itself in China’s politics on a scale previously impossible under Lin Biao’s newfound political authority. While Lin Biao did not privately support the denunciation of Liu Shaoqi and Deng Xiaoping, nor did he particularly desire to become Mao’s successor, he ultimately took up the position after Zhou Enlai had successfully withdrawn himself from the nomination.

Lin’s ascension saw much greater PLA involvement in the Cultural Revolution. The initial months of the Cultural Revolution were chaotic and the activities of the Red Guards grew increasingly erratic, with mass political destabilization and factional violence becoming common. Under Lin, the PLA had begun stepping in to suppress radicals and restore order across the country by March 1967.

Following violent border clashes with the Soviet Union on the Ussuri River in March 1969, amidst rising Soviet-Chinese tensions, Lin issued Order Number One in October 1969, which would effectively allow Lin to mobilize the PLA for military emergency without going through Mao. With the PLA becoming increasingly involved in state affairs, Lin’s own prestige and stature began threatening Mao’s. Mao’s displeasure was not subtle: he sought reconciliation with the United States in a possible attempt to disrupt PLA dominance. Many of Lin’s subordinates began plotting against Chairman Mao. Lin Biao’s wife Ye Qun, a member of the 9th Party Politburo, as well as their son, Lin Liguo, a high-ranking officer of the People's Liberation Army Air Force, were notably involved in these plots. How much involvement Lin Biao himself had in organizing the plot remains unclear to this day.

Since 1969, Mao’s speeches had grown increasingly hostile against Lin Biao. Lin Biao’s son Lin Guo, along with many of his subordinates began plotting a coup against the chairman, codenamed Project 571. On September 11, 1971, several assassination attempts were made on Mao’s life. Following the failed attempts, Zhou Enlai declared an investigation of the incidents, and Lin, his son, his wife, and subordinates Liu Peifeng, Deputy Director of the Air Force Command Office, and Yang Zhengang, Lin Biao’s personal chauffeur, attempted to flee to the Soviet Union in the early morning of September 13. The flight crashed near Öndörkhaan in Mongolia on that same day. Everybody on board, including the 4 members of the flight crew, died in the crash.

The death of Lin Biao saw a scaling back of the PLA’s political influence and involvement in the Cultural Revolution, as thousands of officers from all sectors of the PLA, including the Air Force and the People’s Liberation Army Navy, were purged, with many executed. By 1973, with most of Lin Biao’s loyalists removed, PLA underwent a thorough re-organization, with Ye Jianying handling scaled back PLA operations together with Zhou Enlai. The Lin Biao incident and the subsequent sidelining of the PLA led to the rise of the Gang of Four.

=== Border disputes in the 1970s ===
In January 1974, the PLA saw action in the South China Sea following a long-simmering dispute with the Republic of Vietnam (South Vietnam) over the Paracel Islands. The PLA successfully seized control of three disputed islands in a naval battle and a subsequent amphibious assault.

A Sino-Vietnamese War revealed specific shortcomings in military capabilities and thus provided an additional impetus to the military modernization effort. The border war, the PLA's largest military operation since the Korean War, was essentially a limited, offensive, ground-force campaign. The war had mixed results militarily and politically. Although the numerically superior Chinese forces penetrated about fifty kilometers into Vietnam, the PLA was not on good terms with its supply lines and was unable to achieve a decisive victory in the war. Both China and Vietnam claimed victory.

=== Military modernization in the 1980s ===
In 1980, China adopted a new Military Strategic Guideline that envisioned using a combined arms approach and positional warfare to defend against a potential invasion by the Soviet Union.Sino-Soviet relations significantly improved in the early 1980s. In 1984, Deng Xiaoping stated that the People's Liberation Army no longer needed to anticipate an imminent invasion from the Soviet Union.

In 1981, the PLA conducted its largest military exercise in North China since the founding of the People's Republic of China.

In 1984, Deng shifted the PLA's primary mission away from preparing to defend against a Soviet invasion. In 1985, Deng stated that there would be a "strategic transformation" of the PLA to reduce its size and re-allocate resources from it to the civilian economy. Deng announced that the PLA would demobilize 1 million troops.

PLA ranks, having been abolished in 1965, were re-established in 1988.

The Central Military Commission (CMC) modified the Military Strategic Guideline in December 1988. It changed the PLA's strategic focus from a general war to potential "local wars and armed conflict" on the country's periphery. Because these potential conflicts would not necessarily be against a nuclear superpower, this change also triggered a debate among Chinese policymakers and strategists over the role of nuclear weapons in Chinese military strategy.

Sino-Vietnamese conflicts at the border continued throughout the 1980s.

=== 1990s ===
Observing the 1990-1991 Gulf War, Chinese strategists concluded that the conflict demonstrated that advances in military technology had shifted the focus of war from occupying territory or annihilating an opposing force to destruction of an enemy's "comprehensive power". In January 1993, the PLA revised its Military Strategic Guideline to focus on "local wars under high-tech conditions" and "strategic deterrence" to prevent the outbreak of war.

In 1992, Yang Shangkun and Yang Baibing called for the PLA to support to protect Deng's reforms by safeguarding him on his southern tour. In doing so, they acted without approval from the Party Central or Jiang Zemin, who was the head of the CMC. Some viewed the Yang brothers as overstepping civilian/military boundaries, and this contributed to their removal from power over the military.

China–Vietnam relations normalized in the early 1990s and in 1993 the PLA began large-scale demining campaigns at the border.

During the 1999 NATO bombing of Yugoslavia, the United States bombed the Chinese embassy in Belgrade. Believing that the bombing was intentional, Chinese leadership worried that China was significantly lacking in leverage against the United States. In an emergency Politburo meeting on 8 May 1999, Jiang Zemin instructed the CMC to strengthen the PLA to prevent future attacks on Chinese interests. Among the measures China took to close its lack in leverage with the United States were efforts to develop precision missiles and accelerating plans to expand conventional missile forces. China increased military funding, including to speed up the weapons development program Project 995.

=== 2015-2016 reorganization ===
The "deepening national defense and military reform" was announced in November 2015 at a plenary session of the Central Military Commission (CMC)'s Central Leading Group for Military Reform.

In 2016, the four traditional departments of the military were replaced by 15 new departments, commissions, and offices led by the CMC.

On 1 February 2016, China replaced its system of seven military regions with newly established Theater Commands: Northern, Southern, Western, Eastern, and Central. In the prior system, operations were segmented by military branch and region. In contrast, each Theater Command is intended to function as a unified entity with joint operations across different military branches.

== Timeline ==
=== The Ten-Year Civil War (1927–1937) ===
- 1927: Nanchang Uprising / Autumn Harvest Uprising / Guangzhou Uprising
- Kuomintang campaigns against the Jiangxi Soviet:

- November 1930 to December 1931: First Encirclement Campaign against Jiangxi Soviet
- April to May 1931: Second Encirclement Campaign against Jiangxi Soviet
- July 1931: Third Encirclement Campaign against Jiangxi Soviet
- December 1932 to March 1933: Fourth Encirclement Campaign against Jiangxi Soviet
- September 1933 to October 1934: Fifth Encirclement Campaign against Jiangxi Soviet

- 1934–1936: The Long March, a strategic retreat to avoid destruction by the Nationalist armies of Chiang Kai-shek
- 1935: Battle at the Luding Bridge

=== Second Sino-Japanese War (1937–1945) ===
- 1937 to 1945: Second Sino-Japanese War

- September 25, 1937: The Battle of Pingxingguan
- January 1940: The New Fourth Army Incident
- August–December 1940: The Hundred Regiments Offensive

=== Chinese Civil War (1945–1950) ===
- 1945 to 1950: Chinese Civil War against the Kuomintang:

- September 10, 1945 to October 12, 1945 – Shangdang Campaign
- October 22, 1945 to November 2, 1945 – Handan Campaign
- December 17, 1946 to April 1, 1947 – Linjiang Campaign
- May 13, 1947 to July 1, 1947 – Summer Offensive of 1947 in Northeast China
- September 14, 1947 to November 5, 1947 – Autumn Offensive of 1947 in Northeast China
- October 10, 1947 - Eighth Route Army and New Fourth Army reorganised into the People's Liberation Army
- December 15, 1947 to March 15, 1948 – Winter Offensive of 1947 in Northeast China
- May 23, 1948 to October 19, 1948 – Siege of Changchun
- September 12, 1948 to November 12, 1949 – Liaoshen Campaign
- October 7, 1948 to November 15, 1948 – Battle of Jinzhou
- November 6, 1948 to January 10, 1949 – Huaihai Campaign
- November 29, 1948 to January 31, 1949 – Pingjin Campaign
- October 25, 1949 to October 27, 1949 – Battle of Kuningtou
- November 3, 1949 to November 5, 1949 – Battle of Denbu Island
- March 3, 1950 to March 3, 1950 – Battle of Nan'ao Island
- May 12, 1950 to June 2, 1950 – Shanghai Campaign
- May 25, 1950 to August 7, 1950 – Wanshan Archipelago Campaign
- August 9, 1950 to August 9, 1950 – Battle of Nanpéng Island

=== People's Republic of China (since 1949) ===
==== Taiwan Strait (aftermath of the civil war) ====
- 1952 to 1996: Taiwan Strait conflicts with the Republic of China (Taiwan):

- April 11, 1952 to April 15, 1952 – Battle of Nanri Island
- September 20, 1952 to October 20, 1952: Battle of Nanpēng Archipelago
- August 1954 to May 1955: The First Taiwan Strait Crisis

- January 18, 1955 to January 20, 1955: Battle of Yijiangshan Islands

- August 23 to October 6, 1958: Second Taiwan Strait Crisis
- July 21, 1995 to March 23, 1996: Third Taiwan Strait Crisis

==== 1949–1979 ====
- October 19, 1950: The Battle of Chamdo
- December 1951 to 1953: Korean War (under the official banner of the Chinese People's Volunteers, although they are PLA regulars)
- 1956 to 1959: Suppression of the Tibetan resistance movement
- October 20, 1962 to November 21, 1962: Sino-Indian War
- September 11, 1967 to October 1, 1967: Nathu La and Cho La clashes
- 1969 to 1978: Sino-Soviet border conflict
- January 17 to January 19, 1974: Battle of Hoang Sa, a sea battle with the Republic of Vietnam Navy near the disputed Paracel Islands
- February 17 to March 16, 1979: Sino-Vietnamese War

==== Military modernization (1980s) ====
- September 14–18, 1981: North China Military Exercise, the largest military exercise since the founding of People's Republic of China in 1949
- 1985: Deng Xiaoping downsized the PLA significantly and demobilized around 1 million soldiers
- 1986: Border skirmishes with Vietnam
- May 20 to June 9, 1989: People's Liberation Army at Tiananmen Square protests of 1989 the Tiananmen Square protests of 1989.
- April 1, 2001: Hainan Island incident, a Chinese People's Liberation Army Navy jet intercepting a US Navy reconnaissance aircraft collides with the US plane. The Chinese pilot is marked missing in action (but assumed dead), while the crew of the US reconnaissance is detained by Chinese authorities, and released shortly after.

== See also ==
- Outline of the military history of the People's Republic of China
- Outline of the Chinese Civil War
- Timeline of the Chinese Civil War
- Military history of China (pre-1911)
- Naval history of China
- Revolution in Military Affairs (RMA)
- People's Republic of China military reform
