= Battle of Nanpeng Island =

1950 battle during the Chinese Civil War

Coordinates: 21.55°N 112.20°E

- Part of the Chinese Civil War
Date	9 August 1950
Location	Nanpeng Island
Result	People's Republic of China victory
Territorial changes	People's Republic of China captures Nanpeng Island

Belligerents
Republic of China (Taiwan)	People's Republic of China

Commanders and leaders
?	?

Strength
421 soldiers	More than 1,000 soldiers

Casualties and losses
Entire army killed or captured	Light casualties

The Battle of Nanpeng Island (Chinese: 南鵬島戰鬥) was fought between the Chinese Nationalists and the Chinese Communists. After Guangdong fell into communist hands, a detachment of the Nationalist troops held out on Nanpeng Island of Yangjiang. This remnant of the Nationalist forces proved to be a major headache the Communists because the island is strategically located between the Pearl River mouth and the Qiongzhou Strait, controlling the shipping line that was vital to the local economy.

The Communists decided to rid of the Nationalist forces and take the island. In the morning of 9 August 1950, the third battalion of the 364th regiment of the 41st Army of the People's Liberation Army attacked the island. After two hours of fighting, the entire Nationalist garrison of Nanpeng Island of 421 was lost and the island was firmly in the Communist hands. The Communists succeeded in capturing one motorized vessel, twenty junks, one artillery piece, ten machine guns, and another 194 firearms.

The Nationalists did not have any chance against the overwhelming enemy because the island is located too far away from any friendly bases. In the event of breaking out of the battle, no Nationalist reinforcement could reach the island in time. The local commanders had repeatedly asked the permission to withdraw to Taiwan but their pleas were ignored due to political reasons because holding out at the enemy's doorstep far away from any friendly bases had very significant symbolic meaning, but in doing so, the fate of the local defenders was sealed.

== See also ==
- Outline of the Chinese Civil War
- Outline of the military history of the People's Republic of China
- National Revolutionary Army
- History of the People's Liberation Army
- Chinese Civil War
