= Communist warfare =

Soviet soldiers raise the Soviet flag over the Reichstag

According to the ideals of Communism, war is only justifiable if it is waged in favour of the working people, not if its sole goal is territorial expansion or resource gain. Wars of colonialism are considered to be about "exporting" the Capitalist ideals, running counter to the Communist goals. However, bloody revolutions and civil wars, notably the Russian Revolution and the Chinese Civil War, with the objective of converting to Communism are a part of Communism.

Most militaries of Communist nations have been subjected by the Communist party of that country, with many nations' parties considering the military to be a part of the party. In the Soviet Union, the party leader was ex officio the chairman of the Council of Defence.

Despite this, many Communist nations, notably the Soviet Union, have participated in wars of expansionism and annexations. These wars were mostly to increase state power as apposed to spreading the Communist ideals, however. For example, the Winter War and Continuation War were wars between Finland and the Soviet Union in which the latter tried to annex the former in order to increase their power instead of spreading the Communist ideals.

== Doctrine ==
According to Communism, there are only three valid reasons for war or other conflict: Defence, spreading Communism, and a Communist revolution. Any other wars, such as wars for expansion or resource gain, are considered Imperialist Wars, and unjust.

Armed forces are, according to Karl Marx, necessary for the proletariat to retain their freedom, but a traditional ranked system of the military goes against the core principals of Communism, instead having elected leadership in a national proletariat militia. This militia would be fed by conscription, and be made of the workers of the country.

A Communist revolution or Civil War is a core part of Communism, with the final line of the Communist Manifesto being a call for workers to rebel. Because of this, Communism cannot exist without some sort of conflict in order to found a Communist state, unless it wins through an electoral process.

== Communist Warfare by Country ==
=== Afghanistan ===
The majority of the existence of the Democratic Republic of Afghanistan was marked by the Soviet-Afghan War, with it surviving only four months after the collapse of the Soviet Union.

After the Saur Revolution in 1978, the People's Democratic Party of Afghanistan took control of Afghanistan. The guard regiments of the old Afghan army were largely kept by the new DRA, and were used alongside Soviet forces against the Afghan mujahideen during the Soviet-Afghan War.

=== Albania ===
The People's Socialist Republic of Albania was a satellite state of the Soviet Union. Its military was the Albanian Peoples' Army, and was considered to be a part of the Albanian Communist Party. It was fed by conscription, and fought in three wars: World War 2, the Greek Civil War, and Operation Valuable. It was responsible for the Corfu Channel incident, when Albanian fortifications fired on several Royal Navy ships.

=== Bulgaria ===
In 1944, the right-wing dictatorship enstated by a Zveno-led coup that had been instated since 1923 was overthrown by the Soviets after Bulgaria sued for peace with the Allies, resulting in the founding of the People's Republic of Bulgaria in 1946.

The PRB joined the Warsaw Pact in 1955, and the Bulgarian People's Army participated in the Warsaw Pact invasion of Czechoslovakia in 1968.

=== Cambodia ===
The armed forces of Democratic Kampuchea, or the Khmer Rouge, was the Kampuchea Revolutionary Army, or the RAK. It was almost constantly at either near or full war.

The Khmer Rouge was formed in 1967 with a peasants' revolt, and the RAK was formed following a coup in March 1970, which led to the Cambodian Civil War fought between them and the US-backed Kingdom of Cambodia. The Khmer Rouge won the war following their capture of Phnom Penh in 1975, and established Democratic Kampuchea, despite American carpet bombing of Cambodia.

The RAK itself was fed through conscription, and had 140,000 personnel at its peak.

After the establishment of Democratic Kampuchea, the RAK carried out the purge on the people of Cambodia, in which 1.71 million people (2.1% of the population) were murdered between 1975 and 1979. The US did nothing to prevent this until Vietnam invaded Cambodia in 1979.

There had always been border skirmishes between the RAK and Vietnam, but there was no official invasion until 1979. The People's Army of Vietnam, the PAVN, quickly overtook Cambodia, entering Phnom Penh in December 1979, establishing the People's Republic of Kampuchea, or the PRK, the next day.

The armed forces of the People's Republic of Kampuchea were the Kampuchean People's Revolutionary Armed Forces, or the KPRAF, which was formed alongside the PRK in 1979. It was only semi-official, but was fed through conscription and had 172,000 personnel at its peak.

=== China ===
The military of the People's Republic of China is the People's Liberation Army, formed in 1927, during the Nanchang uprising. Its founding started the Chinese Civil War, turning it from a revolution to a real war. The PLA was originally called the Red Army, named after its Soviet counterpart, the Red Army. The Red Army grew rapidly, gaining 195,000 personally in 6 years.

It participated in the Sino-Japanese War in 1937, largely avoiding direct conflict against the Japanese and engaging in guerilla conflict. Following the Japanese surrender in 1945, the Manifesto of the Chinese People's Liberation Army was published, and the million-strong Army was renamed to the People's Liberation Army.

The PLA won the Chinese Civil War in 1949, founding the People's Republic of China. After the War, it underwent great reorganisation, including the establishment of an air force and navy. In 1965, the Central Military Commission undid the rank system until 1988, when the rank system was reintroduced. The last of the Four Modernizations of China turned the PLA into a modern military force with modern weapons.

Today, the PLA is the largest military in the world, but has had no conscription since 1949. It is one of only 9 global militaries to have nuclear weapons.

=== Cuba ===
The Republic of Cuba has had the Cuban Revolutionary Armed Forces, or the FAR, as their only defence force since 1960. However, in its earliest form, the Cuban Army was founded in 1868, during the Ten Years' War.

The Cuban Army served on the side of the allies during the First World War, and in the Battle of the Caribbean during the Second World War. Following the Cuban Revolution, Fidel Castro reorganized the military into the modern FAR.

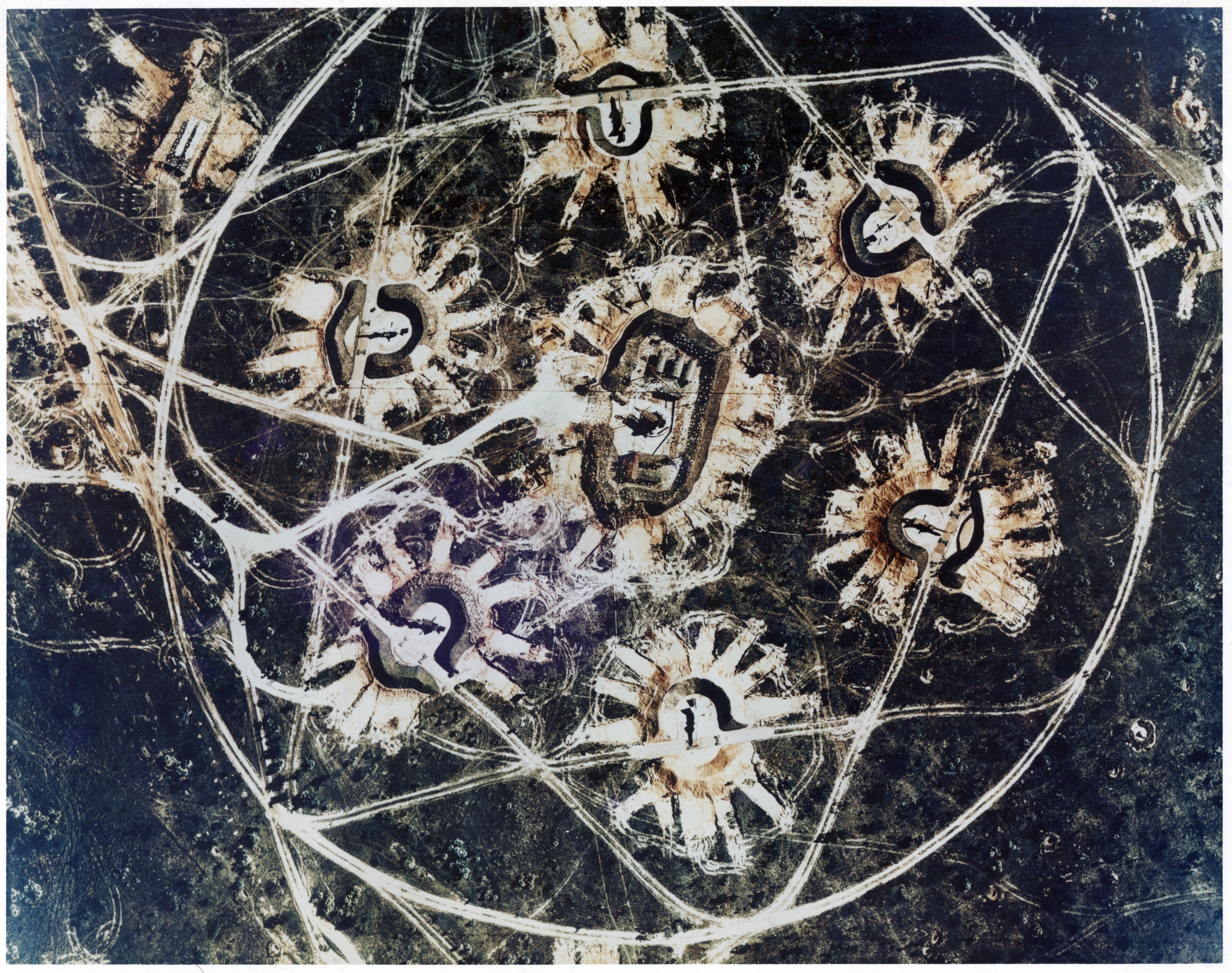
Soviet missile launch sites in Cuba

During the Cold War, the Soviet Union supplied financial and material aid to the FAR, which the United States perceived as a threat due to Cuba's proximity to it. The rising tensions, paired with the discovery of ballistic missiles being shipped to Cuba by a U2 Spy plane, led to the Cuban Missile Crisis of October 1962, in which the world came closer then it ever has to nuclear war. The Cuban military went on full combat readiness, and the US Navy blockaded the island. The crisis was only averted when US president John F. Kennedy agreed with Nikita Krushchev to remove missiles from Turkey in exchange for the Soviet removal of the Cuban missiles.

Aside from the Cuban Missile Crisis, the FAR served in most Soviet proxy wars during the Cold War, including Operation Urgent Fury, the Ogaden War, and the Yom Kippur War.

As with most Communist militaries, the FAR is fed by conscription for men, with a 2-year service obligation.

=== Czechoslovakia ===
The Czechoslovak People's Army, or the ČSLA, was the armed forces of Czechoslovak Socialist Republic. The Czechoslovak Army was formed after Czechoslovakia declared independence from Austria-Hungary in 1918. It was dissolved in 1938, when Germany annexed Czechoslovakia, but was reformed in 1945, as a provisional organization. The was formed after the Communist Party of Czechoslovakia took over in 1948, and was largely funded by the Soviet Union; in 1951, the latter gave almost 44 million rubles in aid to Czechoslovakia so they could purchase military equipment.

The Soviet Union considered the ČSLA satisfactory. Its rejection of the Soviet Union's call for better organization in the Warsaw Pact, the ČSLA commander's attempts to democratize the military, and Alexander Dubček's rise to power in Czechoslovakia and subsequent loosening of censorship resulted in a Soviet invasion in 1968.

Around 500,00 Warsaw Pact soldiers, mostly Soviet, invaded Czechoslovakia in August 1968. The ČSLA failed to defend sufficiently well, and Dubček was deposed.

=== Finland ===
Finland has never been Communist, but the Finnish Civil War was fought between White Finland and the Finnish Socialist Workers' Republic, or the FSWR, or the Reds.

After Finland declared Independence from Russia in 1917, and, directly following that, it was split between the Reds in the south and White Finland in the north. Tensions were always high, and, in 1918, conflict broke out.

The war lasted for 3 months, and resulted in a White victory. There were many executions on both sides, with more Reds being executed then dying in battle. After the war, Finland permanently passed out of the Soviet sphere of influence, siding with Germany during World War 2 and remaining neutral during the Cold War.

=== Germany ===
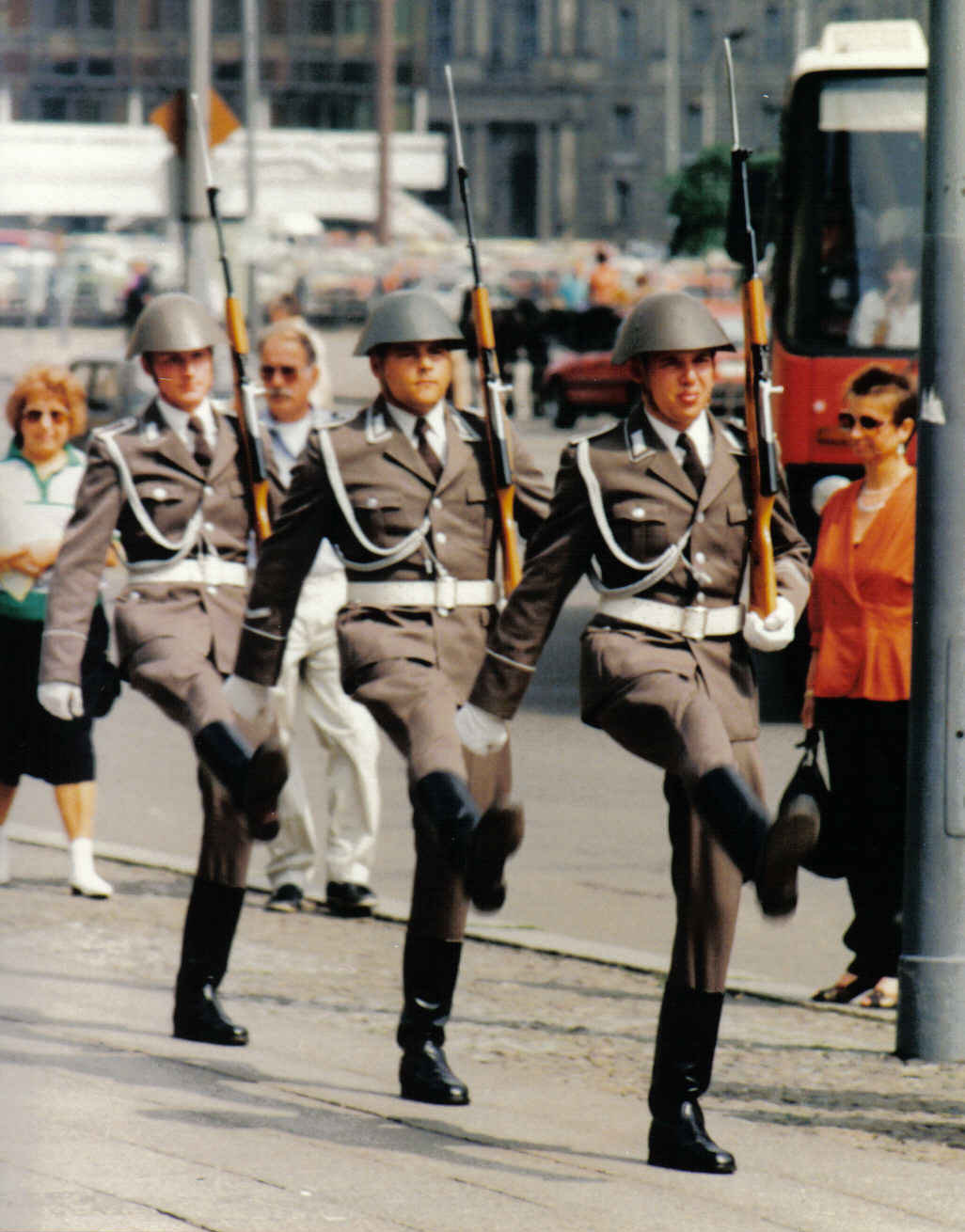
Soldier of the Guard Regiment Freidrich Engels, of the National People's Army

The armed forces of the German Democratic Republic was the National People's Army, or the NVA. It was established on January 18 1956, and the first unit was sworn in on April 30. It originally consisted of Communist veterans of the Spanish Civil War and former Wermacht members, with the latter taking up the majority of the upper command positions. However, by the early 1960s, most of the World War 2 veterans had retired.

The NVA never participated in full-scale conflict, but acted in logistics and support roles in many conflicts. It cancelled military aid and only providing logistics support with the Warsaw Pact Invasion of Czechoslovakia, and providing medical support in the Soviet-Afghan War.

While it never participated in any active armed conflict, the NVA came into combat readiness on numerous occasions. The construction and guarding of the Berlin Wall, for example, was an NVA project, and the Cuban Missile Crisis and the 1989 protests in the DDR were participated in by the NVA.

The NVA was originally volunteer-based, but from 1962 to the end of its existence in 1989 was fed through conscription.
