= List of wars involving the Republic of China =

This is a list of wars involving the Republic of China.

== Wars involving the Republic of China ==
ROC military victory
ROC military defeat
Indecisive or unclear outcome
Ongoing conflict

| War | Republic of China and allies | Opponents | Result |
|---|---|---|---|
| Xinhai Revolution (1911–1912) | Revolutionaries Tongmenghui Provincial governments | Monarchists (Qing dynasty) Imperial Armed Forces Beiyang Army Separatists Bogd Khanate Tibet Tuva | Revolutionary victory: Abdication of the Xuantong Emperor Puyi; Fall of the Qing dynasty; End of Imperial China; Establishment of the Republic of China; Destabilization of China; De facto independence of Outer Mongolia and Tibet (until 1951) |
| National Protection War (1915–1916) | (Republic of China (1912–1949)) Republic of China: Yunnan clique; Guizhou clique; Old Guangxi clique | Empire of China | Republican victory: Abdication of Yuan Shikai; Fall of the Empire of China; Start of the Warlord Era |
| Manchu Restoration (1917) | (Republic of China (1912–1949)) Republic of China: (Republic of China (1912–1949)) Fengtian clique; (Republic of China (1912–1949)) Anhui clique; (Republic of China (1912–1949)) Zhili clique | Restored Qing Imperial Government: Dingwu Army; Royalist Party (limited involvement) | Republic of China victory: General Zhang Xun's army seized Beijing; Briefly reinstallation of the last emperor of the Qing dynasty, Puyi, to the throne; Restoration quickly reversed by Republican troops |
| World War I (1917–1918) | Allied Powers: France; United Kingdom; and Empire: Australia; Canada; Ceylon; Egypt; Newfoundland; New Zealand; India; South Africa; Russia (Note: The Russian Empire during 1914–1917, the Russian Republic during 1917. The Bolshevik government signed a separate peace with the Central Powers shortly after their armed seizure of power, resulting in a Central Powers victory on the Eastern Front of the war, and the Russian Soviet Federative Socialist Republic's defeat. However, this peace treaty was nullified by an Allied Powers victory on the Western Front, and the end of the war.); Italy (from 1915); United States (from 1917); Japan; China; and others ... | Central Powers: Germany; Austria-Hungary; Ottoman Empire; Bulgaria (from 1915); and others ... | Allied Powers victory: Partition of the Ottoman Empire, dissolution of Austria-Hungary, transfer of German colonies and territories to other countries; Formation of new countries in Europe and the Middle East, such as Poland, Yugoslavia, Weimar Germany, Soviet Russia and Soviet Union, Lithuania, Estonia, Latvia, Austria, Hungary, Czechoslovakia, Turkey, Hejaz, and Yemen; M |
| Occupation of Mongolia (1919–1921) | China | Bogd Khanate of Mongolia; Buryat-Mongolia; White Movement | Withdrawal: Mongolia occupied by China until 1921 when the Mongolian Revolution of 1921 occurred |
| Northern Expedition (1926–1928) | (Republic of China (1912–1949)) Beiyang government: National Pacification Army; Fengtian clique; Zhili clique; Japan | (Republic of China (1912–1949)) Nationalist government: United Front (until April 1927); National Revolutionary Army; Kuomintang; Chinese Communist Party (until 1927); Allied warlord armies (Guominjun, Guangxi, Shanxi army, others); Soviet Union; Communist International | NRA victory: Nationalist government rules over the entirety of China; Overthrow of the Beiyang government; End of the Warlord Era; Nanjing–Wuhan split; Beginning of the Chinese Civil War |
| Chinese Civil War (first phase) (1927–1936) | (Republic of China (1912–1949)) Republic of China: Kuomintang; Republic of China Armed Forces | Chinese Soviet Republic (from 1931) Jiangxi Soviet (1931–1934): Chinese Communist Party; Chinese Red Army | Ceasefire: Fighting suspended due to the war with Japan and World War II; KMT and CCP form the Second United Front in 1937 |
| Sino-Soviet Conflict (1929) | Republic of China; White movement of Russia | Soviet Union | Soviet victory: Provisions of 1924 agreement upheld; Khabarovsk Protocol signed; The Soviet/Russian military occupation over entire Bolshoy Ussuriysky Island until 2004 |
| Sino-Tibetan War (1930–1932) | China | Tibet | Chinese victory: Tibetan invasion repulsed; Eastern Xikang falls under Chinese control |
| Japanese Invasion of Manchuria (1931–1932) | China | Japan; Manchukuo (from 1932); Chinese collaborators | Japanese victory: Tanggu Truce; Manchuria seized by the Kwantung Army; Establishment of Manchukuo as a Japanese puppet state |
| Soviet Invasion of Xinjiang (1934) | China | Soviet Union; Xinjiang clique; White Russian forces; Torgut Mongols | Ceasefire: Xinjiang divided in two; Sheng Shicai fails to take over all of Xinjiang |
| Islamic Rebellion in Xinjiang (1937) | Republic of China Muslim Turkic rebels | Xinjiang clique Soviet Union | Provincial government victory: Sheng Shicai's pro-Soviet regime establishes its rule over the whole territory of Xinjiang province. |
| Second Sino-Japanese War (1937–1945) | China | Japan | Victory: Merged into World War II; Chinese victory as part of the Allied victory in the Pacific War; Surrender of all Japanese forces in mainland China (excluding Manchuria), Formosa and French Indochina north of 16° north to China; China becomes a permanent member of the United Nations Security Council; Resumption of the Chinese Civil War |
| World War II (1939–1945) | United States; Soviet Union; United Kingdom; China; France; Poland; Canada; Australia; New Zealand; India; South Africa; Yugoslavia; Greece; Denmark; Norway; Netherlands; Belgium; Luxembourg; Czechoslovakia; Brazil; Mexico (Commonwealth of the Philippines) Philippines; British Malaya | Germany; Japan; Italy; Hungary; Romania; Bulgaria; Slovakia; Croatia; Finland; Thailand; Manchukuo; Mengjiang | Victory: Collapse of the Third Reich; Fall of Japanese and Italian Empires; Creation of the United Nations; Emergence of the United States and the Soviet Union as superpowers; Beginning of the Cold War |
| Chinese Civil War (second phase) (1945–1949) | (Republic of China (1912–1949)) Republic of China: Kuomintang; Republic of China Armed Forces | Yan'an Soviet People's Republic of China (1949): Chinese Communist Party; People's Liberation Army | Communist victory: Communist control of mainland China; Proclamation of the People's Republic of China; Retreat of the government of the Republic of China to Taiwan |

== See also ==
- List of Chinese wars and battles
- List of wars involving the People's Republic of China
- List of wars involving Taiwan
