= Outline of the military history of the People's Republic of China =

The following is a topical outline of English Wikipedia articles about the military history of the People's Republic of China. (Note: See Outline of the Chinese Civil War for a full outline of the military history of the event.) It includes the military events, individuals, and topics involving the People's Republic of China from the Chinese Civil War to the present. The events are outlined chronologically with topical subsections.

== Overview articles ==
History

- History of the People's Republic of China

- History of China (1949–1976)
- History of China (1976–1989)
- History of China (1989–2002)
- History of China (2002–2012)
- History of China (2012–present)

Military branches and services

- People's Liberation Army
- People's Liberation Army Ground Force
- People's Liberation Army Navy
- People's Liberation Army Air Force
- People's Liberation Army Rocket Force
- People's Armed Police
- China Coast Guard
- Militia (China)
- Maritime Militia

== Major conflicts ==
- Chinese Civil War was fought between the Kuomintang-led government of the Republic of China and the forces of the Chinese Communist Party (CCP), with armed conflict continuing intermittently from 1 August 1927 until 7 December 1949, resulting in a CCP victory and control of mainland China in the Chinese Communist Revolution.

- Main article: Outline of the Chinese Civil War

- Korean War was fought between North Korea and South Korea from 1950 to 1953. It began on 25 June 1950 when North Korea invaded South Korea and ceased after an armistice on 27 July 1953. The north was supported by China and the Soviet Union while the south was supported by United Nations (UN) forces led by the United States.
- Vietnam War was a conflict in Vietnam, Laos, and Cambodia from 1 November 1955 to the fall of Saigon on 30 April 1975. It was the second of the Indochina Wars and was a major conflict of the Cold War. While the war was officially fought between North Vietnam and South Vietnam, the north was supported by the Soviet Union, China, and other communist states, while the south was supported by the United States and other anti-communist allies. The conflict spilled over into neighboring states, exacerbating the Laotian Civil War and the Cambodian Civil War.

== Short conflicts and events ==
- Battle of Chamdo (or Qamdo; Chinese: 昌都战役) (Note: The exiled Tibetan government in India calls The battle "The invasion of Tibet by the People's Liberation Army of China".) was a military campaign by the People's Republic of China from 6 to 24 October 1950 to take the Chamdo Region from a de facto independent Tibetan state. The campaign resulted in the capture of Chamdo and the annexation of Tibet by the People's Republic of China.
- First Taiwan Strait Crisis (also known as the Formosa Crisis, the 1954–1955 Taiwan Strait Crisis, the Offshore Islands Crisis, the Quemoy-Matsu Crisis, and the 1955 Taiwan Strait Crisis) was a brief armed conflict between the People's Republic of China and the Republic of China (ROC) in Taiwan. The conflict focused on several groups of islands in the Taiwan Strait that were held by the ROC but were located only a few miles from mainland China.
- Second Taiwan Strait Crisis (also called the 1958 Taiwan Strait Crisis), was a conflict between the People's Republic of China and the Republic of China (ROC). During the conflict, the PRC shelled the islands of Kinmen (Quemoy) and the Matsu Islands along the east coast of mainland China (in the Taiwan Strait) in an attempt to take control of Taiwan from the Chinese Nationalist Party, also known as the Kuomintang (KMT), and to probe the extent of the United States' defense of Taiwan's territory. A naval battle also took place around Dongding Island when the ROC Navy repelled an attempted amphibious landing by the PRC Navy.
- 1960–61 campaign at the China–Burma border (simplified Chinese: 中缅边境作战; traditional Chinese: 中緬邊境作戰) was a series of battles fought along the China–Burma border after the Chinese Civil War, with the People's Republic of China (PRC) and the Union of Burma on one side and the nationalist forces of the Republic of China (ROC) on the other. The government of the PRC refers to the campaign as the China–Burma border demarcation and security operation (simplified Chinese: 中缅边境勘界警卫作战; traditional Chinese: 中緬邊境勘界警衛作戰).
- Sino-Indian War, also known as the China–India War or the Indo–China War, was an armed conflict between China and India that took place from October to November 1962. It was a military escalation of the Sino–Indian border dispute. Fighting occurred along India's border with China, in India's North-East Frontier Agency east of Bhutan, and in Aksai Chin west of Nepal.
- Sino-Soviet border conflict was a seven-month undeclared military conflict between the Soviet Union and China in 1969, following the Sino-Soviet split. The most serious border clash, which brought the world's two largest communist states to the brink of war, occurred near Damansky (Zhenbao) Island on the Ussuri (Wusuli) River in Manchuria. Clashes also took place in Xinjiang.
- Battle of the Paracel Islands (Chinese: 西沙海战, Pinyin: Xisha Haizhan；Vietnamese: Hải chiến Hoàng Sa) was a military engagement between the naval forces of China and South Vietnam in the Paracel Islands on January 19, 1974. The battle was an attempt by the South Vietnamese navy to expel the Chinese navy from the vicinity. The confrontation took place towards the end of the Vietnam War.
- Sino-Vietnamese War, also known by other names), was a brief conflict that occurred in early 1979 between China and Vietnam. China launched an offensive in response to Vietnam's invasion and occupation of Cambodia in 1978, which ended the rule of the Chinese-backed Khmer Rouge. The conflict lasted for about a month, with China withdrawing its troops in March 1979.
- Sino-Vietnamese conflicts (1979–1991) were a series of border and naval clashes between the People's Republic of China and the Socialist Republic of Vietnam following the Sino-Vietnamese War in 1979. These clashes lasted from the end of the Sino-Vietnamese War until the normalization of ties in 1991.
- Johnson South Reef skirmish took place on 14 March 1988 between military forces of the People's Republic of China and Vietnam, on the Johnson South Reef in the Union Banks region of the Spratly Islands, in the South China Sea.
- Third Taiwan Strait Crisis (also called the 1995–1996 Taiwan Strait Crisis or the 1996 Taiwan Strait Crisis), was the effect of a series of missile tests conducted by the People's Republic of China in the waters surrounding Taiwan, including the Taiwan Strait from 21 July 1995 to 23 March 1996. The first set of missiles fired in mid-to-late 1995 were allegedly intended to send a strong signal to the Republic of China government under President Lee Teng-hui, who had been seen as "moving its foreign policy away from the One-China policy", as claimed by PRC. The second set of missiles were fired in early 1996, allegedly intending to intimidate the Taiwanese electorate in the run-up to the 1996 presidential election.
- Scarborough Shoal standoff is a dispute between the Philippines and the People's Republic of China over the Scarborough Shoal. Tensions began on April 8, 2012, after the attempted apprehension by the Philippine Navy of eight mainland Chinese fishing vessels near the shoal.
- 2020–2021 China–India skirmishes began on 5 May 2020, when Chinese and Indian troops engaged in aggressive melee, face-offs, and skirmishes at locations along the Sino-Indian border, including near the disputed Pangong Lake in Ladakh and the Tibet Autonomous Region, and near the border between Sikkim and the Tibet Autonomous Region. Additional clashes also took place at locations in eastern Ladakh along the Line of Actual Control (LAC).

== Major individuals and groups ==
=== Political ===
Below are a lists of primarily political individuals and groups serving the People's Republic of China that spanned multiple conflicts and events. See the events for specific individuals and units involved in one particular conflict.

Individuals (Note: Years represent the period the individual was influential and in a position of power in the People's Republic of China.)

- Mao Zedong (1949–1976)
- Lin Biao (1949–1971)
- Chen Yi (marshal) (1949–1972)
- Hua Guofeng (1976–1978)
- Deng Xiaoping (1978–1989)
- Jiang Zemin (1989–2002)
- Hu Jintao (2002–2012)
- Xi Jinping (2012 to present)

Groups

- Chinese Communist Party
- Chinese Red Army

=== Military ===
Below are a lists of primarily military individuals and units serving the People's Republic of China that spanned multiple conflicts and events. See the events for specific individuals and units involved in one particular conflict.

Individuals

- Zhang Guotao
- Peng Dehuai
- Zhu De
- He Long
- Liu Bocheng
- Nie Rongzhen

==== Theater Commands ====
- Theater Commands (China)
  - Northern Theater Command
  - Southern Theater Command
  - Western Theater Command
  - Eastern Theater Command
  - Central Theater Command

Formations and units

- Hong Kong Garrison

== Reform and modernization ==
- Modernization of the People's Liberation Army
- 2015 People's Republic of China Military Reform

== Geography and locations ==
- Lazikou Pass
- Site of Joining Forces in Wenjiashi of Autumn Harvest Uprising
- Chinese People's Liberation Army Forces Hong Kong Building

== Documents, speeches, and proclamation ==
- The Party commands the gun, and the gun must never be allowed to command the Party
- 1929 Gutian Congress
- August 1 Declaration
- Proclamation of the People's Republic of China

== Military history related lists ==
Below includes lists of military history topics related to the People's Republic of China.

- List of active People's Liberation Army aircraft
- List of active People's Liberation Army Navy ships
- List of wars involving the People's Republic of China

== See also ==
- List of Chinese wars and battles
- List of wars involving the Republic of China
- List of wars involving Taiwan
- Outline of the Chinese Civil War
- Military history of China
