= North China Military Exercise =

Military exercise in September 1981

The North China Military Exercise (simplified Chinese: 华北大演习; traditional Chinese: 華北大演習) was a massive military exercise carried out by the People's Liberation Army (PLA) in North China from September 14 to 18, 1981. With the participation of more 114,000 soldiers, it was the largest military exercise conducted by the PLA since the founding of the People's Republic of China in 1949. Deng Xiaoping, then paramount leader of China and Chairman of the Central Military Commission, attended and observed the entire exercise along with other senior officials.

== History ==
From October 1980 to March 1981, Deng Xiaoping determined that a military exercise was necessary for the People's Liberation Army (PLA), and chose the largest version in terms of exercise scale from the three proposed plans. The details of arrangement and organization were left to the Beijing Military Region. On March 12, 1981, a central committee for the exercise was established, with Yang Dezhi, then PLA Chief-of-Staff, being the director of the committee; Yang Yong, Zhang Zhen and Qin Jiwei were appointed the vice directors.

In September 1981, Deng Xiaoping attended and observed the military exercise along with other senior officials including Hu Yaobang, Zhao Ziyang and Li Xiannian. A total of over 32,000 military and governmental officials observed the exercise.

Specifically, 114,000 PLA soldiers participated in the exercise, in addition to 1,327 tanks and armored vehicles, 1,541 cannons, 475 airplanes as well as 10,606 army trucks. The exercised was funded by the State Council of the People's Republic of China, and accounted for 1/16 of China's military expenditures of that year. On September 19, 1981, a large-scale military parade took place after the exercise at the airport of Zhangjiakou, where Deng Xiaoping delivered a closing speech.

== See also ==
- Exercise Zapad-81
- Beijing Military Region
- Reform and Opening-up
- Modernization of the People's Liberation Army
- History of the People's Liberation Army
