= First United Front =

1924–27 alliance between the Chinese Communist Party and the Kuomintang

- 聯俄容共
- Leaders: Sun Yat-sen (1923–1925); Chiang Kai-shek (1926–1927)
- Dates active: January 26, 1923 – April 12, 1927
- Merger of: Chinese Nationalist Party; Chinese Communist Party
- Country: China
- Allegiance: (Republic of China (1912–1949)) Nationalist government
- Headquarters: Guangzhou
- Anthem: "National Revolutionary Anthem"

The First United Front, (Note: traditional Chinese: 第一次國共合作; simplified Chinese: 第一次国共合作; pinyin: dì yī cì guógòng hézuò; lit. 'First Nationalist-Communist Cooperation') also known as the KMT–CCP Alliance, (Note: simplified Chinese: 联俄容共; traditional Chinese: 聯俄容共; pinyin: Lián É Róng Gòng; Jyutping: Lyun4 Ngo4 Jung4 Gung6; lit. 'Ally with Russia and incorporate the Communists'; alternatively simplified Chinese: 联俄联共; traditional Chinese: 聯俄聯共; pinyin: Lián É Lián Gòng; Jyutping: Lyun4 Ngo4 Lyun4 Gung6) of the Kuomintang (KMT) and the Chinese Communist Party (CCP), was an alliance formed in 1923 and dissolved in 1927 to end warlordism in China. Together they formed the National Revolutionary Army and set out in 1926 on the Northern Expedition.

In its three years of alliance, both the CCP and the KMT gained much strength while banding together against their mutual enemy of Western imperialism and warlordism. The KMT established its organization throughout many provinces and largely eradicated the northern threat of the Beiyang Army, notably its generals Sun Chuanfang and Wu Peifu, overall greatly extending its influence. The CCP joined the KMT as individuals, making use of KMT's superiority in numbers to help spread communism and establishing their foundation of support for their later struggle with the KMT in the Chinese Civil War.

However, tensions remained between the two groups as both parties wanted to advance their opposing ideologies. In 1927, KMT leader Chiang Kai-shek purged the Communists from the Front while the Northern Expedition was still half-complete. This initiated a civil war between the two parties that lasted until the Second United Front was formed in 1936 to prepare for the coming Second Sino-Japanese War.

== Background ==
=== Impact of the Russian Revolution ===
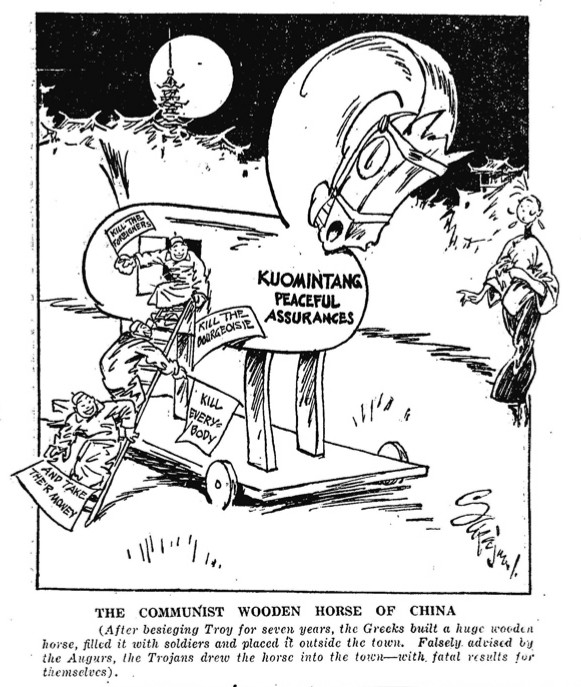
Cartoon of North China Herald depicting Kuomintang as the Trojan Horse of Communists

Although its significance was not fully recognized at first by Chinese observers, the October Revolution would eventually have a profound effect on China. Sun Yat-sen and the Kuomintang's reaction to the news was immediately positive. Sun Yat-sen called Vladimir Lenin a "great man", and indicated he wished to follow the same path that Lenin had. However, this was unusual. It took other Chinese radicals such as Chen Duxiu and Li Dazhao until after the end of World War I for them to appreciate the Bolsheviks' radical departure from the February Revolution. By early 1920, however, they had become convinced of the efficacy of this new revolutionary and political model and were moving towards founding the CCP.

Sun Yat-sen's 1924 inscription: "Future revolutionary efforts cannot succeed unless Russia is taken as the model." (今後之革命非以俄為師斷無成就)

The foreign policy of the new Soviet Union towards China was likewise extremely significant. According to orthodox Marxist theory, countries like China lacked the material conditions (such as a large proletariat) to successfully transition to socialism. However, Lenin argued in Imperialism, the Highest Stage of Capitalism, that capitalism in the early twentieth century had become dependent on imperialist exploitation of the third world. Anti-imperialist movements had the potential of destabilizing the worldwide capitalist system and in that way could hasten the revolution where material conditions were right. Thus, the early Soviet position on China was opposed to socialist revolution—in the Sun-Joffe Manifesto, they formally agreed that China was not ready for "the Soviet system". But they sought to encourage an anti-imperialist movement that included both "bourgeois nationalists" and the working class. The Sun-Joffe Manifesto began a period of extensive aid to Sun Yat-sen and his movement. Soviet advisors helped Sun reorganize the Kuomintang along Leninist lines, making the party significantly more effective. They founded the Whampoa military academy as well as a civil university to educate KMT cadres.

== The resurrection of Kuomintang ==
During the time of warlords, Sun Yat-sen kept the idea of a united Chinese republic alive. His goal was to establish a rival government in Guangzhou, southern China, and go from there to fight against the warlords in the North and their Beiyang government. Upon his return from exile in 1917, Sun revived his banned nationalist party, the Kuomintang, but this time he gave it the new name, the Kuomintang of China. His plan was that after defeating the warlords the party would guide China until the country would be ready to move to democracy.

This rival government led by Sun, however, was at a disadvantage against the warlords from a military point of view. Despite his requests for aid from the West, badly needed financial and arms support never arrived in the country. In 1923, the Kuomintang allied itself with the Soviet Union, including allowing Russian management of the Chinese Eastern Railway and Russian occupation of some parts of Mongolia. In exchange, Sun eventually received help from the Russian Bolsheviks in the form of large amounts of money and firearms. Material aid from Russia was good enough for Sun, who had previously shown flexibility when the question was about the promotion of the republic. He had neither sympathy towards Marxism nor did he see communism as a solution to China's problems. In Sun's view, China was not of the rich and the poor; rather, it was the country of the poor and the poorer. The guidelines of the Kuomintang were based on Sun's "Three Principles of the People": nationalism, democracy and the people's livelihood (socialism).

The Kuomintang gradually became a powerful and disciplined party under Russian guidance. The decisive factor was the Bolshevik's assistance to the Kuomintang in the formation of its own army, the National Revolutionary Army. In order to train the army the Whampoa Military Academy was established near Guangzhou. As its director, Sun appointed his loyal supporter Chiang Kai-shek. Financially the Whampoa Military Academy operated with the support of the Soviet Union. The quality of education was guaranteed by regularly visiting Russian officers. Many of the leaders of both the Kuomintang and the CCP graduated from the academy—the chief commander of the People's Liberation Army, Lin Biao, graduated from Whampoa, as did Zhou Enlai, who later became premier of Communist China.

After Sun's death in March 1925, the issue of tolerating communism within the KMT grew steadily more divisive amongst party members.

== Fall ==
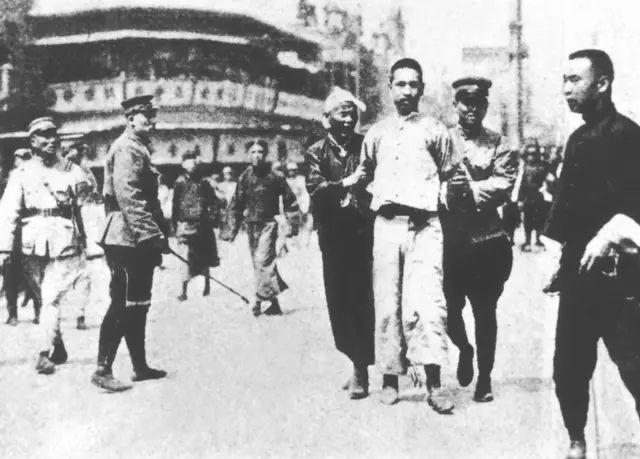
Communists being arrested and killed by military police in Shanghai

The First United Front was formed with the stated aim to help defeat the warlord threat (through the Northern Expedition of 1926–28), but both parties actually had ulterior motives with this alliance. The CCP formed it mainly so it could spread communism within the KMT and its members, while Chiang's aim was to control the CCP from the inside. Having said that, he was also the main reason the relationship fell apart, due to his desire to control the CCP, ultimately leading to the disintegration of the First United Front. After purging the Communists and Soviet advisors from Whampoa and his Nationalist army during the 1926 "Canton Coup", and following a series of armed workers strikes in 1926, and organized also by Zhou Enlai in 1927, Chiang went on to kill a large number of Communist forces in mid-1927, an event known as the Shanghai massacre and which began the White Terror in China. The massacre occurred about halfway through the Northern Expedition, ultimately ruining the First United Front and resulting in the Chinese Civil War. The Civil War was later postponed when the two sides formed the Second United Front to combat the Japanese in the Second Sino-Japanese War.

== See also ==
- Outline of the Chinese Civil War
- Timeline of the Chinese Civil War
- United front (China)
- United front in Taiwan
- United front
- United Front Work Department

== Bibliography ==
- Zarrow, Peter (2005). China in War and Revolution 1895–1949. New York: Routledge. doi:10.4324/9780203015629. ISBN 978-1-134-21977-3.
- Pantsov, Alexander (2000). The Bolsheviks and the Chinese Revolution, 1919–1927. Honolulu: University of Hawai'i Press. doi:10.4324/9781315027968. hdl:10125/23045. ISBN 978-1-315-02796-8.
- Feigon, Lee (1983). Chen Duxiu: Founder of the Chinese Communist Party. Princeton: Princeton University Press. doi:10.1515/9781400858057. ISBN 978-1-4008-5805-7. JSTOR j.ctt7ztnm3.
