= Manifesto of the Chinese People's Liberation Army =

1947 Chinese Communist Party document

- Simplified Chinese: 中国人民解放军宣言
- Traditional Chinese: 中國人民解放軍宣言
- Hanyu Pinyin: Zhōngguó Rénmín Jiěfàngjūn Xuānyán
Transcriptions
Standard Mandarin
- Hanyu Pinyin: Zhōngguó Rénmín Jiěfàngjūn Xuānyán

Alternative name
- Simplified Chinese: 双十宣言
- Traditional Chinese: 雙十宣言
- Hanyu Pinyin: Shuāngshí Xuānyán
Transcriptions
Standard Mandarin
- Hanyu Pinyin: Shuāngshí Xuānyán

The Manifesto of the Chinese People's Liberation Army, also known as the October 10th Manifesto, is a political declaration published by the Chinese Communist Party (CCP) in the People's Daily in the Shanxi-Hebei-Shandong-Henan revolutionary base area on October 10, 1947. It declared the establishment of the People's Liberation Army (PLA). It was drafted by CCP Chairman Mao Zedong, signed by Commander-in-Chief Zhu De and Deputy Commander-in-Chief Peng Dehuai, and later included in the Selected Works of Mao Zedong.

== Content ==
The declaration analyzed the domestic political situation, put forward the slogan "overthrow Chiang Kai-shek and liberate all of China", and announced the eight basic policies of the PLA. Also published on the same day in the People's Daily of the Shanxi-Hebei-Shandong-Henan revolutionary base area were the "Slogans of the Chinese People's Liberation Army" (a total of 67 items) and the "Instructions of the Headquarters of the Chinese People's Liberation Army on the Re-issuance of the Three Major Disciplines and Eight Points for Attention".
