= List of wars involving Taiwan =

This is a list of wars involving Taiwan.

Taiwan has been ruled by various regimes throughout its history.

== Wars involving Taiwan ==
Military victory
Defeat
Indecisive or unclear outcome
Ongoing conflict

War	Combatant 1	Combatant 2	Result
Japanese colonial rule (1895–1945)
Japanese invasion of Taiwan (1895)	Republic of Formosa: Local militias	Empire of Japan	Japanese victory: Collapse of the Republic of Formosa 5-month insurgency; Annexation of Taiwan by Japan
Beipu uprising (1907)	Hakka; Saisiyat	Japan	Japanese victory
Tapani incident (1915)	Da Ming Cibeiguo; Han Taiwanese; Taiwanese aborigines	Empire of Japan	Japanese victory
Musha Incident (1930)	Tkdaya	Empire of Japan; Toda; Truku (Taroko)	Japanese victory
Second Sino-Japanese War (1937–1945)	China Kuomintang Chinese Communist Party	Japan Manchukuo Mengjiang Wang Jingwei regime	Chinese victory: China recovers territories lost to Japan since the Treaty of Shimonoseki
Republic of China (1945–present)
Chinese Civil War (second phase) (1945–1949)	1945–1949: (Republic of China (1912–1949)) Republic of China: Kuomintang; Republic of China Armed Forces	1945–1949: Yan'an Soviet; People's Republic of China (1949): Chinese Communist Party; People's Liberation Army	Communist victory: Communist control of mainland China; Proclamation of the People's Republic of China; Retreat of the government of the Republic of China to Taiwan
First Taiwan Strait Crisis (1954–1955)	Taiwan; United States	People's Republic of China	Ceasefire; major escalation avoided: The PRC takes control of the Yijiangshan and Dachen Islands; The ROC and US navies evacuate military personnel and civilians from the Dachen Islands; Formosa Resolution of 1955 and Sino-American Mutual Defense Treaty between the ROC and US
China–Burma border campaign (1960–1961)	PRC; Burma	ROC	Defeat: Kuomintang expelled from Burma
Second Taiwan Strait Crisis (1958)	Taiwan; United States	People's Republic of China	Ceasefire: Successful military defence of Kinmen by the ROC; Status quo ante bellum
Communist insurgency in Thailand (1965–1983)	Thailand: Royal Thai Armed Forces; Royal Thai Police; Border Patrol Police; Volunteer Defense Corps; Thahan Phran; Internal Security Operations Command; Village Scouts; Nawaphon; Red Gaurs; Kingdom of Laos (until 1975); ROC 93rd Division; Malaysia; Supported by: United States; Shan United Revolutionary Army; Karen National Union	Communist Party of Thailand: People's Liberation Army of Thailand; Federation of Farmers and Workers; National Student Center of Thailand; Ethnic groups, especially the Hmong; Pathet Lao; Malayan Communist Party; Communist Party of Burma; Supported by: Khmer Rouge (until 1978); People's Republic of Kampuchea (since 1979); People's Republic of China (until 1980); North Vietnam	Thai government victory: Amnesty declared on 23 April 1980 by the Thai government; Order 66/2523 signed by Prime Minister Prem Tinsulanonda; Communist insurgency declines and ends in 1983
Third Taiwan Strait Crisis (1995–1996)	Republic of China; United States (naval support)	People's Republic of China	Inconclusive: Ceasefire

- Fourth Taiwan Strait Crisis (2022-present)

== See also ==
- List of wars involving the Republic of China
