= List of wars involving the People's Republic of China =

This is a list of wars involving the People's Republic of China (PRC). The PRC last fought a war in 1979 (the Sino-Vietnamese War) and has fought only in relatively minor engagements since.

== Wars involving the People's Republic of China ==
PRC military victory
Indecisive or unclear outcome (Note: A treaty or peace with an indecisive, inconclusive result, or resulting in status quo ante bellum.)
Ongoing Conflict / Civil War or internal conflict
PRC military defeat

No.	War	People's Republic of China and allies	Opponents	Result
1	Chinese Civil War (1927–1949)	1927–1936 Chinese Soviet Republic (from 1931) Jiangxi Soviet (1931–1934): Chinese Communist Party; Chinese Red Army; 1945–1949 Yan'an Soviet People's Republic of China (1949): Chinese Communist Party; People's Liberation Army	1927–1936 (Republic of China (1912–1949)) Republic of China: Kuomintang; National Revolutionary Army; 1945–1949 (Republic of China (1912–1949)) Republic of China: Kuomintang; Republic of China Armed Forces	Victory: Communist control of mainland China; Proclamation of the People's Republic of China; Retreat of the government of the Republic of China to Taiwan
2	Battle of Chamdo (1950)	People's Republic of China	Tibet	Victory: People's Republic of China annexes Tibet
3	Korean War (1950–1953)	North Korea; China; Soviet Union	South Korea; United States; United Kingdom; Canada; Turkey; Australia; Philippines; New Zealand; Thailand; Ethiopia; Greece; France; Colombia; Belgium; South Africa; Netherlands; Luxembourg	Ceasefire: North Korean invasion of South Korea repelled; UN military intervention and invasion of North Korea repelled; Chinese-North Korean invasion of South Korea repelled; DMZ established, little territorial change at the 38th parallel border, essentially uti possidetis
4	First Taiwan Strait Crisis (1954–1955)	PRC	ROC; United States	Ceasefire: PRC withdrawal, status quo ante bellum.
5	Laotian Civil War (1959–1975)	Pathet Lao; North Vietnam; Neutralists (1960–1962; 1963–1969); China; Soviet Union	Kingdom of Laos; Neutralists (1962–1966); United States; South Vietnam; Thailand; Republic of China	Victory: Establishment of the Lao People's Democratic Republic; End of the Kingdom of Laos; Insurgency by anti-communists
6	China–Burma border campaign (1960–1961)	PRC; Burma	ROC	Victory: Kuomintang expelled from Burma
7	Sino-Indian War (1962)	China	India	Victory: Status quo ante bellum
8	Communist insurgency in Thailand (1965–1976)	Communist Party of Thailand; People's Liberation Army of Thailand; Federation of Farmers and Workers; National Student Center of Thailand; Minority ethnic groups, especially the Hmong; Pathet Lao (until 1975); Malayan Communist Party; Communist Party of Burma Khmer Rouge; People's Republic of China (until 1976); North Vietnam (until 1976)	Thailand; Royal Thai Armed Forces; Thahan Phran; Royal Thai Police; Border Patrol Police; Volunteer Defense Corps; Internal Security Operations Command; Thai Ultranationalist Organization; Village Scouts; Nawaphon; Red Gaurs; Kingdom of Laos (until 1975); ROC 93rd Division; Malaysia; Shan United Revolutionary Army; Karen National Union: United States; CIA; United States Air Force in Thailand; United States Air Force Security Forces	Defeat: Thai government victory
9	Nathu La and Cho La clashes (1967)	China	India	Defeat: PRC withdrawal from Nathu La and Cho La
10	Sino-Soviet Border Conflict (1969)	China	Soviet Union	Defeat: Status quo ante bellum
11	Vietnam War (1965–1969)	North Vietnam (Provisional Revolutionary Government of the Republic of South Vietnam) Viet Cong (Laos) Pathet Lao (Cambodia) Khmer Rouge; China; Soviet Union; North Korea	United States; South Vietnam; South Korea; Australia; New Zealand; Laos; Cambodia; Khmer Republic; Thailand	Withdrawal: Withdrawal of American-led forces from Indochina; Communist governments took power in South Vietnam, Laos and Cambodia; China took over Paracel Islands from South Vietnam; Republic of Vietnam collapsed, the Provisional Revolutionary Government of the Republic of South Vietnam took control of South Vietnam.; South Vietnam was annexed by North Vietnam; Breakdown in Sino-Vietnamese relations leading to the Sino-Vietnamese War
12	Third Indochina War (1978–1991)	China; Democratic Kampuchea (until 1979/82); CGDK (after 1982): PDK; FUNCINPEC; KPNLF; Lao royalists Hmong insurgents FULRO; Thailand Supported by: United States; Malaysia; North Korea; Romania; Somalia National United Front for the Liberation of Vietnam (1980-1987)	Vietnam; Laos; People's Republic of Kampuchea (until 1989); State of Cambodia (from 1989); Supported by: Albania; Bulgaria; Cuba; Czechoslovakia; East Germany; Hungary; India; Poland; Soviet Union; Derg (1978–1987); PDRE (from 1987); South Yemen; Grenada Communist Party of Thailand: Pak Mai Supported by: Malayan Communist Party	1991 Paris Peace Accords: Insurgency in Laos; Removal of the Khmer Rouge from power; End of the Cambodian genocide; Pro-Vietnamese government installed in Cambodia; China withdraws from Vietnam after 27 days of fighting; Communist Party of Thailand abandons armed struggle; Vietnam withdraws from Cambodia in 1989; 1990 Chengdu summit leads to the normalization of relations between China and Vietnam; Restoration of the House of Norodom in Cambodia; Establishment of United Nations Transitional Authority in Cambodia; Vietnam, Laos and Cambodia join ASEAN in the late 1990s.
13	Sino-Vietnamese War (1979)	China	Vietnam	Status quo antebellum, both sides claim victory: Chinese withdrawal from Vietnam; Continued Vietnamese occupation of Cambodia until 1989; Sino-Vietnamese conflicts (1979–1991)

== Other conflicts ==
- Second Taiwan Strait Crisis (1958)
- Battle of the Paracel Islands (1974)
- Johnson South Reef Skirmish (1988)
- Third Taiwan Strait Crisis (1995)
- Scarborough Shoal standoff (2012)
- 2020–2021 China–India skirmishes
- 2022 Yangtse clash
- Fourth Taiwan Strait Crisis (2022 – present)

=== UN peacekeeping and anti-piracy missions ===
- United Nations Mission in Liberia
- United Nations Interim Force in Lebanon
- United Nations–African Union Mission in Darfur
- Mali War - United Nations Multidimensional Integrated Stabilization Mission in Mali
- Anti-piracy measures in Somalia

== See also ==
- List of wars and battles involving China
- Outline of the Chinese Civil War
- Outline of the military history of the People's Republic of China
- Foreign interventions by China
