= USS LST-755 =

LST-542-class landing ship tank

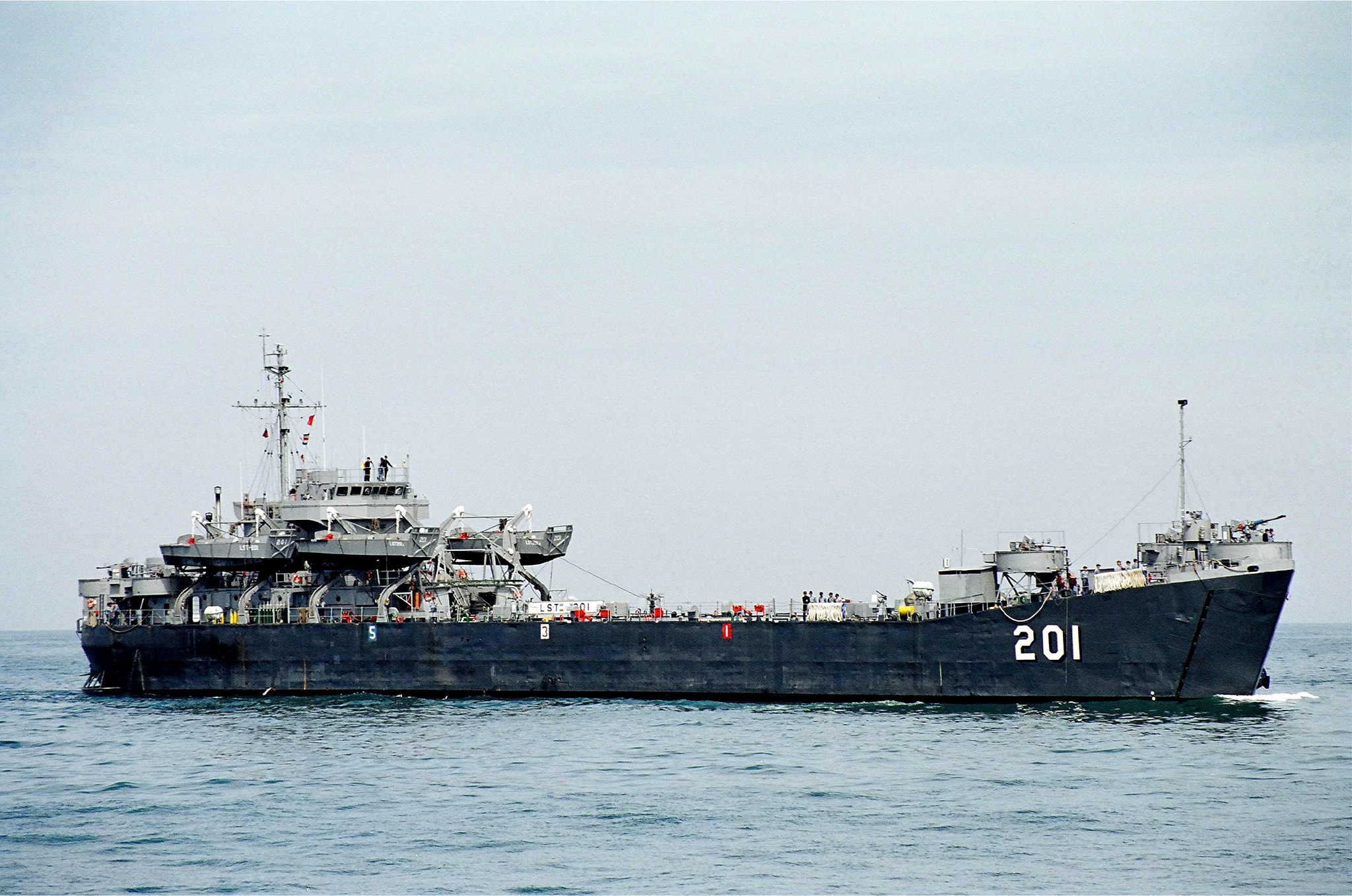
- ROCS Chung Hai

History

United States
- Name: LST-755
- Builder: American Bridge Company, Ambridge
- Laid down: 20 May 1944
- Launched: 11 July 1944
- Sponsored by: Mrs L. W. Day
- Commissioned: 3 August 1944
- Decommissioned: 29 May 1946
- Stricken: 12 March 1948
- Identification: Callsign: NGFX
- Honors and awards: See Awards
- Fate: Transferred to Republic of China, 1948

Taiwan
- Name: Chung Hai; (中海)
- Namesake: China Seas
- Acquired: 29 May 1946
- Commissioned: 29 May 1946
- Decommissioned: 1 February 2010
- Home port: Kaohsiung
- Identification: Callsign: BCFM; Hull number: LST-201
- Status: Awaiting restoration to be a museum ship

General characteristics
- Class & type: LST-542-class tank landing ship
- Displacement: 1,625 long tons (1,651 t) light; 4,080 long tons (4,145 t) full
- Length: 328 ft (100 m)
- Beam: 50 ft (15 m)
- Draft: Unloaded : 2 ft 4 in (0.71 m) forward; 7 ft 6 in (2.29 m) aft; Loaded : 8 ft 2 in (2.49 m) forward; 14 ft 1 in (4.29 m) aft
- Propulsion: 2 × General Motors 12-567 diesel engines, two shafts, twin rudders
- Speed: 12 knots (22 km/h; 14 mph)
- Boats & landing craft carried: 2 × LCVPs
- Troops: 16 officers, 147 enlisted men
- Complement: 7 officers, 104 enlisted men
- Armament: 8 × 40 mm guns; 12 × 20 mm guns

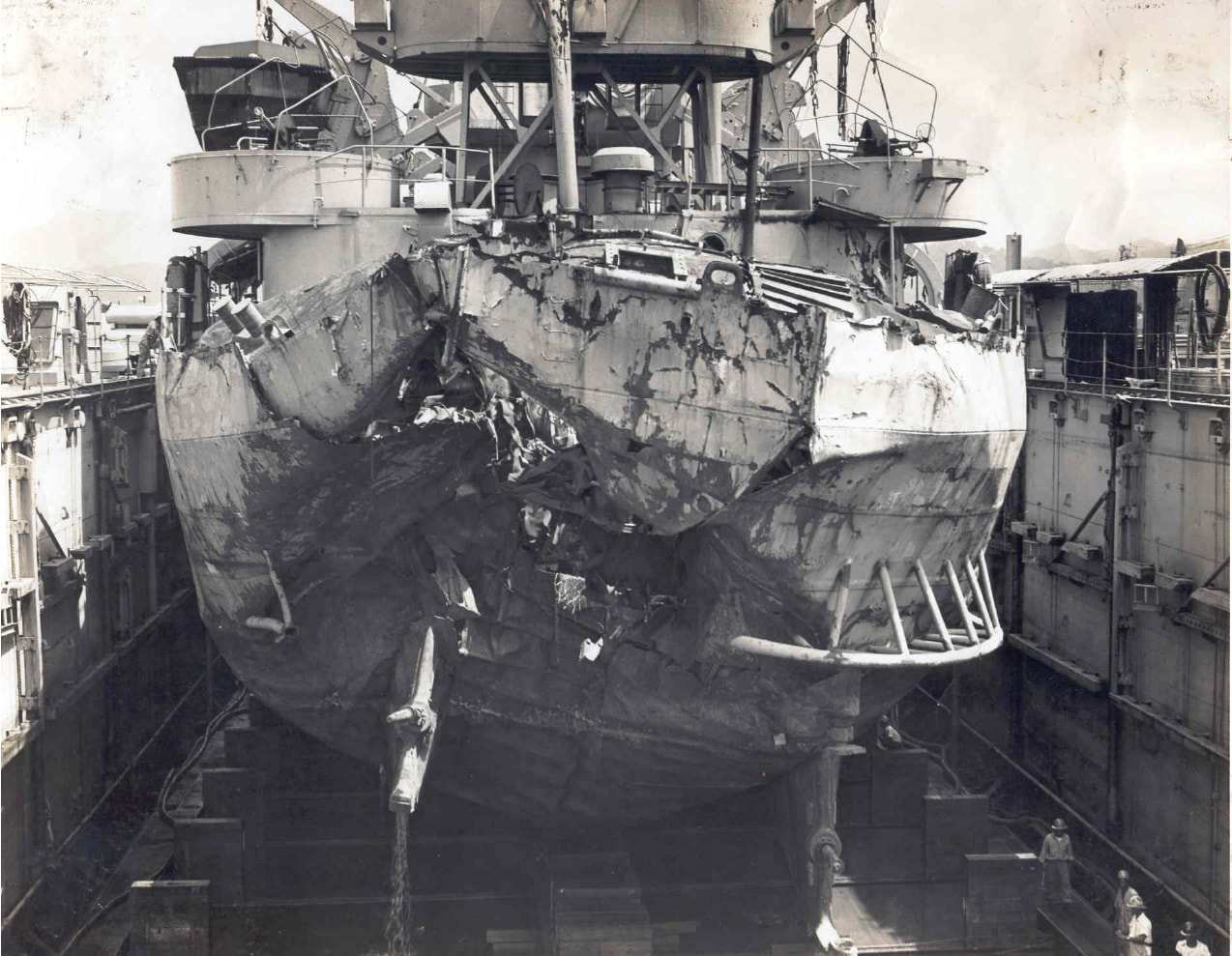
ROCS Chung Hai after being hit on the stern by a torpedo from a People's Liberation Army's torpedo boat during the naval battle on August 24, 1958

USS LST-755 was a LST-542-class tank landing ship in the United States Navy during World War II. She was commissioned in 1944 and participated in the Philippines campaign before being decommissioned in 1946. That year, she was transferred to the Republic of China Navy as ROCS Chung Hai (LST-201).

During the First and Second Taiwan Straight Crises, she was damaged by Communist forces twice. After being crippled at the battle Dongding Island during the Second Crisis, she was towed off for repairs and operated the rest of her career in Taiwanese service. She was decommissioned in 2010 with several groups vying to have her either scrapped, sunk, or restored.

As of 2021, the ship is awaiting restoration as a museum ship in Tainan City, Taiwan.

== Construction and commissioning ==
LST-755 was laid down on 20 May 1944 by the American Bridge Company in Ambridge, Pennsylvania. She was launched on 11 July 1944 and commissioned on 3 August.

== American Service ==
During World War II, LST-755 was assigned to the Asiatic-Pacific theater. She participated in the Lingayen Gulf landings from 13 January 1945 to 18 January 1945. Between 17 and 23 April, she was a part of the Mindanao Island landings in the Philippines. At the end of the war, she was ordered to support occupation forces and was stationed in China in September.

The ship was decommissioned on 29 May 1946 and struck from the Naval Register on 12 March 1948.

== Kuomintang Service ==
On 16 July 1946, President Truman approved the China Aid Act, allowing him to authorize the transfer of up to 271 warships to the Republic of China (RoC).

LST-755 was one of the first ships to be transferred and was commissioned into the Republic of China Navy on 29 May 1946, now under the name of ROCS Chung Hai (LST-201).

In 1946, Chung Hai supported the peaceful recapture of several islands in the South China Sea that were under Japanese occupation during the Second World War. Between 1947 and 1951, she was used to supply Dongsha island.

=== Chinese Civil War ===
During the Chinese Civil War, fought between the Kuomintang (RoC) and the Chinese Communist Party (CCP), the ship participated in campaigns in Tashan, Zhoushan Islands, and the relief of Jinzhou. Following the routing of the Yingkou 52nd Army by Lin Biao, Chung Hai was used to cover the force's retreat in Liaoxi.

During the Battle of Wanshan Islands, she was attacked by the gunboat Jiefang on May 25, 1950. Chung Hai and destroyer escort Taihe returned fire, injuring or killing 16 of 19 crewmembers on the Jiefang. Among those killed on the gunboat was Captain Lin Wenhui, deputy of the Communist People's Liberation Army Navy (PLAN) fleet. Following Wenhui's death, he was honored as a hero by the PLAN.

==== Taiwan Strait Crises ====
In January 1955, the landing ship transported commander of Kuomintang forces Colonel Wang Shengming and a load of coal for the upcoming battle of Yijiangshan Island. Halfway through the voyage, the ship anchored off Dachen Island when she was attacked by two Mig-15s on the 10th. Two bombs pierced through her main deck and struck her cargo of coal, yet failed to explode.

On 4 August 1958, she was in the process of being unloaded in Dongding Island when CCP forces attempted to repel the landing. At 18:30 local time, coastal artillery shelled the bay the LST and her accompanying fleet were located in. After being hit by two 130 mm shells, Chung Hai abandoned attempts her to continue and withdrew out of range of the enemy artillery. Now in the open ocean, the fleet was harassed by 9 PLAN torpedo boats. The previously unnoticed attacking boats closed in on the group at about 19:10, disrupting the Kuomintang's formation as they tried to evade.

At 20:25, PLAN torpedo boats 105 and 180 approached Chung Hai and fired four torpedoes. One torpedo struck her stern; the resulting explosion knocked out her engine and radar. Another torpedo attack on the Taisheng caused a catastrophic explosion on board, sinking the ship in about 5 minutes. As the boats withdrew, remaining Kuomintang ships, including Xiangjiang (PC-103), Mei Song (LSM-347), and the damaged Chung Hai opened fire, sinking the torpedo boat 175. Following the action, eight crewmembers onboard Chung Hai were killed and another 12 injured. The PLAN states that it sunk 2 enemy vessels and damaged another in the action, listing 175 as its only loss. Kuomintang sources initially announced that it sunk 8 enemy boats, however reports were later clarified to state that only one enemy vessel was sunk.

=== Taiwanese Service ===
Following the action off Dongding Island, the damaged Chung Hai was towed to Subic Bay Naval Base, a US Navy facility in the Philippines for repairs. Her stern was replaced at a cost of about US$500,000.

Some time later, old LSTs in Kuomintang (now Taiwanese) service were refurbished with new engines and expanded bridges. She was decommissioned on 1 February 2010.

=== Restoration ===
In 2018, Chung Hai was labeled an 'Important Antiquity', preventing her from being sold off or dismantled in hopes that she could be preserved as a museum ship. An attempt by the Kinmen County Government to preserve her in Kinmen Island failed due to a lack of funding. Despite her protected status, the ship was in such a poor condition that she was sold for scrap on 19 May 2020. The Taiwanese Navy expressed interest in sinking her as a floating target, but the public backlash from destroying the ship ended attempts to scrap her.

As of 2021, she is sitting in Qijin, Kaohsiung awaiting restoration. The ship is planned to be docked at the Mo Niang Memorial Park in Anping District, Tainan City. She will join Tainan Chenggong, a Ming Zheng period sailing ship, and ROCS Te Yang (DDG-925) as park attractions.

== Awards ==
LST-755 have earned the following awards while in American service:

- China Service Medal (extended)
- American Campaign Medal
- Asiatic-Pacific Campaign Medal (2 battle stars)
- World War II Victory Medal
- Navy Occupation Service Medal (with Asia clasp)
- Philippine Presidential Unit Citation
- Philippine Liberation Medal (2 battle stars)

== Sources ==
- United States. Dept. of the Treasury (1962). Treasury Decisions Under the Customs, Internal Revenue, Industrial Alcohol, Narcotic and Other Laws, Volume 97. U.S. Government Printing Office.
- Moore, Capt. John (1984). Jane's Fighting Ships 1984-85. Jane's Information Group. ISBN 978-0710607959.
- Saunders, Stephen (2009). Jane's Fighting Ships 2009-2010. Jane's Information Group. ISBN 978-0710628886.
- Fairplay International Shipping Journal Volume 222. United Kingdom: Fairplay Publishing Limited. 1967.
