= Xiao Jinguang =

Chinese revolutionary and military leader (1903–1989)

- 萧劲光
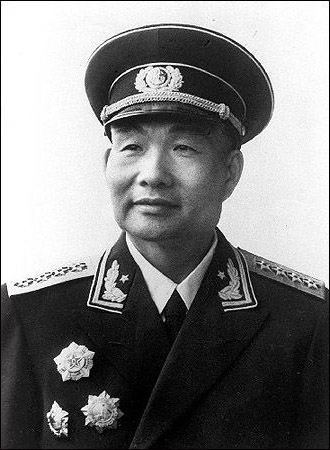
- Official Portrait of Xiao Jinguang

Commander of the People's Liberation Army Navy
- In office January 1950 – January 1980
- Preceded by: Office established
- Succeeded by: Ye Fei

President of Dalian Naval Academy
- In office 1949–1952
- Preceded by: New title
- Succeeded by: Chen Fuzhang

Commander of the PLA Hunan Military District
- In office August 1949 – March 1950
- Preceded by: New title
- Succeeded by: Huang Kecheng

Personal details
- Born: Xiao Yucheng (萧玉成); January 4, 1903 Shanhua County, Hunan, Qing China
- Died: March 29, 1989 (aged 86) Beijing, China
- Party: Chinese Communist Party
- Spouse(s): Zhu Zhongzhi; Wei Tao
- Children: 7
- Education: Communist University of the Toilers of the East; Soviet Red Army School; Lenin Military-Political Academy
- Nickname: Man Ge (满哥)

Military service
- Allegiance: People's Republic of China
- Branch/service: Chinese Red Army; Eighth Route Army; People's Liberation Army Ground Force; People's Liberation Army Navy
- Years of service: 1925–1980
- Rank: Fleet Admiral
- Battles/wars: Northern Expedition; Second Sino-Japanese War; Chinese Civil War
- Awards: Order of Bayi (First Class Medal) Order of Independence and Freedom (First Class Medal) Order of Liberation (First Class Medal)

Chinese name
- Simplified Chinese: 萧劲光
- Traditional Chinese: 蕭勁光
Transcriptions
Standard Mandarin
- Hanyu Pinyin: Xiāo Jìnguāng

Alternative Chinese name
- Simplified Chinese: 萧玉成
- Traditional Chinese: 蕭玉成
Transcriptions
Standard Mandarin
- Hanyu Pinyin: Xiāo Yùchéng

Xiao Jinguang (Chinese: 萧劲光 or 肖劲光; pinyin: Xiāo Jìnguāng; Former name Xiao Yucheng 萧玉成 Nickname: Man Ge 满哥) (January 4, 1903 – March 29, 1989) was a revolutionary and military leader, one of the main leaders of the Red Army and the People's Liberation Army, and one of the ten senior generals of the PLA and the only Fleet Admiral in PLA Navy history.

From 1954 to 1982, Xiao served as the Deputy Minister of National Defense, and from 1979 to 1983 as the Vice Chairman of the Fifth National People's Congress Standing Committee.

== Early life ==
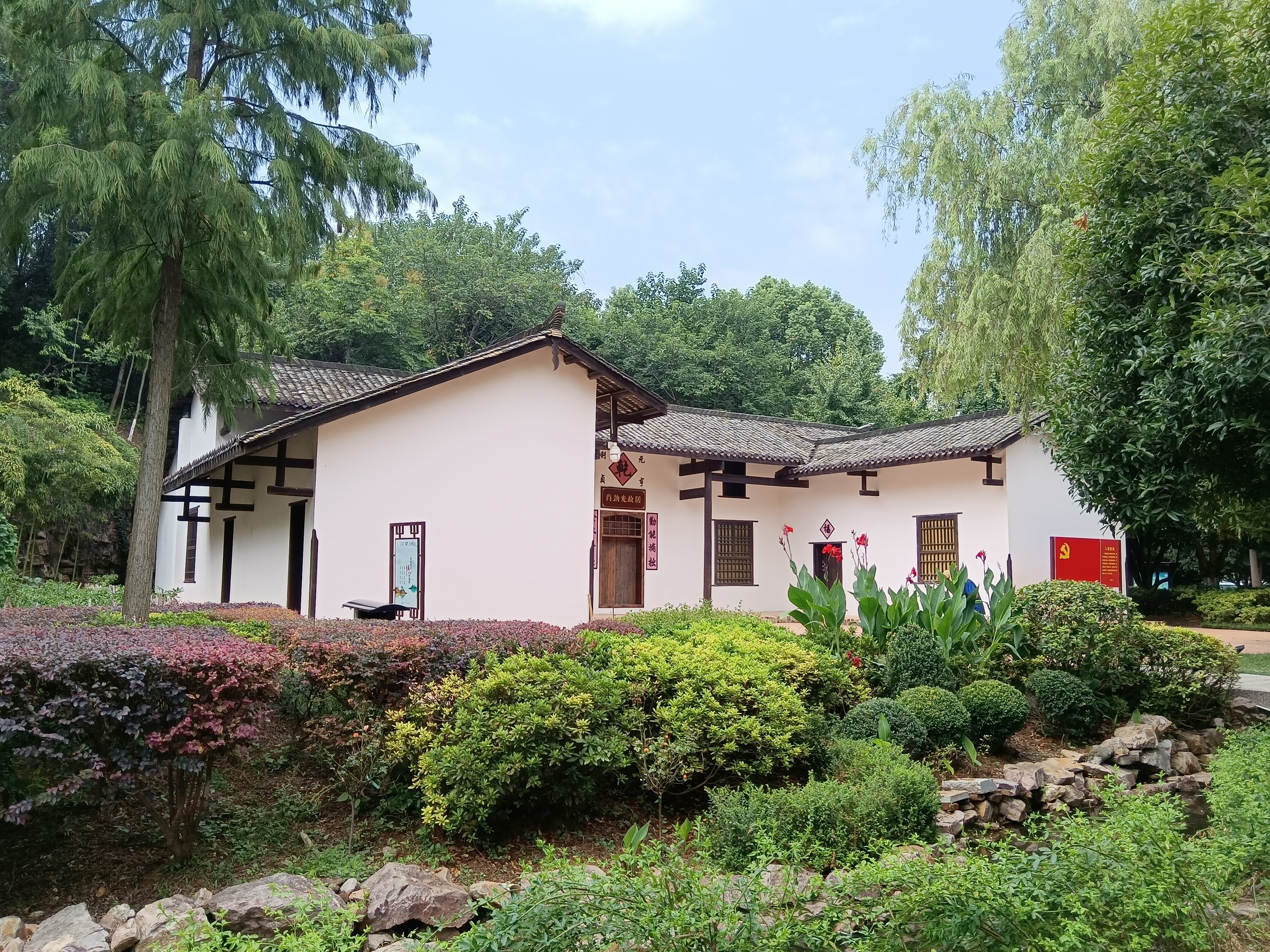
Former Residence of Xiao Jinguang in Changsha

Xiao was born into a poor family in Shanhua County (now Changsha), Hunan province. At the age of two, his father and grandfather died in quick succession. In 1917 Xiao was admitted to the Changsha Changjun High School. In 1919, influenced by the May Fourth Movement, Xiao and his classmates joined strikes, parades, and the boycott of Japanese goods. In 1920, Xiao joined the Research Society of Russia with his friend Ren Bishi, and listened to the speeches of famous social activists in Hunan including Mao Zedong and He Shuheng. In August, Xiao and Ren joined the "Foreign Language Society", established by the Shanghai Communist Group for the young to study in Russia. They went to the Communist University of the Toilers of the East in 1921, and became members of the first Chinese students' group of the university, where they studied Karl Marx's The Communist Manifesto, Vladimir Lenin's Youth League, and Nikolai Bukharin's Communism ABC. Xiao became a Communist Party member in 1922. Two years later, he returned to China and engaged in the workers' movement.

In 1926, Xiao was officially appointed as the representative of the Sixth Division of the Second Army of the National Revolutionary Army, awarded the rank of lieutenant general, and participated in the Northern Expedition. In 1927, Xiao married Zhu Zhongzhi (朱仲芷) in Wuhan. In September of the same year, Xiao was sent to the Soviet Union to study strategics.

== Encirclement campaigns and the Long March ==
After returning to China in 1930, Xiao took up the post of Chief of Staff and Director of the Political Department of Fujian, Guangdong and Jiangxi Military Region and participated in the Counter-Campaign against "Encirclement and Suppression". In 1931, Xiao was appointed Political commissar of the fifth corps of the Central Red Army, responsible for its strengthening and transforming it.

In 1933, as the Commander of Fujian and Jiangxi Provincial Military District, Xiao was defeated in a battle in Huchuan (浒川), Jiangxi. The leaders of "Leftism" Wang Ming blamed Xiao for losing Lichuan (黎川) to the enemy, expelled him from CCP and sentenced him to five years' imprisonment. Fortunately, due to the effort of Mao Zedong and others, Xiao Jinguang was released to the Red Army University as a teacher and participated in the Long March with the Central Red Army. Owing to Xiao's contribution in defending the security of the Central Committee of Party, during the Zunyi Conference, the Party Central Committee corrected the erroneous treatment of Xiao Jinguang. Xiao was soon appointed Chief of Staff of the third corps of the First Red Army.

In 1935, the three armies converged in Shaanxi which meant the victory of the Long March. Xiao, as the Commander of Shaanxi and Gansu Military District, continued to consolidate the communists' base area.

== Second Sino-Japanese War ==
In March 1937, Xiao Jinguang was transferred to the Central Revolutionary Military Commission in Yan'an, where Xiao worked a full eight years. On July 7, 1937, the Marco Polo Bridge Incident triggered the Second Sino-Japanese War. Xiao attended the Luochuan Meeting from August 22 to 25. For the defense of the location of the CPC Central Committee—the Shanxi-Gansu-Ningxia Border Region, the Central Military Commission set up in border area stay forces and also the Eighth Route Army Rear Headquearters for the unified command, and Xiao was appointed director. In the meantime, Xiao eliminated the bandits to defend the Party Central Committee, to consolidate and expand the stay forces. In August 1938, the Eighth Route Army Rear Headquearters was renamed the Eighth Route Army Stay Corps, Xiao was appointed commander (concurrently political commissar later). Under the command of the Xiao, Stay Corps defensing the River (the Yellow River) operated more than 70 combats against the Japanese armies, giving the enemy a heavy blow, successfully defended the Shaanxi-Gansu-Ningxia Border Region."

Throughout the whole stage of The Second Sino-Japanese War, out of the class nature, the Kuomintang diehards fought negatively Japanese and opposed positively communist. In and near the Shaanxi-Gansu-Ningxia Border Region, they never stopped the manufacturing of friction events. In the struggle against frictions, Xiao was very particular about the policies and strategies taken to distinguish between the attitudes towards the Kuomintang diehards and centrists: struggling resolutely against the diehards who specializes in the manufacture of frictions, and gaining actively over those Kuomintang generals who had the friendly centrist attitude on certain issues." In the meantime, in the face of the Kuomintang's economic blockade, Xiao led the broad officers of Stay Corps, with masses and soldiers in the border areas, to launch the great production campaign which made Nanniwan "a good Jiangnan" in northern Shanxi (the Song "Nanniwan" is an apt reflection of this situation). Mao Zedong once said humorously: "I have told you that in Yan'an, we eat by relying on you Xiao!" In the Yan'an Rectification Movement from 1941 to 1945, Xiao strengthened the learning and the research in military theories and published "Guerrilla Warfare Guiding Essentials", "Close Combat Tactics" and other articles. In May 1942, Stay Corps was attached to the Shanxi-Gansu-Ningxia-Shanxi-Suiyuan United Defence Army. On September 15, Stay Corps Command and United Defence Army Command merged, while the name of stay Corps Command was retained. In May 1945, Xiao attended the Party's Seventh National People's Congress, and was elected the alternate CPC member."

== Chinese Civil War ==
After Japan surrendered on August 15, 1945, Xiao Jinguang transferred to the Deputy Commander and the Chief of Staff of the Shandong Military Area. On arriving in Henan, Xiao received a telegram of the CPC Central Committee, and then went to Shenyang, took up the Deputy Commander and the Chief of Staff of " the General Headquarters of the Northeast People's Autonomous Army (soon renamed the Northeast Democratic United Forces)". At that time, the KMT attempted to seize the Northeast. A year’s research made Xiao quite familiar with the military formation of the Northeast. In the same year, Xiao drafted the famous "Report of the military form and forces situation of the Northeast. Wars in the Northeast was just around the corner. Xiao volunteered to rush to South Manchuria with Chen Yun. After three months of fighting, the Liaodong Military Region Command won all the 4 battles in defending Linjiang and recovered more than 10 major cities and towns adjacent to Linjiang in close collaboration with the Northeast Democratic United Forces. After this, the KMT changed from the offensive strategy to the defensive strategy in the Northeast while the Democratic United Forces from defensive to offensive." At that time, Changchun had a very important strategic position. In March 1948, the Northeast Field Army cut off the Beining and the Zhongchang Railways, then Changchun was isolated in the Songliao Plain. After much discussion, taking Mao's criticism and instructions, Lin Biao drew up the program of "In 2–4 months time, carry out a longer-term encircling of Changchun in order to annihilate the enemy relief force and then take the city". The mission was served by Xiao, the Deputy Commander of the Northeast Field Army and also the Commander of the First Front-line Command Post. Through shouting our army's propaganda in the position, carrying the propaganda placed in a wooden box over the moat and other simple methods, our army created a strong political campaign and achieved a remarkable success. Three months later, the city was in a mess. Zhou Enlai induced personally Zheng Dongguo, the Deputy Commander of the Headquarters of Bandit Suppression of the Northeast and the Commander of the First Corps of the KMT, to capitulate. At last, Zheng surrendered. On November 2, the Liaoning-Shenyang Campaign came to an end, and the whole Northeast was liberated. Later that month, Xiao led his troops to attend the Beiping-Tianjin Campaign." After the Beiping-Tianjin Campaign, the People's Liberation Army was once again reorganized. The First Corps of the Northeast Field Army, which was commanded by Xiao, was renamed the PLA's XII Corps of the Fourth Field Army. At the end of February 1949, having received the orders of the Military Commission of the CPC Central Committee, Xiao led his troops to leave Beijing, marching along the Ping-Han Railway to Central China. All the way, Xiao led the advance Corps to attack with irresistible force. After the liberation of Wuhan, Xiao was appointed the Command of the city garrison. In mid-July, the XII Corps, which was commanded by Xiao, and the other four Field Armies liberated Yichang, Shashi, Changde and the vast areas of Hunan and Jiangxi. In early September, the Military Commission of the CPC Central Committee issued the combat mission against Bai Chongxi and Song Xilian troops. In the Hengbao Battle (September 13 to October 16), which was initiated according to the mission, the army led by Xiao with the army led by Cheng Zihua, annihilated more than 47000 enemy at the cost of four thousand casualties."

== After the establishment of the PRC ==
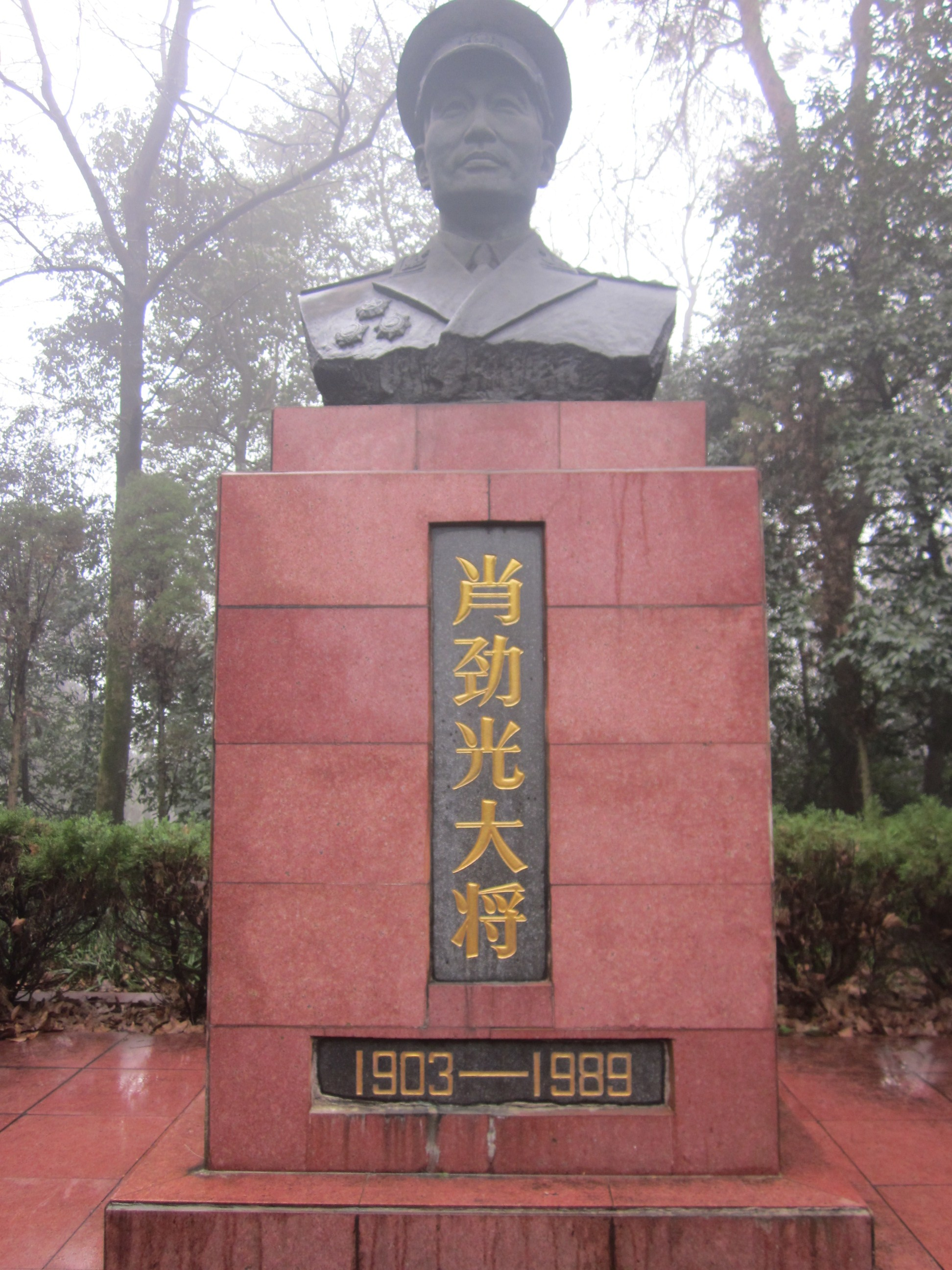
The bronze statue of Xiao Jinguang, located in Yuelu Mountain, Changsha, Hunan, China.

Shortly after the founding of the People's Republic of China, Xiao was invited to establish the leading organs of People's Liberation Army Navy. On January 12, 1950, Xiao was appointed as Commander of the Chinese People's Liberation Army Navy and also served as the president and political commissar of the Dalian Naval Academy. Meanwhile, he was involved in the expansion of the PLA Naval Aviation University and Naval Artillery School. In August 1950, Xiao hosted the navy meeting to determine specific guidelines for the early construction of the People's Liberation Army Navy: "Firstly, to build a modern offensive and defensive force which is offshore, light, agile, combat power. Secondly, to carry out the attacks-destroyed on the sea theory." At the same time, Xiao set about establishing the North Sea Fleet, East Sea Fleet and South Sea Fleet, and built the PRC's first maritime defense system.

In April 1952, a delegation led by Xiao visited the Soviet Union for solving the problem of naval weapons and equipment. In 1954, Xiao advocated a three-step development strategy for naval weapons and equipment:

1. getting aid via complete sets of foreign materials, equipment and technology
2. digesting and absorbing foreign technology via imitation and gradually achieving self-sufficiency
3. China designing naval weapons and equipment by itself, using domestic materials, tools, and facilities

In September, Xiao was appointed Vice-Minister of Defense of People's Republic of China.

Xiao led naval forces for the first time in January 1955. Working with ground forces and air forces together in joint operations against coastal islands held by Nationalist troops, PRC forces captured the Yijiangshan Islands. In February, they captured the Dachen Islands, the Yushan Islands, and Pishan Island.

In March he participated in the reception of the Soviet military equipment in Lüshunkou. In September 1955, Xiao gained the military award of the ten senior commanders of the PLA, Prime August-1st military Medal (八一勋章), Prime Medal of Freedom and independence (一级独立自由勋章), Prime Liberal Medal (一级解放勋章) at the same time. He also served as a member of the first National Defense Commission of the People's Republic of China (1954–1959), and was reappointed to the two subsequent commissions (1959–1964 and 1965–1975). In June 1956, he attended the first Congress of Party Representatives and proposed the theory that "our work base on the existing power and focus on the air force, the submarine and the torpedo boat." In September 1956, he was elected as a member of the Central Committee. In September 1958, Xiao led the soldiers of Navy, Air Force and Ground Force, to bombard Kinmen Island (Quemoy).

In 1962, he was ostracized by Lin Biao, but in March 1965, Xiao Jinguang still served as a member of the third session of the National People's Congress. On August 6, the People's Liberation Army Navy engaged with ROCN, sinking the ROC gunboats Zhangjiang and Jianmen. In January 1967 Xiao was criticized by error, and was deprived of the presiding work of Navy. In 1971, after the Lin Biao incident, Xiao returned to his work in the navy and took charge of producing nuclear-powered submarines (resulting in the Type 092) and guided-missile destroyers. However, at that moment, he was under pressure from the Cultural Revolution and Gang of Four, falsely accused of having "boarded Lin Biao's pirate ship." But Mao Zedong declared that: "Xiao is a lifetime naval commander, when he is alive, no one can substitute."

In August 1973, he was elected as a member of the 10th Central Congress. In 1975, he worked as a member of the Third National People's Congress. In October 1976, Xiao met with Marshal Ye Jianying, and suggested to clear the Gang of Four (四人帮). In August 1977, he was elected as a member of the 11th Central Congress. On May 5, 1979, the CPC Central Committee rehabilitated Xiao's unjust verdict, and in the following month he was elected as the vice chairman of the fifth Standing Committee of the National People's Congress. In January 1980, Xiao Jinguang retired from the Navy leadership positions; and two years later he worked as a member of the Advisory Committee of the CPC Central Committee (中共中央顾问委员会)."

== Death ==
Xiao Jinguang died in Beijing on 29 March 1989 from colon cancer. After the funeral, his ashes were subsequently scattered at sea, according to his wishes. Xiao was eulogized as a "great Marxist, great Proletarian Revolutionary, military strategist, one of the main leaders of People's Liberation Army Navy.

== Family ==
Wife

- Zhu Zhongzhi (朱仲芷): daughter of famous revolutionary educator Zhu Jianfan (朱剑凡), married Xiao in 1927.

Sons

- Xiao Yongding (萧永定): Former Vice Minister of Ministry of Light Industry
- Xiao Ceneng (萧策能): Former deputy director of the Hainan Economic Co-operation Department
- Xiao Zhuoneng (萧卓能): Former General Manager of China National Offshore Technology Corporation, husband of famous singer Li Guyi (李谷一)
- Xiao Boying (萧伯膺): Senior officer of PLA, Lieutenant General
- Xiao Jilong (萧纪龙): Party secretary of Beijing Stone Inscription Art Museum

Daughters

- Xiao Kai (萧凯)
- Xiao Nan (萧楠)

Military offices
New title	Commander of the PLA Hunan Military District; 1949–1950	Succeeded by Huang Kecheng
New title	Commander of the People's Liberation Army Navy; 1950–1980	Succeeded by Ye Fei
Educational offices
New title	President of Dalian Naval Academy; 1949–1952	Succeeded by Chen Fuzhang
