= Battle of Yijiangshan Islands =

1955 battle in the Chinese Civil War

Coordinates: 28.61°N 121.82°E

- Part of the First Taiwan Strait Crisis
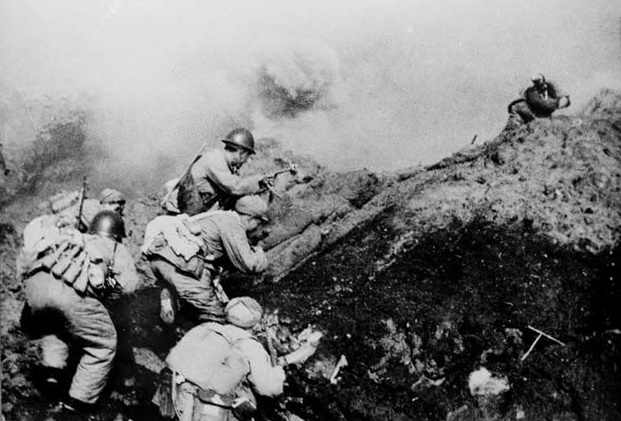
- Communist troops assaulting Nationalist positions
Date	18–19 January 1955 (1 day)
Location	Yijiangshan Islands
Result	People's Republic of China victory
Territorial changes	People's Republic of China captures Yijiangshan

Belligerents
Republic of China (Taiwan)	People's Republic of China

Commanders and leaders
Wang Sheng-ming †	Zhang Aiping

Strength
1,100 troops; 8–12 ships	10,000 personnel; 184 aircraft; 186 ships

The Battle of Yijiangshan Islands occurred during the First Taiwan Strait Crisis in January 1955 when the People's Republic of China (PRC) attacked and captured the islands from the Republic of China (ROC). The loss of the Yijiangshans forced the ROC to abandon the Dachen Islands to the PRC. The Chinese People's Liberation Army (PLA) considers the battle as its first joint operation.

== Background ==
After the Chinese Civil War, the ROC staged attacks on the local PRC coast from the Dachen Islands. Holding the two Yijiangshan islands, which were closer to the coast, contributed to the defense of the Dachens. The ROC regarded defending the Yijiangshans as impractical but valuable for psychological warfare and maintaining American support.

In August 1954, the PLA's East China Military Region formed the Eastern Zhejiang Front Command commanded by Zhang Aiping to lead the campaign. Improving interservice coordination was a major feature of planning and exercises; this was aided by Soviet advisors. The landing force was four battalions from the 60th Infantry Division. Intelligence gathering and reconnaissance started in September, and operations to gain air and naval superiority starting in November.

== Battle ==
The PLA landed on the Yijiangshans on 18 January 1955. PLA aircraft attacked ROC artillery and communication positions in the Yijiangshans and Dachens from 0800 to 1300 hours. The ground forces sailed in three columns and landed at 20 beaches from 1330 to 1500; gunboats gave close support while coastal artillery and aircraft suppressed ROC artillery. Two battalions from the 178th Infantry Regiment, with a third as follow-up landed on the north island, while one battalion from the 180th Infantry Regiment landed on the southern island. PLA aircraft forced back five ROC warships from the Dachens. The PLA quickly broke out of the beachheads and controlled the islands by 1750 on 19 January.

== Aftermath ==
The PRC reported its own losses as 393 casualties, and the ROC's as 519 killed and 567 captured. The ROC reported that the entire garrison of 720 was killed, and that over 3000 PLA troops were killed; the 720 figure was symbolically fabricated to be ten times the number of identified revolutionaries killed during the Second Guangzhou Uprising. A captured ROC soldier visited Taiwan in 2011.

The attack contributed to American support for the ROC. The US adopted the Formosa Resolution nine days after the PRC victory.

The loss of the Yijiangshans compromised the ROC defense system for the Dachens. The ROC evacuated the Dachens in February 1955 under the cover of the United States Navy and Air Force in Operation King Kong.
