= Taiwan missile crisis =

The Taiwan missile crisis may refer to:

- First Taiwan Strait Crisis, also known as the 1955 Taiwan Strait Crisis
- Second Taiwan Strait Crisis, also known as the 1958 Taiwan Strait Crisis
- Third Taiwan Strait Crisis, also known as the 1996 Taiwan Strait Crisis
