= Former Residence of Xiao Jinguang =

- 肖劲光故居
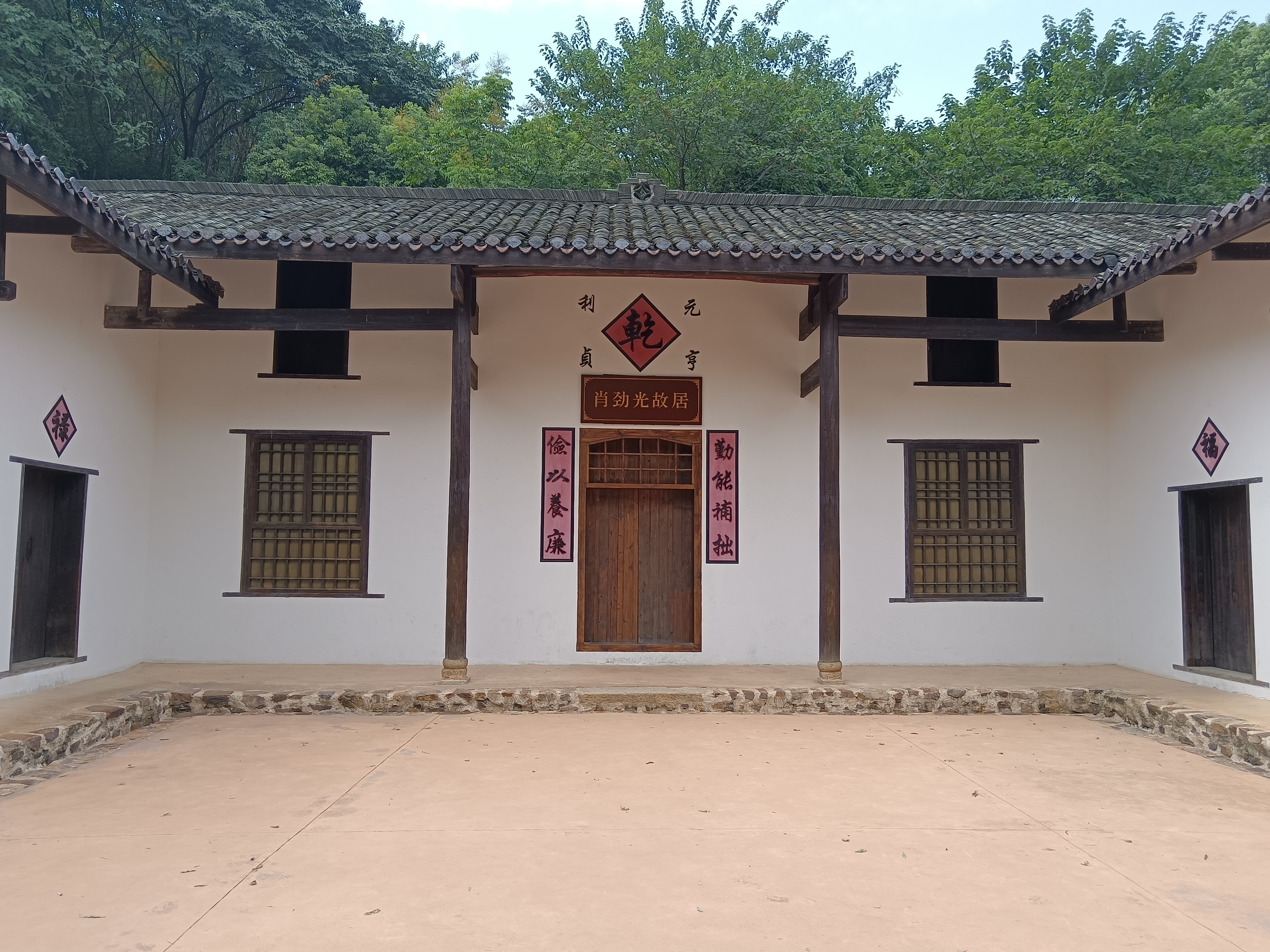
- Former Residence of Xiao Jinguang

- Location within Hunan

General information
- Type: Traditional folk houses
- Location: China
- Coordinates: 28°10′42″N 112°57′31″E
- Groundbreaking: Qing dynasty
- Opened: 1989
- Affiliation: Government of Changsha

Height
- Architectural: Chinese architecture

Technical details
- Material: Bricks, wood, tiles
- Floor area: 350 m^{2} (3,800 sq ft)
- Grounds: 700 m^{2} (7,500 sq ft)

The Former Residence of Xiao Jinguang (simplified Chinese: 肖劲光故居 or 萧劲光故居; traditional Chinese: 蕭勁光故居; pinyin: Xiāo Jìnguāng Gùjū) is located in front of the Tianma Mountain, in Changsha, Hunan, China. It has a building area of about 350-square-metre (3,800 sq ft), embodies buildings such as central room, wing rooms, and utility rooms.

== History ==
The Former Residence of Xiao Jinguang was originally built in the late Qing dynasty (1644–1911).

On 4 January 1903, Xiao Jinguang was born here, where he spent his childhood and youth as a student.

In 2011 it was inscribed as a provincial level cultural heritage site by the Government of Hunan and a provincial level patriotic education base by the Publicity Department of the Hunan Provincial Committee of the Chinese Communist Party.

== Gallery ==
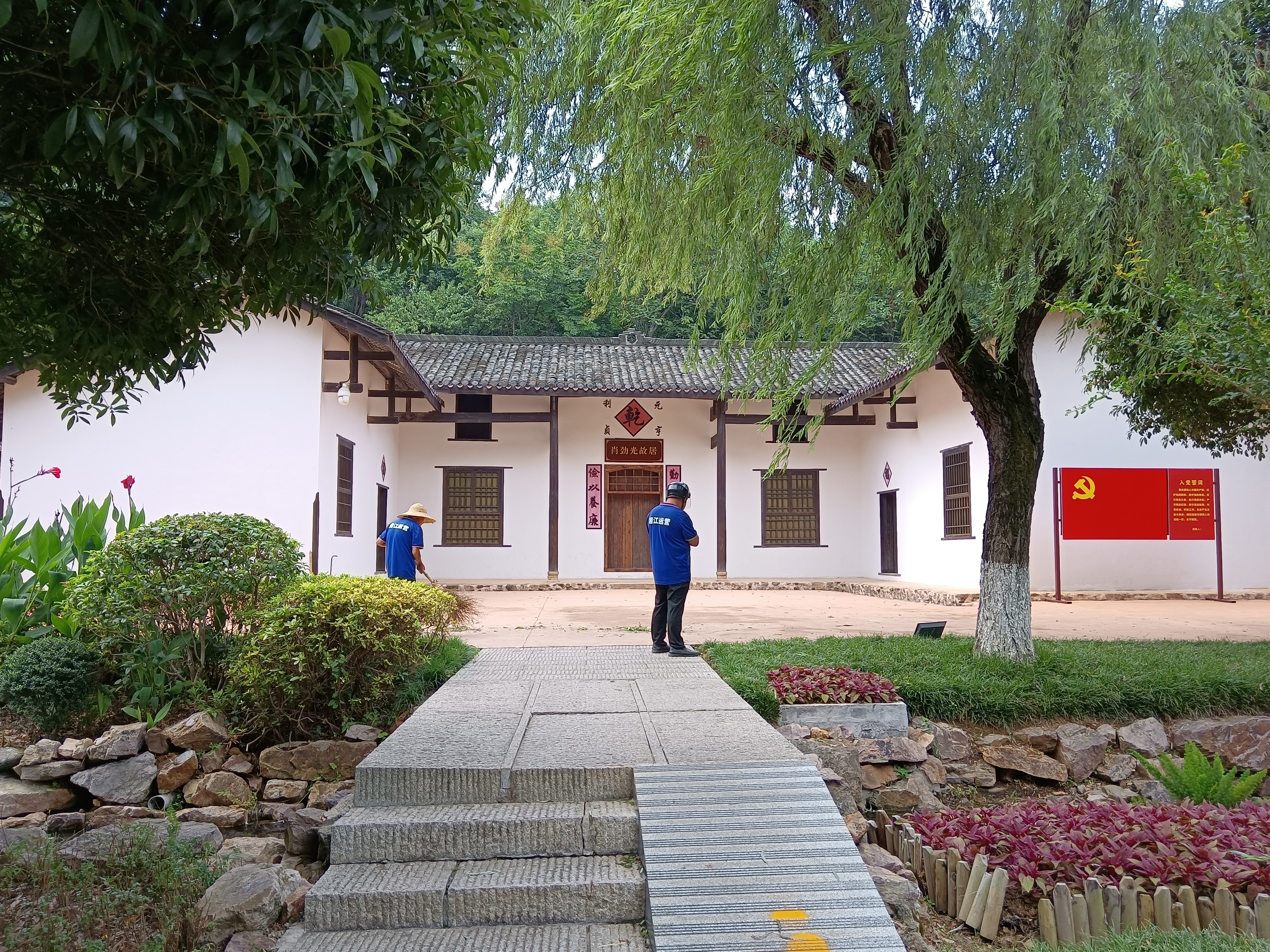
Former Residence of Xiao Jinguang

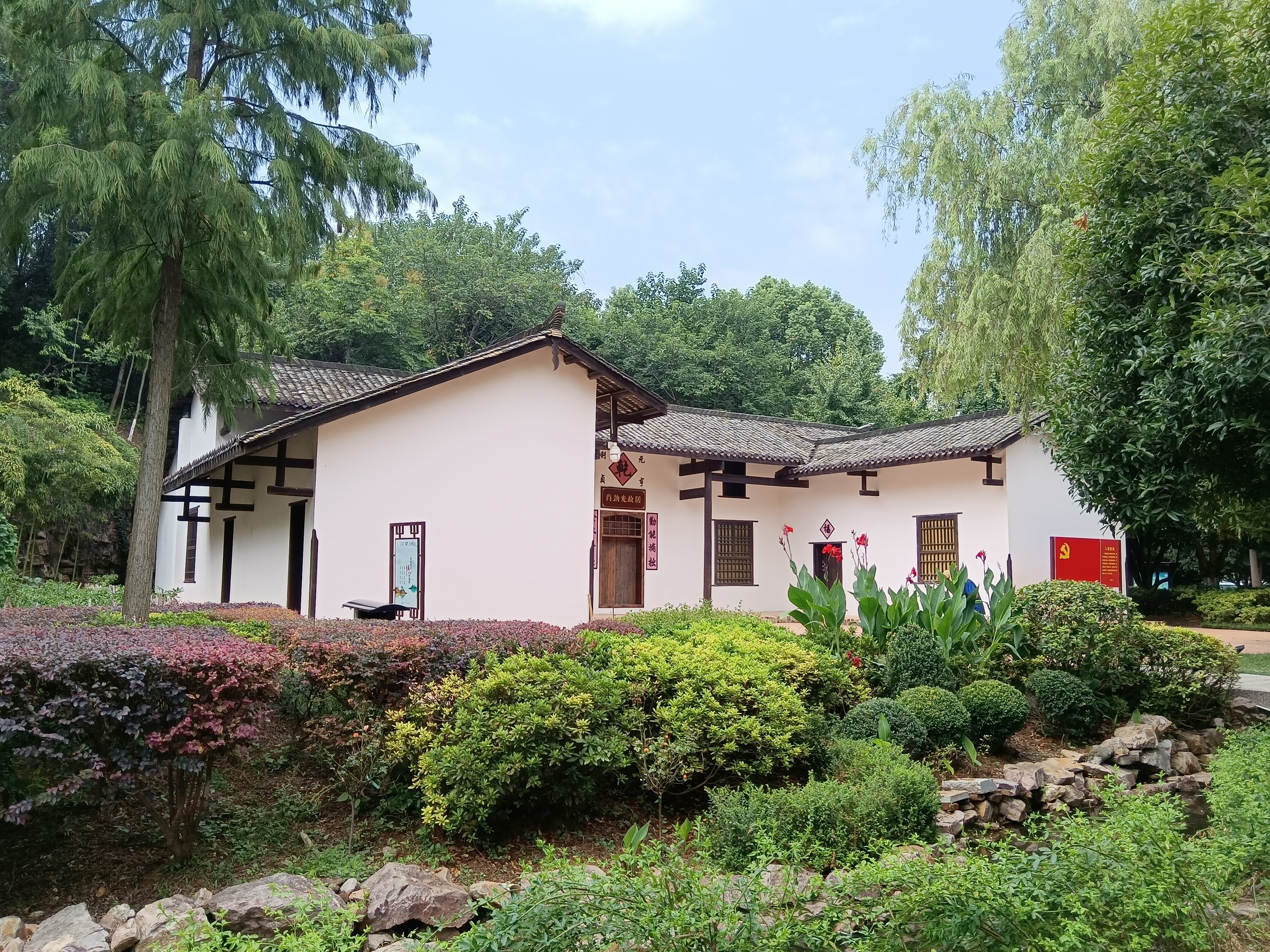
Former Residence of Xiao Jinguang

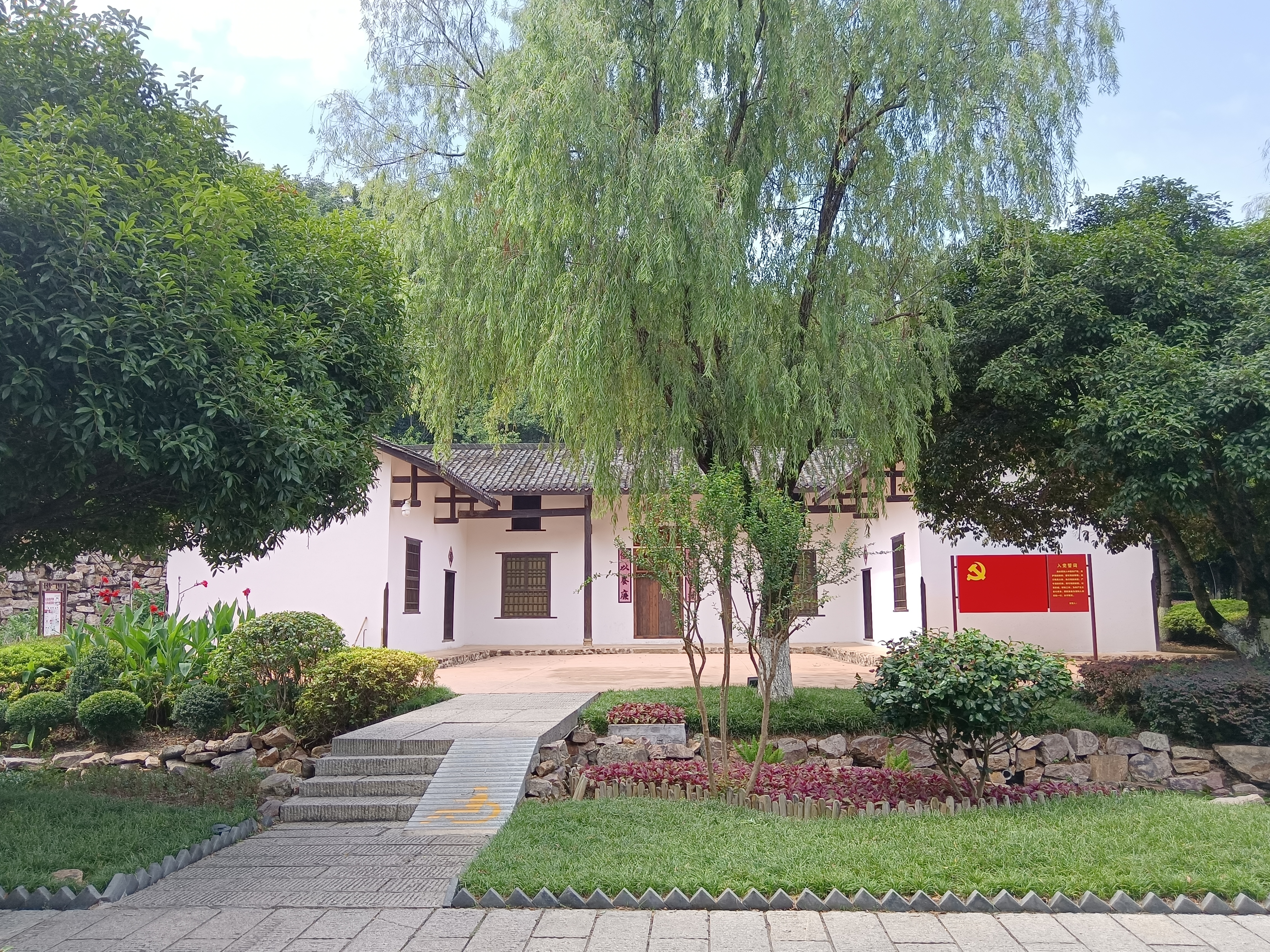
Former Residence of Xiao Jinguang
