= Wang Sheng-ming =

Chinese general (1910–1955)

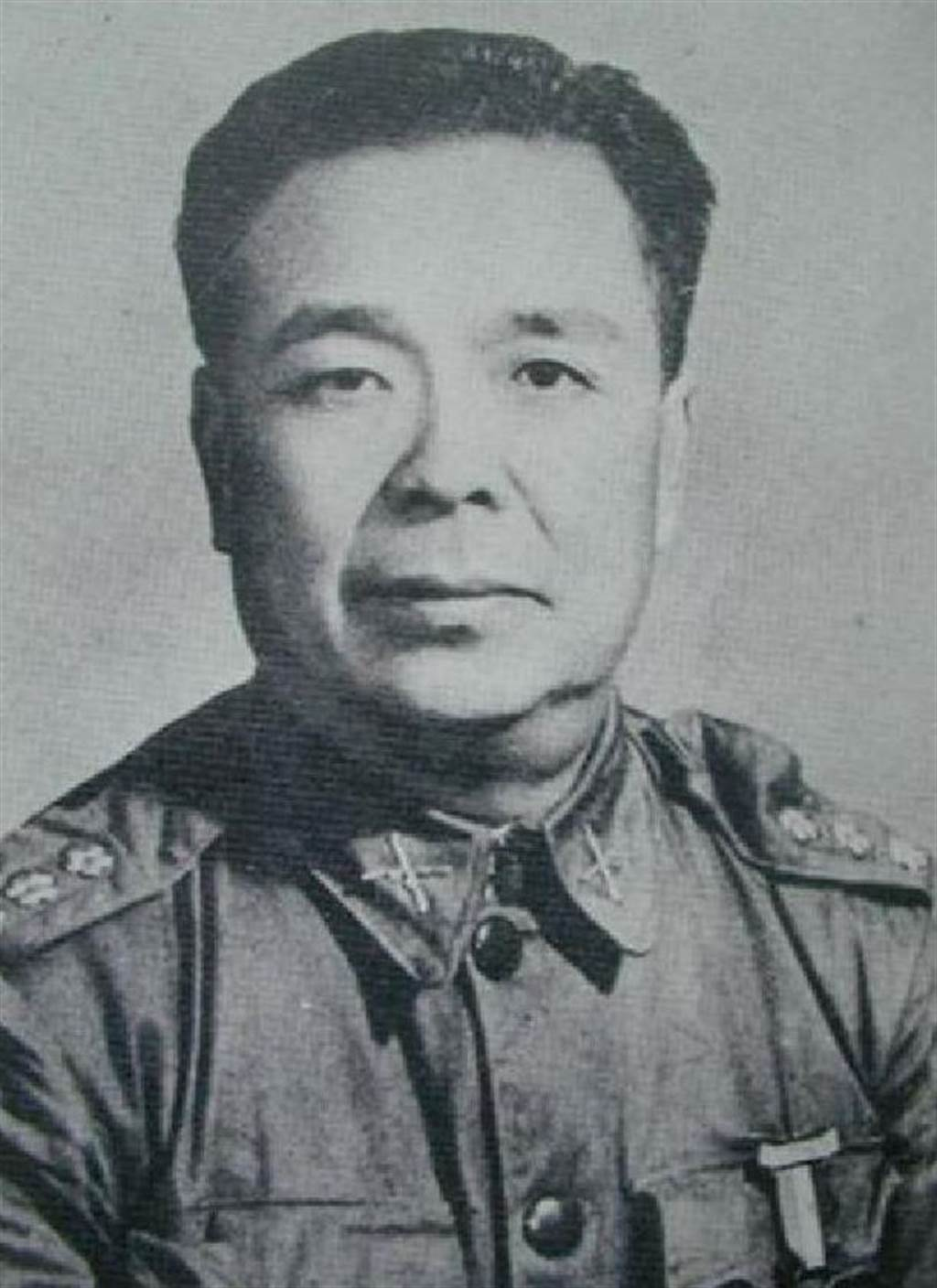
- Native name: 王生明
- Born: 25 March 1910; Qiyang, Hunan, Qing dynasty
- Died: 20 January 1955 (aged 44) Yijiangshan Islands, Zhejiang, Republic of China
- Buried: National Revolutionary Martyrs' Shrine
- Allegiance: Republic of China
- Branch: (Republic of China (1912–1949)) National Revolutionary Army
- Rank: Brigadier general (posthumously)
- Conflicts: Northern Expedition; Chinese Civil War; Encirclement campaigns; Second Sino-Japanese War; Battle of Shanghai; Battle of South Shanxi; Chinese Civil War; Battle of Yijiangshan Islands †

Wang Sheng-ming (25 March 1910 – 20 January 1955) was a former officer in the army of Hu Zongnan and a military officer in the Republic of China Army. During the Battle of Yijiangshan Islands, he led over 700 defenders to resist the People's Liberation Army for three days. His final words were, "The Communist forces are 50 meters away from me, and I only have one grenade left for myself."

== Life ==
Wang was a native of Xiaojia Village, Qiyang County, Hunan Province, with ancestral roots in Jiangxi. He attended a private school for two years during his childhood. At the age of 15, he enlisted in the military and participated in numerous battles, achieving distinguished military merits. He rose through the ranks from a reserve soldier to the position of regional commander.

In 1927, during the Northern Expedition of the National Revolutionary Army, the Battle of Nanjing saw Sun Chuanfang's forces, comprising White Russian mercenaries, and the advancing Northern Expeditionary forces repeatedly clash over control of the Yuhuatai area. At 17, Wang Sheng-ming served as a squad leader in the student battalion, capturing two White Russian mercenaries. He was subsequently promoted to second lieutenant platoon leader in the 40th Army and soon earned a promotion to lieutenant for his meritorious service in the Central Plains War.

Afterward, he participated in the encirclement of the Soviet region and was wounded in the Battle of Guangchang, which resulted in the heaviest losses for the Chinese Red Army. In 1935, Wang Sheng-ming led his troops to surround He Chang, the deputy director of the General Political Department of the Red Army, and He Chang committed suicide.

During the Second Sino-Japanese War in 1937, Wang Sheng-ming led his troops to participate in the Battle of Shanghai, where he held his ground at Wenzaobang. Only nine of his men survived. Afterward, he was repeatedly promoted by Hu Zongnan and participated in the battles of Zhongtiao Mountain and Zhuxian Town. By the end of the war, he had been promoted to the rank of colonel.

In 1949, after Hu Zongnan's forces were defeated and retreated to Xikang, Wang Sheng-ming gave up his position as the deputy division commander of the 198th Division stationed in Taiwan and followed Hu Zongnan to the Xikang military. He served as the deputy division commander of the 135th Division. Later, he joined Luo Lie in guerrilla warfare in Xikang. After exhausting their ammunition and supplies, he disguised himself and, in February 1950, managed to return to Taiwan.

After receiving training at the Ministry of National Defense's Political Officer Training Program, Wang Sheng-ming followed Hu Zongnan, who was using the alias Qin Dongchang, and was assigned to the position of deputy commander for the Yijiangshan area in the Dachen Defense Department. Shortly after, he succeeded as the deputy commander for the Nanjing area. Hu Zongnan reorganized over 30 independent guerrilla units into six battalions of the Anti-Communist Salvation Army, and the ships were reorganized into the Maritime Assault Task Force.

In August 1953, President Chiang Kai-shek decided to send regular troops to the Dachen Islands, deploying the 46th Army Division, with General Liu Lianyi, who had studied in the U.S., appointed as the Dachen Defense Commander, replacing Hu Zongnan. The 46th Army Division defended the main island of Dachen, while the Salvation Army was stationed on the surrounding islands, including Yijiangshan, Yushan, and Nanjing Island. In 1954, Liu Lianyi promoted Wang Sheng-ming to the position of commander, and in October of the same year, he was appointed as the commander of the Yijiangshan area.

On New Year's Day in 1955, Wang Sheng-ming was awarded first place in the 5th Battle Hero Awards, with the honor personally presented by then-President Chiang Kai-shek. Wang Sheng-ming knew that defending Yijiangshan Island would lead to certain death, so he ordered that in each family within his unit—whether husband and wife, brothers, or fathers and sons—one person must be evacuated.

On 18 January, the People's Liberation Army launched a fierce assault on Yijiangshan Islands. The Nationalist troops, 720 strong, resolutely held their ground and fought for three full days and nights, killing over 2,000 enemy soldiers. In the end, all of them heroically perished. Chiang Kai-shek posthumously promoted Colonel Wang Sheng-ming to the rank of Major General for his valor in the Battle of Yijiangshan. Wang Sheng-ming was honored by Chiang personally, who attended his memorial service, and he was enshrined in the National Revolutionary Martyrs' Shrine.

== Legacy ==
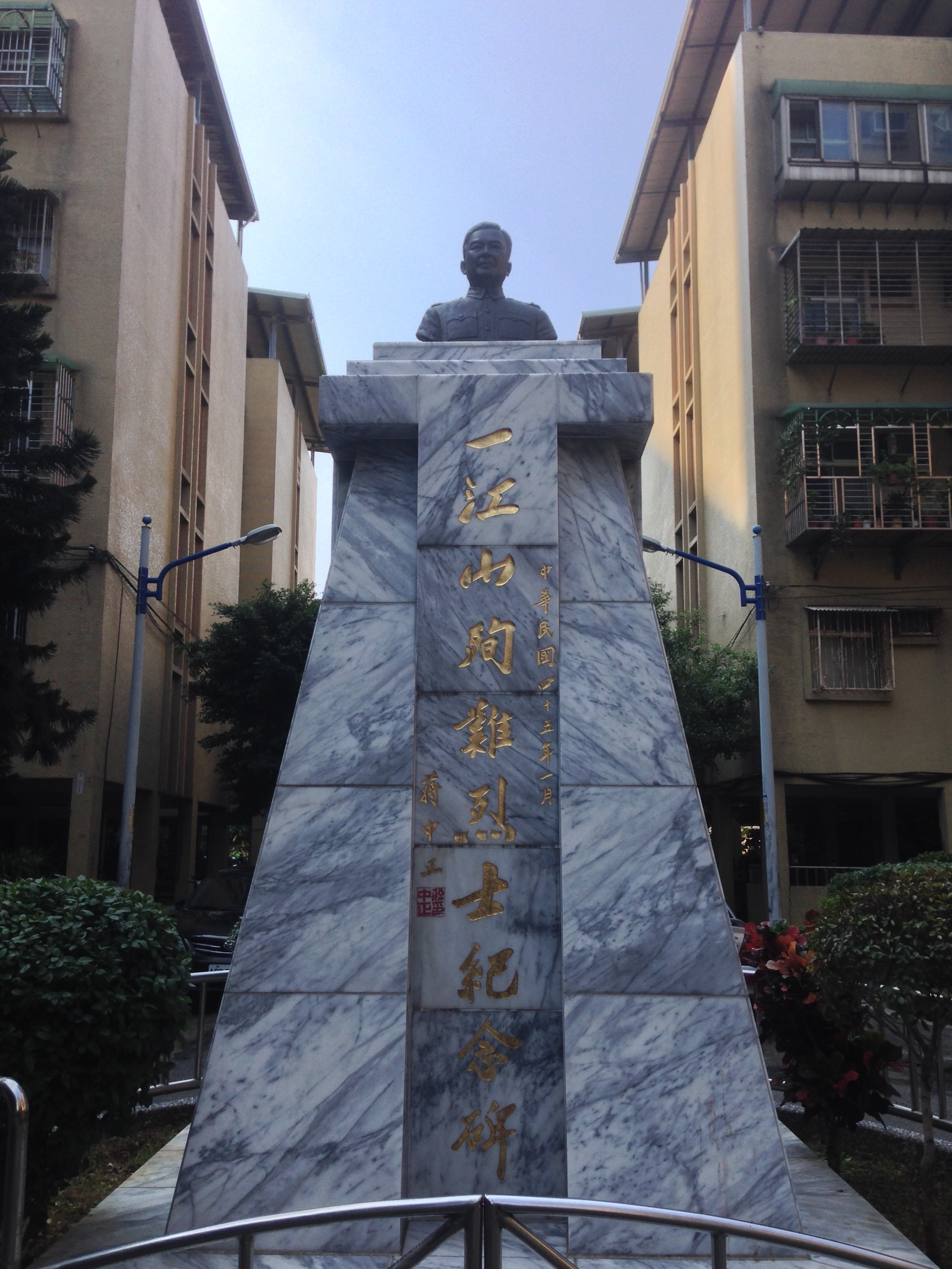
Yijiangshan Martyrs Memorial (with a sculpture of Wang Shengming above).

Wang Yingwen said at the memorial seminar for the anniversary of the Battle of Yijiangshan: Chiang Wei-kuo once mentioned to me that during the military meeting of that year, the late Chiang Kai-shek expressed approval of the determination of General Wang Sheng-ming and the officers and soldiers under his command who vowed to defend Yijiangshan with their lives. He also expressed great confidence in their ability to hold the position, saying, 'If you hold for one day, you will inspire the people of Taiwan; if you hold for two days, it will change the attitude of the people on the mainland and the Communist Party toward us; if you hold for three days, you will turn the White House around.' As predicted by the late President Chiang Kai-shek, the United States not only had a great change in its attitude toward our country, but also quickly passed the Sino-American Mutual Defense Treaty in Congress. This was entirely the result of the heroic sacrifice of the Nationalist Army soldiers at the Battle of Yijiangshan. Their contribution to the security of the nation was extremely profound.

== Commemorations ==
- Near the Army Officer's School in Fengshan District, Kaohsiung, there are Shengming Community and Wang Shengming Road.
- The Zhicheng Road in Shilin Zhishan Rock is named after Wang Sheng-ming's courtesy name, "Zhicheng."
