= Dachen Islands =

Group of islands off the coast of Taizhou, Zhejiang, China

Coordinates: 28.46°N 121.90°E

- Interactive map of Dachen Islands

Geography
- Total islands: 29 islands, islets, and rocks, totalling
- Area: 14.6 km^{2} (5.6 sq mi)

Administration
- People's Republic of China
- Province: Zhejiang
- City: Taizhou
- District: Jiaojiang

Demographics
- Languages: Taizhou Wu

Additional information

Chinese name
- Simplified Chinese: 大陈诸岛
- Traditional Chinese: 大陳諸島
Transcriptions
Standard Mandarin
- Hanyu Pinyin: Dàchén Zhū Dǎo
- Wade–Giles: Ta^{4}ch'en^{2} Chu^{1} Tao^{3}

The Dachen Islands, Tachen Islands or Tachens form an island group off the coast of Taizhou, Zhejiang, China, in the East China Sea. They are administered by the Jiaojiang District of Taizhou.

Before the First Taiwan Strait Crisis in 1955, the islands were administered by the Republic of China (ROC). Subsequently, they have been administered by the People's Republic of China.

== History ==
=== ROC evacuation ===
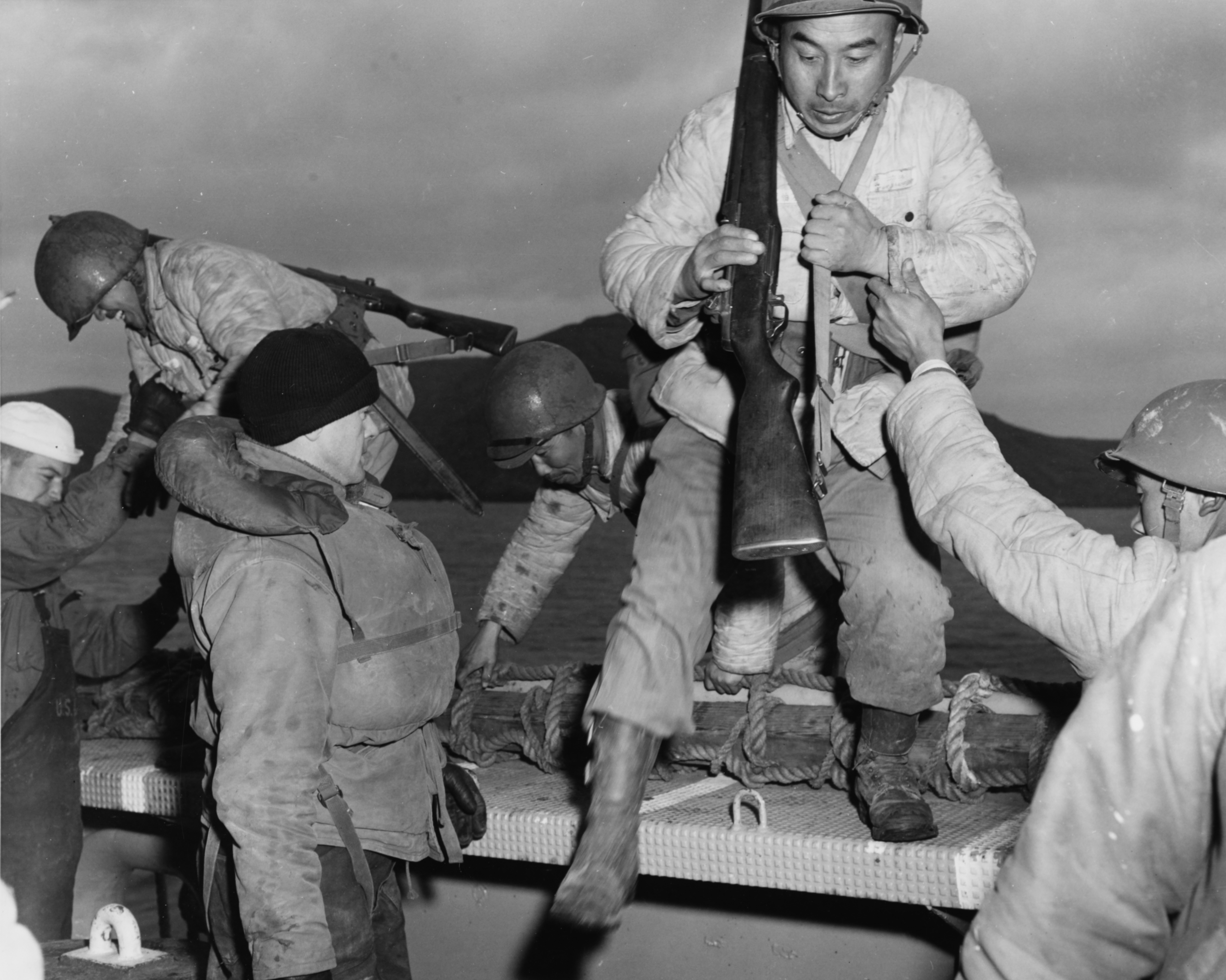
ROC soldiers being evacuated by US forces, 2 March 1955

Until 1955, the Dachen (Tachen) Islands were administered by the Republic of China (ROC), the government of which had been based in Taiwan (200 miles (320 km) south of the Dachen Islands) since major fighting ceased in the Chinese Civil War.

As the People's Liberation Army advanced through Fujian Province in the late 1940s, the U.S.-supported Nationalist forces under Chiang Kai-shek's Kuomintang retreated to China's offshore Islands. On 20 January 1955, the PLA's conquest of Yijiangshan led to the First Taiwan Strait Crisis. The Formosa Resolution of 1955 passed in Congress nine days later in the United States, leading to the orderly evacuation (Operation Pullback) of the Dachen Islands by the United States Navy in February. At the time, they served as the temporary capital of the Chekiang Province in exile. The U.S. Seventh Fleet used 132 boats and 400 aircraft to move 14,500 civilians, 10,000 Republic of China servicemen and 4,000 guerrilla fighters, along with 40,000 tons of military equipment and supplies from the island. Three days after the evacuation, the islands were taken by the People's Liberation Army. Chiang Kai-shek grudgingly allowed the island to fall to the Communists so that the other offshore island groups, Kinmen and Matsu, could be successfully defended.

The civilian population of the islands was resettled in mostly Yilan County, Taiwan, but also in other urban areas in Taiwan.

Many of those evacuated to Taiwan later moved to the United States as they lacked strong social networks and access to opportunities in Taiwan. Chefs from the Dachen Islands had a strong influence on American Chinese cuisine.

== Geography and climate ==
Islands of the Dachen Island Chain.

The islands are located in the Gulf of Taizhou, off the coast of Zhejiang, the People's Republic of China. The archipelago is sandwiched between Zhoushan in the north and the Nanjishan Liedao (南麂山列岛; 'Southern Muntjac Archipelago') in the south, and it is located 52 km (32 mi) from Jiaojiang District, which it administratively belongs to. Dachen Archipelago consists of a total of 29 islands, islets, and rocks, totalling 14.6 square kilometres (5.6 sq mi).

The fishing industry had long been the backbone of the local economy and the region was one of the largest of the Chinese class II fisheries. However, after decades of overfishing, the natural resources were depleted and as a result, most of the local population was forced to migrate to the mainland in the late-1980s and the local populace experienced a drastic decrease to a fraction of what it once was. To compensate for the depletion of natural resources, aquaculture has become prosperous and the archipelago is currently one of the largest aquaculture bases in the region. However, due to the adaptation of advanced technology which significantly reduced the need for manual labour, the local population has not recovered to its peak level despite the income generated has already been higher than that of the traditional fishery peak in the past, and in fact, the current local population was not much higher than the lowest point in the late-1980s.

To diversify the local economy, tourism has become another major source of income. The annual average temperature is 16.7 °C (62.1 °F), and the climate is a typical subtropical climate. The forest coverage rate is greater than 56% and it is the provincial level forest park. Due to the forces of nature such as that of tides and winds, there are many spectacular sceneries and the archipelago is called the Chinese Number One Oceanic Penjing (中国第一海上盆景). Another tourist attraction was the military fortifications left behind by the nationalists during the Chinese Civil War in the post-World War II era because the archipelago was the site of the Battle of Dachen Archipelago in the First Taiwan Strait Crisis.

Climate data for Dachen Islands, elevation 86 m (282 ft), (1991–2020 normals, extremes 1981–present)
Month	Jan	Feb	Mar	Apr	May	Jun	Jul	Aug	Sep	Oct	Nov	Dec	Year
Record high °C (°F)	20.4 (68.7)	23.3 (73.9)	24.4 (75.9)	25.9 (78.6)	30.3 (86.5)	30.7 (87.3)	34.7 (94.5)	35.1 (95.2)	34.1 (93.4)	30.5 (86.9)	26.3 (79.3)	22.8 (73.0)	35.1 (95.2)
Mean daily maximum °C (°F)	9.8 (49.6)	10.4 (50.7)	13.2 (55.8)	17.4 (63.3)	22.0 (71.6)	25.1 (77.2)	28.5 (83.3)	29.4 (84.9)	26.9 (80.4)	22.8 (73.0)	18.2 (64.8)	12.8 (55.0)	19.7 (67.5)
Daily mean °C (°F)	7.6 (45.7)	8.0 (46.4)	10.6 (51.1)	14.8 (58.6)	19.6 (67.3)	23.1 (73.6)	26.5 (79.7)	27.3 (81.1)	24.9 (76.8)	20.8 (69.4)	16.1 (61.0)	10.5 (50.9)	17.5 (63.5)
Mean daily minimum °C (°F)	5.7 (42.3)	6.2 (43.2)	8.6 (47.5)	12.8 (55.0)	17.7 (63.9)	21.6 (70.9)	25.1 (77.2)	25.6 (78.1)	23.3 (73.9)	19.2 (66.6)	14.4 (57.9)	8.6 (47.5)	15.7 (60.3)
Record low °C (°F)	−4.1 (24.6)	−2.3 (27.9)	−1.2 (29.8)	4.9 (40.8)	9.0 (48.2)	13.2 (55.8)	17.5 (63.5)	20.5 (68.9)	16.8 (62.2)	9.9 (49.8)	3.1 (37.6)	−3.3 (26.1)	−4.1 (24.6)
Average precipitation mm (inches)	73.9 (2.91)	76.7 (3.02)	132.5 (5.22)	113.6 (4.47)	134.9 (5.31)	197.9 (7.79)	81.8 (3.22)	154.9 (6.10)	147.3 (5.80)	94 (3.7)	89.6 (3.53)	62.1 (2.44)	1,359.2 (53.51)
Average precipitation days (≥ 0.1 mm)	11.7	12.9	17.2	16.3	15.5	16.0	9.5	11.6	10.7	7.8	11.0	10.2	150.4
Average snowy days	1.1	1.4	0.6	0	0	0	0	0	0	0	0	0.7	3.8
Average relative humidity (%)	78	81	84	86	89	93	92	88	83	77	79	76	84
Mean monthly sunshine hours	112.5	104.8	117.6	130.8	139.9	117.6	235.8	242.5	191.3	188.0	130.0	132.0	1,842.8
Percentage possible sunshine	34	33	32	34	33	28	56	60	52	53	41	41	41
Source: China Meteorological Administration all-time extreme temperature NOAA All-time Oct extremeall-time July highall-time November record

== See also ==
- Yijiangshan Islands (Yikiangshan Islands)
