= Battle of Dachen Archipelago =

Chinese Civil War battle

Coordinates: 28.46°N 121.90°E

- Part of the First Taiwan Strait Crisis
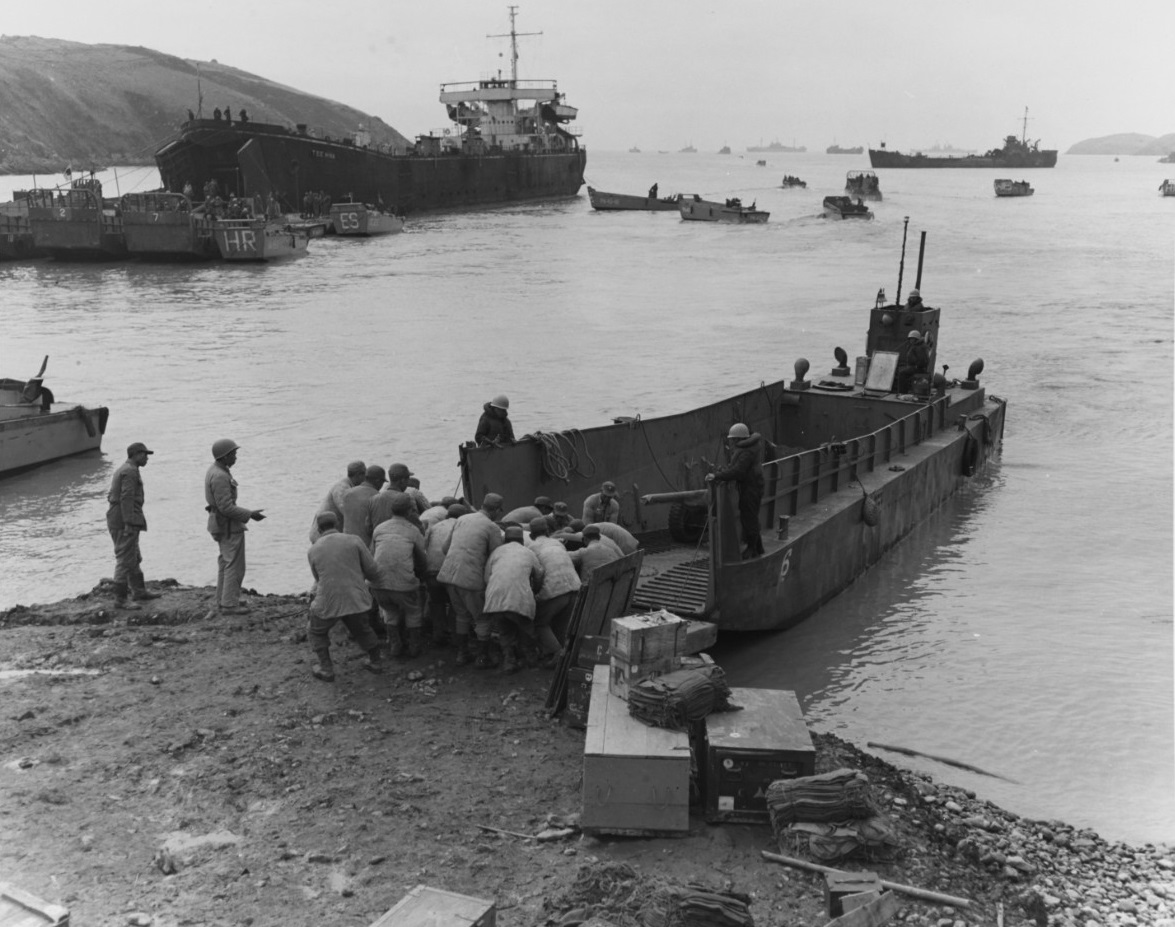
- Nationalist soldiers load artillery aboard an LCM as ships at anchor await their arrival, 6 February 1955
Date	19 January – 26 February 1955 (1 month and 1 week)
Location	Dachen Islands
Result	People's Republic of China victory
Territorial changes	People's Republic of China captures Dachen

Belligerents
Republic of China (Taiwan); Supported by: United States	People's Republic of China

Commanders and leaders
Chiang Ching-kuo; Alfred M. Pride	Zhang Aiping

Strength
15,000	28,000

The Battle of Dachen Archipelago (simplified Chinese: 大陈等岛之战; traditional Chinese: 大陳等島之戰; pinyin: Dàchén Děng Dǎo Zhī Zhàn) was fought between the Republic of China and the People's Republic of China for the control of several archipelagos just off the coast of Zhejiang, China during the First Taiwan Strait Crisis.

As the PLA targeted and heavily bombarded the islands, the Nationalist garrison's infrastructure was destroyed, leaving them unable to adequately defend the archipelago. On 8 February, 1955, the United States Navy commenced Operation King Kong (Chinese: 金剛計劃). The objective of the operation was to withdraw soldiers, civilian inhabitants, and military equipment and supplies from the Dachen Islands, Pishan Island, and Yushan Island south to Taiwan. Following this evacuation, the PLA eventually took the Dachen Archipelago, along with the other two smaller archipelagos from the Nationalists: the Southern Muntjac Archipelago (simplified Chinese: 南麂山列岛; traditional Chinese: 南麂山列島; pinyin: Nán Jǐshān Liè Dǎo) and the Southern Deer Mountain Archipelago (simplified Chinese: 南鹿山列岛; traditional Chinese: 南鹿山列島; pinyin: Nán Lùshān Liè Dǎo).

== Background ==
In 1955, the Communists had already targeted Dachen Archipelago when they attacked the Yijiangshan Islands in Zhejiang province, but the Communists were incapable of simultaneously taking both of them. During the Battle of Yijiangshan Islands, the Communists bombed Dachen archipelago. One of the main reasons was to prevent the Nationalist garrison of Dachen Archipelago from reinforcing the Yijiangshan Islands. In fact, from November 1, 1954, through November 4, 1954, within not more than 4 days, the People's Liberation Army Air Force had flown 49 sorties to bomb Dachen Archipelago, but none of the 721 bombs dropped hit their intended targets. On 10 November 1954, the PLA bombers flew 28 sorties and PLA fighters flew 46 sorties in support of the bombers to strike Nationalist warships in the Dachen Archipelago, but only resulted in minor damage to five warships. The unsuccessful strikes were because the experienced aircrew was busy preparing for the Battle of Yijiangshan Islands and missions against Dachen Archipelago were performed by inexperienced aircrew. However, after experiencing the two rather unsuccessful bombings, the Nationalists mistakenly believed that this was all that the Liberation Army air force was capable of and started to relax. However, they would pay a heavy price later on in 1955, after the end of the Battle of Yijiangshan Islands, when the combat-hardened aircrew with experience struck the Dachen Archipelago again.

== Battle ==
=== Air raids ===
After the main battle of the Battle of Yijiangshan Islands had subsided, the PLA immediately turned their attentions to Dachen Archipelago before declaring the Yijiangshan Islands secured. In fact, it was not a battle as people think, because the Liberation Army was mainly using their air force to keep bombing Dachen Archipelago and the Nationalist army was unable to strike back. Another disadvantage to the Nationalist army was that since the Liberation Army used Nationalist army equipment captured during the Chinese Civil War, they were able to intercept Nationalist communications, since both sides used radios manufactured in the United States. So during the battle, despite the casualties being minimal, the local Nationalist garrison was forced to use unencrypted radios to communicate with Taiwan and among themselves. On 19 January 1955, the first PLA bombing mission specifically targeting Dachen was carried out by combat-hardened aircrew with experience. Due to the previous two unsuccessful PLA bombing missions, the Nationalists believed that this third air raid would be equally inept and were not fully prepared. As a result, the infrastructures on the islands, especially those for communication, were severely damaged. The second wave of attack also occurred on the same day on 19 January 1955. Although the local Nationalist garrison regrouped and set up more effective air defense, the effort was ultimately futile. The reason was that the second wave of attack struck a place completely unexpected by the Nationalist garrison: the reservoir, which was not considered a significant military target by the Nationalists. Through the bombing, the reservoir was completely destroyed and without any fresh water supply readily available, it was nearly impossible to defend the archipelago. On 2 February 1955, the PLA air force bombed the Southern Deer Mountain Archipelago.

=== Evacuation ===
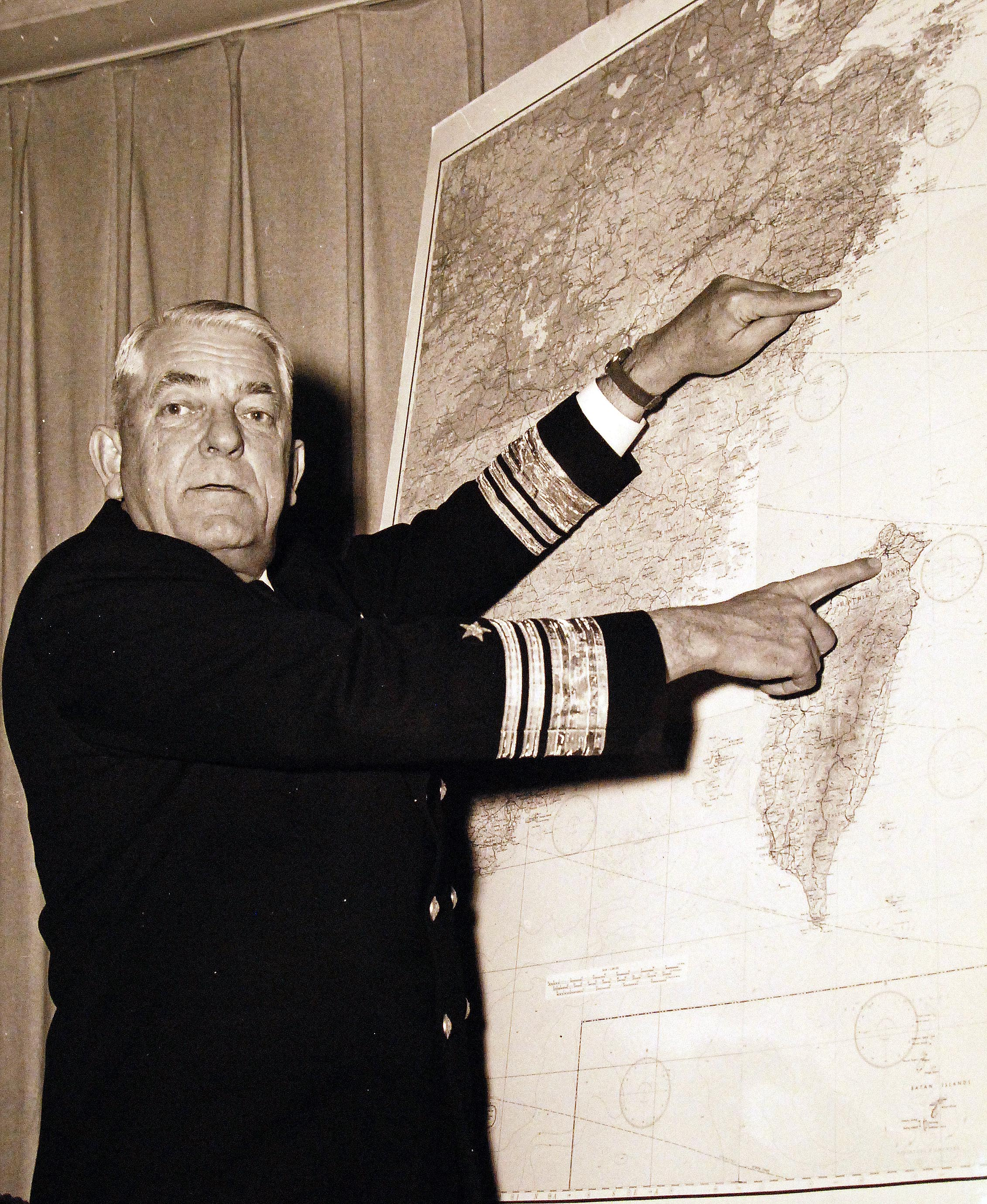
Vice Admiral Robert P. Briscoe, Deputy Chief of Naval Operations, Fleet Operations and Readiness, holding a press conference at the Pentagon on the evacuation of the Dachen Islands, February 2, 1955

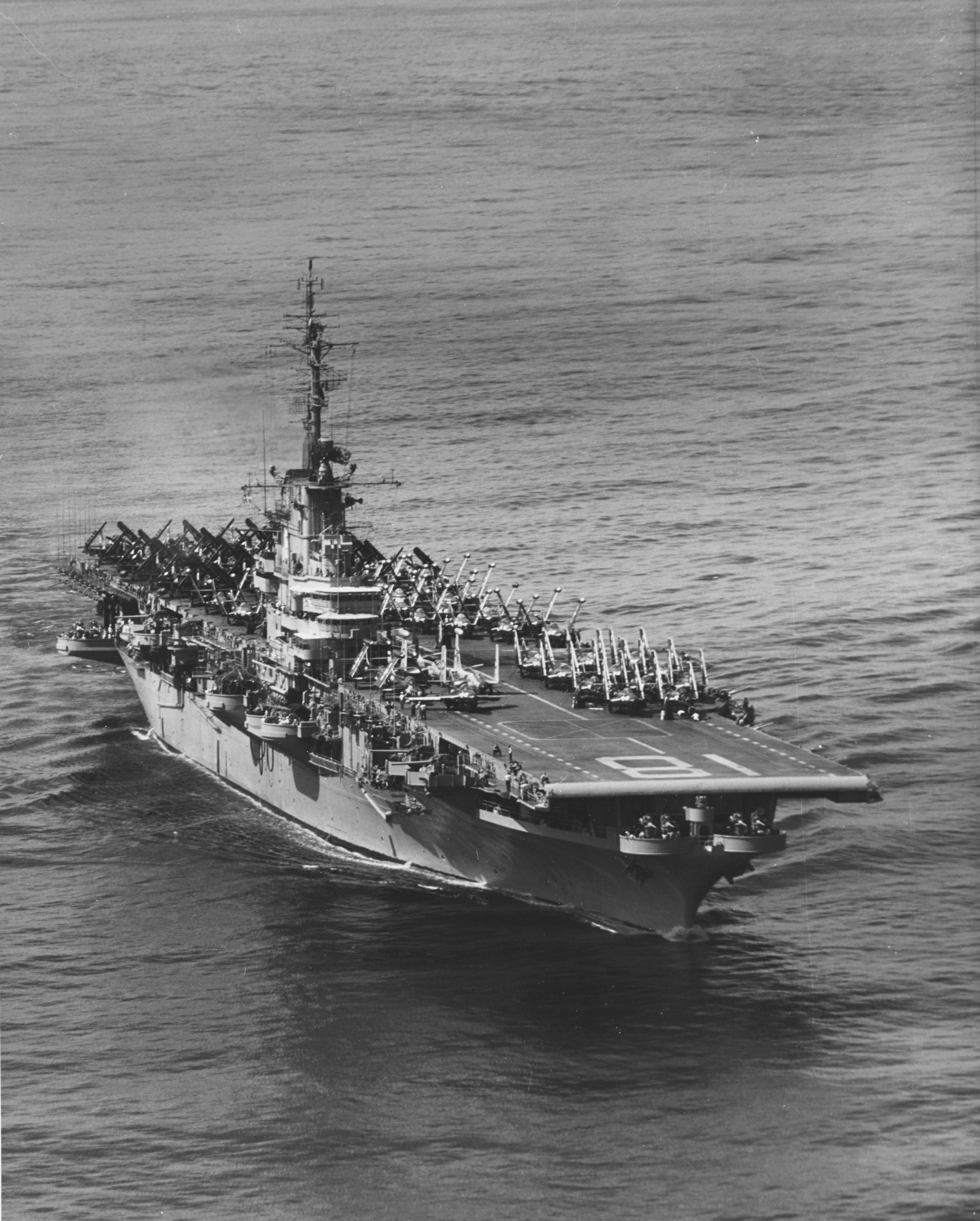
USS Wasp (CVA-18) at sea in the Far East on 5 January 1955. It provided air cover for the operation.

After the battle and bombing in the Dachen Archipelago, the Nationalist government of the Republic of China realized that it was hard to control the Dachen and adjacent archipelagos. They finally agreed with the American government to hold out until an evacuation was carried out by the U.S. Navy in February 1955 to Taiwan, more than 200 miles away to the south, to conserve military strength. The United States Navy used the code name "Operation King Kong" for this retreat.

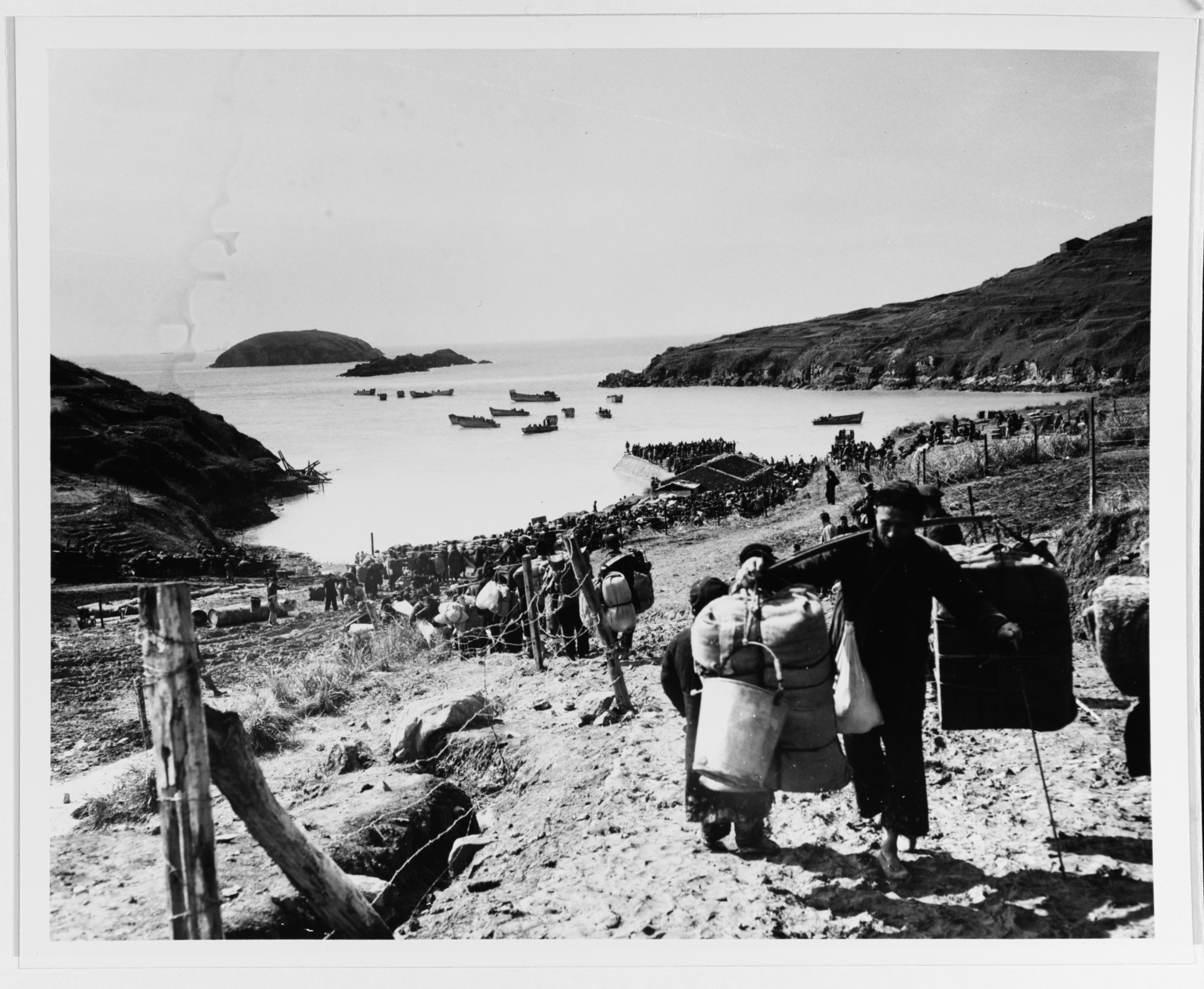
Chinese on the Tachen Islands waiting for evacuation

The main content of the Operation included two military forces, and how to distribute different duties would be very important. In this case, the U.S. Navy and the Nationalist army of the Republic of China were in charge of different areas:

1. The U.S. Seventh Fleet helped to protect the retreat of soldiers, civilian inhabitants and military resources in Dachen archipelago, Pishan Island, Yushan Island.
2. U.S. Navy and Nationalist army cooperated for minesweeping.
3. U.S. Navy and Nationalist army cooperated for air monitor and garrison.
4. Divided operation into 3 plans (plan A, B and C) base on different islands, Plan A and C combine, implemented on February 8 in Dachen archipelago. Plan B implemented on February 9 in Pishan and Yushan islands.

The decision was made to withdraw on 5 February 1955, and the U.S. Seventh Fleet used 132 ships and 400 aircraft to move 14,500 civilians, 10,000 Republic of China servicemen, and 4,000 guerrilla fighters, along with 40,000 tons of military equipment and supplies from the island. After the evacuation, the last flag of the Republic of China in Dachen was lowered by Chiang Ching-kuo, and the Zhejiang province government of the Republic of China was dissolved as Dachen was their last stronghold in the province.

=== Capture ===
After the retreat, Northern Muntjac Island (simplified Chinese: 北麂山岛; traditional Chinese: 北麂山島; pinyin: Běi Jǐshān Dǎo) was the first to be taken by the People's Liberation Army on 8 February 1955, and by 12 February 1955, the entire Dachen Archipelago had fallen into the enemy hands. On 13 February 1955, the entire Southern Muntjac Archipelago was taken by the PLA. The Nationalists had left a single regiment to garrison the Southern Deer Mountain Archipelago to the south of Dachen Archipelago for a symbolic struggle, and the regiment held out until late February 1955. The local commander realized the struggle was futile and was unwilling to waste troops in the lost cause, and thus asked and received permission to withdraw. On 26 February 1955, the People's Liberation Army took the Southern Deer Mountain Archipelago and the battle concluded.

== Outcome ==
For the CCP/CPC, the gaining of these archipelagos eliminated the Nationalist threat to the vital coastal shipping line, and the Nationalist bases to strike coastal regions. However, Kinmen and Matsu were successfully defended.

== See also ==
- Outline of the Chinese Civil War
- Outline of the military history of the People's Republic of China
