= Yijiangshan Islands =

Two islands off the coast of Taizhou, Zhejiang, China

Coordinates: 28.61°N 121.82°E

- Traditional Chinese: 一江山島
- Simplified Chinese: 一江山岛
- Postal: Yikiangshan Islands
Transcriptions
Standard Mandarin
- Hanyu Pinyin: Yījiāngshān Dǎo
- Wade–Giles: I^{1}-chiang^{1}-shan^{1} Tao^{3}

The Yijiangshan Islands are two small islands 13 kilometres (8.1 mi) from the Dachen Islands, located off the coast of Taizhou, Zhejiang, in the East China Sea.

During the First Taiwan Strait crisis the islands were captured in January 1955 by the People's Liberation Army (PLA) from Republic of China (ROC) Nationalist forces in the Battle of Yijiangshan even as the U.S. Seventh Fleet was patrolling nearby.

== See also ==
- Chekiang Province, Republic of China
