= Formosa Resolution of 1955 =

US Senate resolution on Taiwan

- Long title: Joint Resolution to authorize the President of the United States to employ the Armed Forces of the United States for the protecting of the security of Taiwan, the Pescadores, and related positions and territories of that area
- Enacted by: the 84th United States Congress

Citations
- Public law: Pub. L. 84–4
- Statutes at Large: 69 Stat. 7

Legislative history
- Introduced in the House as H.J. Res. 159 by James P. Richards; Committee consideration by House Foreign Affairs; Passed the House on; Passed the Senate on; Signed into law by President Dwight D. Eisenhower on January 29, 1955

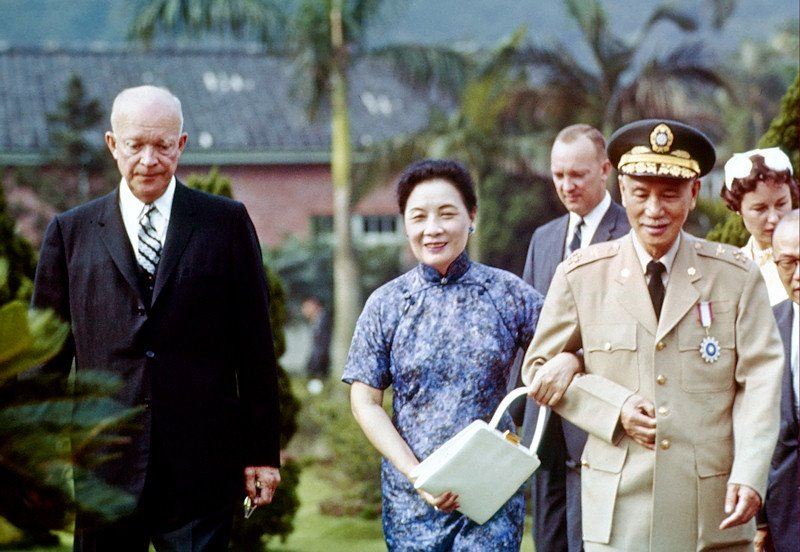
Leader of the Republic of China Chiang Kai-shek and U.S. President Dwight D. Eisenhower in 1960.

The Formosa Resolution of 1955 was a joint resolution passed by the U.S. Senate and signed by U.S. President Dwight D. Eisenhower on January 29, 1955, to counteract the threat of an invasion of Taiwan (Republic of China) by the People's Republic of China (PRC). The resolution gave the U.S. president the authority "to employ the Armed Forces of the United States as he deems necessary for the specific purpose of securing and protecting Formosa [a name formerly used for the island of Taiwan] and the Pescadores against armed attack".

The resolution was formulated amid the Taiwan Strait Crisis (1954–1955), which was a brief period of armed conflict that involved incursions made by the Chinese Communist Party (CCP) on the islands in the Taiwan Strait controlled by the Kuomintang (KMT) led Republic of China (ROC). A latent response by the United Nations Security Council regarding these developments prompted U.S. President Eisenhower to request the resolution in January 1955.

== Background ==
=== Qing China and WWII ===
Formosa and its nearby islands were under Qing rule until the dynasty ceded their sovereignty to Japan in 1895 following its loss to the Japanese in the first Sino-Japanese War. Half a century later, in the midst of WWII, the Cairo Declaration of 1943 established that jurisdiction over the islands would be returned to China should Japan surrender. Following Japan's defeat, the United States, which fought with China as allies and had established diplomatic relations with country through the Treaty of Wanghia, formally acknowledged its right to reclaim all territories (including Formosa) stolen from it by Japan. In a statement of neutrality given by U.S. Secretary of State Dean Acheson in January 1950, the U.S. Government declared it was "not going to get involved militarily in any way on the Island".

=== Deteriorating circumstances ===
In the early 1950s however, peaceful relations between the United States and the People's Republic of China began to deteriorate. In the months succeeding the declaration of neutrality, the PRC seized all U.S. consular property in Beijing, signed the 1950 Treaty of Friendship, Alliance, and Mutual Assistance with the Soviet Union, and began growing its forces at Chekiang and Fukien, opposite Formosa. These developments, along with the outbreak of the Korean War in June 1950, prompted President Eisenhower to order the American navy to position itself in the Taiwan Strait to prevent a possible attack on Formosa by the PRC. The ROC had always been perceived by Western powers as China's only legitimate government and had thus held its seat at the United Nations since the organization's establishment. Following the CCP's victory in the Chinese Civil War, the official establishment of the PRC raised questions of who China's legal representative at the UN should be. The U.S. voted against a seat for the PRC at the UN which further strained relations tensions between the two powers.

By the mid-1950s, the United States launched a trade embargo and began a policy of isolation and containment towards the PRC. Parallel to this, the Eisenhower administration between 1952 and 1954 increased its diplomatic, economic, and military aid to Taiwan, with economic aid valued at US$527 million and military aid at US$940 million. On September 3, 1954, the CCP began a heavy artillery bombing of the Chinese islands of Quemoy and Matsu, a smaller group of islands just off the mainland that ROC officials considered optimal for strategic positioning and reinvasion of the mainland. The PRC additionally held thirteen American prisoners and was threatening their execution, prompting further action by the Eisenhower administration. On December 2, 1954, the Sino-American Mutual Defense Treaty was signed between the U.S. and the ROC, in addition to other mutual security agreements in the Pacific.

== Resolution ==
On January 6, 1955, President Eisenhower submitted to the Senate for its advice and consent to ratify the Mutual Defense Treaty between the U.S. and the ROC, which outlined an armed attack in the West Pacific area directed against Formosa and the Pescadores territories.

When the Chinese Communist Party's forces seized control of Inchaing Island, located 210 miles north of Taiwan in mid-January 1955, calls for U.S. military intervention intensified as the CCP's continued attacks towards Quemoy and Matsu, extending armed skirmishes between the two governments as far as mainland Chinese ports. These developments prompted action from President Eisenhower. On January 24, Eisenhower requested permission from Congress to use military force to defend Taiwan. By the next day, January 25, 1955, the House approved a resolution requested by President Eisenhower that authorized the president to defend Formosa (Taiwan) and the Pescadores Islands by a vote of 410–3 in the House of Representatives. On January 28, 1955, the Senate approved the resolution, 85–3. On the same day the U.S. Senate approved this resolution, the Formosa problem had finally gained the attention of the U.N. Security Council. However, due to the PRC's refusal to join the discussion, the issue was effectively dropped from the agenda of the U.N. Regardless, with the approval of the House and the Senate, President Eisenhower moved forward by signing the Resolution on January 29, 1955. The U.S. officially adopted the Formosa Resolution, a purported mechanism to prevent another crisis in the Taiwan Strait, as was experienced in the First Taiwan Strait Crisis (1954–1955). The Resolution empowered President Eisenhower to fully defend Formosa by granting him the authority to employ U.S. armed forces in the Taiwan Strait. While the Resolution authorized the U.S. president to use force to defend Formosa, it did not explicitly express an overt support for the ROC's government. The Resolution was an attempt to prevent further military conflict between the People's Republic of China and the Republic of China without explicitly siding with Formosa.

== Aftermath ==
=== Immediate aftermath ===
The Joint Resolution did not resolve the Taiwan Strait Crisis, nor did it alleviate the hostility between the PRC and the ROC. Instead, the Resolution broadened the scope of the Mutual Defense Treaty by extending U.S. commitments to defend from PRC incursions of the offshore islands, in addition to Taiwan.

As the crisis continued into early spring, U.S. officials warned publicly of the potential use of nuclear weapons when in March 1955, Secretary of State John Foster Dulles called for stronger U.S. intervention. Tensions were temporarily alleviated in April 1955 when the PRC announced that they were prepared to negotiate on Taiwan and ceased bombardment of Quemoy and Matsu. In May the PRC officially halted its shelling and agreed to a negotiated truce. On September 12, 1955, the Joint Chiefs of Staff consulted President Eisenhower, suggesting nuclear weapons should be used against the PRC if it launched a full-scale invasion of Taiwan. Making certain that Beijing was aware of this, the Eisenhower administration reached a temporary truce with the PRC until the conflict was revived when Taiwan began military reinforcement of the two islands. By May 1957, the United States provided Taiwan with Matador missiles capable of carrying nuclear warheads. When the second Quemoy crisis broke in 1958, which involved another deployment of U.S. air and naval forces, President Eisenhower threatened to use nuclear weapons once again.

=== The 1970s ===
Over a decade after the Second Taiwan Strait Crisis, the U.S. terminated its formal diplomatic relations with the ROC as a condition for the resumption of diplomatic relations with the PRC. Determined to take advantage of the split in relations between the PRC and the Soviet Union and shift the balance of power towards the West, President Richard Nixon pursued a policy of rapproachment with China. This began with his 1972 visit to China and culminated in 1979 with the signing of the Joint Communiqué on the Establishment of Diplomatic Relations by President Carter and Chinese Communist Party leader Deng Xiaoping. In the communiqué, while the U.S. recognized the legitimacy of the People's Republic of China, it only acknowledged its claims over Taiwan. By April, Congress rekindled its relations with Taiwan with the approval of the Taiwan Relations Act, which allowed the continuation of commercial and cultural relations and arms sales between the U.S. and Taiwan. The act restored U.S. relations with Taiwan while maintaining its recognition of the People's Republic of China as the legitimate representative of China.

=== The 1980s ===
In the 1980s, U.S. President Ronald Reagan and his administration issued the "Six Assurances" to Taiwan. The "Six Assurances" included pledges by the U.S. to honor the Taiwan Relations Act, to not intervene in ongoing disputes between Taiwan and China, and to not terminate arms sales to Taiwan.

By August 1982, the Reagan administration signed the third joint communiqué agreement with the PRC's government. The signing of this agreement effectively normalized relations between the U.S. and China, and reiterates the U.S.' allegiance to the One China policy. President Reagan had voiced support for stronger ties with Taiwan, however, due to fears of Soviet expansion in the Cold War era, President Reagan's administration was pressured to strengthen ties with China. As such, by June 1984, President Reagan's administration permitted the sale of U.S. military equipment to Beijing.

=== The 1990s ===
Despite the Third Taiwan Strait Crisis of 1996, which involved Chinese missile tests in the waters near Taiwan, Taiwan held their first free presidential vote in 1996. These missile tests were meant to sway Taiwanese voters to vote against the pro-independence candidates such as incumbent Kuomintang president Lee Teng-hui and the Democratic Progressive Party's Peng Ming-min. Ultimately, Lee won the election by a large margin in March 1996.

=== The 21st century ===
By the 2010s, the U.S. had recognized the PRC's China as the one and only China for decades. However, when Donald Trump won the U.S. presidential election in 2016, Trump broke the U.S. code of conduct towards China when he spoke with Taiwanese President Tsai Ing-wen in a telephone call. This raised questions over the U.S.' commitment to its One China policy. President Trump attempted to alleviate these doubts during a call on February 9, 2017, with General Secretary of the Chinese Communist Party Xi Jinping, in which he restated he would honor the One China policy. Despite honoring this policy, the U.S. still maintains unofficial ties with Taiwan, including the provisions of defense aid.
