= First Taiwan Strait Crisis =

1954–1955 military conflict between the PRC and ROC

First Taiwan Strait Crisis 2nd →
- Part of the cross-strait conflict and Cold War in Asia
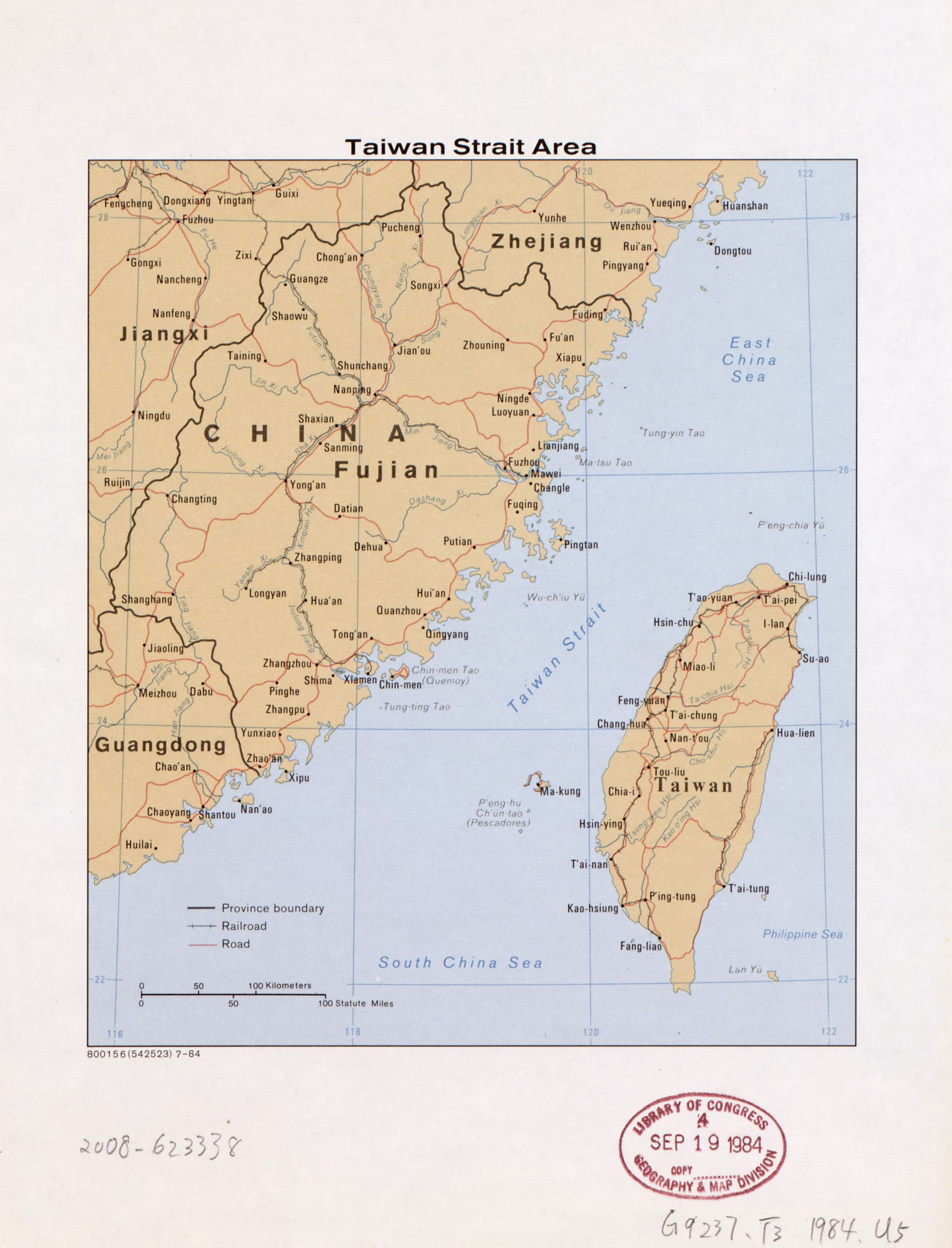
- Map of the Taiwan Strait
Date	3 September 1954 – 1 May 1955 (7 months and 4 weeks)
Location	Fuchien; Chekiang
Result	Inconclusive: United States passes the Formosa Resolution of 1955 and signs the Mutual Defense Treaty with the Republic of China
Territorial changes	People's Republic of China gains full control of Zhejiang by capturing Yijiangshan and Dachen

Belligerents
Republic of China (Taiwan); Supported by: United States	People's Republic of China

Commanders and leaders
Chiang Kai-shek; Liu Yuzhang; Dwight D. Eisenhower	Mao Zedong; Zhou Enlai; Peng Dehuai; Xu Xiangqian

Units involved
Republic of China Armed Forces; United States Armed Forces	People's Liberation Army

Casualties and losses
519 killed; 2 killed	393 killed

The First Taiwan Strait Crisis (also known as the Formosa Crisis, the 1954–1955 Taiwan Strait Crisis, the Offshore Islands Crisis, the Quemoy-Matsu Crisis, and the 1955 Taiwan Strait Crisis) was a brief armed conflict between the People's Republic of China (PRC) and the Republic of China (ROC) focused on several ROC-held islands a few miles from mainland China in the Taiwan Strait.

The crisis began when the PRC initiated heavy bombardment of Kinmen (Quemoy) island in September 1954. Shelling was subsequently extended to the Matsu and Tachen (Dachen) islands. In response, the United States and the ROC agreed to the Sino-American Mutual Defense Treaty in December 1954. In January 1955, the PRC seized the Yijiangshan Islands. Later that month, the Formosa Resolution was approved by both houses of the U.S. Congress, authorizing President Dwight D. Eisenhower to defend the ROC and its possessions. The PRC took control of the Dachen/Tachen Islands and nearby islands in the Battle of Dachen Archipelago, while the U.S. Navy helped ROC troops evacuate.

The crisis de-escalated in April 1955 after Premier Zhou Enlai articulated the PRC's intention to negotiate with the United States at the Bandung Conference, and in May 1955 the People's Liberation Army ceased shelling Kinmen and Matsu. Ambassadorial-level discussions between China and the U.S. began in Geneva in August 1955. The fundamental issues of the conflict remained unresolved, which led to another crisis three years later.

== Background ==
The United States recognized Chiang Kai-shek's Kuomintang government as the sole legitimate government for all of China. On 5 January 1950, United States President Harry S. Truman issued a statement that the United States would not become involved in "the civil conflict in China" and would not provide military aid or advice to the Nationalist forces on Taiwan.

As the Korean War broke out, the United States resumed military aid to the ROC and sent the US Navy's Seventh Fleet into the Taiwan Strait.

On 27 June 1950, Truman issued the following statement:

The attack upon Korea makes it plain beyond all doubt that communism has passed beyond the use of subversion to conquer independent nations and will now use armed invasion and war. It has defied the orders of the Security Council of the United Nations issued to preserve international peace and security. In these circumstances the occupation of Formosa by Communist forces would be a direct threat to the security of the Pacific area and to United States forces performing their lawful and necessary functions in that area. Accordingly, I have ordered the 7th Fleet to prevent any attack on Formosa. As a corollary of this action, I am calling upon the Chinese Government on Formosa to cease all air and sea operations against the mainland. The 7th Fleet will see that this is done. The determination of the future status of Formosa must await the restoration of security in the Pacific, a peace settlement with Japan, or consideration by the United Nations.

— Harry Truman

President Truman later ordered John Foster Dulles, (Note: Dulles would later serve as Secretary of State himself under President Dwight D. Eisenhower.) the Foreign Policy Advisor to U.S. Secretary of State Dean Acheson, to carry out his decision on "neutralizing" Taiwan in drafting the Treaty of San Francisco of 1951 (the peace treaty with Japan), which excluded the participation of both the ROC and the PRC. Each self-claimed legitimate government of China was excluded from the treaty because the question of China's legitimate government remained unresolved after World War II and the Chinese Civil War, and this was considered an intractable sticking point in otherwise comprehensive and multilaterally beneficial peace negotiations.

Japan ceded control of Taiwan in the treaty but did not specify a recipient for Taiwan's sovereignty. This situation has been used by supporters of Taiwan independence to argue for their position that the sovereignty status of Taiwan was undetermined, despite the Japanese having already agreed to return Taiwan to Republic of China through their Instrument of Surrender signed at end of the War. According to the author George H. Kerr, a supporter of Taiwanese independence, in his book Formosa Betrayed, the political status of Taiwan was under the trust of the Allied Powers (against Japan). It would be the responsibility of the United Nations if this could not be resolved in near future as designed in the peace treaty.

The Government of the Republic of China (now based in Taiwan) maintained as its goal the recovery of control of mainland China, and this required a resumption of the military confrontation with the Red Chinese. Truman and his advisors regarded that goal as unrealizable, but regret over losing China to international communism was quite prominent in public opinion at the time, and the Truman Administration was criticized by anticommunists for preventing any attempt by Chiang Kai-shek's forces to liberate mainland China.

Truman, a member of the Democratic Party, did not run for reelection in the presidential election of 1952, even though he was eligible to do so. This election was won by the Republican candidate Dwight D. Eisenhower, a General from World War II.

On 2 February 1953, the new president lifted the Seventh Fleet's blockade in order to fulfill demands by anticommunists to "unleash Chiang Kai-shek" on mainland China, hence the Kuomintang regime strengthened its Closed Port Policy of the aerial and naval blockade on foreign vessels on Chinese coast and the high seas, whereas the privacy activities intensified in the summer 1953 after Joseph Stalin's death and the Korean Armistice Agreement till summed up to 141 interference incidents as per the Royal Navy escort reports.

The CIA briefing on 13 July 1954 for the White House and NSC indicated the shipping insurance increase across the South China Sea after the Tuapse Incident on 23 June, and certain international liners being deterred midway at Singapore, or had to change plans. The PLA Air Force moved in the Hainan Island to clear another transport route through Yulin and Huangpu ports, but accidentally shot down a Douglas DC-4 (VR-HEU) airliner of the Cathay Pacific Airways with 10 deaths on 23 July, then 2 US aircraft carriers, Hornet and Philippine Sea arrived for a rescue mission on 26 July and shot down 2 PLAAF Lavochkin La-11 fighters . On 2 August, Commander of PLA in the Central Military Commission (CMC), Peng Dehuai convened an executive meeting to establish the tactical command on the East China Military Region as per CMC chairman Mao Zedong's directive to open another front from the north.

== Conflict ==
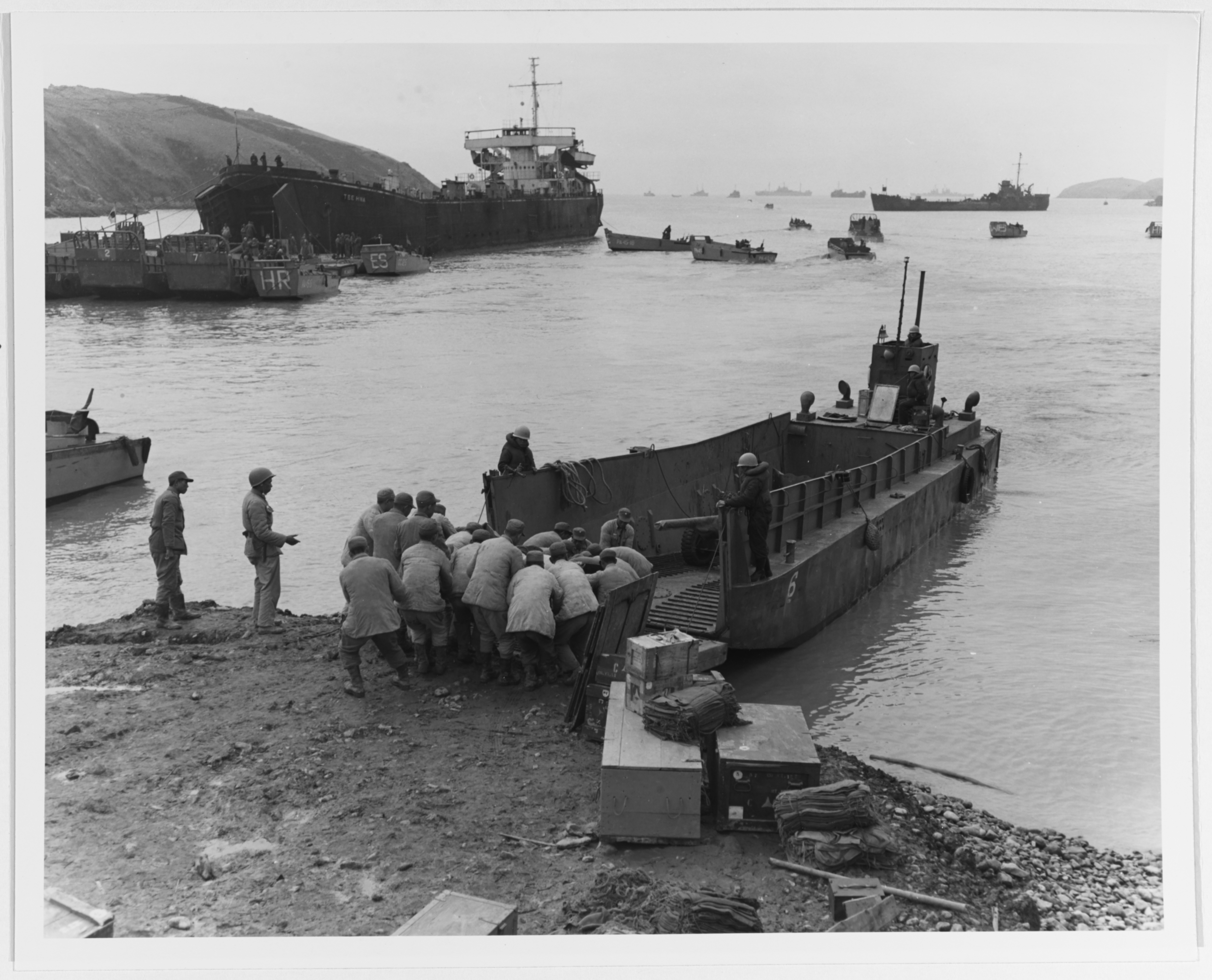
Chinese Nationalist soldiers load artillery aboard an LCM as ships at anchor await their arrival, 6 February 1955.

In August 1954, the Nationalists placed 58,000 troops on Kinmen and 15,000 troops on Matsu. The ROC began building defensive structures and the PRC began shelling ROC installations on Kinmen. Zhou Enlai, PRC premier responded with a declaration on 11 August 1954, that Taiwan must be "liberated". He dispatched the People's Liberation Army (PLA) to the area, and it began shelling both Kinmen and the Matsu Islands.

Despite warnings from the U.S. against any attacks on the Republic of China, five days before the signing of the Manila pact, the PLA unleashed a heavy artillery bombardment of Kinmen on 3 September, during which two American military advisers were killed. Mao Zedong sought to avoid United States involvement in the conflict and gave repeated orders that the PLA should avoid engaging with the American forces off the coast. In November, the PLA bombed the Tachen Islands. This renewed Cold War fears of Communist expansion in Asia at a time when the PRC was not recognized by the United States Department of State. Chiang Kai-shek's government was supported by the United States because the ROC was part of the United States' policy of containment of communism which stretched from a devastated South Korea to an increasingly divided Southeast Asia.

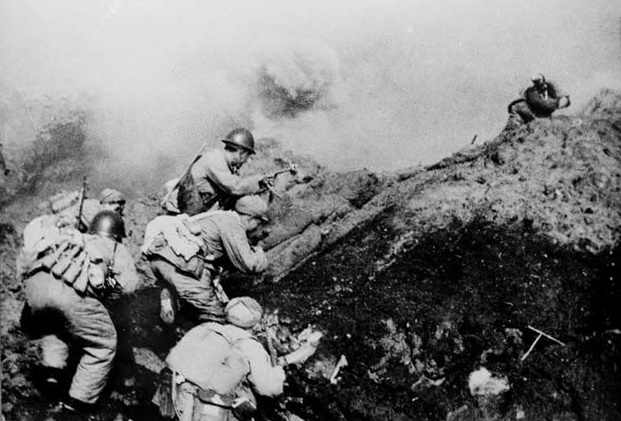
Battle of the Yijiangshan Islands

The PLA initially planned to attack the Yijiangshan Islands in late 1954, but delayed the attack while American forces were conducting military exercises in that area. On 18 January 1955, the PLA seized the islands. Fighting continued on nearby islands off the coast of Zhejiang, as well as around Kinmen and the Matsu Islands in Fujian. On 29 January 1955, the Formosa Resolution was approved by both houses of the U.S. Congress authorizing Eisenhower to use U.S. forces to defend the ROC and its possessions in the Taiwan Strait against armed attack. The U.S. Navy then assisted the Nationalists in evacuating their forces from the Tachen Islands.

During the crisis, Eisenhower threatened to use nuclear weapons against PRC military targets in Fujian. On 12 September 1954, the U.S. Joint Chiefs of Staff recommended the use of nuclear weapons against mainland China. On 2 December 1954, the United States and the ROC agreed to the Sino-American Mutual Defense Treaty, which did not apply to islands along the mainland China. This treaty was ratified by the U.S. Senate on 9 February 1955. In February 1955, British Prime Minister Winston Churchill warned the U.S. against using nuclear weapons, but in March, U.S. Secretary of State John Foster Dulles stated publicly that the U.S. was seriously considering a nuclear strike. On 6 March, Eisenhower also reaffirmed his willingness to use nuclear weapons. In response, the NATO foreign ministers warned at a meeting of the alliance against such action. In late March, U.S. Admiral Robert B. Carney said that Eisenhower is planning "to destroy Red China's military potential."

At the April 1955 Bandung Conference, China articulated its Five Principles of Peaceful Coexistence and Premier Zhou Enlai publicly stated, "[T]he Chinese people do not want to have a war with the United States. The Chinese government is willing to sit down to discuss the question of relaxing tension in the Far East, and especially the question of relaxing tension in the Taiwan area." A month later, Mao likewise told Indonesian Prime Minister Ali Sastroamidjojo that all problems, including the status of Taiwan, could be resolved through negotiation. The crisis de-escalated, and the United States and China began ambassadorial-level discussions in Geneva on 1 August 1955. Two years of negotiations with the United States followed, and covered many issues, although no agreement was reached on the primary issue, Taiwan.

== Aftermath ==
Some scholars hypothesized the PRC backed down in the face of American nuclear brinksmanship and in light of the lack of willingness by the Soviet Union to threaten nuclear retaliation for an attack on the PRC. Others see the case as an example of effective application of extended deterrence by the United States. On 1 May the PLA temporarily ceased shelling Kinmen and Matsu. The fundamental issues of the conflict remained unresolved, however, and both sides subsequently built up their military forces on their respective sides of the Taiwan Strait leading to a new crisis three years later.

Eisenhower's threats to use nuclear weapons during the crisis prompted Mao to begin China's nuclear program. The first of China's nuclear weapons tests took place in 1964 and its first successful hydrogen bomb test occurred in 1967.

== See also ==
- Air India Flight 300
- Capture of the Tuapse
- Guanbi policy
- Nuclear blackmail
