= Yushan Island =

Island in Zhejiang, China

Coordinates: 28°53′03″N 122°16′05″E

Yushan Island (Chinese: 渔山列岛; pinyin: Yúshānlièdǎo) is in Xiangshan County in northeast Zhejiang province, Eastern China. It is the most southeastern island in Xiangshan, located 27 miles from Shipu Town (Chinese: 石浦镇; pinyin: Shípǔzhèn), near Ningbo City. It is situated in the north and south ocean current intersection belt, and is the line basis points of China’s territorial waters. The island's north section is the largest, with a total land area of 2.3 square kilometers.

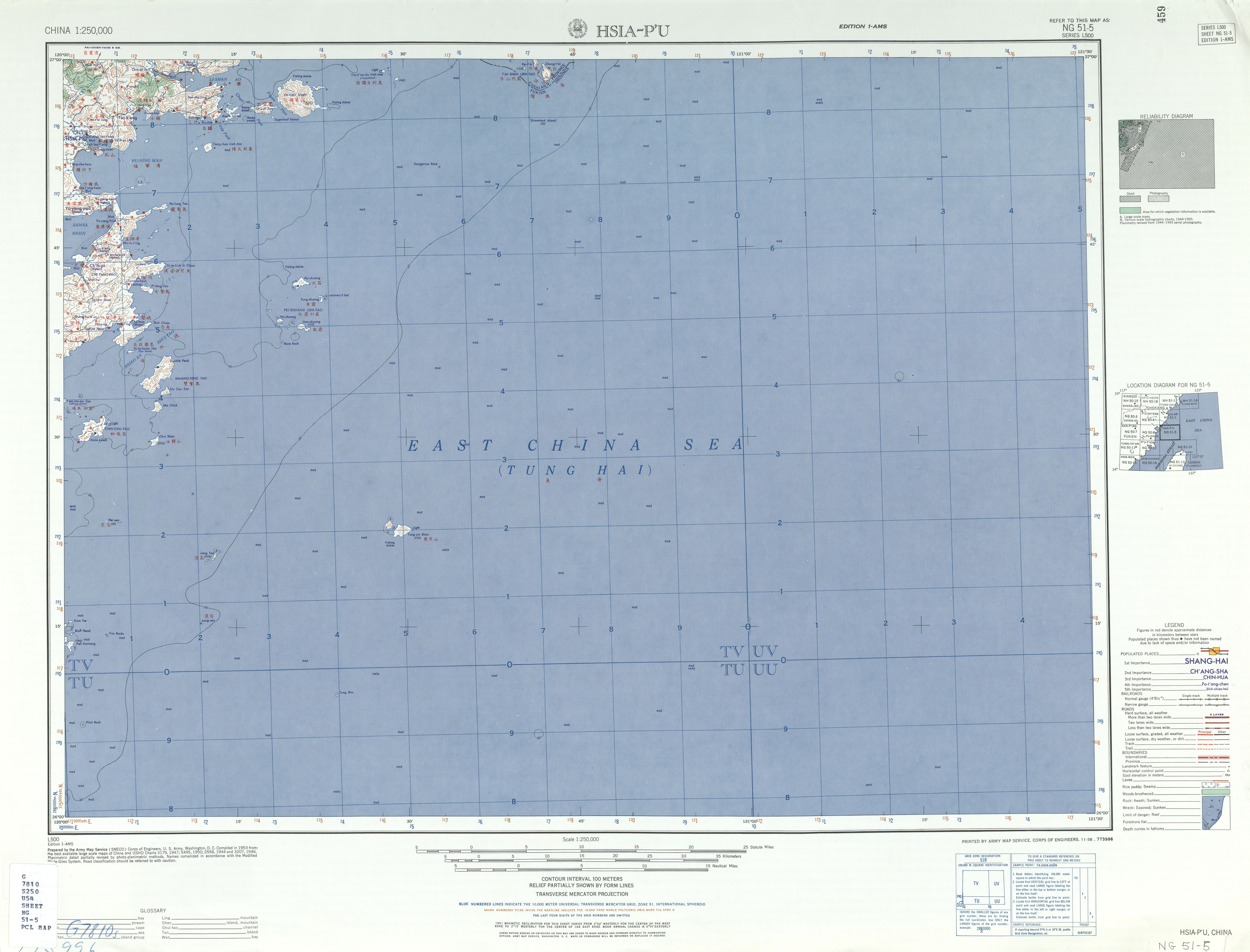
Yushan Island (1953)

There are three sub-islands called North Yushan (Chinese: 北渔山; pinyin: Běiyúshān), South Yushan (Chinese: 南渔山; pinyin: Nányúshān), and the Five Tiger Reef (Chinese: 五虎礁; pinyin: Wǔhǔjiāo).

Yushan Island is known as "the first fishing area in Asia". The island contains unique reefs with crystal-clear seawater, in addition to being rich with fish, shellfish and algae resources — in total more than 300 types.

== Nature ==
In 2008, Yushan Island was registered as a national marine sanctuary to contain rich local marine ecosystem, and was also designated as agricultural grounds to promote natural resources including by artificial reefs. The seawater is so clear that the visibility can exceed 10 meters.

Today, 300 to 400 people reside on Yushan Island due in large part to the number of freshwater resources.
