= List of shipwrecks in March 1886 =

The list of shipwrecks in March 1886 includes ships sunk, foundered, grounded, or otherwise lost during March 1886.

== 1 March ==
List of shipwrecks: 1 March 1886
Ship	State	Description
Barclay	United Kingdom	The ship was driven ashore at Tyrella, County Down. Her crew were rescued by the Tyrella Lifeboat. She was on a voyage from London to Ayr.
Elizabeth	United Kingdom	The ketch was driven ashore at Barry Island, Glamorgan. She was on a voyage from Barnstaple, Devon to Newport, Monmouthshire.
Jean and Marie	France	The brigantine was driven ashore and wrecked at Lydstep Haven, Pembrokeshire, United Kingdom.
Missouri	United Kingdom	The steamship was driven ashore at Holyhead, Anglesey. Her crew survived. She was on a voyage from Boston, Massachusetts, United States to Liverpool, Lancashire. She became a wreck the next day.
St. Audries	United Kingdom	The steamship was driven ashore and wrecked at Lynton, Devon. Her crew were rescued. She was on a voyage from Bilbao, Spain to Cardiff, Glamorgan.

== 2 March ==
List of shipwrecks: 2 March 1886
Ship	State	Description
Celt	United Kingdom	The steamship was driven ashore and wrecked at Boarhills, Fife. Her crew survived. She was on a voyage from London to Leith, Lothian.
Eugenie	United Kingdom	The brig was driven ashore and wrecked south of Craster, Northumberland with the loss of all hands.
Unnamed	United Kingdom	The schooner foundered off Lindisfarne, Northumberland with the loss of all hands.

== 3 March ==
List of shipwrecks: 3 March 1886
Ship	State	Description
Benayo, and Jules Chagot	United Kingdom; France	The steamships collided at Penarth, Glamorgan and were both severely damaged. They were both beached. Benayo was on a voyage from Bilbao, Spain to Cardiff, Glamorgan. Jules Chagot was on a voyage from Penarth to Saint-Nazaire, Ille-et-Vilaine.
Chann	Norway	The schooner was driven ashore and wrecked east of Crail, Fife, United Kingdom with the loss of one of her seven crew.
Maggie	United Kingdom	The brig was abandoned in the Atlantic Ocean. Her crew were rescued. She was on a voyage from Haiti to Boston, Massachusetts, United States.
Marian	United Kingdom	The lugger collided with the smack Acacia (United Kingdom) and sank off the coast of Cornwall with the loss of four of her seven crew. Survivors were rescued by Acacia.
Thames	United Kingdom	The steamship ran aground in the Lye-e-Moon Pass. She was refloated and taken in to Hong Kong.

== 4 March ==
List of shipwrecks: 4 March 1886
Ship	State	Description
Dorothy	United Kingdom	The ketch ran aground at Dundrum.
John Bright	United Kingdom	The Thames barge was run into by the steamship Chimborazo (United Kingdom) and sank in the River Thames at Gravesend, Kent.
The Friends	United Kingdom	The fishing lugger was run into and severely damaged by the steamship William Banks (United Kingdom) 12 nautical miles (22 km) south south west of the Eddystone Lighthouse, Cornwall. She was taken in to Plymouth, Devon.
Troqueer	United Kingdom	The steamship ran aground outside Gaza City, Ottoman Syria, and was wrecked. Her crew survived. She was on a voyage from Jaffa to Gaza City.

== 5 March ==
List of shipwrecks: 5 March 1886
Ship	State	Description
Cam, and Tempo	United Kingdom	The steamship Cam collided with the steamship Tempo and sank in the River Tyne. Cam was on a voyage from Wisbech, Cambridgeshire to the River Tyne. Tempo was severely damaged and was beached. She was on a voyage from the River Tyne to Dublin.
Elstow	United Kingdom	The steamship was wrecked at "Fuentarabia", Spain. Her crew were rescued. She was on a voyage from Bayonne, Basses-Pyrénées, France to Bilbao, Spain.
Parker	United Kingdom	The sloop was run into by the steamship Beresford (United Kingdom) and sank in the River Mersey at Liverpool, Lancashire.
Tasso	Flag unknown	The steamship was wrecked on the Île de Sein, Finistère, France. She was on a voyage from Antwerp, Belgium to Bordeaux, Gironde, France.

== 6 March ==
List of shipwrecks: 6 March 1886
Ship	State	Description
Robert A.	United Kingdom	The barge was damaged by fire at Greenwich, Kent.
Robert and Mary	United Kingdom	The fishing coble foundered in the North Sea 3 nautical miles (5.6 km) off Flamborough Head, Yorkshire with the loss of all three crew.
Xanthippe	United Kingdom	The brig ran aground at Oxwich Point, Glamorgan, and was wrecked. Her crew survived. She was on a voyage from Jamaica to Port Talbot, Glamorgan.

== 7 March ==
List of shipwrecks: 7 March 1886
Ship	State	Description
Queen of Beauty	United Kingdom	The ship departed from Pensacola, Florida for Greenock, Renfrewshire. No further trace, reported missing.

== 8 March ==
List of shipwrecks: 8 March 1886
Ship	State	Description
British Princess	United Kingdom	The steamship was driven ashore in Delaware Bay. Her passengers were taken off.
Garrison, and Ontario	United Kingdom; Canada	The steamship Garrison and the barque Ontario collided in the English Channel off Dover, Kent and were both severely damaged. They both put in to Dover. Garrison was on a voyage from Bilbao, Spain to Middlesbrough, Yorkshire. Ontario was on a voyage from Philadelphia, Pennsylvania, United States to Antwerp, Belgium.

== 9 March ==
List of shipwrecks: 9 March 1886
Ship	State	Description
Maggie L. Carville	(Canada)	The barque was abandoned in the Atlantic Ocean (41°57′N 42°10′W) with the loss of two of her fourteen crew. Survivors were rescued by the steamship Martello (United Kingdom). Maggie L. Carville was on a voyage from Dunkirk, Nord, France to New York, United States.

== 11 March ==
List of shipwrecks: 11 March 1886
Ship	State	Description
Ike Bonham	United States	The steamship suffered a boiler explosion and sank in the Mississippi River at Bedford's Bar, Louisiana, 11 nautical miles (20 km) downstream of Vicksburg, Mississippi with the loss of six lives. All but one of the survivors were injured. The wreck was sold and her new owner had her raised and towed to Paducah, Kentucky, where She was rebuilt and returned to service for the 1886–87 cotton season.
L. A. Palmer	Sweden	The brigantine was abandoned in the Atlantic Ocean with the loss of two of her crew. survivors were rescued by Graf Klof Trauwelter (Germany). L. A. Palmer was on a voyage from New York, United States to Copenhagen, Denmark.

== 12 March ==
List of shipwrecks: 12 March 1886
Ship	State	Description
Alert	United Kingdom	The lugger was run into by the fishing trawler "O.135" (Belgium) and sank in the North Sea 28 nautical miles (52 km) east of Lowestoft, Suffolk. Her ten crew were rescued by the Belgian trawler.
Ellrickdale	United Kingdom	The steamship was wrecked on Europa Point, Gibraltar. At least three of her crew survived.

== 13 March ==
List of shipwrecks: 13 March 1886
Ship	State	Description
Alert	United Kingdom	The lugger was run into by the fishing trawler "O.135" (Belgium) and sank in the North Sea 28 nautical miles (52 km) east of Lowestoft, Suffolk. Her ten crew were rescued by the Belgian vessel.
Berwick Law	United Kingdom	The ship departed from Akyab, Burma for the English Channel. A lifebuoy from the ship was discovered off Mauritius in June.
Fairy Belle	United Kingdom	The barque was driven ashore and severely damaged at Dungeness, Kent. She was on a voyage from Bremerhaven, Germany to New York, United States. She was refloated the next day with assistance from a tug and towed in to Dover, Kent.
John Marker	United States	The steamship was destroyed by a boiler explosion at Boston, Massachusetts with the loss of five lives.

== 14 March ==
List of shipwrecks: 14 March 1886
Ship	State	Description
Charles H. Morse, and Oregon	United States; United Kingdom	Oregon The schooner Charles H. Morse disappeared in the Atlantic Ocean off New York. She was probably the schooner the ocean liner Oregon (United Kingdom) collided with 15 nautical miles (28 km) off New York (41°31′N 71°44′W). The schooner that Oregon hit sank almost immediately with the loss of all hands. Oregon also sank. She was on a voyage from Liverpool, Lancashire to New York. All on board were rescued by the steamship Fulda (Germany), the schooner Fannie A. Graham and the pilot boat Phantom (both United States).
Tasso	United Kingdom	The steamship struck a rock and sank at the mouth of the Bömmel Fjord near "Ryvarden", Norway. All on board were rescued. She was on a voyage from Bergen, Norway to Hull, Yorkshire.

== 15 March ==
List of shipwrecks: 15 March 1886
Ship	State	Description
Beda	United States	The cargo ship sank in the Pacific Ocean 40 miles (64 km) off Cape Perpetua, Oregon . Her eleven crew abandoned ship in two lifeboats. One with her master and five crewmen were never seen again, the other one reached shore on 17 March near the mouth of the Umpqua River with only two of the five crew aboard still alive.
Miriam	United Kingdom	The barge was destroyed by fire at Port Victoria, Kent. Her crew were rescued by the Coastguard.

== 16 March ==
List of shipwrecks: 16 March 1886
Ship	State	Description
Marie Augustine	France	The schooner struck a rock off Guernsey, Channel Islands and sank. Her three crew survived.
Morning Light	United Kingdom	The lighter ran aground and sank off Greenock, Renfrewshire.

== 17 March ==
List of shipwrecks: 17 March 1886
Ship	State	Description
Breconshire	United Kingdom	The steamship grounded on rocks near the Nanpeng Islands, off Shantou, China, and became a wreck, finally breaking up on 25 March.
Cartvale	United Kingdom	The barque was wrecked on the Harbour Rock, off Queenstown, County Cork. Her crew were rescued. She was on a voyage from Samarang, Netherlands East Indies to Glasgow, Renfrewshire.
Sulitjeima	Norway	The ship was discovered in a capsized condition 31 nautical miles (57 km) north east half east of Cape Barfleur, Manche, France. She was towed in to Alderney, Channel Islands by the tug Albert ( (United Kingdom of Great Britain and Ireland) Guernsey).

== 18 March ==
List of shipwrecks: 18 March 1886
Ship	State	Description
Seewoo	United Kingdom	The steamship struck Taizhou Rocks in thick fog and foundered off the shore of Shangta Island, near Zhejiang, China with the loss of seven of the 91 people on board.
Thomas and James	United Kingdom	The ketch foundered north of the Bishop Rock, Cornwall. She was on a voyage from Runcorn, Cheshire to Milford on Sea, Hampshire.

== 19 March ==
List of shipwrecks: 19 March 1886
Ship	State	Description
Gadlys	United Kingdom	The ship departed from "Guayacan" for Liverpool, Lancashire. No further trace, reported overdue.
Girvan	United Kingdom	The ship departed from Akyab, Burma for the English Channel. No further trace, reported overdue.

== 20 March ==
List of shipwrecks: 20 March 1886
Ship	State	Description
Colombia	United States of Colombia	The steamship suffered a boiler explosion off Tumaco. Fifteen people were killed and 22 were wounded.
Enchantress	United States	The steamship was wrecked on the Frying Pan Shoals. She was on a voyage from Baltimore, Maryland to Havana, Cuba.

== 21 March ==
List of shipwrecks: 21 March 1886
Ship	State	Description
Benguela	Norway	The barque was driven ashore at the South Foreland, Kent, United Kingdom. She was on a voyage from Auckland, New Zealand to London, United Kingdom. She was refloated and resumed her voyage in a leaky condition.
Caradoc	United Kingdom	The ship was wrecked near the Smalls Lighthouse, Pembrokeshire. Her seven crew survived.
Cornucopia	United Kingdom	The steamship was driven ashore at Dungeness, Kent. She was refloated.
Lowther	United Kingdom	The ship was abandoned off Bolt Head, Devon. She was subsequently taken in to Salcombe.
Newton	United Kingdom	The steamship ran ashore and was wrecked near Morwenstow, Cornwall. Her crew were rescued. She was on a voyage from Bremerhaven, Germany to Newport, Monmouthshire.
Stannington	United Kingdom	The steamship was driven ashore at Dover, Kent. She was later refloated and towed in to London for drydocking.

== 22 March ==
List of shipwrecks: 22 March 1886
Ship	State	Description
Glenrath	United Kingdom	The steamship ran aground on the Atherfield Ledges, off the Isle of Wight. She was on a voyage from Baltimore, Maryland to London. She was refloated with assistance from the Coastguard and resumed her voyage.
Port Chalmers	United Kingdom	The full-rigged ship was driven ashore at Lowland Point, Cornwall. She was on a voyage from Falmouth, Cornwall to Liverpool, Lancashire. She subsequently broke up.
Sir Bevis	United Kingdom	The ship ran aground on the Atherfield Ledges. She was on a voyage from Newport, Monmouthshire to Southampton, Hampshire. She was refloated and completed her voyage.
Stuart	United Kingdom	The steamship ran aground at Kingstown, County Dublin and sprang a leak.

== 23 March ==
List of shipwrecks: 23 March 1886
Ship	State	Description
General Gordon	United Kingdom	The ketch collided with the barque Galileo S. (United Kingdom) and sank 4 nautical miles (7.4 km) west of Hartland Point, Devon. Her crew were rescued by a barque. General Gordon was on a voyage from Swansea, Glamorgan to Beccles, Suffolk.
Industria	United Kingdom	The smack was run into by the steamship Rio Formosa (United Kingdom) at Bristol, Gloucestershire. She was on a voyage from Sydney, New South Wales to Bristol. She was refloated.

== 25 March ==
List of shipwrecks: 25 March 1886
Ship	State	Description
Devinez	France	The brig was embayed at Penberth Cove, Cornwall, United Kingdom while waiting for a change of wind. She went ashore and was wrecked. Her crew were rescued.

== 26 March ==
List of shipwrecks: 26 March 1886
Ship	State	Description
Nellie	Denmark	The brigantine was wrecked on Jackey's Rock in the Isles of Scilly, United Kingdom (SV 8360 0639). Her captain and mate perished. Two men were taken off the wreck by the pilot cutter Agnes (United Kingdom) and five reached Melledgan on a raft. Nellie was on a voyage from Bordeaux, Gironde, France to Cardiff, Glamorgan, United Kingdom.
Pisino	Austria-Hungary	The barque was abandoned in the Atlantic Ocean. Her crew were rescued by Hedwig (United Kingdom). Pisino was on a voyage from Pensacola, Florida to Genoa, Italy.

== 27 March ==
List of shipwrecks: 27 March 1886
Ship	State	Description
Achilles	Germany	The barque was abandoned off the Isles of Scilly, United Kingdom. She was subsequently discovered by the brigantien Albert René (France), which towed her in to Penarth, Glamorgan, United Kingdom.
Crindau	United Kingdom	The steamship collided with the pier at Garston, Lancashire, driving her anchor through her bow and becoming waterlogged forward. She was on a voyage from Benisaf, Algeria to Garston.
Electric Light	United States	The fishing schooner was run down and sunk by the schooner Annie Lord (United States) off Chesapeake Bay. Her crew were rescued.
HNLMS Java	Royal Netherlands Navy	The corvette collided with the full-rigged ship Loch Broom (United Kingdom) in the Atlantic Ocean 12 nautical miles (22 km) west of the Eddystone Rock, Cornwall, United Kingdom and was severely damaged. Four of her crew got aboard Loch Broom. HNLMS Java was on a voyage from Rotterdam, South Holland to Java, Netherlands East Indies. She put in to Plymouth, Devon, United Kingdom.
Snowflake	United Kingdom	The schooner ran aground on the Brambles, in the Solent. She was on a voyage from Gloucester to Southampton, Hampshire.

== 28 March ==
List of shipwrecks: 28 March 1886
Ship	State	Description
Venetia	United Kingdom	The steamship was driven ashore in Tanable Bay. She was on a voyage from Hong Kong to Yokohama, Japan. She was refloated the next day and resumed her voyage.

== 29 March ==
List of shipwrecks: 29 March 1886
Ship	State	Description
Loch Leven	United Kingdom	The steamship ran aground at Bolsaxen, Denmark and was severely damaged. She was refloated byt consequently sank off Refsnæs. She was refloated in mid-April and towed in to the Kallundborg Forth.
Wuotan	Germany	An explosion occurred on board the steamship at Cardiff, Glamorgan, United Kingdom. Three of her crew were severely wounded.

== 30 March ==
List of shipwrecks: 30 March 1886
Ship	State	Description
Barmore	United States	The steamship suffered a boiler explosion in the Atchafalaya River. Four of her crew were killed and five were severely wounded.
Glenllian Thomas	United Kingdom	The ship collided with the pier at Bilbao, Spain and sank.
Mary Lewis	United States	The steamer was driven into the Lagonda bridge on the Atchafalaya River by a sudden gale of wind and sank with the loss of two of her crew.
Pekela	France	The brigantine sprang a leak and was abandoned 20 nautical miles (37 km) south south west of The Manacles, Cornwall, United Kingdom. Her crew were rescued by the pilot cutter No. 1 (United Kingdom). Pekela was on a voyage from Arcachon, Gironde to Cardiff, Glamorgan, United Kingdom.
William Knox	United Kingdom	The ship was driven ashore and wrecked 4 nautical miles (7.4 km) from Dunbar, Lothian. Her crew were rescued by rocket apparatus. She was on a voyage from Sunderland, County Durham to Brora, Sutherland.

== 31 March ==
List of shipwrecks: 31 March 1886
Ship	State	Description
Abyssinia	United Kingdom	The steamship was wrecked on the Pindar Shoal, 50 nautical miles (93 km) north of Mozambique. All on board were rescued. She was on a voyage from Bombay, India to Mozambique.
"Capitol City"	United States	The ship struck rocks off Rye Beach, New York and sank without loss of life.
Friends	United Kingdom	The dumb barge was run into by the steamship Ethelbert (United Kingdom) and sank in the River Thames at Wapping, Middlesex.
Honest Girl	United Kingdom	The Thames barge sank in the River Medway with the loss of a crew member.
Six unnamed vessels	United Kingdom	The barges sank in the River Medway at Chatham, Kent.

== Unknown date ==
List of shipwrecks: Unknown date in March 1886
Ship	State	Description
Alexandros	Russia	The steamship was driven ashore at "Karabournar".
Alida A. Smith	United States	The ship was driven ashore and wrecked at Hereford. She was on a voyage from Cienfuegos, Cuba to a port in Delaware.
Alseino	Sweden	The ship was abandoned in the Atlantic Ocean before 30 March.
Arctic	United Kingdom	The ship was abandoned off St. Shotts, Newfoundland Colony. She was subsequently taken in to Renews, Newfoundland Colony.
Bele	Flag unknown	The steamship was driven ashore at Hirtshals, Denmark. She was refloated and towed in to Gothenburg, Sweden.
Ceres	United Kingdom	The smack was driven ashore and wrecked at Kimmeridge, Dorset. She was on a voyage from Truro, Cornwall to Poole, Dorset.
C. Hanrahan	United States	The schooner was wrecked on the coast of Puerto Rico.
Corinth	United Kingdom	The steamship collided with HMS Firebrand (Royal Navy) and sank 11 nautical miles (20 km) south of Ockseu Island, Formosa. Her crew were rescued by HMS Firebrand.
Denbighshire Lass	United Kingdom	The ship was driven ashore near Garston, Lancashire.
Dix Frères	France	The brig became waterlogged following the loss of her masts during a hurricane on 14 January, but crew attempted to reach Boston, Massachusetts. On 2 or 7 March one of her crew died and four were taken off by the barque Sarah Anne (Flag unknown), leaving four crew on the wreck. One of the four died on 17 March; the three survivors were rescued on 20 March by the steamship Efficient (United Kingdom). Dix Frères was on a voyage from Martinique to Boston.
Edith	Canada	The schooner was wrecked on Barbados.
Emma Auguste	Germany	The schooner was driven ashore at Thisted, Denmark. She was on a voyage from Sunderland, County Durham, United Kingdom to Rostock.
Etatsraad Hoist	Denmark	The brigantine was driven ashore at Gibraltar. She was later refloated and towed in to Gibraltar.
Europa	Germany	The steamship was driven ashore on Long Island, New York. She was on a voyage from Hamburg to New York. She was refloated in mid-April and taken in to New York.
Fairy	United Kingdom	The smack foundered in the North Sea. Her crew were rescued by another smack.
Flying Fish	Russia	The ship was abandoned in the Atlantic Ocean before 2 March.
Fowey	United Kingdom	The barque was driven ashore 2 nautical miles (3.7 km) west of Selsey Bill, Sussex. She was on a voyage from Beaufort, United States to King's Lynn, Norfolk.
Galdames	United Kingdom	The steamship was wrecked on the Île de Sein, Finistère, France. She was on a voyage from Bilbao, Spain to Cardiff, Glamorgan.
General Picton	United Kingdom	The ship was driven ashore at "Boree", India. She was on a voyage from Newport, Monmouthshire to Calcutta, India. She was later refloated and towed in to Calcutta by the tug Retreiver (India), arriving on 17 March.
Helmich	Norway	The brig capsized at Cardiff.
Hesperia	Germany	The steamship collided with HMS Jumna (Royal Navy) in the Suez Canal. She was taken in to Suez, Egypt for repairs.
Holmbrook	United Kingdom	The steamship was driven ashore at Saltfleet, Lincolnshire. She was on a voyage from Fécamp, Seine-Inférieure, France to Goole, Yorkshire.
Is	United Kingdom	The schooner was wrecked on the Longscar Rocks, off the coast of County Durham with the loss of all hands.
Japanese	United Kingdom	The steamship was driven ashore in the Ladrone Islands. She was on a voyage from Saigon, French Indo-China to Hong Kong. She was refloated and completed her voyage in a leaky condition.
Karin	Sweden	The barque was driven ashore and wrecked on Skagen, Denmark. She was on a voyage from St. Ubes, Portugal to Norrköping.
Mathilde B.	Italy	The brigantine collided with the steamship Elk (United Kingdom) at Livorno and was severely damaged.
Mentor	France	The barque was abandoned in the Atlantic Ocean before 13 March.
Modena	United Kingdom	The steamship was driven ashore on the Swedish coast. She was a total loss.
Monte Bello	Italy	The brig collided with the jetty and sank at Bastia, Corsica, France. Her crew were rescued. She was on a voyage from Porto d'Anzo to Phillipeville, Algeria.
Ogwen	United Kingdom	The ship was driven ashore at Mulki, India. She was on a voyage from Cardiff to Bombay, India.
Osbourne	United Kingdom	The barquentine was driven ashore and wrecked at Ross, Northumberland.
Otto MacCombie	United Kingdom	The steamship was driven ashore near Whitby, Yorkshire. She was on a voyage from Amble, Northumberland to Rochester, Kent. She was refloated and put in to West Hartlepool, County Durham in a leaky condition.
Owain Tudor	United Kingdom	The ship ran aground at Newry, County Antrim. She was on a voyage from Liverpool, Lancashire to Newry.
Patria	United Kingdom	The barque was driven ashore and wrecked at Limberry Point, Devon. All on board were rescued. She was on a voyage from Ship Island, Newfoundland Colony to Rotterdam, South Holland, Netherlands.
Penarth	United Kingdom	The ship was driven ashore at Odesa, Russia.
Polynesia	Germany	The full-rigged ship ran aground at Schulau. She was on a voyage from Iquique, Peru to Hamburg.
Professor Daa	Norway	The brig was driven ashore on the Swedish coast. She was on a voyage from Middlesbrough, Yorkshire to Varberg, Sweden.
Resolute	Canada	The steamship was wrecked on the Ireland Rocks, off Fogo Island, Newfoundland Colony. Her crew were rescued.
Scottish Chief	United Kingdom	The barque was driven ashore and wrecked at Puerto Cortés, Honduras. Her crew were rescued.
Storm Queen	United Kingdom	The steamship was driven ashore near Perim, Aden Governorate. She was on a voyage from Kurrachee, India to Liverpool. She was refloated and resumed her voyage.
Tasso	United Kingdom	The steamship struck a rock and sank near "Ryvarden", Norway. He passengers were rescued.
Temis	Flag unknown	The ship ran aground on the Kalkgrunden, in the Baltic Sea. She was on a voyage from Bergen, Norway to Stettin, Germany.
Tern	United Kingdom	The schooner was driven ashore at Little Haven, Pembrokeshire. Her crew were rescued. She was on a voyage from Shoreham-by-Sea, Sussex to Dublin.
Terner	Norway	The brig was driven ashore at Swansea, Glamorgan. Her crew were rescued. She was on a voyage from Poole, Dorset to Llanelly, Glamorgan.
Tonawanda	United States	The full-rigged ship was driven ashore at Ocean City, Maryland. She was on a voyage from London, United Kingdom to Philadelphia, Pennsylvania. She was refloated.
Tordenskjold	Denmark	The barque was driven ashore on the Swedish coast. She was on a voyage from Newcastle upon Tyne, Northumberland to Rønne. She was refloated.
Tsernagora	Flag unknown	The ship was driven ashore at Spring Lake, New Jersey, United States. She was on a voyage from Havre de Grâce, Seine-Inférieure, France to New York. She subsequently became a wreck.
Washington City	United Kingdom	The steamship was driven ashore in Chesapeake Bay. She was on a voyage from Benisaf, Algeria to Baltimore, Maryland.
Unnamed	Flag unknown	The ship capsized about 6 1/2 nautical miles (12.0 km) south by east of the Bishop Rock, Cornwall, United Kingdom on or before 23 March.
Unnamed	France	The fishing boat was run down and sunk in the English Channel by the steamship Hardwick (United Kingdom) with the loss of nine of her ten crew. The survivor was rescued by another fishing boat.
Unnamed	France	The chasse-marée was run into by the steamship Comte de Hainault (Belgium) and sank.
Unnamed	Flag unknown	The smack was driven ashore in Blackfarland Bay.
