= USS Gregory (DD-802) =

Fletcher-class destroyer

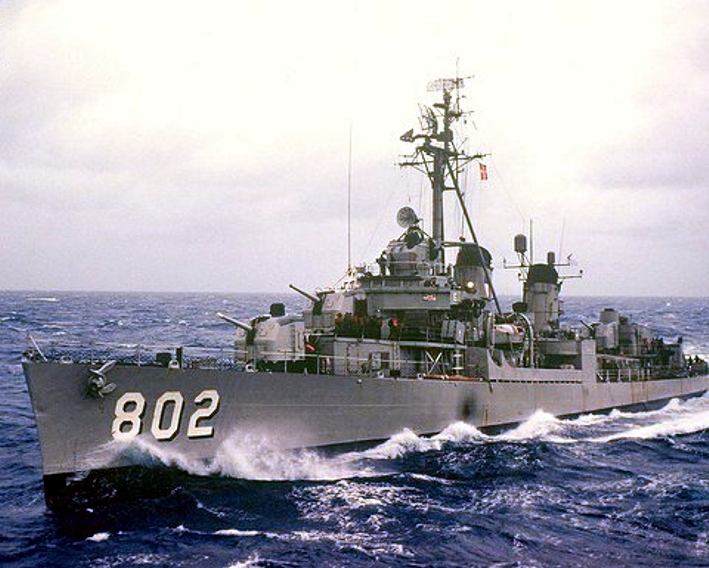

History

United States
- Namesake: Francis H. Gregory
- Builder: Todd Pacific Shipyards, Seattle
- Laid down: 31 August 1943
- Launched: 8 May 1944
- Commissioned: 29 July 1944
- Decommissioned: 1 February 1964
- Stricken: 1 May 1966
- Fate: Run aground for use as target, 4 March 1971

General characteristics
- Class & type: Fletcher-class destroyer
- Displacement: 2,050 tons
- Length: 376 ft 6 in (114.7 m)
- Beam: 39 ft in (12.1 m)
- Draft: 17 ft 9 in (5.4 m)
- Propulsion: 60,000 shp (45 MW); geared turbines; 2 propellers
- Speed: 38 knots (70 km/h; 44 mph)
- Range: 6,500 nautical miles at 15 kt; (12,000 km at 30 km/h)
- Complement: 329
- Armament: 5 × 5 in (130 mm)/38 guns, 10 × 40 mm AA guns, 7 × 20 mm AA guns, 10 × 21 inch (533 mm) torpedo tubes, 6 × depth charge projectors, 2 × depth charge tracks

USS Gregory (DD-802) was a Fletcher-class destroyer of the United States Navy, the second Navy ship named for Rear Admiral Francis H. Gregory (1780–1866), who served from the War of 1812 to the Civil War.

Gregory was launched by the Todd-Pacific Ship Building Co., Tacoma, Washington, 8 May 1944; sponsored by Miss Ann McGuigan, daughter of Captain McGuigan, superintendent of construction at Tacoma; and commissioned 29 July 1944, Commander Bruce McCandless commanding.

== 1944 – 1947 ==
After shakedown along the West Coast, Gregory sailed for the Pacific with Hull (DD-802), reaching Pearl Harbor on 23 October 1944. Two months of local operations terminated in January 1945 as Gregory began practice for the impending invasion of Iwo Jima, next-to-last great campaign of the long and bloody Pacific War. Gregory sailed for the island 22 January, arriving off Iwo Jima via Saipan and Eniwetok on D-day, 19 February. For the next month she remained off the rocky coast under almost constant fire to screen transports and provide fire support for the invasion forces. Departing Iwo Jima 15 March, Gregory reached Saipan 4 days later to prepare for her role in the Okinawa campaign.

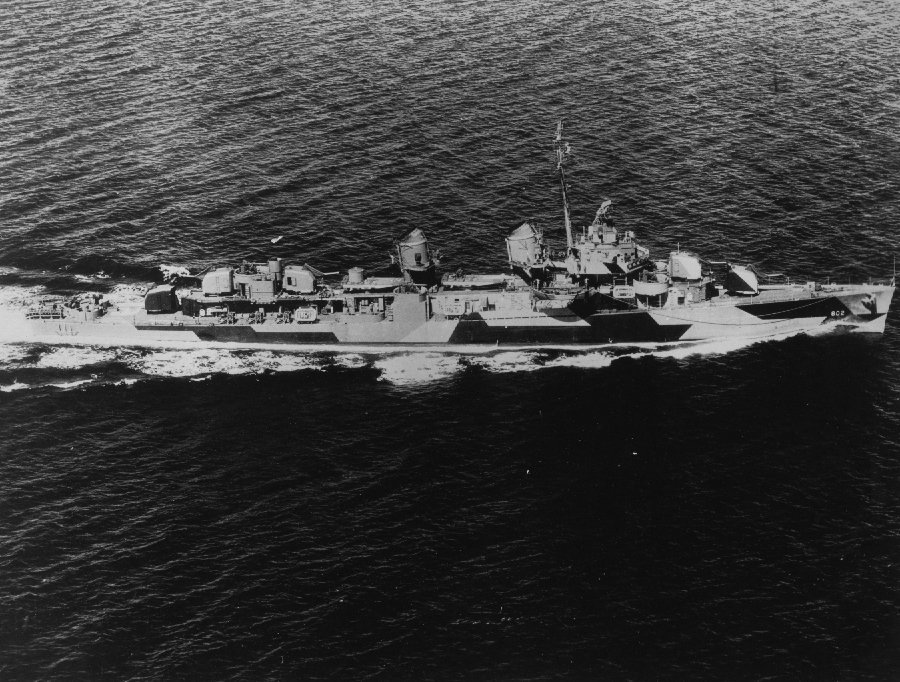
USS Gregory in 1944.

Okinawa, last step prior to invasion of the Japanese home islands themselves, involved over a thousand ships and half a million men, under Admiral Raymond A. Spruance, in the Pacific's war largest amphibious effort. Gregory joined this modern armada as it sailed from Saipan 27 March and was off Okinawa 1 April 1945 as the first waves of Marines waded ashore to bloody battle. Her task group, under Admiral Jerauld Wright, conducted a "demonstration landing" on the southeast coast, hoping to distract some Japanese attention from the actual invasion along Okinawa's western coast. This diversion complete, Gregory remained off Okinawa on patrol and radar picket station.

On the afternoon of 8 April, Gregory’s lookouts spotted three Japanese planes coming in out of the setting sun, a favorite kamikaze device. One of the suicide craft, pieces of fuselage spinning wildly off as Gregory’s guns registered hit after hit, crashed into the destroyer amidships just above the waterline to port. Gregory shuddered under the impact and began to slow in the water as power failed in her forward engine and fire rooms flooded. The two other kamikazes mercilessly pressed on their attack, but the wounded DD downed both of them in blazing gunfire. Gregory then steamed to the anchorage at Kerama Retto for temporary repairs, and on 19 April departed Okinawa. After escorting the aircraft carrier Intrepid (CV-11) to Pearl Harbor, she sailed for San Diego, reaching there 18 May for battle repairs. While Gregory was still in overhaul, the Japanese surrendered and the destroyer was placed in inactive status, in commission in reserve, at San Diego. She decommissioned 15 January 1947.

== 1951 – 1964 ==
Gregory’s rest was to be brief, as Communist forces launched their war in Korea 24 June 1950 and the U.S. Navy joined United Nations forces; she recommissioned 27 April 1951. Reaching Yokosuka, Japan, via Pearl Harbor and Midway 16 August 1951, Gregory immediately began patrol duty along the Korean coast. Her principal duties were screening American carriers, such as Essex (CV-9) and Boxer (CV-21), from which air strikes against North Korean positions and supply lines were launched; blockading the coast, and participating in coastal bombardment as the tide of war ebbed and flowed along the Korean peninsula. In addition, she was frequently assigned to the Formosa patrol, intended to prevent Communist action against the beleaguered republic. Here Gregory came under fire from mainland Communist Chinese shore batteries. While on a search-and-rescue (SAR) mission for a downed P2V 19 January 1953, she closed to within 8,000 yards of Nan-ao Tao, an island just off the China coast that had fallen to the Communists on 3 March 1950 in the Battle of Nan'ao Island. Though shore batteries opened fire on her. Gregory did not return fire, instead clearing the area immediately to continue her SAR mission.

After the Korean Armistice ended the shooting war in August 1953, Gregory returned to a peacetime routine of local operations out of San Diego interspersed with yearly deployments, usually 6 months long, to the Far East. These deployments took her to Yokosuka, Sasebo, Hong Kong, Bangkok, Sydney, Okinawa, the Philippines, and Formosa for training maneuvers with American and other warships. In the fall of 1958 Gregory spent a tension-filled 2½ months off the China coast during one of the periodic intensification of the Quemoy-Matsu crisis.

Gregory earned the Battle Efficiency "E" three times during her post-war career — 1955, 1956, and 1959. Gregory was decommissioned at San Diego, Calif. on 1 February 1964 and entered the reserve. She was struck from the Navy List 1 May 1966, renamed Indoctrinator, and served as an inoperable trainer at San Diego from 20 May 1966 to 8 January 1971. The ship was grounded on San Clemente Island, Southern California on 4 March 1971 to serve as a target.

== Awards ==
- China Service Medal
- Asiatic-Pacific Campaign Medal with two battle stars
- World War II Victory Medal
- National Defense Service Medal(2nd)
- Korean Service Medal with four battle stars
- Armed Forces Expeditionary Medal (Quemoy-Matsu)
- United Nations Korea Medal
