= Battle of Nanpeng Archipelago =

1952 battle

- Part of the Chinese Civil War
Date	20 September – 20 October 1952 (1 month)
Location	Nanpeng Archipelago
Result	People's Republic of China victory

Belligerents
Republic of China (Taiwan)	People's Republic of China

Commanders and leaders
Huang Songsheng †	Liu Cunzhi; Zhang Wannian

Strength
150+ soldiers	~400 soldiers

Casualties and losses
106 killed; 40+ captured	89 killed; 300+ wounded

The Battle of Nanpeng Archipelago was fought between the Chinese nationalists and the communists over the islands of the Nanpeng Archipelago off the Cantonese coast. The Nanpeng Archipelago is a small island chain in Nan'ao County off the coast of Shantou, and is named after the largest island, Nanpeng island (Nánpēng Dǎo, 南澎岛), home to a fishing community of more than 400 people. The archipelago was deemed not important for most of the Chinese Civil War and the nationalists therefore did not deploy any troops on the island, and when Guangdong fell into the communist hands, the archipelago also fell. The communists believed the same thing the nationalists had believed and did not deploy any troops to the archipelago either after the nationalists withdrew, but small patrol teams of 2 to 3 were regularly sent to many of the islands.

== First stage ==
As the nationalists launched their insurgent strikes against the communists, the nationalist strategists believed that archipelago may serve as a steppingstone to launch assaults against the mainland and decided to take the archipelago. On September 20, 1952, over 150 nationalist strike force members riding in four large speedboats launched a surprise attack on Nanpeng island. The token communist force patrolling the island consisted of only three members: a deputy naval infantry platoon commander with last name Zhang (张), who was the patrol team leader, a sailor named Qiu An (邱安), and a militiaman named Lin Xiaofa (林小发). After a futile resistance, all three were killed by the overwhelming enemy force.

== Second stage ==
The communists would not let the nationalists have the opportunity to set up a forward base at their doorstep and immediately began to plan a counterattack. However, due to the urgent defense needs from other parts of the vast coastal regions, the job of retaking the archipelago was given to the ground force, and a strengthened battalion of the communist 41st Army was assigned the mission. However, it was soon discovered that the unit was ill-prepared for an amphibious landing and as a result, the schedule had to be pushed back to first allow more than 20 days of training to be completed.

== Third stage ==
With training complete, the communist battalion rode in junks and departed on October 19, 1952 at 5:00 pm. At 10:00 pm, the communist force landed successfully on Nanpeng island and after two hours of fierce battle, the nationalist resistance on the island ceased and the survivors attempted to hide. The mop up operation and skirmishes on other islands completely stopped the next day at 4:00 am, with the archipelago firmly back in the hands of the communists. The communists managed to kill 79 enemy troops on Nanpeng island, including the nationalist commander, major general Huang Songsheng (黄颂声), and his deputy commander, also a major general. 37 nationalist troops were captured alive on Nanpeng island, and the highest ranking nationalist prisoner of war was the director of the political directorate, Major Gao Xueqian (高学谦). Another 27 nationalist troops were killed and more than a dozen captured alive from other islands and islets of the archipelago. The communists suffered 86 fatalities and more than 300 wounded, almost all soldiers in the battalion reported as casualties.

== Outcome ==
The nationalist defeat proved that it was impractical to establish forward base at the enemy's doorstep while the base is far away from the nationalist strongholds, because it was impossible to reinforce the distant base in time during combat. The communists, on the other hand, had paid a heavy price in their attempt to retake the archipelago because they had gravely underestimated the enemy and although the mission was a success, it was a very costly victory, resulting in almost every task force member becoming a casualty. The communists had numerical superiority but infantry armed only with rifles, light machine guns and hand grenades had a very difficult time in exterminating the numerically inferior enemy that was much better armed with superior weaponry.

The loss of Nanpeng left Jinmen as the southernmost Nationalist outpost and broke the blockade on Shantou.

== See also ==
- Outline of the Chinese Civil War
- Outline of the military history of the People's Republic of China
- Battle of Nan'ao Island
