= USS Gregory =

Two ships in the United States Navy have been named USS Gregory for Francis Gregory.

- The first USS Gregory (DD-82) was a Wickes-class destroyer, serving from 1918 until she was sunk in battle in 1942.
- The second USS Gregory (DD-802) was a Fletcher-class destroyer, serving from 1944 to 1964 and then became Indoctrinator, an inoperable trainer. She was sunk off California as a target in March 1971.
