= HNLMS Java =

HNLMS Java (Dutch: Hr.Ms. or Zr.Ms. Java) may refer to following ships of the Royal Netherlands Navy:

- HNLMS Java (1885), a small unprotected cruiser
- HNLMS Java (1921), a Java-class cruiser
