= Taiwan Bank =

Geographical feature in the Taiwan Strait

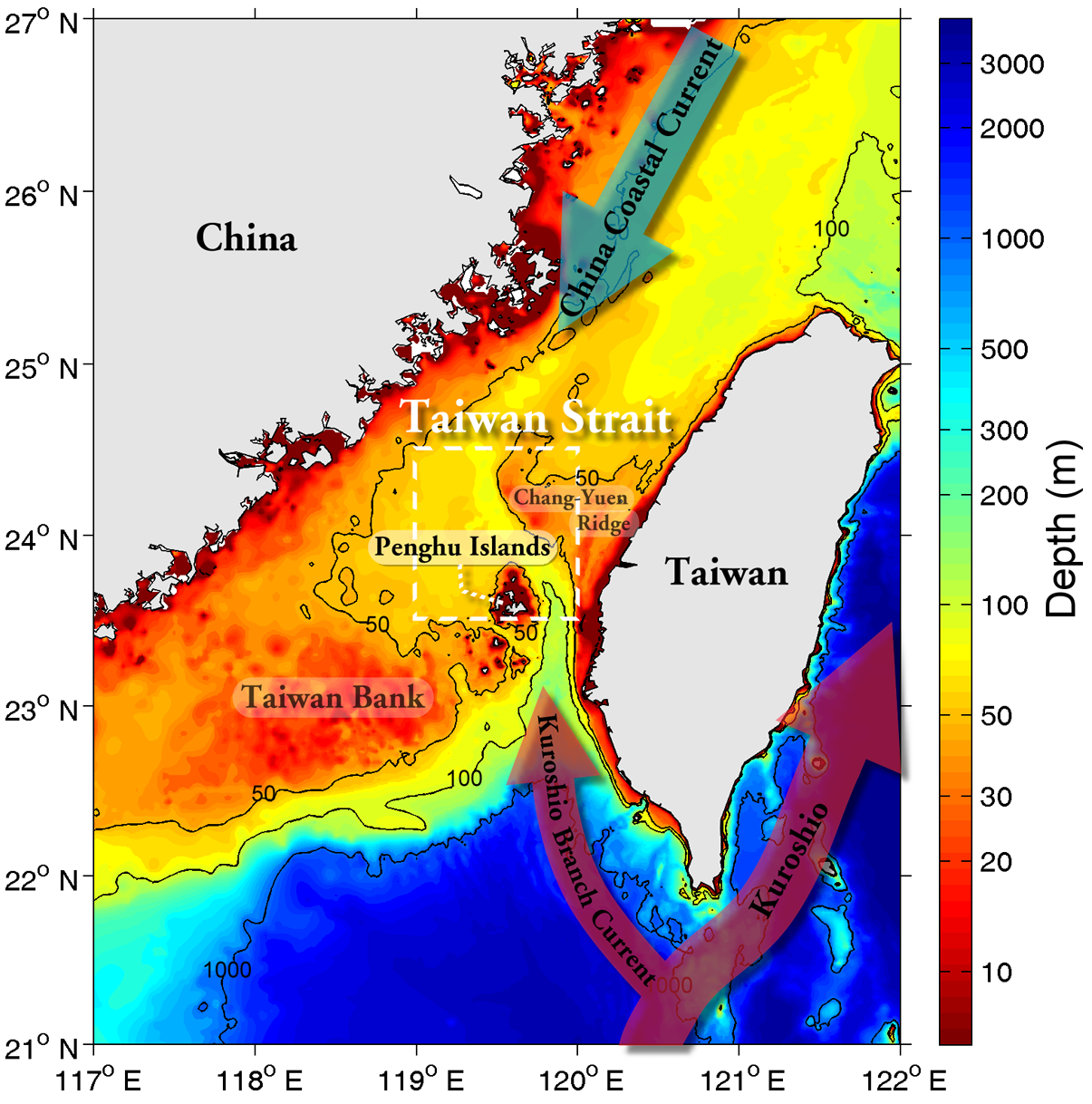
Bathymetric map of the Taiwan Strait; Taiwan Bank is labeled.

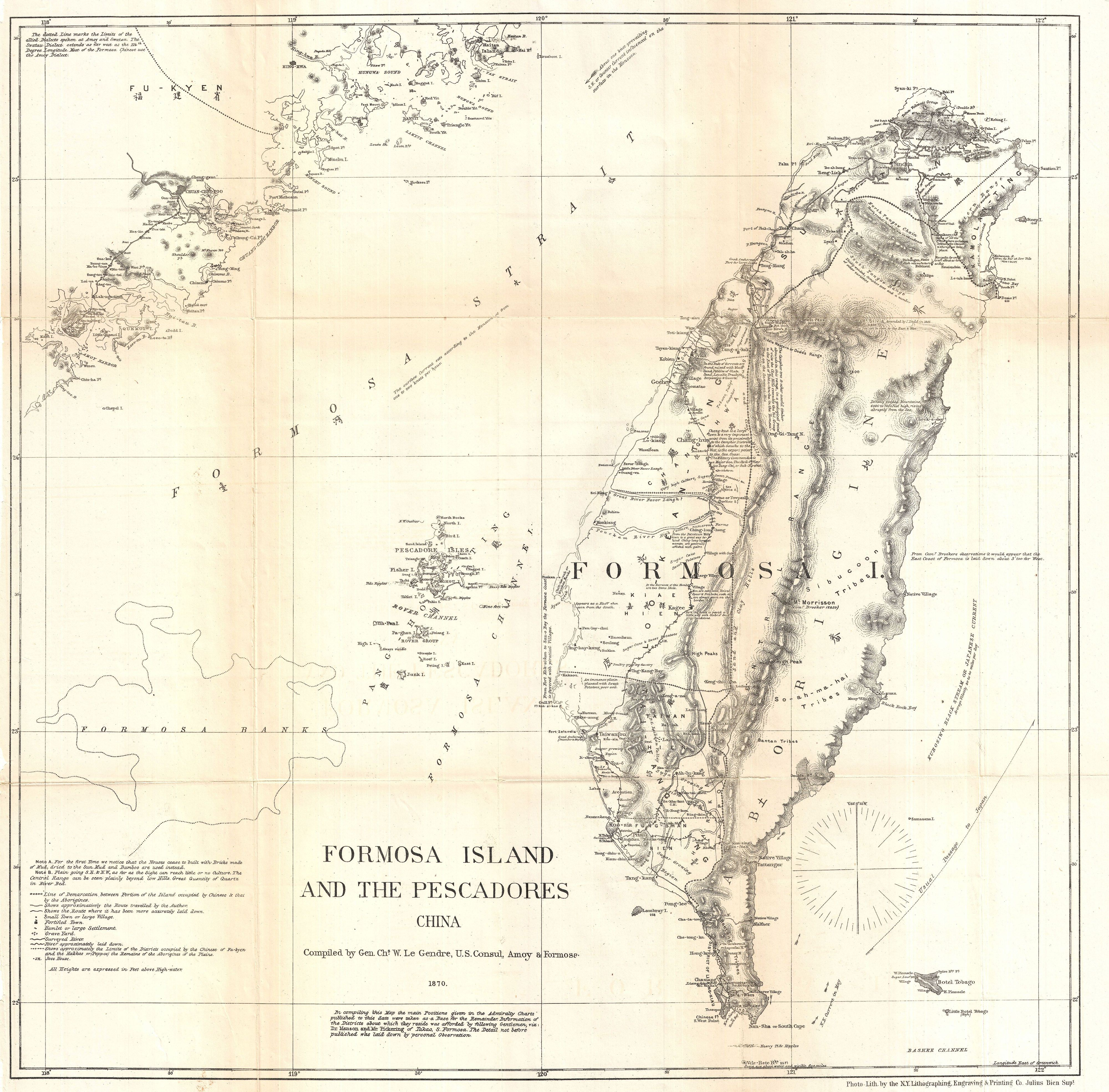
Map of Taiwan compiled by Charles Le Gendre in 1870, with Taiwan Bank labeled as "Formosa Banks".

Taiwan Bank, also known as Taiwan Shoal or the Formosa Bank, is an ocean bank located on the seabed at the southern end of the Taiwan Strait. It is situated southwest of the Penghu Islands and east of the Nanpeng Islands of Guangdong. It is known to local Penghu fishermen as the Lâm-tshián Fishing Ground (Chinese: 南淺漁場; Tâi-lô: Lâm-tshián Hû-tiûnn; lit. 'South Shallow Fishing Ground').

Taiwan Bank is a residual sedimentation of continental shelf. The undersea terrain of the Taiwan Strait used to be a valley, and had been constantly accumulating soil and sand from both sides since the Pliocene until the Holocene, when sea levels rose and remains of sands beneath the sea become oceanic bank.

The Kuroshio Current and typhoon waves help push sands on the seabed to the north, but are blocked by ancient volcanic rocks and beach rocks, thus while the sands are constantly moving, they would not be transported to weaker current areas further away. On the other hand, south-flowing currents and waves caused by northeasterly trade wind transport sand on the bank to the south. These forces in both directions cancel out each other's reached relative stability and equilibrium, forming sand waves and dunes under the sea.

Some academics have hypothesized that during the Little Ice Age when the sea level dropped, Taiwan Bank might have been inhabitable by humans. Thus, they think the island marked Dongning on the map Kunyu Wanguo Quantu published in year 1602 could in fact be Taiwan Bank instead of the Taiwan Island.

== Resource dispute ==
Due to rich construction grade sand deposits on Taiwan Bank, many mainland Chinese ships have tried to gather sands from the area in recent years, due to restrictions by the Chinese government against gathering sand from Chinese rivers and coastal areas.
