= List of shipwrecks in February 1886 =

The list of shipwrecks in February 1886 includes ships sunk, foundered, grounded, or otherwise lost during February 1886.

== 1 February ==
List of shipwrecks: 1 February 1886
Ship	State	Description
Alma	United Kingdom	The ship foundered in the North Sea off Kettleness, Yorkshire. Her crew were rescued. She was on a voyage from Sunderland, County Durham to Whitby, Yorkshire.
Cervantes	United Kingdom	The barque struck a rock off Kettleness and was abandoned. Her nineteen crew took to two boats; eleven in one boat were rescued by the steamship Errington (United Kingdom). Eight in the other boat were reported missing. Cervantes was on a voyage from the River Tyne to Cartagena, Spain.
Julia	United Kingdom	The schooner ran into the steamship Ogmore (United Kingdom) and sank at Penarth, Glamorgan. Her crew were rescued.
Neiro	(United Kingdom of Great Britain and Ireland) Jersey	The ketch ran aground on the Maplin Sands, in the North Sea off the coast of Essex. She was refloated and taken in to Southend, Essex in a severely leaky condition.

== 3 February ==
List of shipwrecks: 3 February 1886
Ship	State	Description
Hope	United Kingdom	The Thames barge was run into by the steamship Dundee and sank at Ratcliff, Middlesex.

== 5 February ==
List of shipwrecks: 5 February 1886
Ship	State	Description
Asiana, Equator, Erin's Gem, and Ophir	United States; United States; United Kingdom; United States	The steamship Castle Craig (United Kingdom) ran into the full-rigged ships Asiana and Equator, the steamship Erin's Gem and the barque Ophir at New Orleans, Louisiana. All four vessels were damaged; Asiana and Equator very severely.
Rosa	United Kingdom	The steamship collided with the tug No. 9 (United Kingdom) in the River Ouse and was severely damaged. Rosa was on a voyage from Ghent, West Flanders, Belgium to Goole, Yorkshire.
Saxon	United Kingdom	The steamship was wrecked in the Caicos Islands with the loss of all but two of her crew. She was on a voyage from Saint Domingo to New York, United States.

== 7 February ==
List of shipwrecks: 7 February 1886
Ship	State	Description
Hope	United Kingdom	The schooner ran aground at Port Eynon Point, Glamorgan, and was abandoned by her crew. She was on a voyage from Newport, Monmouthshire to New Ross, County Wexford. She was later refloated, repaired, and returned to service.
Maury	Norway	The barque collided with Sir Henry Lawrence (United Kingdom) and was abandoned in the Atlantic Ocean 40 nautical miles (74 km) west of the Old Head of Kinsale, County Cork, United Kingdom with the loss of a crew member. Survivors were rescued by Sir Henry Lawrence. Maury was on a voyage from New York, United States to Limerick, United Kingdom. She was subsequently discovered by County of Kinross (United Kingdom), which put five of her crew aboard. The sailed her to Passage East and she was towed in to Waterford, United Kingdom by the tug Great Western (United Kingdom).

== 8 February ==
List of shipwrecks: 8 February 1886
Ship	State	Description
Obock	France	The steamship ran aground in Lake Timsah. She was on a voyage from the East Indies to Marseille, Bouches-du-Rhône. She was refloated.
Perfect	United Kingdom	The schooner foundered in Youghal Bay. Her crew survived.
Veronica	United Kingdom	The ship barque collided with the barque Marquis of Worcester (United Kingdom) and sank at Port Nolloth, Cape Colony. Her crew were rescued. Veronica was on a voyage from the Cape Colony to Aberdeen.

== 9 February ==
List of shipwrecks: 9 February 1886
Ship	State	Description
Flying Spray	United Kingdom	The fishing trawler ran aground at Berwick upon Tweed, Northumberland.
Two Sisters	United Kingdom	The ship was driven ashore 2 nautical miles (3.7 km) south of Seaham, County Durham. She was on a voyage from Chichester, Sussex to Seaham.
Victor	France	The steamship was driven ashore at Tolmo, Spain. All on board were rescued. She was a total loss.

== 10 February ==
List of shipwrecks: 10 February 1886
Ship	State	Description
Cambridge	United States	The passenger ship, a paddle steamer, struck the Old Man Ledge, a reef 5 nautical miles (9.3 km) south south west of Port Clyde, Maine and sank in the Atlantic Ocean (43°50′41″N 69°18′56″W) without loss of life.
Flamingo	United Kingdom	The steamship was run into by the steamship Glenmoor (United Kingdom) and sank in the River Mersey with the loss of a crew member. Flamingo was on a voyage from Antwerp, Belgium to Liverpool, Lancashire. She broke in two on 18 February and was a total loss.
Lizzie H. Haskell	United States	The schooner was wrecked on Plum Island. Her crew were rescued.
Taurus	France	The steamship was driven ashore at Cape Suvero, Italy.
W. E. Heard	United Kingdom	The ship ran aground on her anchor at Buenos Aires, Argentina and was holed. She was on a voyage from Cardiff, Glamorgan to Buenos Aires.

== 11 February ==
List of shipwrecks: 11 February 1886
Ship	State	Description
Kraljevica	Austria-Hungary	The barque was wrecked on the coast of New Jersey, United States with the loss of eight of her fourteen crew. Three members of the United States Life-Saving Service were lost effecting the rescue.
Pactolus	United Kingdom	The steamship was wrecked off the Île d'Yeu, Finistère, France. Her eighteen crew survived. She was on a voyage from Glasgow, Renfrewshire to Bordeaux, Gironde, France.
Success	United Kingdom	The schooner was run down by a steamship and sank off the Gunfleet Sand, in the North Sea off the coast of Essex. Her crew were rescued by Reindeer (United Kingdom). Success was on a voyage from London to Wisbech, Cambridgeshire.

== 12 February ==
List of shipwrecks: 12 February 1886
Ship	State	Description
Avoca	United Kingdom	The steamship collided with the steamship Chimborazo at Gravesend, Kent and was severely damaged. Avoca was on a voyage from London to Dublin. She put back to London.
Baron Osy	Belgium	The paddle steamer was run into by the steamship Oceano (United Kingdom) at Greenwich, Kent, United Kingdom and was severely damaged.
Falcon	United Kingdom	The steamship was driven ashore at Sheerness, Kent. She was on a voyage from Hamburg, Germany to London.
Kepler	United Kingdom	The steamship ran ashore and was wrecked 2 nautical miles (3.7 km) north of Flamborough Head, Yorkshire. She was on a voyage from Sunderland, County Durham to London.
Lancet	United Kingdom	The brig was driven ashore 1 nautical mile (1.9 km) south of Flamborough Head. She was on a voyage from London to South Shields, County Durham. She was refloated on 16 February and towed in to Bridlington, Yorkshire by two tugs.
Olive Branch	United Kingdom	The brig was driven ashore 1 nautical mile (1.9 km) south of Flamborough Head. She was on a voyage from Ramsgate, Kent to Hartlepool, County Durham.
William and Mary	United Kingdom	The Thames barge was run into by the steamship Rimataka (Flag unknown) and sank in the River Thames at Gravesend.

== 13 February ==
List of shipwrecks: 13 February 1886
Ship	State	Description
Athlete	United States	The steamship was destroyed by fire at New Smyrna, Florida.
Castlemaine	United Kingdom	The steamship collided with the steamship Claude (United Kingdom) 5 nautical miles (9.3 km) off Cromer, Norfolk and was severely damaged. Castlemaine was on a voyage from Constanţa, Romania to King's Lynn, Norfolk. She completed her voyage.
Electryon	United Kingdom	The schooner foundered in the North Sea 15 nautical miles (28 km) off Flamborough Head, Yorkshire. Her crew were rescued by the smack Maud (United Kingdom). Electryon was on a voyage from South Shields, County Durham to London.
Little William	United Kingdom	The smack was driven ashore in Filey Bay. Her crew survived. She was refloated and taken in to Scarborough, Yorkshire.
Racine	United Kingdom	The steamship struck a rock and sank at Bilbao, Spain.
Wynberge	Belgium	The fishing smack collided with the barque Vanadis (Norway) and sank in the North Sea. Her six crew were rescued by Vanadis.

== 15 February ==
List of shipwrecks: 15 February 1886
Ship	State	Description
Mary E. McDonald	United States	The schooner was wrecked at Port Jolie, Nova Scotia, Canada. Her crew were rescued.
Truth Seeker	United Kingdom	The schooner was driven ashore at Sheerness, Kent.

== 16 February ==
List of shipwrecks: 16 February 1886
Ship	State	Description
Dannevirke	Denmark	The schooner was driven ashore on Læsø. She was on a voyage from Sønderborg to Rotterdam, South Holland, Netherlands. She was refloated and taken in to Fredrikshavn.
Latona	United Kingdom	The barque was driven ashore on Amrum, Germany. She was on a voyage from Iquique, Peru to Hamburg, Germany. She was refloated with the assistance of a steamship and resumed her voyage.
Paradis	Norway	The barque was driven ashore at Dartmouth, Devon, United Kingdom. She was on a voyage from Newcastle upon Tyne, Northumberland, United Kingdom to Saint Croix.

== 17 February ==
List of shipwrecks: 17 February 1886
Ship	State	Description
Annie D.	United States	The schooner was destroyed by fire on the Georges Bank. Her crew were rescued.
Dule	United Kingdom	The schooner struck a sunken rock at Pembroke Dock, Pembrokeshire and sprang a severe leak. She was on a voyage from the Carlingford Lough to Pembroke Dock.
Miroslav	Austria-Hungary	The ship departed from the Delaware Breakwater, United States for Fiume. No further trace, reported missing.
Young America	United States	The clipper passed the Delaware Breakwater whilst on a voyage from Philadelphia, Pennsylvania to Fiume. No further trace.

== 22 February ==
List of shipwrecks: 22 February 1886
Ship	State	Description
Darlington	United Kingdom	The ship was wrecked on reefs 10 nautical miles (19 km) north of Bermuda. She was on a voyage from New Orleans, Louisiana, United States to Bremen, Germany.
Solo	Sweden	The barque sprang a leak in the Atlantic Ocean and was abandoned. Her crew were rescued by Beaconsfield (United Kingdom). Solo was on a voyage from Liverpool, Lancashire, United Kingdom to Halifax, Nova Scotia, Canada.

== 25 February ==
List of shipwrecks: 25 February 1886
Ship	State	Description
Favourite	United Kingdom	The fishing trawler was run into by the barque St. Pierre (France) and sank in the English Channel 25 nautical miles (46 km) off Berry Head, Devon. Her five crew were rescued by St. Pierre.
Idlewild	United States	The steamship was wrecked in Long Island Sound. Her passengers were rescued.
Mariner's Guide	United Kingdom	The fishing smack was driven ashore and wrecked at Lossiemouth, Moray. Her crew were rescued.
Orianna	Canada	The schooner was wrecked on the Bemo Ledges. Her crew were rescued.
Problem	United Kingdom	The brigantine struck a submerged object east of Prawle Point, Devon and foundered. Her crew survived. She was on a voyage from Ipswich, Suffolk to Plymouth, Devon.
Robert and Thomas	United Kingdom	The Thames barge was run into by the steamship Anglo-Dane (United Kingdom) and sank in the River Thames at Northfleet, Kent.

== 26 February ==
List of shipwrecks: 26 February 1886
Ship	State	Description
Cape Horn	United Kingdom	The ship departed from Setvebonde, Java, Netherlands East Indies for the English Channel. No further trace, reported missing.
Eagle	United Kingdom	The ship collided with the steamship Donegal in the Belfast Lough and was abandoned. Her crew were rescued by Donegal. Eagle was discovered off Ayr the next day by Monarch (United Kingdom), which towed her in to Belfast, County Antrim.
Favourite	United Kingdom	The fishing trawler was run down by the barque St Pierre (France) 25 nautical miles (46 km) off Berry Head, Devon. All five crew survived.
Glentilt	United Kingdom	The steamship ran aground at Trouville-sur-Mer, Calvados, France. She was on a voyage from Alloa, Clackmannanshire to Trouville.
Horatio	United Kingdom	The ship departed from Troon, Ayrshire for Demerara, British Guiana. No further trace, reported missing.
Leslie	United Kingdom	The schooner was driven ashore and wrecked on Inishtrahull, County Donegal. Her crew were rescued.

== 27 February ==
List of shipwrecks: 27 February 1886
Ship	State	Description
Giuseppina Accame	Italy	The ship departed from Banjoewangie, Netherlands East Indies for Falmouth, Cornwall, United Kingdom. No further trace, reported missing.
Rowland Hill	United Kingdom	The barque was abandoned in the Atlantic Ocean. Her crew were rescued by the brigantine Clifford (United Kingdom). Rowland Hill was on a voyage from Saint John, New Brunswick, Canada to Liverpool, Lancashire.
Volmer	Denmark	The steamship ran aground at Penarth, Glamorgan, United Kingdom.

== 28 February ==
List of shipwrecks: 28 February 1886
Ship	State	Description
Isabel	(United Kingdom of Great Britain and Ireland) Guernsey	The brig ran aground and was wrecked on the Bembridge Ledge, off the Isle of Wight. Her crew were rescued. She was on a voyage from Guernsey to London.
Mère du Sauveur	France	The schooner was driven ashore and wrecked on the Pendine Sands, Carmarthenshire, United Kingdom with the loss of all hands. She was on a voyage from La Rochelle, Charente-Inférieure to Newport, Monmouthshire, United Kingdom.
Missouri	Flag unknown	The ship was driven ashore at the South Stack, Anglesey, United Kingdom. She heeled over and sank the next day.
Odin	Norway	The schooner was abandoned in the North Sea 200 nautical miles (370 km) south west half south of Spurn Point, Yorkshire, United Kingdom. Her crew were rescued by the fishing smack James Spurgeon (United Kingdom). Odin was on a voyage from Newcastle upon Tyne, Northumberland, United Kingdom to Kragerø.
Unnamed	Flag unknown	The waterlogged barque was beached at Vila Franca do Campo, São Miguel Island, Azores. She subsequently broke up.

== Unknown date ==
List of shipwrecks: Unknown date in February 1886
Ship	State	Description
Aghios Nicolaus	Greece	The ship was wrecked. She was on a voyage from a Greek port to Cette, Hérault and Marseille, Bouches-du-Rhône, France.
Alice and John	United Kingdom	The ship ran aground at Exmouth, Devon.
Alina	Russia	The brigantine ran aground on the Iron Bank, at the mouth of the River Tay. Her crew were rescued.
Alstepha	Norway	The barque was driven ashore and wrecked at Coatzacoalcos, Mexico. She was on a voyage from Coatzacoalcos to London, United Kingdom.
Antares	South Australia	The ship was driven ashore at Trowbridge.
Arran	United Kingdom	The ship was wrecked. She was on a voyage from the Clyde to Mobile, Alabama, United States.
Aurora	United Kingdom	The ketch was driven ashore at Baggy Point, Devon.
Bohemia	Germany	The steamship ran aground in the Elbe at Schulau. She was on a voyage from Hamburg to New York, United States.
Bonnie Lass	United Kingdom	The smack ran aground on the Iwas Bank, in the North Sea and sank. Her crew were rescued.
Camden	United Kingdom	The steamship was damaged by fire at West Point, Virginia, United States.
Charles Platt	United States	The ship was driven ashore at Long Beach, New York. She was on a voyage from Pernambuco, Brazil to New York. She subsequently became a wreck.
Cyclone	United States	The ship was wrecked in the Bahamas. She was on a voyage from New Orleans, Louisiana to New York.
Douglas	China	The steamship was wrecked in the Nanpeng Islands with the loss of eighteen lives.
Edward	United Kingdom	The schooner was driven ashore at Troup Head, Aberdeenshire.
Eliza Bain	United Kingdom	The ship ran aground at Hayle, Cornwall.
Embla	Flag unknown	The ship was abandoned in the Atlantic Ocean 200 nautical miles (370 km) south of Bermuda. Her five crew were rescued by St. Albans (United Kingdom). Embla was on a voyage from Philadelphia, Pennsylvania, United States to Alicante, Spain.
Eureka	United Kingdom	The steamship struck the South Rock, off the coast of County Down. She was beached at Portaferry. She was on a voyage from Bilbao, Spain to Glasgow, Renfrewshire.
Excelsior	United Kingdom	The steamship was driven ashore on the Isle of Skye, Outer Hebrides. She was refloated and taken in to Ardrossan, Ayrshire, where he arrived on 9 February.
Faran	Austria-Hungary	The barque was wrecked at Martinique. Her crew were rescued.
Five Brothers	United States	The ship was abandoned in the Atlantic Ocean. She was on a voyage from St. Marc, Haiti to New York. She was subsequently taken in to New York by a prize crew.
Flora	United Kingdom	The schooner was wrecked. All on board were rescued. She was on a voyage from Newcastle upon Tyne to Suva, Fiji.
France	United Kingdom	The steamship ran aground at New York. She was on a voyage from New York to London. She was refloated with assistance and resumed her voyage.
Fratz	Germany	The steamship was driven ashore near Ronehamn, Gotland, Sweden.
Fredrika Karolina	Sweden	The barque was wrecked on the Goodwin Sands, Kent, United Kingdom. Her crew were rescued. She was on a voyage from Brest, Finistère, France to Helsingør, Denmark.
Giuseppina Accame	Italy	The barque departed from Passaroeang, Netherlands East Indies for Falmouth, Cornwall, United Kingdom on 26 or 27 February. No further trace, reported missing.
Glenisla	United Kingdom	The steamship struck a sunken rock off St. Davids Head, Pembrokeshire and was wrecked. Her crew were rescued. she was on a voyage from Glasgow to Savona, Italy.
Gold Digger	United Kingdom	The fishing trawler ran aground and sank at Berwick upon Tweed, Northumberland. The wreck subsequently broke up.
Hamburg	Flag unknown	The steamship was driven ashore at Paull, Yorkshire, United Kingdom. She was on a voyage from Hull, Yorkshire to Hamburg. She was refloated on 15 February with the assistance of a tug and resumed her voyage.
Harvest	United Kingdom	The steamship was driven ashore at Genoa, Italy. She was refloated and taken in to Genoa.
Hazelholme	United Kingdom	The barque was driven ashore and wrecked at "Las Vilas".
Helen Fox	United Kingdom	The barque was damaged by fire at New York.
James	United Kingdom	The schooner was driven ashore and wrecked at Kildonan, Isle of Arran. She was on a voyage from Ayr to Belfast, County Antrim.
James Barras	United States	The ship was driven ashore at "False Point, Cape Virginia". She was on a voyage from Benisaf, Algeria to Baltimore, Maryland.
Jason	United Kingdom	The ship was driven ashore at "Acheepore", India. She was on a voyage from Calcutta, India to London. She was refloated with assistance and subsequently resumed her voyage.
Jens Benzon	Denmark	The schooner ran aground on the Hinder Bank, in the North Sea off the coast of Zeeland, Netherlands. She was on a voyage from Copenhagen to Leuven, Flemish Brabant, Belgium. She was refloated with the assistance of a tug and taken in to Hellevoet, Zeeland in a severely leaky condition.
John Rutherford	United Kingdom	The barque sprang a leak and was beached on Rossa Island, near Teulada, Sardinia, Italy. She was on a voyage from Trapani, Sicily, Italy to Boston, Massachusetts, United States.
Joseph Rickett	United Kingdom	The steamship was driven ashore 2 nautical miles (3.7 km) north of Staithes, Yorkshire. She was refloated.
J. W. Parker	United Kingdom	The ship caught fire and was beached.
Kepler	United Kingdom	The steamship ran aground at Blyth, Northumberland and was severely damaged.
Kong Oscar	Norway	The steamship was wrecked on the Sow and Pigs Rocks, on the coast of Northumberland. Her crew were rescued.
Laura	United Kingdom	The steamship was wrecked on the Carr Rocks, on the coast of Fife. Her crew were rescued.
Leeds	United Kingdom	The schooner collided with the schooner General Havelock (United Kingdom) off Bridlington, Yorkshire and was severely damaged. Leeds was on a voyage from Newcastle upon Tyne, Northumberland to London. She put in to Scarborough, Yorkshire, where she ran aground.
Magnolia	Canada	The full-rigged ship was driven ashore near "Duffryan", Merionethshire, United Kingdom. She was refloated on 15 February with the assistance of two tugs and taken in tow for Liverpool.
Margrete	Denmark	The ship was driven ashore at "Aveira".
Mary Anne	United Kingdom	The schooner was driven ashore and wrecked in the River Bann.
Meta	Germany	The brigantine was wrecked at Corinto, Nicaragua. Her crew were rescued.
Minerva	United Kingdom	The schooner ran aground on the Calloway Reef, off the coast of County Antrim. She was refloated on 10 February and resumed her voyage.
Miranda, and Sierra Colonna	United Kingdom; Flag unknown	The steamships collided at Liverpool, Lancashire and were both severely damaged. Miranda was on a voyage from London to Liverpool. Sierra Colonna was on a voyage from Rangoon, Burma to Liverpool.
Odiel	United Kingdom	The steamship was driven ashore at Redcar, Yorkshire. She was on a voyage from Huelva, Spain to Newcastle upon Tyne.
Ortegal	France	The steamship ran aground at Dunkerque, Nord and was severely damaged. She was on a voyage from the River Plate to Dunkerque.
Pennon	United Kingdom	The steamship ran aground at Newry, County Antrim. She was on a voyage from Swansea, Glamorgan to Newry.
Pieter de Cormick	Belgium	The steamship ran aground at Antwerp. She was on a voyage from Antwerp to New York.
Planet	United Kingdom	The steamship collided with Bradford (United Kingdom) and was severely damaged. Planet was on a voyage from Bilbao, Spain to Rotterdam, South Holland, Netherlands.
Rokeby Hall	United Kingdom	The barque ran aground at Blankenese, Germany. She was on a voyage from Talcahuano, Mexico to Hamburg.
Rye Merchant	United Kingdom	The schooner ran aground on the Bull Sand, off the mouth of the Humber. Her crew were rescued.
Sanvic	France	The barque was driven ashore and wrecked at Monte Cristi, Dominican Republic. She was on a voyage from Havre de Grâce, Seine-Inférieure to Haiti.
Sitona	Sweden	The steamship was driven ashore. She was on a voyage from Uddevalla to London.
St. Agnes	United Kingdom	The schooner was driven ashore at St. Agnes, Cornwall. She was on a voyage from Newport, Monmouthshire to St. Agnes.
Vanadis	United Kingdom	The steamship ran aground at Blyth. She was refloated and resumed her voyage.
Volana	United Kingdom	The steamship caught fire at sea and was severely damaged. She was on a voyage from Saint-Malo, Ille-et-Vilaine, France to Jersey, Channel Islands. She put back to Saint-Malo.
Ystava	Norway	The barque was driven ashore in the Bali Strait.
Waihora	Victoria	The steamship sprang a leak and was beached on Swan Island. All on board were rescued. She was on a voyage from Bluff, New Zealand to Melbourne.
Wydale	United Kingdom	The steamship ran aground at Maassluis, South Holland. She was on a voyage from New Orleans to Rotterdam.
Zante	United Kingdom	The barque was driven ashore 3 nautical miles (5.6 km) north of Staithes, Yorkshire.
Zele	United States	The ship caught fire at sea and put in to the Rio Grande. She was on a voyage from Boston, Massachusetts to Fremantle, Western Australia.
Unnamed	Flag unknown	The barque was driven ashore at Aveiro, Portugal.
