= Francis Gregory =

American naval officer

Francis Hoyt Gregory
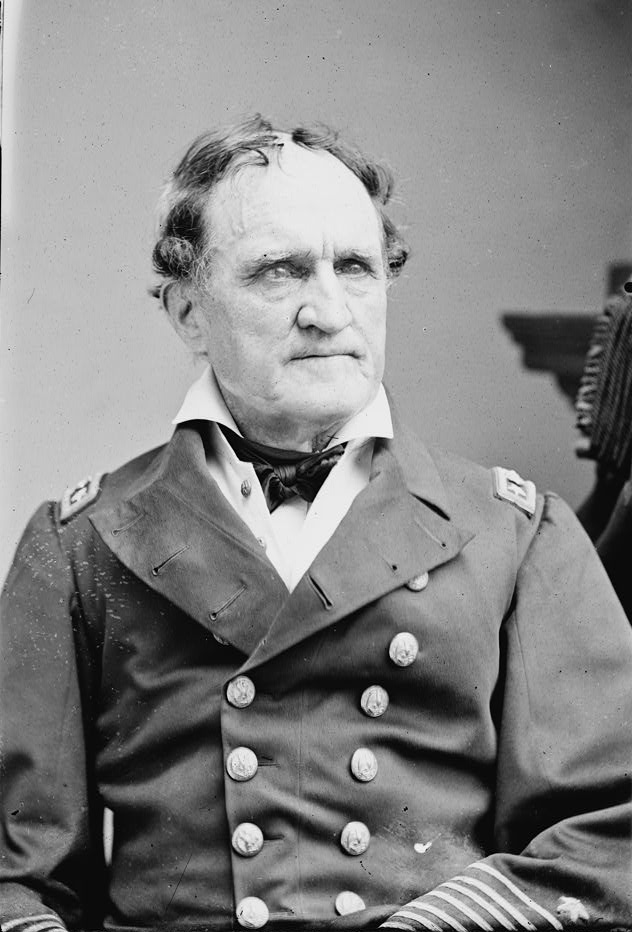
- Born: October 9, 1789; Norwalk, Connecticut, US
- Died: October 4, 1866 (aged 76); Brooklyn, New York, US
- Burial place: New Haven, Connecticut, US
- Military career
- Allegiance: United States
- Branch: United States Navy; Union Navy
- Service years: 1809–1865
- Rank: Rear admiral
- Conflicts: War of 1812; Mexican–American War; American Civil War

Francis Hoyt Gregory (October 9, 1789 – October 4, 1866) was an officer in the United States Navy during the War of 1812 through to the Civil War, serving then as a rear admiral.

== Early life and War of 1812 service ==
Gregory was born in Norwalk, Connecticut, the son of Moses Gregory and Esther Hoyt. He was the third great-grandson of John Gregory, founding settler of Norwalk. While in the American merchant marine, he was impressed by the Royal Navy after being suspected of being a British deserter. After escaping, Gregory was appointed a midshipman on January 16, 1809, by President Jefferson and reported to the Revenge, commanded by Oliver Hazard Perry.

In March, 1809, Gregory was transferred to the Gulf Squadron at New Orleans, Louisiana. In 1811, while serving in the Vesuvius and as acting captain of Gun Boat 162, Gregory participated in three notable actions. On August 7, off Pensacola, Midshipman Gregory attacked and crippled the pirate schooner La Franchise. On August 10, off Mobile, he attacked and captured the pirate schooner Santa Maria. On September 11, between Brassa and Barataria, Louisiana, Midshipman Gregory and his crew captured the pirate ship La Divina, and the schooners La Sophie and Le Vengeance.

During the War of 1812, he served on Lake Ontario under Commodore Isaac Chauncey and participated in attacks on Toronto, Kingston, and Fort George. In August 1814, Gregory was captured by the British; refused parole, he was sent to England and remained there until June 1815, months after the end of hostilities.

== Command assignments, 1820s to early 1830s ==
After he was released by the British, Gregory joined the Mediterranean Squadron and operated along the North African coast until 1821. In that year, he became captain of Grampus and spent the following two years cruising the West Indies to suppress piracy. While in the Indies, Gregory captured the notorious pirate brig Panchita and destroyed several other pirate ships. In 1824, Gregory fitted out the frigate Brandywine, destined to carry the Marquis de la Fayette back to France. In 1826 Gregory sailed a 64-gun frigate named HELLAS from Christopher Bergh's shipyard in New York City's lower East Side to Greece for the revolutionary government. The Hellas became the Greek Navy's first flagship, fighting for the country's independence from the Ottoman Empire. From 1824 to 1828 Gregory served at the New York Navy Yard, and in 1831 reported to the Pacific Station for a three-year cruise in command of Falmouth. Gregory served as commander of the Station for one year.

== Command assignments, late 1830s to 1850s ==
From the Pacific Ocean, Gregory—appointed a Captain in 1838—sailed to the Gulf of Mexico, where he commanded North Carolina and Raritan and served in the blockade of the Mexican coast during the Mexican–American War.

After the Mexican War, Gregory commanded the squadron off the African coast, with Portsmouth as his flagship, until June 1851. Returning to the United States, he became commandant of the Boston Navy Yard in May 1852 and served there through February 1856. His subsequent retirement ended a Navy career that had spanned nearly 50 years.

== Civil War duty and last years ==
When the Civil War rolled across the land, Gregory returned to naval service to superintend the construction and fitting-out of naval vessels in private shipyards, including iron-clad vessels. Promoted to Rear Admiral July 16, 1862, he served throughout the four years of war and then retired again.

Rear Admiral Gregory died in Brooklyn, New York, on October 4, 1866, and was buried at New Haven, Connecticut.

== Legacy ==
Two ships were named USS Gregory for him.

There is an old family story related to Admiral Gregory during his imprisonment in England during the War of 1812.

He had been placed under "house arrest" at a country estate, where he lived by a gentleman's agreement not to attempt escape by passing beyond certain boundaries, one of which was defined by a large stone marker. At some point, there was a formal dinner party at another estate a mile or so away that the captain wished to attend, yet was beyond the set boundary.

The dinner guests were surprised during the party by the arrival of the American captain, and he was accused of violating the terms of his incarceration by going beyond the marker.

The captain smilingly ushered the complainants outside...where they found a wheelbarrow parked at the far corner of the house containing the large marker stone.

Admiral Gregory was married to Elizabeth, daughter of Captain John Shaw, an early naval commander and a hero of the 1st Barbary Coast campaign and the War of 1812.
