= Nan'ao General Headquarters =

The Nan'ao General Headquarters (南澳总兵府) is located in Nan'ao County, Shantou, Guangdong province, China. It served as a military center for coastal defense of Guangdong, Fujian province, and Taiwan. The Headquarters is now used as a museum of coast defense.

== History ==
Nan’ao Island lies between the Eastern Guangdong province and the Southern Fujian province. It is a strategically important island along the coastline of southeast China. In the Ming and Qing dynasties, the government had to control the smuggling and fight against pirates. As troops continuously gathered on the island, the administrative level of Nan’ao Island upgraded and gradually Nan'ao Island became one of the most important military bases of Guangdong, Fujian and Taiwan province. In 1576, Yan Jifang (晏继芳), a vice-general of Nao'ao military base, ordered the construction of an administrative building. In 1581, the successive vice-general, Hou Jigao (侯继高), expanded the administrative building and added a backyard to it. The basic layout of the Nan'ao General Headquarters formed.

During the Ming and Qing dynasties, a total of 147 commanders were distributed to Nan'ao Island. Many of them made contributions to the coastal defense. In the late Ming dynasty, Zheng Chenggong (郑成功), a general, once delivered a speech at the Headquarters to recruit soldiers for the war against the Netherlands army in Taiwan. In 1997, the local government placed a granite sculpture of Zheng Chenggong in memorial of him.

Now a museum about coastal defense has been set in the Headquarters.

== Attractions in the Headquarters ==
The Zhaobing Tree (招兵树), a huge banyan tree, stands at the front gate of the headquarters. In January 1647 a general named Zheng Chenggong arrived in Nan'ao and gave a speech to recruit soldiers under the tree. Fifteen years later he defeated the Dutch in Taiwan. In memorial of this battle and Zheng Chenggong, people call the banyan tree Zhaobing Tree, since Zhaobing is the Pinyin for soldiers' recruitment.

A large bronze cannon was set beneath the Zhaobing Tree in 1840 some officials of the headquarters. It weighs 4000 kg, and cannons of this weight are rare in Guangdong province. The cannon has letters that read "The suggestion to build this cannon is made by Deng Tingzhen (邓廷桢), the governor of Fujian and Zhejiang province, Bao (given name missing), the general of Fujian province, and Wu (given name missing), the grand coordinator of Fujian. The governor's assistant, Fu (given name missing), received the task to build the cannon in the fall of 1840. The cannon weighs 4000 kg. The supervisor was Gu DeMing (顾德铭). The head technician was Lin ChaoYing (林朝英)."

Inside the Headquarters contains a main hall, a front hall, two rooms, a yard and two corridors. Both on its west and east stand two doors. The Headquarters also features a bell tower and a drum tower. In the main hall, there are three exhibition rooms. In the first room, a sample map of Nan'ao county is presented and on the wall hang poems on paper. In the second room, a sample map of Nan'ao coast defense is on show and on the wall also hang some poems. The third room shows materials about the generals in Nan'ao.

== Supporting facilities ==
The construction of Xiongzhen Pass (雄镇关) began in 1585. The vice-general of Nan'ao General Headquarters, Liu Daxun (刘大勋), organized the construction. In 1620 the pass was expanded when another vice-general, He Binchen (何斌臣), was in office. It was once destroyed and it was rebuilt in 1689. In 1808, it underwent repair when vice-general Hu Yuhong (胡于鈜) was in office. The existing pass has a width of 7 m, a length of 24 m, and a height of 4 m. The pass is located in a valley in Shenao (深澳), and in three directions, the pass is surrounded by mountains. It serves as a door to the Nan'ao city where the General Headquarters is.

In 1623 the vice-general Li Guobing (黎国炳) organized the construction of Lieyu Fort (猎屿铳城). The fort was set in Lieyu Island and it had a cuboid outlook. When it was finished, it was 4 meters high, 18 meters wide and 54.2 meters long. Inside the fort, 18 barracks leaned by the wall of longer sides. On the platform 15 Da Jiang Jun (大将军) cannons and 8 Da Shen Fei (大神飞) cannons were installed. In July 1633, the Dutch fleet attacked Nao'ao Island and soldiers of the Ming dynasty counterattacked by using the cannons on the fort.

== Some representative generals ==
Bai Hanji (白翰纪) is the first vice-general in Nan'ao Headquarters. He is from Changli (昌黎), Hebei province. His great-grandfather Yi (毅) was once appointed as a commander in Leizhou, Guangdong province. Yi died in a defensive battle of Leizhou with a tribe named Yao (猺). Bai Hanji succeeded Yi's position from his father Yu (钰). In 1576, he was promoted as a vice-general in Nan'ao. Nao'ao town was newly set up at that time, and he came and reorganized the troops there and the repairing work of arms and battle ships. He also organized people there to build a town and solidify the town. He died of disease caused by tiredness and people there mourned his death.

Liu Yongfu (刘永福) was born in Guangxi province. He was an official of the Qing dynasty with the title of "Yiboduoen Warrior" (依博德恩巴图鲁). In 1891, he re-assumed office in Nan'ao General Headquarters from Jieshi (碣石) town, Guangdong province. In 1901, he was appointed to Taiwan as an imperial envoy and was in charge of Taiwan's military affairs. His general career began from Sino-French War in 1873. He used to be a member of an anti-Qing dynasty organization and took over the groups of members after the leader's death. He expanded his army from soldiers of 200 to 2000 until 1873. He won many victories in the War and when the War was over, he was admitted by the Qing dynasty and was promoted as a general. Liu Yongfu once led the war against Japanese Empire in Taiwan in 1895 and lost the war and his whole army. After the war in Taiwan, he kept distance from the Qing dynasty and contacted with people from revolutionary parties. He offered help to Sun Yat-sen in the Revolution of 1911. In 1917, he died in Qinzhou, Guangxi province.

Zheng Zhilong (郑芝龙) was from Tongan, Fujian province. He started his career first as a merchant and then as a pirate. His foreign name was "Nicholas Iquan". As his pirate army became stronger, the Ming dynasty could hardly completely defeat Zheng Zhilong and then it offered amnesty and enlistment to him in 1628. In 1636 Zheng Zhilong was appointed as a vice-general at Nan'ao military base. Later in 1637, he was deposed from the vice-general of Nan'ao base, and in 1638 he gained his promotion to the vice-general of Nan'ao base from a general of a guerrilla force of Fujian. In 1646, Zheng Zhilong surrendered to the Qing dynasty. In 1661, after the Qing dynasty failed to use him as a hostage to force his son, Zheng Chenggong (郑成功), to surrender, he was killed in Heilongjiang province.
