= Nan'ao Wind Farm =

Wind farm in Shantou, Guangdong, China

- Country: China
- Location: Nan'ao County, Shantou, Guangdong
- Coordinates: 23.4495°N 117.026°E
- Status: Operational
- Construction began: 1989
- Owner: multiple

Wind farm
- Type: onshore

Power generation
- Units operational: 236
- Nameplate capacity: 171.7 MW
- Annual net output: 370,000 MWh

The Nan'ao Wind Farm, located on the central part of Nan'ao Island of Shantou City, Guangdong Province, China, is the largest island wind farm in Asia.

The total installed capacity of wind power on the island is about 171,700 kilowatts. Nan'ao island is rich in wind resources. with an average annual wind speed of 8.54 m/s. and an effective wind speed of more than 7,000 hours.

== Development ==
Since 1989, wind farms have been built and developed in Nan'ao County. Nine companies have participated in the project through wholly owned, financing, Sino-foreign joint ventures, or joint-stock cooperation. So far, the project has gone through 13 stages.

Wind power development was initially brought to Nan'ao by the local government for electrification of the island. The continued involvement of the local government in Nan'ao's wind power industry has proved instrumental in the continued development of the island's wind resources. Selling about 75 percent of the power produced by the island's wind farms to the mainland has become a profitable industry that brings important revenue to the small island economy (U.S. Embassy Beijing, 1999).

== Details ==
There are 10 wind farms located on the central part of the Nan'ao island, with a total of 236 wind turbines. By 2020, it will be planned to add 25 wind farms (21 onshore and 4 offshore) with a total installed capacity of 621.4MW (211.4MW onshore and 410MW off shore). In the year 2016, Nanao Wind Power Project created a total wind power output of 36.29 million kWh and an output value of US$28,369,896.

== Tourism ==
In order to popularize the technology, research and development, application, value of wind power generation, and inspire people to protect and cherish the earth, resources and environment, the local government has built some science functional showrooms based on the wind farm nearby. There visitors can get wind power knowledge on wind turbine structure, power generation principle, development, status quo, significance and prospects of wind power by video, pictures and text. Otherwise, new energy projects of the 21st century, such as solar energy, wave energy, electric vehicle projects, various types of wind turbines, and related scientific knowledge, such as optoelectronics, aerodynamics, energy conversion, electromagnetic induction, electronic remote control, computer programming, power grid texture, etc., are presented to the visitors in the form of models, pictures, text, videos, slides, etc.

== See also ==
- List of power stations in China § Wind
