= USS Vesuvius (1806) =

History

United States
- Name: USS Vesuvius
- Namesake: Mount Vesuvius
- Builder: Jacob Coffin, Newburyport, Massachusetts
- Cost: $29,659
- Launched: 31 May 1806
- Commissioned: September 1806
- Decommissioned: 6 September 1810
- Stricken: 1821
- Fate: Damaged by explosion, broken up, June 1829

General characteristics
- Type: Bomb ketch
- Displacement: 145 long tons (147 t)
- Length: 82 ft 4 in (25.10 m)
- Beam: 25 ft 4 in (7.72 m)
- Draft: 8 ft 3 in (2.51 m)
- Complement: 30
- Armament: 1 × 13 in (330 mm) mortar; 8 × 9-pounder guns; 2 × 24-pound carronades

USS Vesuvius was a bomb ketch, and the first ship of the United States Navy named for the Italian volcano.

Vesuvius was built by Jacob Coffin at Newburyport, Massachusetts. She was launched on 31 May 1806 and commissioned in or before September 1806, with Lieutenant James T. Leonard in command.

== Service history ==
Vesuvius departed Boston, Massachusetts, for the Gulf of Mexico, but, while en route on 19 October, ran aground in the Gulf of Abaco. The ship lost her rudder and floated free only after her crew had jettisoned all of her guns and their carriages; her shot and shell; and even part of the kentledge. She finally reached New Orleans, Louisiana, on 27 November.

Repaired and rearmed with ten 6-pounders (2.7 kg), the ship subsequently sailed for Natchez, Mississippi, and operated out of that port from February 1807 until returning to New Orleans on 30 May. Vesuvius was then ordered north for further repairs and arrived at New York City on 16 August.

The ship apparently remained in the New York area until the spring 1809, when she again sailed for New Orleans. Embarking upon duties to suppress slave traders and pirates operating out of the trackless bayous, Vesuvius cruised off the mouth of the muddy Mississippi River and into the Gulf of Mexico, alert for any sign of illegal activity.

The crew's vigilance was rewarded in February 1810 when, under the command of Lieutenant Benjamin F. Read, Vesuvius gave chase to a pirate vessel off the mouth of the Mississippi and captured Duc de Montebello, a schooner named by Frenchmen who had been expelled from Cuba by the Spanish government. Dispatched to New Orleans, the buccaneer ship was condemned. In the same month, boats from Vesuvius, under the command of Midshipman F.H. Gregory, captured pirate schooner Diomede and slave ship Alexandria, the latter with a full cargo of slaves on board and flying British colors.

Four months later, Commander David Porter, commander of the New Orleans station, embarked in Vesuvius before the bomb ketch departed New Orleans on 10 June 1810, bound via Havana, Cuba, for Washington, DC. Also making the passage were Porter's wife and the Porters' ward, eight-year-old James Glasgow Farragut. The lad would later change his name to David Glasgow Farragut and ultimately become the Navy's first admiral.

After repairs at the Washington Navy Yard, the ketch pressed on for New York and arrived on 6 September 1810. Vesuvius was placed in ordinary, and her crew was transferred to USS Enterprise.

In 1816, Vesuvius served as a receiving ship at New York. A survey conducted in April 1818 revealed that the cost to repair and refit the ship would be, in the survey's words, "exorbitant." Still carried on the Naval Vessel Registry as a receiving ship through 1821, Vesuvius was broken up in June 1829 after being damaged beyond repair on 4 June when the old steamship Fulton exploded alongside.
