= Zhangzhou fu =

Historical administrative division of China

Location of Zhangzhou Prefecture in Fujian Province, 1820

Zhangzhou Prefecture (Chinese: 漳州府; pinyin: Zhāngzhōu Fǔ; Pe̍h-ōe-jī: Chiang-chiu-hú) was a prefecture in Fujian Province in China's imperial and early republican eras. The region, especially its governmental/commercial centre, was long known to English-readers accustomed to Wade-Giles romanisation as Changchow fu.

The region has since been reconstituted as Zhangzhou Prefecture-level city.

== See also ==
- Zhangzhou
