= Battle of Nan'ao Island =

1950 battle

Coordinates: 23.42°N 117.10°E

- Part of the Chinese Civil War
Date	23 February 1950
Location	Nan'ao Island
Result	People's Republic of China victory
Territorial changes	People's Republic of China captures Nan'ao Island

Belligerents
Republic of China (Taiwan)	People's Republic of China

Commanders and leaders
Wu Chaojun (POW)	?

Strength
1,375	~7,000

Casualties and losses
27 killed; 1,348 captured	Minor

The Battle of Nan'ao island (Nan'ao Dao, 南澳岛战斗/南澳島戰鬥) took place between the nationalists (Kuomintang) and the communists. Nan'ao Island (Nan'ao Dao, 南澳岛) of Swatow (now known as Shantou) remained in the nationalist hands after Guangdong fell into communist hands. On February 23, 1950, the 121st division of the 41st Army of the People's Liberation Army attacked the island. Faced with such overwhelming enemy, the defenders stood no chance and after eight hours of fighting, the communists succeeded in wiping out the entire nationalist garrison and thus taking the island. 27 nationalist troops were killed, and 1348 were captured, including the nationalist local commander, the deputy commander-in-chief of the 1st Cantonese Column Wu Chaojun (吴超骏/吳超駿), and the deputy commander of the nationalist 58th division Guo Mengxiong (郭梦熊/郭夢熊). A total of 1304 firearms were also captured.

The nationalist defeat proved that it was impractical to hold on to the outlying islands that were at the doorstep of the enemy but far away from any friendly bases, just like the Wanshan Archipelago Campaign would have done later. As the battle had shown, once the defenders learned that it was impossible to have any reinforcement, the morale completely collapsed and most of the defenders abandoned their weapons and attempted to hide after merely suffering 27 fatalities, and the enemy spent most of the 8 hours fighting in mop-up operations to round up the demoralized defenders. Although holding on to a distant island may have propaganda value, any initial political and psychological gains would be negated by the fallout after the inevitable defeat and the loss.

== See also ==
- Outline of the Chinese Civil War
- Outline of the military history of the People's Republic of China
- National Revolutionary Army
- History of the People's Liberation Army
- Chinese Civil War
- Battle of Nanpēng Archipelago (on smaller islands in the same county)
