= Nanpeng Islands =

Islands in the South China Sea

南澎列岛
- Interactive map of Nanpeng Islands

Geography
- Location: South China Sea
- Coordinates: 23°12′24″N 117°14′54″E
- Total islands: 6
- Major islands: Nanpeng Island; Zhongpeng Island
- Area: 0.907 km^{2} (0.350 sq mi)
- Highest elevation: 68.8 m (225.7 ft)

Administration
- China
- Province: Guangdong
- City: Shantou
- County: Nan'ao

Demographics
- Population: None permanent

Ramsar Wetland
- Official name: Guangdong Nanpeng Archipelago Wetlands
- Designated: 16 October 2015
- Reference no.: 2249

Nanpeng Islands (simplified Chinese: 南澎列岛; traditional Chinese: 南澎列島; pinyin: Nánpēng Lièdǎo) are a chain of islands located in the north of South China Sea, administered by Nan'ao County, Shantou, Guangdong, the People's Republic of China. They were formerly known to foreigners as the Lamock Islands. Nanpeng Islands consist of six islands: Nanpeng Island, Zhongpeng Island, Dingpeng Island (also known as Dongpeng Island or Yazaiyu Island), Qinpeng Island, Chizaiyu Island and Qiweiyu Island. Nanpeng Islands have two baseline points of the Chinese territorial sea.

No resident lives in the Nanpeng Islands except a garrison of the People's Liberation Army. It became a National Marine Ecological Nature Reserve in 2012, as well as a Ramsar site in 2015.

== Islands ==
Name	Area [km^{2}]	highest point [m]	Coordinates	Ref
Nanpeng Island (南澎岛)	0.362	68.8		
Zhongpeng Island (中澎岛)	0.4	50.5		
Dingpeng Island (顶澎岛)	0.1	34.5		
Qinpeng Island (芹澎岛)	0.012	9.2		
Chizaiyu Island (赤仔屿)	0.019	20		
Qiweiyu Island (旗尾屿)	0.008	2.4		

== Landmarks ==
- Guoxing Well (Koxin Well, simplified Chinese: 国姓井; traditional Chinese: 國姓井): dug by Zheng Chenggong (Koxinga) in 1659 at Zhongpeng Island.
- Nanpeng Lighthouse: a 22.8 meter-high lighthouse at the top of Nanpeng Island.

== See also ==
- Battle of Nanpeng Archipelago
