= HNLMS Java (1885) =

Unprotected cruiser/sloop

History

Netherlands
- Name: Java
- Builder: Nederlandsche Stoomboot Maatschappij, Rotterdam
- Launched: 1885

General characteristics
- Type: sloop or unprotected cruiser
- Displacement: 1280 t
- Length: 205 ft 3 in (62.56 m)
- Propulsion: 1,017 ihp (758 kW)
- Speed: 12.6 kn (14.5 mph; 23.3 km/h)
- Armament: 1 × 5.9in./25 cal. gun; 3 × 4.7in./18 cal. guns; 2 × 1-pounder guns

The Dutch ship HNLMS Java launched in 1885 at Rotterdam was a sloop or small unprotected cruiser.

The ship was named after the island of Java in the Dutch East Indies (now Indonesia). This ship was a small colonial warship, larger than most gunboats but weaker than a protected cruiser. The term sloop in the steamship era was used by some navies including the British Navy for what were essentially large gunboats. The Java resembled the Spanish unprotected cruisers of the Velasco class, which were used for colonial duties (and the unsuccessful defense of Manila Bay in 1898).

On 27 March 1886, she collided with the British full-rigged ship Loch Broom in the Atlantic Ocean 12 nautical miles (22 km) west of the Eddystone Rock, Cornwall, United Kingdom and was severely damaged. Four of her crew got aboard Loch Broom. HNLMS Java was on a voyage from Rotterdam, South Holland to Java, Netherlands East Indies. She put in to Plymouth, Devon, United Kingdom.

== Bibliography ==
- Gardiner, Robert, ed. (1979). Conway's All the World's Fighting Ships 1860–1905. New York: Mayflower Books. ISBN 978-0-8317-0302-8.
