= Nan'ao County =

Nan'ao 南澳县 Namao
- County
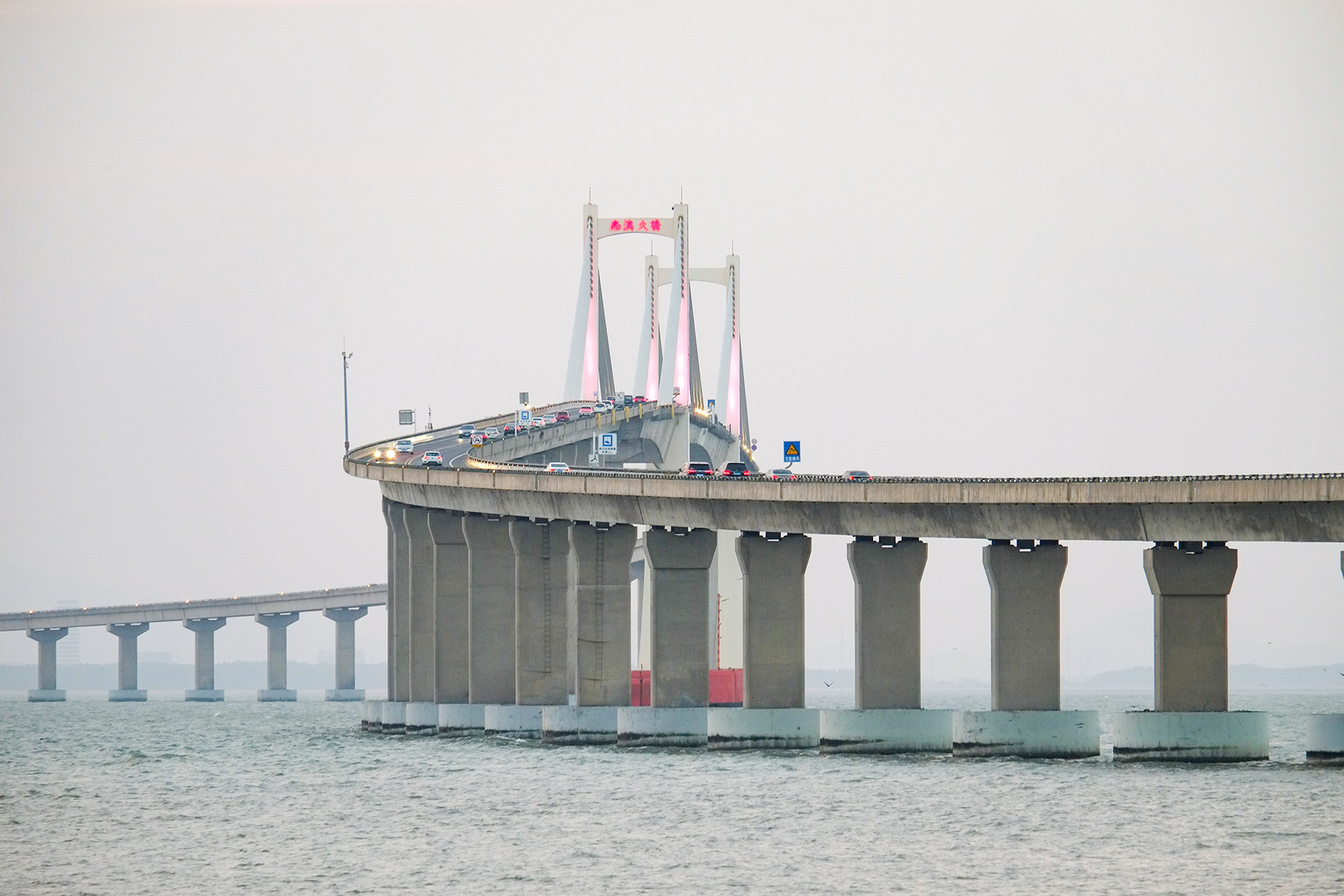
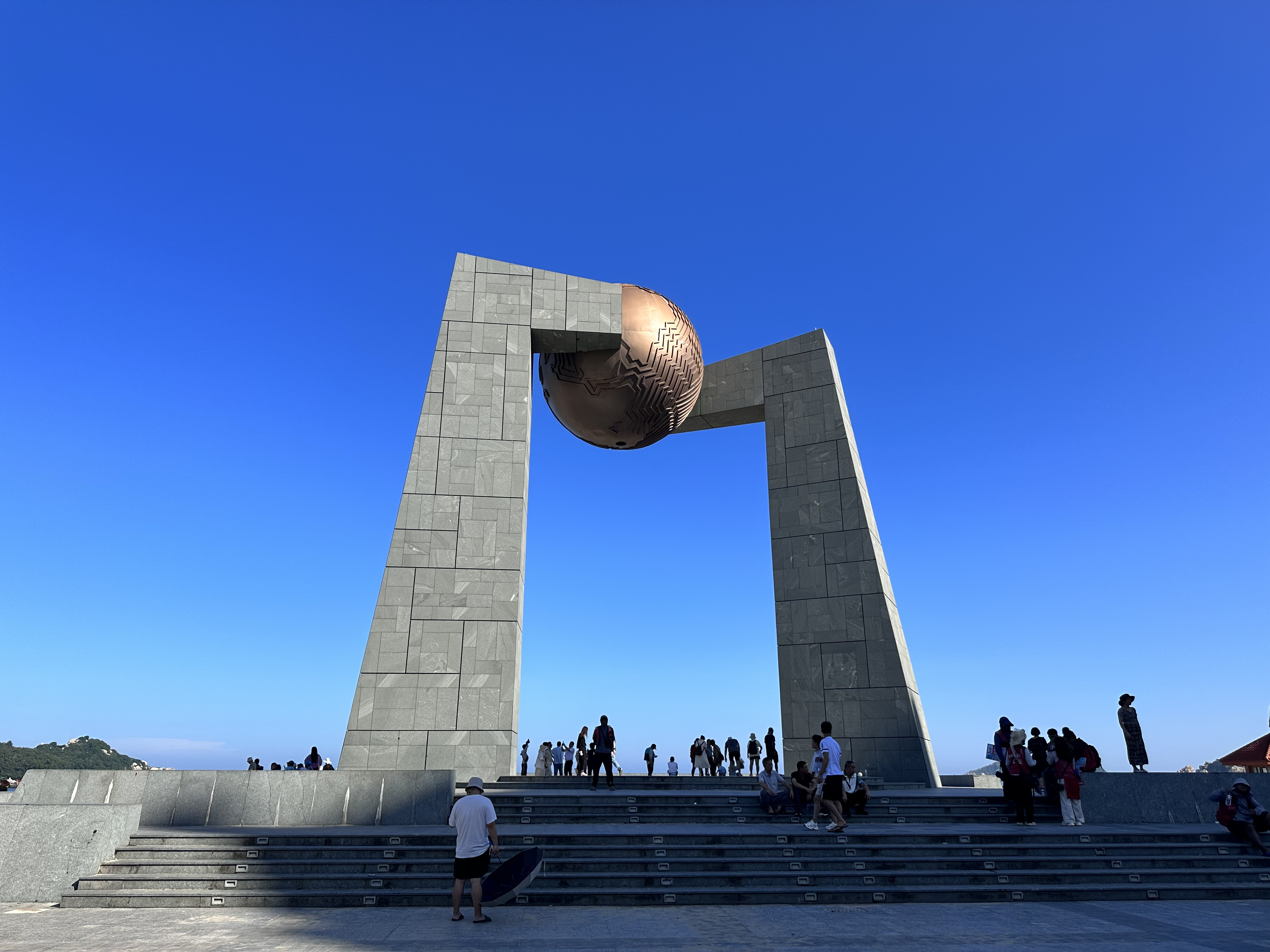
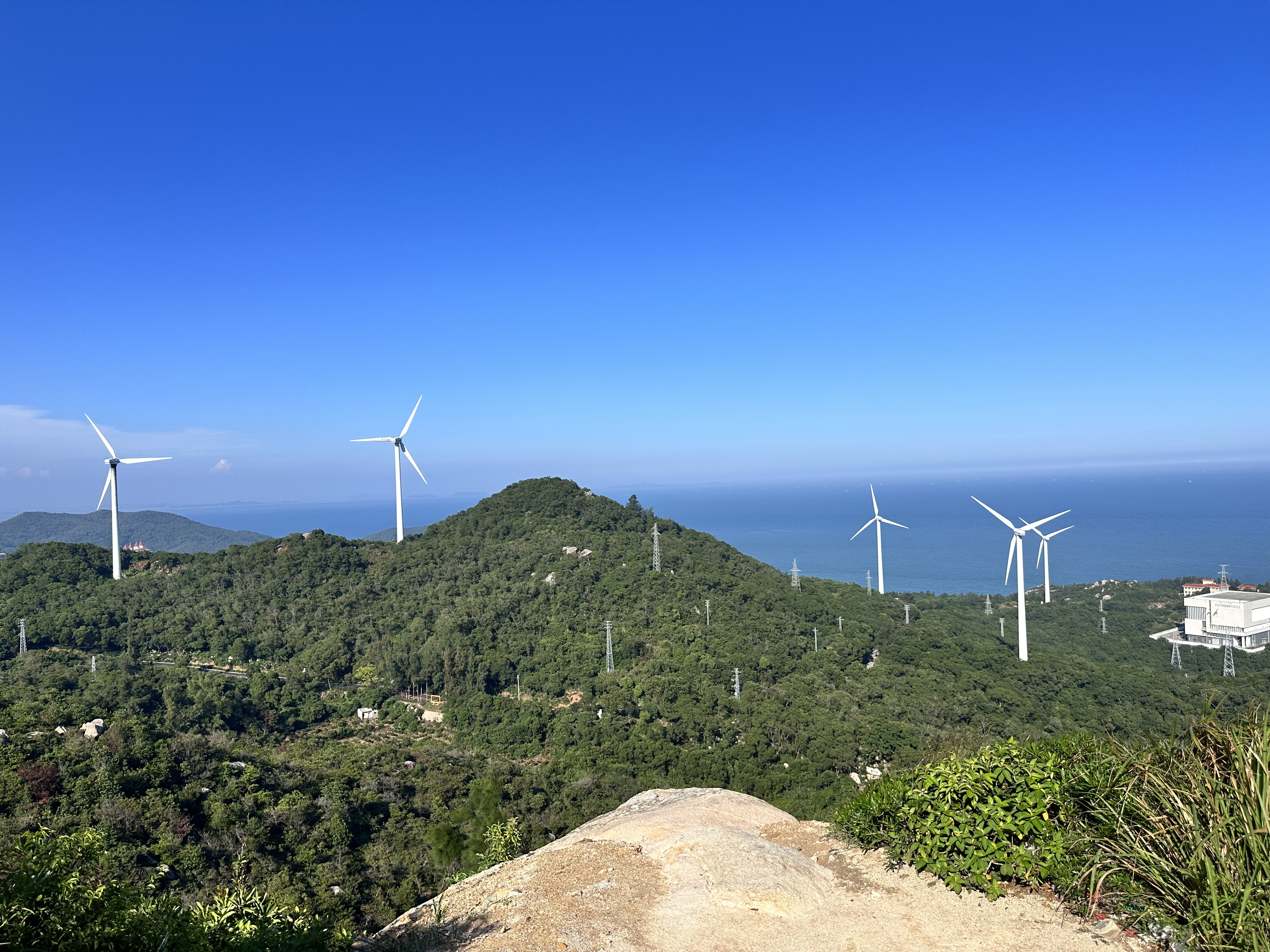
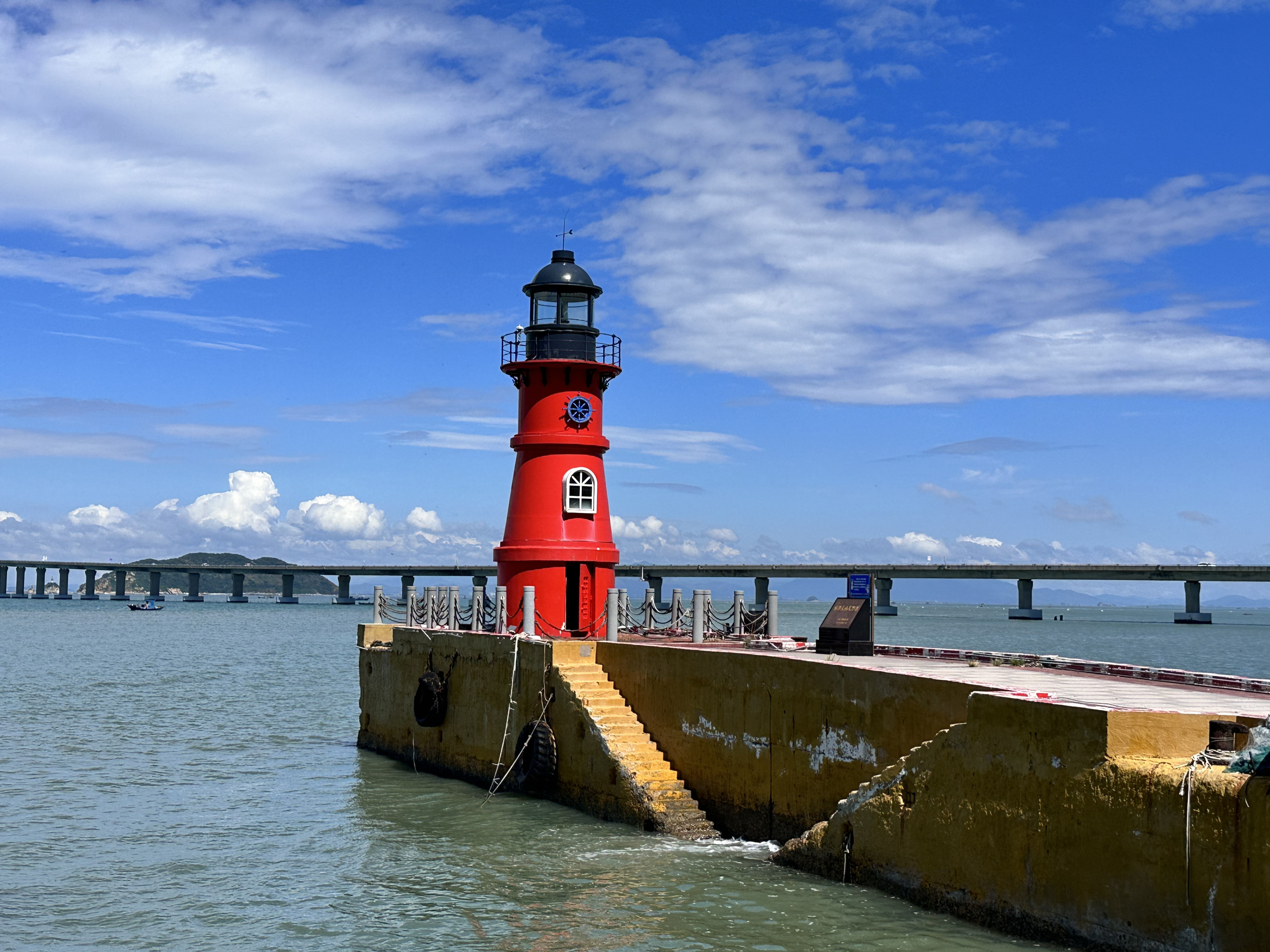
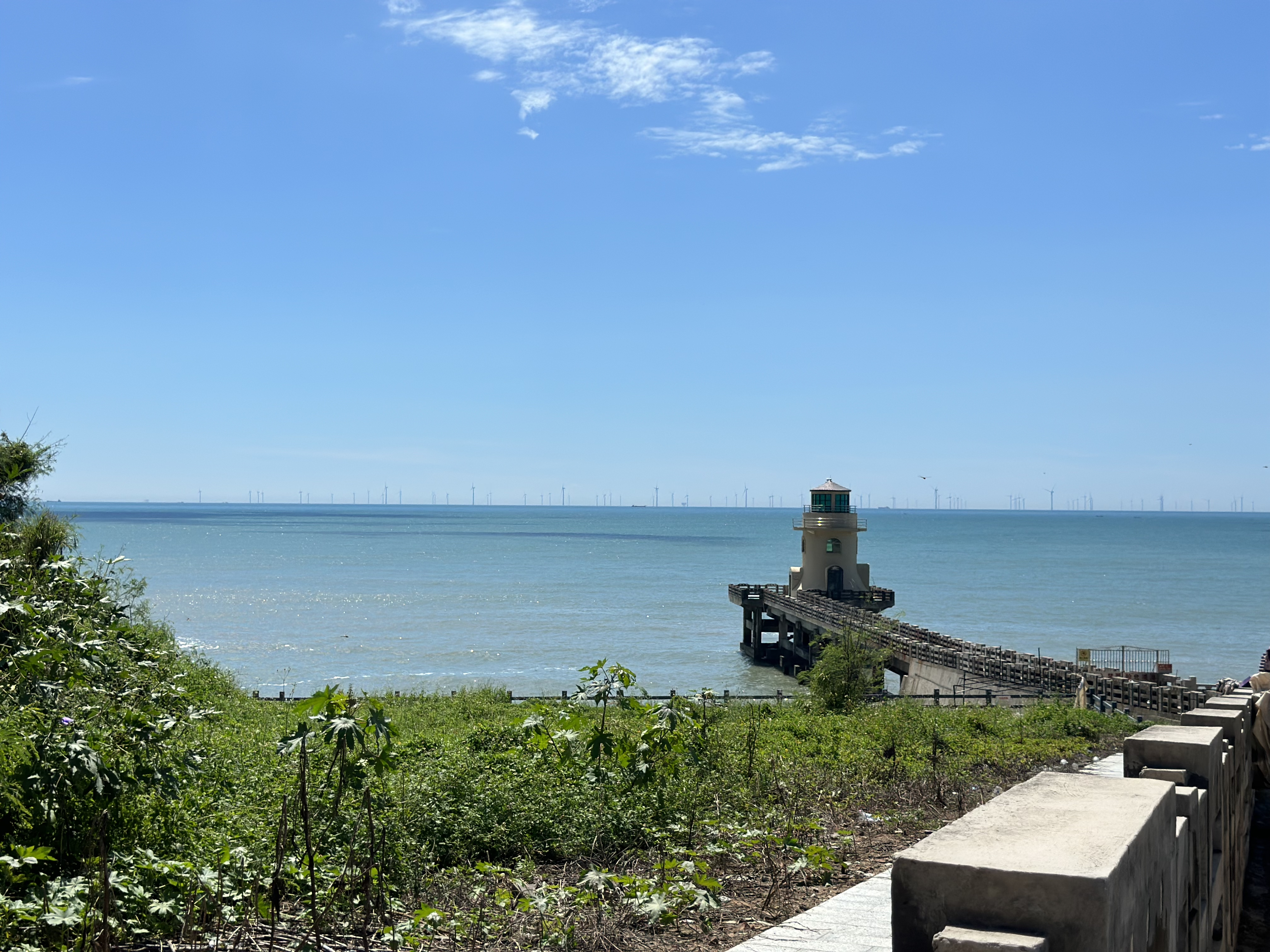
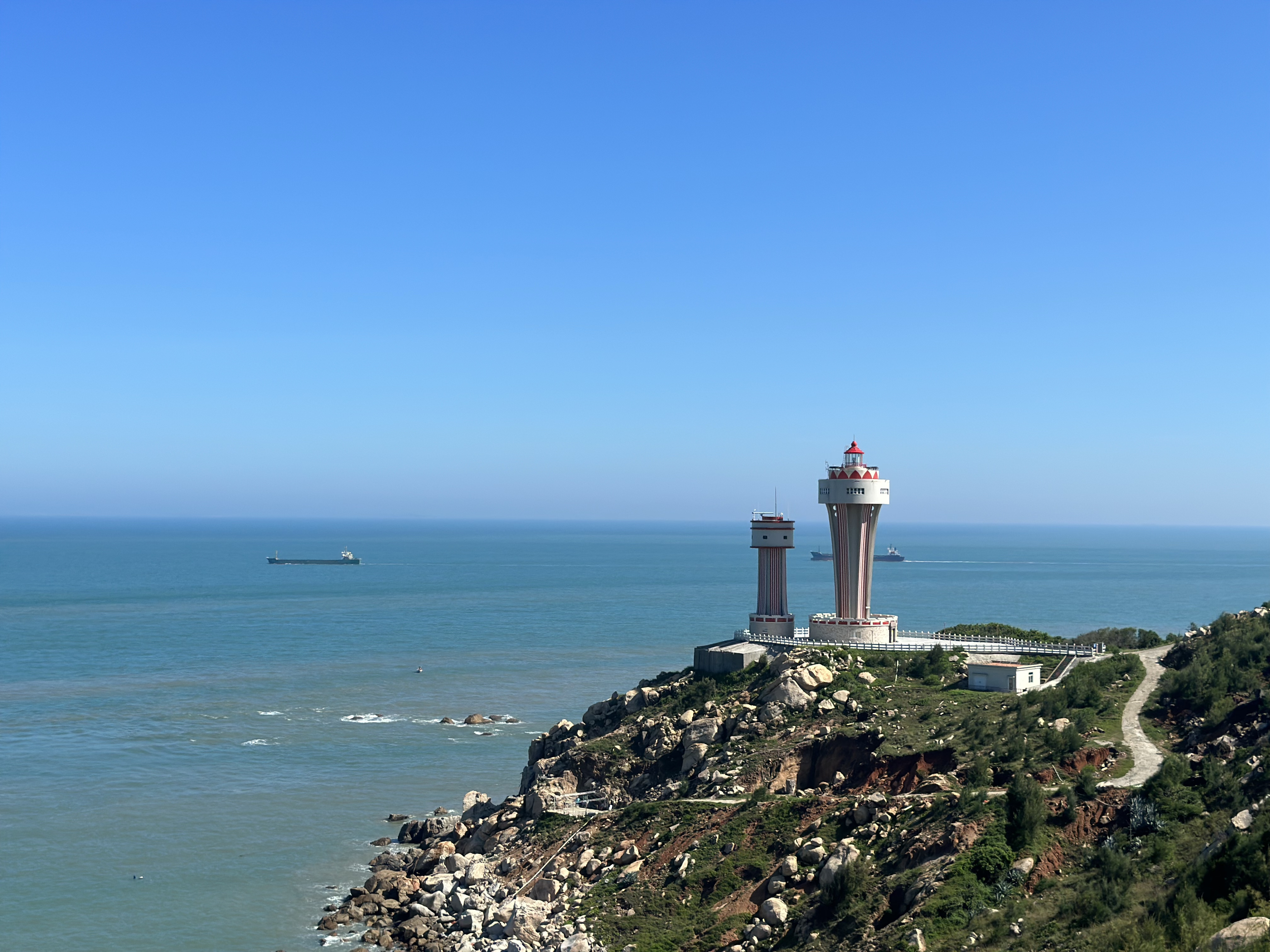
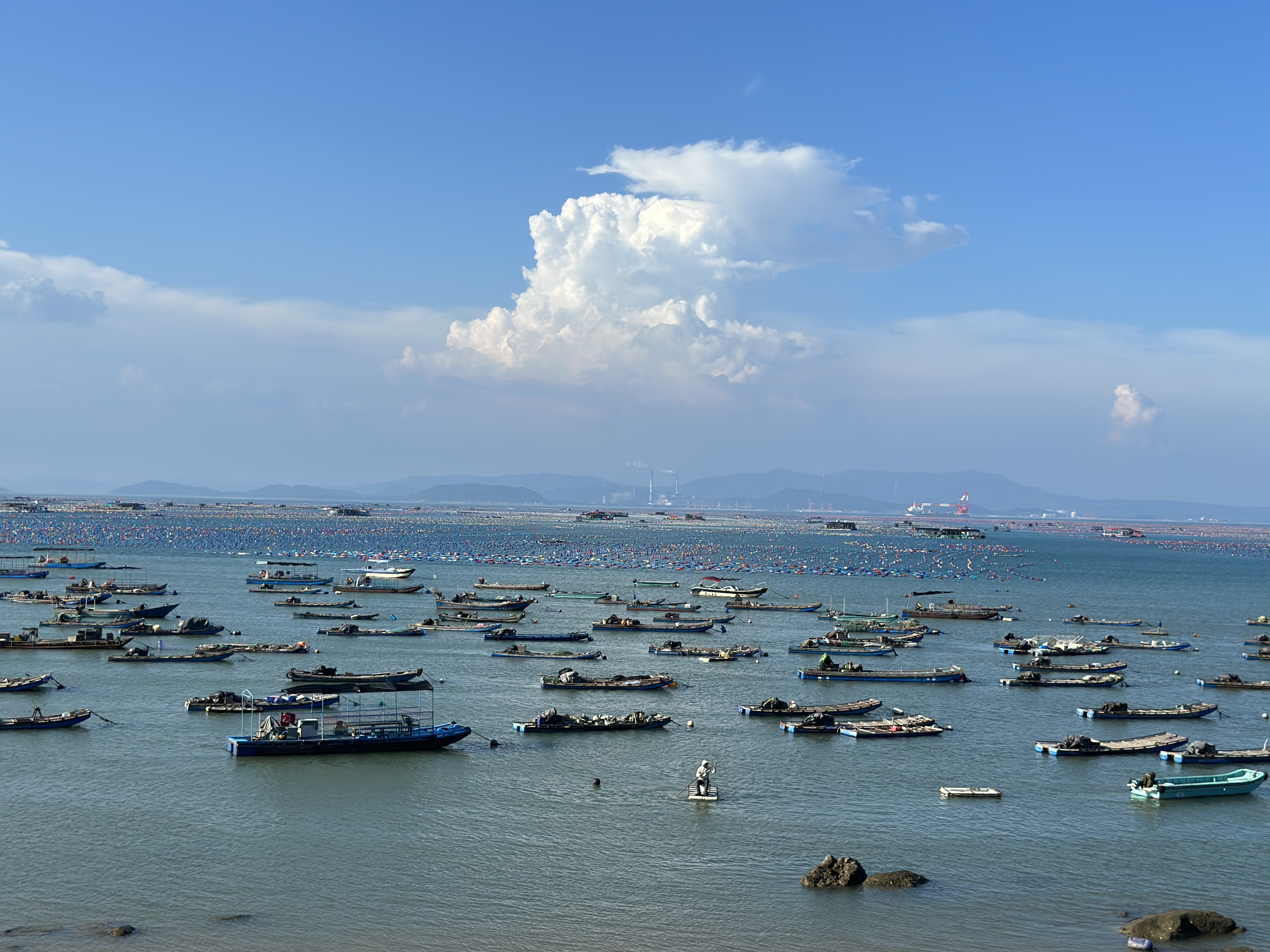
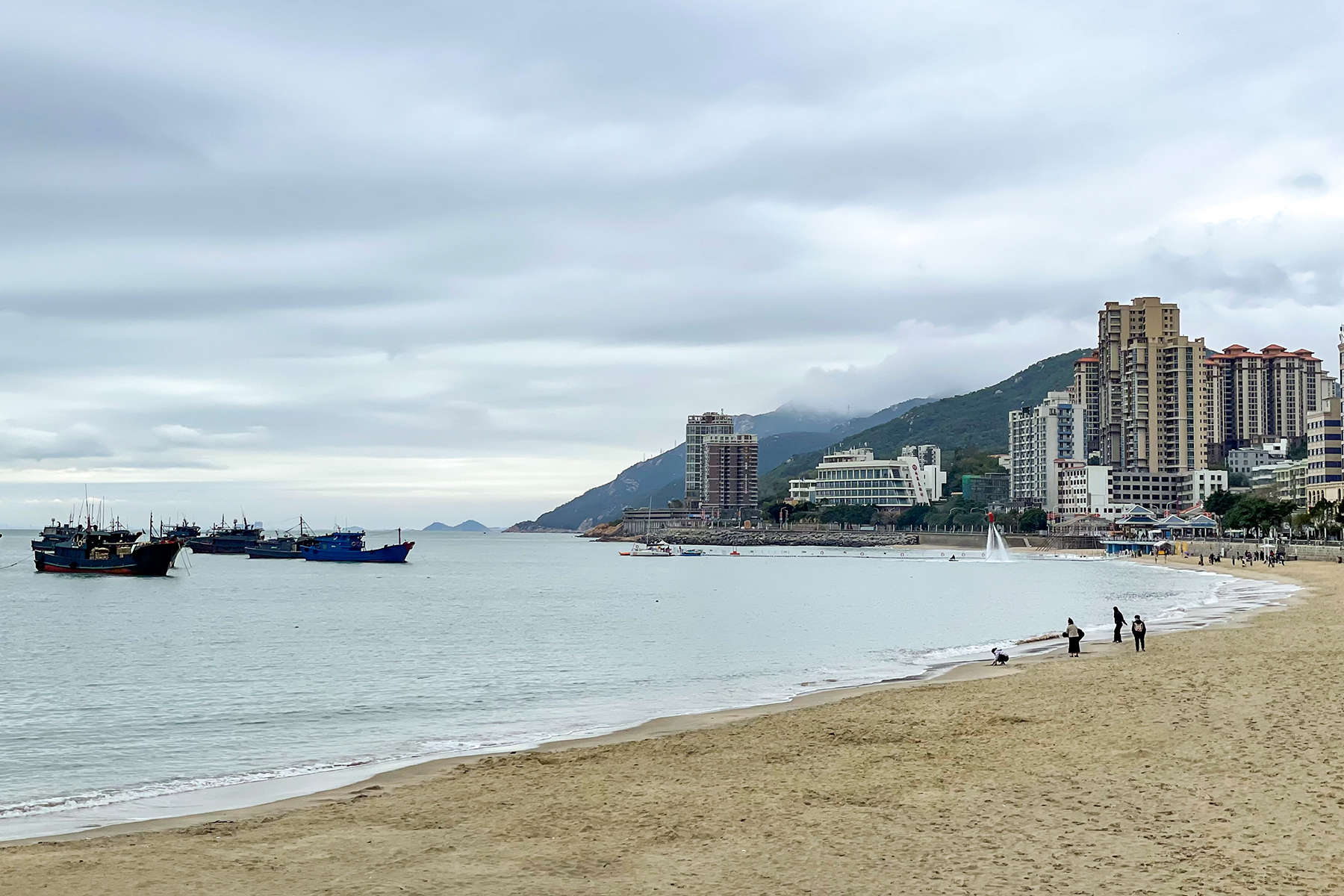
- Nan'ao Bridge Gate of Nature Windmill Hill Changshanwei Lighthouse Qian'ao Bay Lighthouse Sancong Cliff Lighthouse Oyster Farm Qian'ao Beach

- Location of Nan'ao County in Shantou

- Label map of Nan'ao and surrounding islands

- Location in Guangdong
- Coordinates: 23°26′N 117°01′E
- Country: People's Republic of China
- Province: Guangdong
- Prefecture-level city: Shantou

Area
  - Land: 114.74 km^{2} (44.30 sq mi)
  - Water: 4,600 km^{2} (1,800 sq mi)

Population (2020 census)
  - Total: 64,429
  - Density: 561.52/km^{2} (1,454.3/sq mi)
- Time zone: UTC+8 (China Standard)

Nan'ao
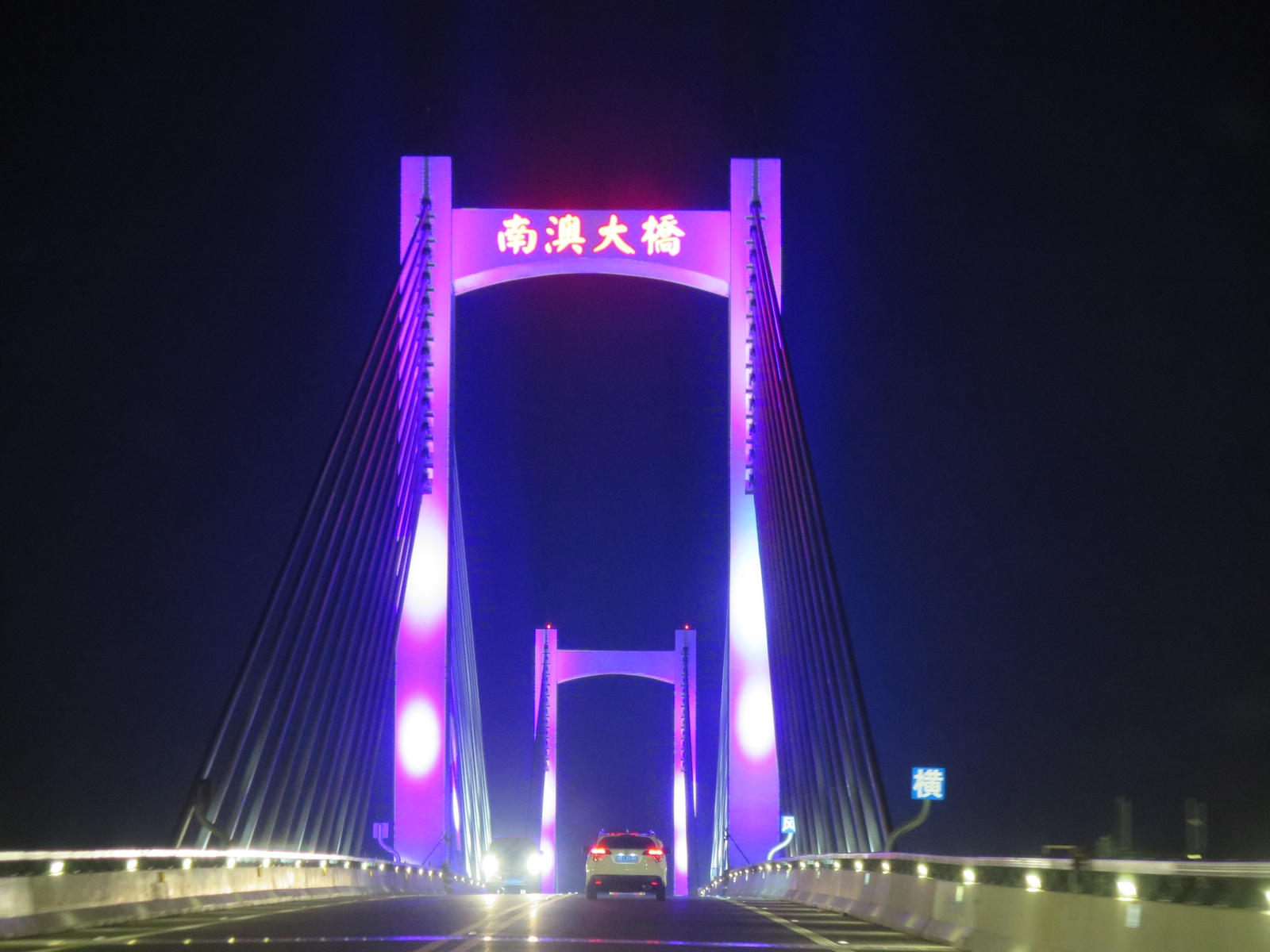
- Nan'ao Bridge
- Chinese: 南澳
- Postal: Namoa
Transcriptions
Standard Mandarin
- Hanyu Pinyin: Nán'ào
- Wade–Giles: Nan-ao

Nan'ao (simplified Chinese: 南澳县; traditional Chinese: 南澳縣; pinyin: Nán'ào Xiàn), formerly romanized Namoa, is an island and county of the prefecture-level city of Shantou in Guangdong Province, China. The county spans a land area of 114.74 square kilometres (44.30 mi^{2}), and sea area of 4,600 square kilometres (1,800 mi^{2}). As of 2020, the county had a permanent population of approximately 64,429.

== History ==
Since ancient times, Nan'ao has been an important and necessary transit station for marine trade along the southeast coast of China and has been known as the "land of mutual market at sea".

There have been human activities on Nan'ao island since the Neolithic Age, dating back to approximately 6000 BCE. Archeological sites indicate the island was home to a Neolithic people known today as the Xiangshan culture (Chinese: 象山文化; pinyin: Xiàngshān Wénhuà). Additionally, the Dongkengzi Shang and Zhou culture site located in Nan'ao provides evidence of ancient human inhabitation.

Nan'ao belonged to Nanyue during its existence.

Nan'ao was incorporated into the Han dynasty's territory and was administered under the jurisdiction of Jieyang County, Nanhai Commandery.

During the Ming and Qing dynasties, the central government dispatched 158 military officers and deputy officers to Nan'ao. In 1575, Ming military commanders incorporated Nan'ao, dividing the island between Chaozhou Fu and Zhangzhou Fu. In 1685, Qing officials further reinforced the island. The former site of the Nan'ao General Headquarters still exists and has become an important cultural tourist attraction. In 1732, the island was organized as a ting.

In the first year of the Republic of China (1912), the island was reorganized as Nan'ao County. The island fell to the Communists on 3 March 1950. Communist forces established a local government on June 1, 1950.

== Geography ==
Nan'ao County is part of the prefecture-level city of Shantou in Guangdong Province, China. It chiefly rests on Nan'ao Island, which covers 111.73 square kilometers (43.14 mi^{2}), but also includes 35 other nearby islands. Altogether, it occupies 114.74 square kilometers (44.30 mi^{2}) of land and 4,600 square kilometers (1,800 mi^{2}) of sea. It is the only island county in Guangdong.

The southern coast of Nan'ao island forms part of the southern boundary of the Taiwan Strait, and it is only 7 nautical miles (13 km; 8.1 mi) from the Pacific international transport route.

=== Climate ===
Since the island is located on the Tropic of Cancer, it has subtropical monsoon climate and marine climate, characterised by long, humid, sunny summer and short, mild winter.

The annual average temperature is between 20 and 22 °C (68 and 72 °F), which is slightly higher in coastal and low-lying areas, and lower in mountainous areas. The coolest month is February. From mid-February to the first ten days of April, the temperature goes up gradually, reaching over 22 °C in the second ten days of April. In mid-July, the temperature reaches 27.6 °C (81.7 °F). It gradually decreases from mid-September and drops below 22 °C in early November. In general, the highest temperature is 32–34 °C (90–93 °F) and the lowest is 4–6 °C (39–43 °F).

Climate data for Nan'ao, elevation 8 m (26 ft), (1991–2020 normals, extremes 1981–2021)
Month	Jan	Feb	Mar	Apr	May	Jun	Jul	Aug	Sep	Oct	Nov	Dec	Year
Record high °C (°F)	26.4 (79.5)	28.2 (82.8)	27.7 (81.9)	30.2 (86.4)	32.9 (91.2)	35.3 (95.5)	37.8 (100.0)	35.4 (95.7)	35.3 (95.5)	33.4 (92.1)	30.6 (87.1)	27.8 (82.0)	37.8 (100.0)
Mean daily maximum °C (°F)	18.4 (65.1)	18.8 (65.8)	21.0 (69.8)	24.4 (75.9)	27.7 (81.9)	29.6 (85.3)	30.9 (87.6)	31.0 (87.8)	30.6 (87.1)	27.9 (82.2)	24.5 (76.1)	20.3 (68.5)	25.4 (77.8)
Daily mean °C (°F)	14.6 (58.3)	15.0 (59.0)	17.3 (63.1)	21.0 (69.8)	24.6 (76.3)	27.0 (80.6)	27.9 (82.2)	27.9 (82.2)	27.2 (81.0)	24.5 (76.1)	21.0 (69.8)	16.7 (62.1)	22.1 (71.7)
Mean daily minimum °C (°F)	11.9 (53.4)	12.4 (54.3)	14.5 (58.1)	18.3 (64.9)	22.0 (71.6)	24.8 (76.6)	25.3 (77.5)	25.2 (77.4)	24.4 (75.9)	21.7 (71.1)	18.1 (64.6)	13.9 (57.0)	19.4 (66.9)
Record low °C (°F)	2.0 (35.6)	5.5 (41.9)	4.4 (39.9)	8.1 (46.6)	14.3 (57.7)	16.9 (62.4)	21.9 (71.4)	22.0 (71.6)	18.0 (64.4)	12.9 (55.2)	6.9 (44.4)	2.5 (36.5)	2.0 (35.6)
Average precipitation mm (inches)	32.7 (1.29)	43.1 (1.70)	73.1 (2.88)	121.4 (4.78)	158.8 (6.25)	234.7 (9.24)	175.9 (6.93)	259.2 (10.20)	132.4 (5.21)	49.4 (1.94)	40.8 (1.61)	40.1 (1.58)	1,361.6 (53.61)
Average precipitation days (≥ 0.1 mm)	5.9	8.5	9.3	11.2	12.8	14.5	11.4	12.4	8.1	3.7	4.3	6.1	108.2
Average relative humidity (%)	73	76	77	80	83	88	87	85	78	70	72	71	78
Mean monthly sunshine hours	161.9	126.3	127.9	133.0	158.5	178.7	250.0	223.5	218.1	230.0	187.5	172.1	2,167.5
Percentage possible sunshine	48	39	34	35	38	44	60	56	60	65	57	52	49
Source: China Meteorological Administration all-time record lowest temperature

== Administrative divisions ==
Nan'ao County administers three towns: Houzhai, Yun'ao, and Shen'ao. These three towns are then divided into 5 residential communities and 41 administrative villages.

== Demographics ==
As of 2019, Nan'ao County had a permanent population of 62,600, who were mostly Han Chinese.

The island is home to the Nan'ao dialect (南澳话; Nán'àohuà), which is part of the broader Teochew dialect. The dialect differs by town, with those in Houzhai speaking similarly to the region of mainland region of Chaochengrao, whereas those in Yun'ao and Shen'ao speak more like dialects heard in Zhangzhou, Quanzhou, and Xiamen.

Owing to the close geographic proximity to Taiwan, as well as close linguistic and cultural connections, the county government estimates that over 100,000 people hailing from Nan'ao County live in Taiwan.

== Economy ==
In 2019, Nan'ao County's gross domestic product reached ¥2.933 billion, its total retail sales of consumer goods was ¥2.854 billion, and the total output value of agriculture, forestry, animal husbandry and fishery was ¥2.34 billion.

As of 2018, the total import and export volume was 99.04 million RMB (US$14,806,579), an increase of 22.8% over 2017. The revenue of public finance budget is 262 million RMB (US$39,169,262), an increase of 13.2% over the previous year, of which the tax revenue is 188 million RMB (US$28,106,188), an increase of 40.8% over 2017. The total investment in fixed assets is 2.030 billion RMB (US$299,450,503), an increase of 13.4% over 2017. The GDP reached 2.466 billion RMB (US$368,669,466), an increase of 5% over 2017. The total retail sales of consumer goods were 2.662 billion RMB (US$397,556,390), an increase of 8.9% over 2017. The increase value of the tertiary industry is 930 million RMB(US$138,890,850), an increase of 5.7% over 2017. The total agricultural output value was 2.19 billion yuan (US$327,065,550), an increase of 4.2% over 2017.

Since the opening of Nanao Bridge, the local economy has been booming, especially in tourism. According to official statistics, the total tourists reached 5.93 million in 2017, an increase of 10.5% compared with the same period last year, and the total tourism revenue increased by 20.6% compared with the same period last year.

Tourism comprehensive income (2014–2018)
Year	2014	2015	2016	2017	2018
Tourism comprehensive income (US$)	62,829,900	182,505,900	216,912,750	261,641,655	310,559,220
Year-on-year growth (%)	27.2	187.4	19.3	20.62	18.6

== Infrastructure ==
=== Nan'ao Bridge ===
Nan'ao Bridge, a cross-sea bridge connecting Chenghai District and Nan'ao County, was officially opened to traffic on January 1, 2015. The bridge starts at Laiwuwei (莱芜围) in Chenghai District, and ends at Changshanwei (长山尾), Nan'ao County, which is connected with a loop highway which circumferences the island. Prior to the completion of Nan'ao Bridge, those who wished to travel between Nan'ao and the mainland had to use a ferry, which would not run in the event of strong winds or thick fog.

The route of the bridge is 11.08 kilometres (6.88 mi) long, of which the total length of the bridge is 9.341 kilometres (5.804 mi), and the total length of the connecting line is 1.739 kilometres (1.081 mi). The maximum speed of traffic traveling along the bridge is 60 kilometres per hour (37 mph). The width of the road is 12 metres (39 ft), and the width of the bridge is 11 metres (36 ft).

Cycles, motorcycles and pedestrians are banned from using the bridge.

=== Wind power ===
Located in the central part of the east peninsula, Nan'ao Wind Farm is the largest island wind farm in Asia. The local government devotes much attention to the development of wind energy resources and wind power, a renewable and pollution-free new energy source. Nine wind farms have been built in the central and eastern mountainous areas of the island.

Nan'ao Wind Farm is the first project in China that realizes large-scale wind-PV complementary power generation, and creates the precedent for China's development and utilization of renewable energies. The towers may be seen when driving up the mountain roads to the turbine site.

== Attractions ==
Nan'ao is the only island-wide AAAA-level tourist area in China.

=== Historic interest ===
==== The Song Dynasty Well ====
In 1276 (during the Southern Song dynasty), the Ming emperor fled to Nan'ao in order to escape the pursuit of the Yuan army. The local residents excavated three wells to provide water for the emperor, ministers, soldiers and their horses, respectively named Dragon Well, Tiger Well and Horse Well. Over the past 700 years, the Southern Song dynasty well has appeared and disappeared from time to time. Although it is only 10 meters away from the sea, the water inside is pure and sweet.

==== Nan'ao General Headquarters ====
Nan'ao General Headquarters is the only island-level administrative General Headquarters in China. Because of Nan'ao's strategic geographical location, it has always been an important military site since ancient times. During the Ming dynasty, the central government sent troops here and set up a vice-general office, which was then upgraded to a General Headquarters during the Qing dynasty. Inside the headquarters there is a museum which records the history of coastal defense here.

==== Shen'ao Ancient City Park ====
In Kingshan village of Shen'ao town, there is an ancient wall about 5 meters high and more than 40 meters long, which is the only section of the Ming dynasty wall left in Nan'ao. It records its important history of coastal defense. The wall was repaired and renovated in 2015, around which an ancient city park was built. Inside the park there are various species of trees, including nanmu trees, peach trees, silver fir, and Spathodea campanulata.

==== Xiongzhen Pass ====
Xiongzhen Pass, located in the junction of Yun'ao Town and Shen'ao town, has been strategically situated from ancient times. It is included in the Chinese Famous Passes List as Shanhai Pass and Jiayu Pass of the Great Wall. The pass, which was built in 1585 during the Ming dynasty, has been repaired and expanded over the centuries. The existing wall, built in 1982, is 24 meters long, 7 meters wide and 5 meters high.

==== Treasure Island ====
To the northeast of Nan'ao Island, there is a small island not far from the coast, with a total area of less than 1,000 square meters, known as "Treasure Island." It is believed to have been the place where the Ming dynasty pirate, Wu Ping, hid his treasures.

According to legend, during the Jiajing period of the Ming dynasty, because of the crisis of the government, official corruption, financial crisis and the severe frontier crisis, the people lived a miserable life. The pirate Wu Ping built a camp in Shen'ao bay, which eventually became Wu Ping's sphere of influence; nowadays the village is still named after him.

In 1565 Wu Ping was defeated by the general who was sent by the imperial court to Nan'ao. Wu Ping hid all his treasures in the small island now known as Treasure Island, and then jumped into the sea to commit suicide. After the death of Wu Ping, there was a saying circulating among the local residents that describes the hiding place: "underwater at low tide, surface at high tide". The meaning of this sentence in local dialect is: "when the tide is high, the land cannot be immersed by water, but when tide ebbs the land is flooded", suggesting that it should be a place with fresh water. The location of the buried treasure remains unknown.

=== Nature reserves ===
==== Qing'ao Bay ====
Located at the easternmost end of Nan'ao Island, lying on the Tropic of Cancer, Qing'ao Bay is the first place in Guangdong Province to see sunrise.

In recent years, Qing'ao Bay has been developed as an important area for creation of national-level ecological demonstration zones and national 4A-level tourist zones. Coastal garden construction, ecological environment construction of sewage treatment project, beach comprehensive treatment, hotel domestic sewage discharge standard, mountain spring water source protection, and sea area environmental improvement have been developed a lot, all of which ensure the effective management and protection of local natural ecosystems such as bays, rocky banks, beaches, streams, gardens and vegetation.

The Qing'ao bay corridor was built on the southern beach reefs of Qing'ao Bay. Pavilions have been constructed overlooking the sea.

==== Nan'ao Yellow Flowers National Forest Park ====
Located in the west of Nanao Island, with a total area of 13.73 km^{2}, the park is an ecological park integrating natural landscape, cultural landscape and rejuvenating treatment. In 1992, the Ministry of Forestry of China approved the original Yellow Flower Mountain Forest Farm as the "Island National Forest Park". Here there is the Dajian mountain, which is known as the "First Peak in Shantou", with an elevation of 588.1 meters. It is the only island national forest park in China. The erosion of sea breeze, sunshine and rainwater for a long time cause weathering of rocks, which is called granite landform. A large number of Taiwan Acacia trees are planted here, yellow flowers blossom in spring, hence the name Yellow Flower Mountain.

The park is rich in natural resources and cultural landscape, the forest coverage is over 90%. There are over 1440 tropical and subtropical plants in 102 families, including Podocarpus Nagi, which is called living fossil, fine-leaved grapes, and boxwood plants. It has more than 40 kinds of national protected wild animals such as Plumed Egret, pythons and Cyclemys trifasciata (money turtles).

==== Migratory Bird Nature Reserve ====
Nanao migratory bird nature reserve is named Paradise of Birds, There are more than 90 species of birds here, including 46 species of migratory birds under the Sino-Japanese Conservation Agreement, 3 species of national first-class protected birds, and 5 species of second-class protected birds.

Every year during June to September, thousands of marine migratory birds gather here.

==== Egret Park ====
Egret Park is an important habitat for egrets. Fronting water and with a hill at the back, the park has a dense growth of trees. Every February and March the park becomes a sea of blossoming rape plants.

=== Villages ===
==== Back garden village ====
The Back Garden village is located to the north of Guolao Mountain which is in the central part of Nan'ao Island, with an altitude of 400–500 meters and a forest coverage rate of 90%. It has a pleasant climate, no bitter cold in winter or torrid heat in summer. Because of its high peaks, fertile land and dense forests, it is suitable for the development of planting and aquaculture, especially tea planting.

==== Fishing village ====
The fishing village is located in the Lieyu bay of Shen'ao town. The waters here are wide and calm. It used to be an important ferry place of the ancient maritime Silk Road and ancient battlefield. Nowadays, it has become a seafood farm, where groupers, abalones, pearls, seaweed, shellfish and other valuable seafood are cultivated.

=== Viewpoints and amenities ===
==== Maritime Silk Road Square ====
The Maritime Silk Road Square (Haisi square), which completed its construction before the Spring Festival of 2018, is an important part of the Blue Bay Rehabilitation Project of the local government. It now serves as a sitting-out area with sea views, for local residents and tourists. The statues on the square show the cultural connotation of this island, which used to be a node of the maritime silk road in ancient times.

From the square there are walking routes along the coastal corridor to the Beisha Bay and the Qianjiang Bay.

==== Sailing Square ====
The sailing square, which is the first sightseeing spot after entering the island from the Nan'ao bridge, has now become a combination of parking lot, sitting-out area, coastal sightseeing point and commercial street. With a view of the sea-crossing bridge, it is popular with photographers.

==== Gate of Nature ====
The Gate of Nature is located on the Square of the Tropic of Cancer in Qing'ao bay. The design of the tower evolved from the Chinese character "door". The radius of the sphere is 3.21 meters (corresponding to March 21, Spring Equinox), the cantilever length is 6.22 meters (corresponding to the summer solstice on June 22), the height of the tower is 12.22 meters (corresponding to the winter solstice on December 22), and the inclination angle of the two portal pillars corresponds to 23.50 North latitude. Every summer solstice at noon, when the sun shines directly on the Tropic of Cancer, the shadow will pass through the central tube of the upper sphere, and the sun shines directly on the center of the platform.

==== Turtle Lake ====
The Turtle Lake is under the Eagle Rocky Hill. The attractions nearby are: a stone-carving area where there are more than 1,000 works by famous calligraphers from all over the world, Anti-Japanese Memorial Hall, Educational Youth Hall, Dajian Mountain sightseeing Pavilion, Giant Stone Turtle Sculpture, Ancient Banyan Tree, and Changshangwei Qing Dynasty Emplacement site.

==== Other ====
The Southward Pavilion and Auspicious Cloud Square are viewing points. The Tianzai Geopark displays granite landforms typical of the local coast, and rocks of different shapes.

Dajian Mountain, 588.1 meters above sea level, is the highest peak in Shantou and may be climbed.

== Transportation ==
The nearest airport is Jieyang Chaoshan International Airport, and the nearest high speed rail stations are Chaoshan Railway Station and Shantou Railway station.

=== Driving routes ===
- Shantou East Coast Avenue or Chenghai 336 provincial road——Nan'ao Bridge——Zhongxing road (N) or National forest park (E) or Coast road (S)

=== Bus routes ===
==== From Shantou downtown ====
- 161A/B Green dream Wetland ecological park (Lumengshidigongyuan, Shantou)——Big Roundabout of Hilltop (Shanding dayuan, Nan'ao)
- 105 Xidi Wharf (Xidi, Shantou)——Big Roundabout of Gongqian Village (Gongqian dayuan, Nan'ao)

==== From Chaoyang district, Shantou city ====
- 314 Gurao bus terminal——Eastern Ring Road (Huancheng donglu, Nan'ao)

==== From Chenghai district, Shantou city ====
- 203K Chenghai bus terminal——Customhouse of Nan'ao (Haiguan)

==== Local bus trips around the island ====
601, 602.
