= Cunny (disambiguation) =

Cunny is an alternate spelling of cunt.

Cunny may also refer to:

== Persons ==
- Joan Cunny, a 16th-century Englishwoman accused of witchcraft
- John Canoe (died 1725), also known as Jean Cunny, an Akan warrier, the chief of the Ahanta
- Old Cunny (1807–1871, William Cunningham), U.S. bodysnatcher

== Fictional characters ==
- Cunny, a fictional character from The Pink Panther
- Cunny Charlie, a fictional character from the 2015 film Jane Got a Gun
- King Cunny, Aliases of Gaemon Palehair, a character from A Song of Ice and Fire

== Other uses ==
- Cunny Creek, Tasmania, Australia; a creek on the Derwent Valley Railway (Tasmania)
- Leporidae, the rabbits and hares, from the medieval English word "cunny", "coney", "cony"

== See also ==
- Cuny (surname)
- CUNY, NYC, NYS, USA
- Cuni (disambiguation)
- Cuney, Cherokee County, Texas, USA
- Norris Wright Cuney (1846–1898), U.S. politician
- Cune (disambiguation)
- Cun (disambiguation)
