= Byron McCandless =

U.S. Navy officer (1881–1957)

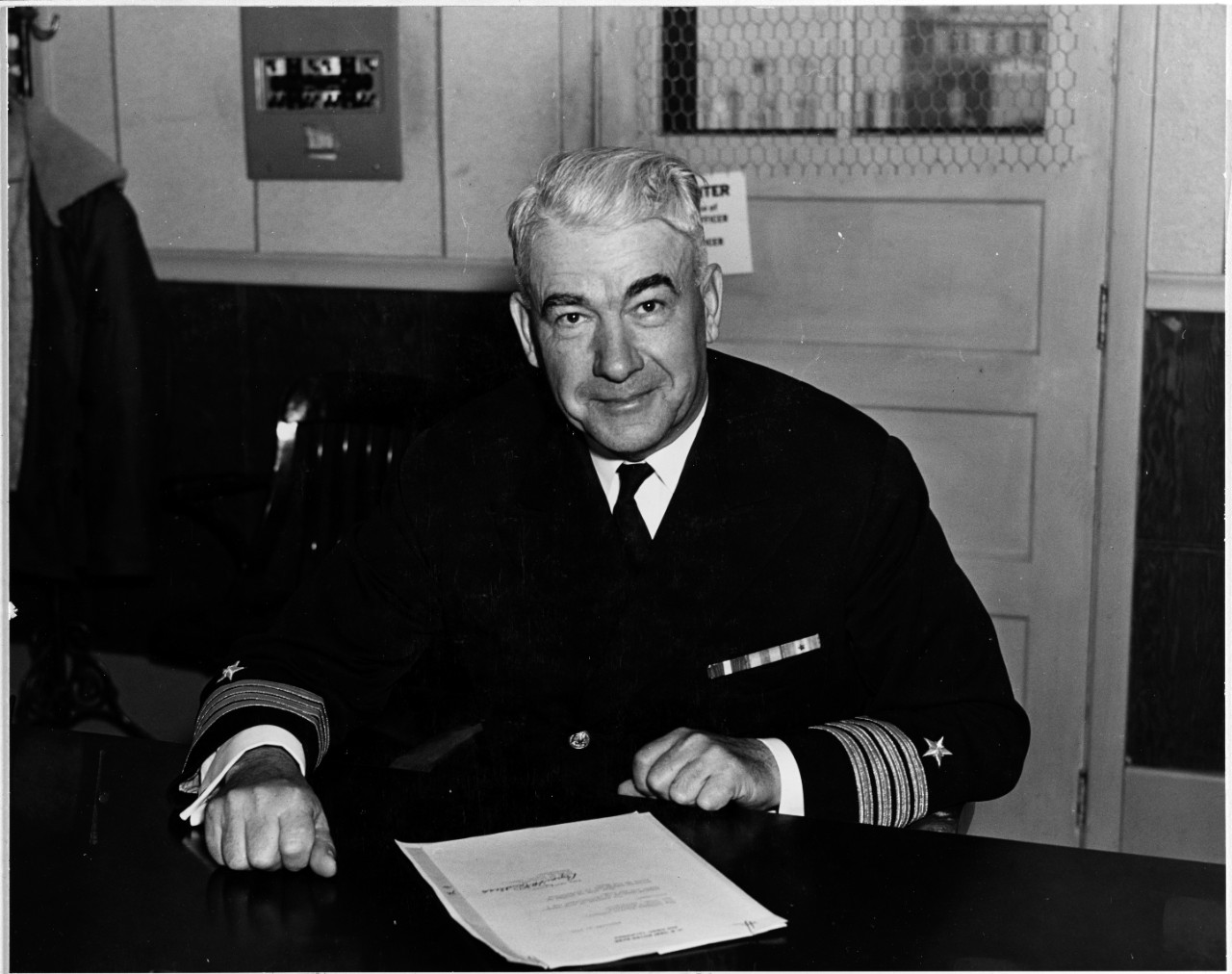
- Byron McCandless in 1941
- Born: September 5, 1881; Endicott, Nebraska, U.S.
- Died: May 30, 1967 (aged 85); Mariposa, California, U.S.
- Relatives: Father of Rear Admiral Bruce McCandless, Medal of Honor recipient Grandfather of Bruce McCandless II, NASA astronaut
- Military career
- Allegiance: United States of America
- Branch: United States Navy
- Service years: 1905–1946
- Rank: Commodore
- Conflicts: World War I World War II
- Awards: Navy Cross; Legion of Merit

Commodore Byron McCandless (September 5, 1881 – May 30, 1967) was a longtime U.S. Navy officer who was awarded the Navy Cross during World War I and the Legion of Merit during World War II. He was also prominent in the field of vexillology (the study of flags), and helped design two separate versions of the flag of the president of the United States. He was the father of Bruce McCandless, also a naval officer, and the grandfather of NASA astronaut Bruce McCandless II. Commodore McCandless was later promoted to the rank of Rear Admiral on the retired list.

== Family and early life ==
Byron McCandless was born in Endicott, Nebraska. His grandfather was David McCanles, who was killed by Wild Bill Hickok in 1861 at the Rock Creek Station, Nebraska shoot-out. His father was Julius McCandless (born 1851), who later moved his family to Florence, Colorado, where he operated a hardware store. (Florence had been founded by one of Julius' uncles, James McCandless, and named for one of James' daughters.)

Byron McCandless attended the Colorado School of Mines, and in 1899 played one season as quarterback for the University of Colorado football team. He later went to the United States Naval Academy where he graduated in 1905. He married Velma May Kitson (a daughter of May Kitson) on September 29, 1909. Their son Bruce was born in Washington, D.C., on August 12, 1911. The couple also had a daughter named Velma, born in Brooklyn, New York, on June 4, 1914.

== Naval career ==
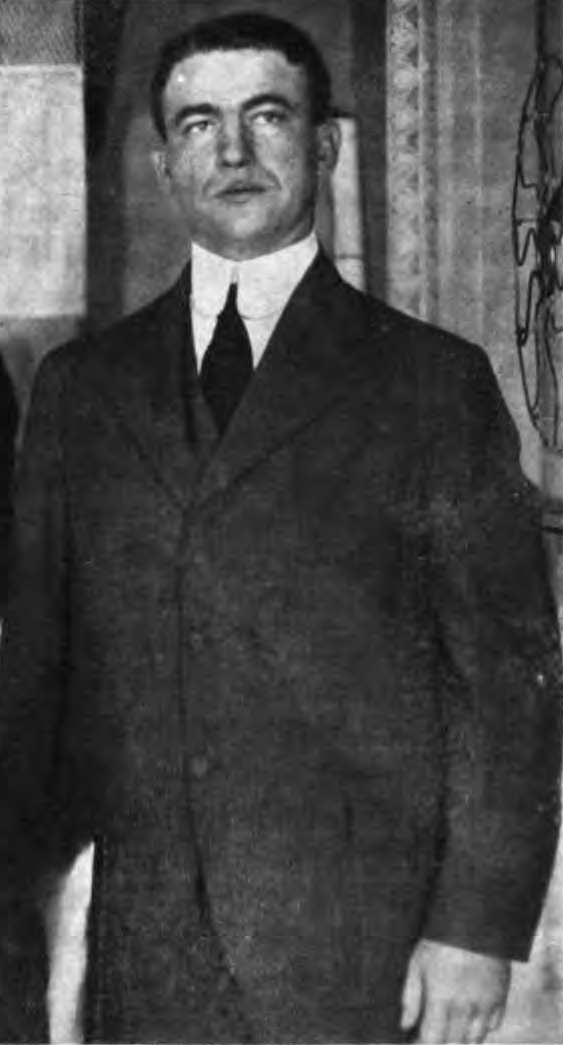
McCandless in 1915.

Following his graduation from the United States Naval Academy in 1905, McCandless sailed with the Great White Fleet on the USS Maine. He was a gunnery and turret officer, and later became the flag lieutenant and aide to Rear Admiral Charles J. Badger, the commander of the Atlantic Fleet. When Admiral William S. Benson became the first Chief of Naval Operations in 1915, he chose McCandless to be on his three-person staff. Later, McCandless also became an aide to Secretary of the Navy Josephus Daniels.

During World War I, McCandless commanded the destroyer USS Caldwell, and was awarded the Navy Cross. His citation read:

For distinguished service in the line of his profession as commanding officer of the USS Caldwell, engaged in the important, exacting and hazardous duty of patrolling the waters infested with enemy submarines and mines, in escorting and protecting vitally important convoys of troops and supplies through these waters, and in offensive and defensive action, vigorously and unremittingly prosecuted against all forms of enemy naval activity.

After the war, McCandless was the executive officer on the battleship USS Kansas. He later commanded the USS Parrott from 1921 to 1923, the oiler USS Brazos in 1927–28, and the cruiser USS Raleigh. McCandless also commanded Destroyer Division 30 and served as the Operations Officer for Destroyer Squadrons of the Scouting Fleet.

McCandless attended the Naval War College, then became the Director of the Training Division in the Navy's Bureau of Navigation, and later headed the Branch Hydrographic Office in Boston. After completing another course at the Naval War College, he served as the Chief of Staff for Destroyers, Battle Force, from 1935 to 1937.

McCandless became the commanding officer of the Destroyer Base, San Diego, in January 1937. He was transferred to the retired list on June 30, 1940, but remained on active duty and in command. He oversaw an expansion in scope of the base, adding fleet training schools and an amphibious force training unit, and accordingly it was renamed the Repair Base, San Diego, in 1942. Helped by the addition of several floating dry docks, between 1943 and 1945 the base performed conversion, overhaul, maintenance and battle damage repair to more than 5,000 ships. He remained the commander until the end of the war, leaving on September 8, 1945. For his service at the base, McCandless was awarded the Legion of Merit. He retired on September 25, 1946.

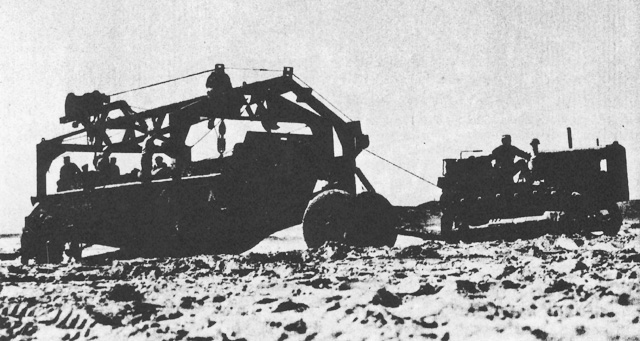
The jeheemy, invented by McCandless

During his career, McCandless made several inventions. One of them was the "Jeheemy", an apparatus used to salvage landing craft swamped and stranded on invasion beachheads. It consisted of portable crane hauled along the beach by a tractor. McCandless also patented several other inventions, including a camera and other photographic equipment, a projection system, and a portable lamp.

== Vexillology ==
McCandless developed in interest in flags, a field later called vexillology, and in 1917 was described by National Geographic Magazine as the "foremost flag expert of the United States Government and probably the leading authority in the world on flag usages among maritime nations". McCandless authored almost the entire October 1917 issue of National Geographic, their "Flag Number", depicting nearly 1200 world flags in color and including a history of the American flag.

In 1923, McCandless discovered the 1779 Dutch sketches of the Serapis flag in the records of the Chicago Historical Society, removing any doubt as to what the flags actually looked like.

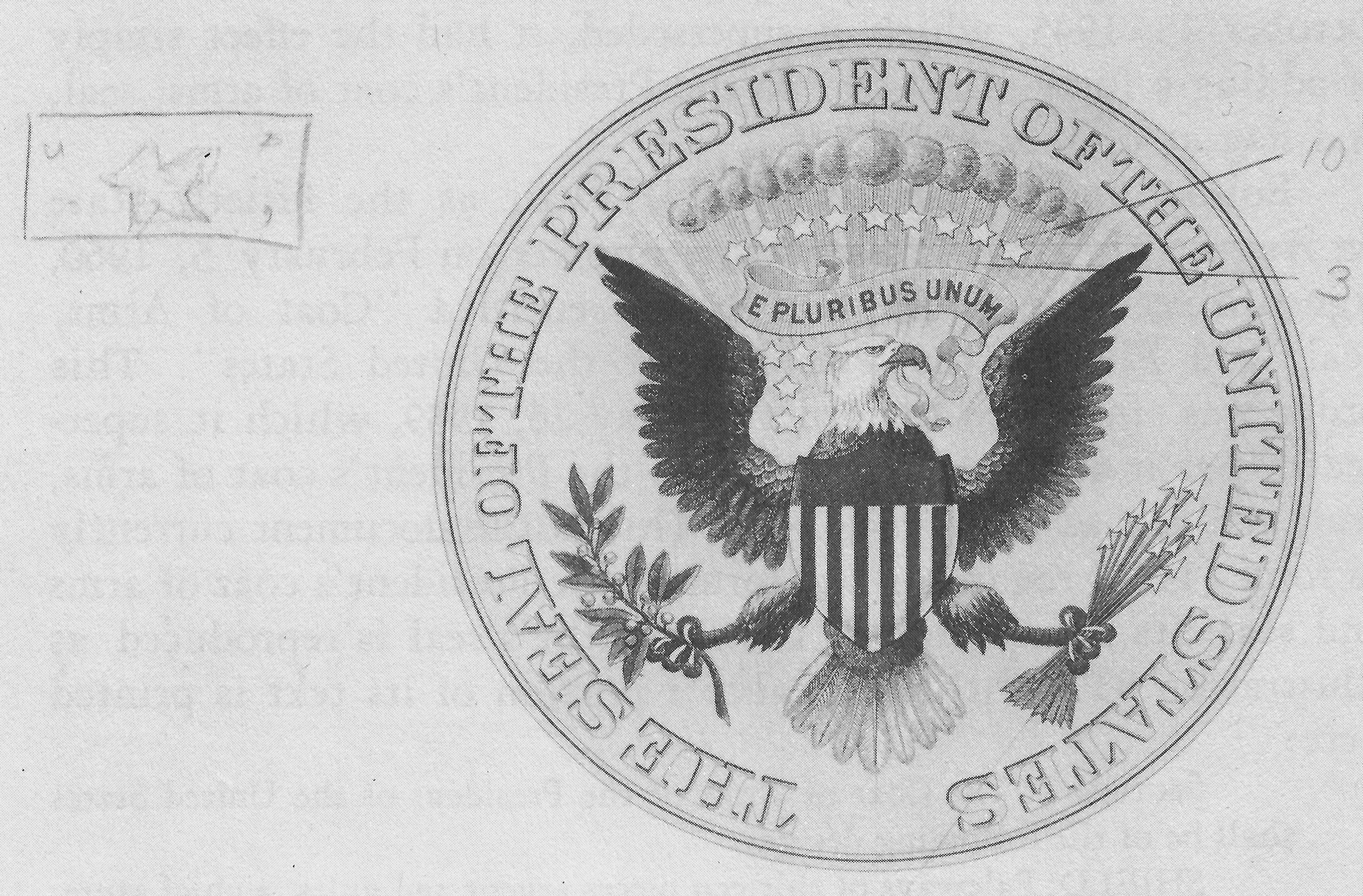
Presidential seal print, with annotations by McCandless, used during the 1916 flag discussions with President Wilson

In 1915, Woodrow Wilson decided to design a new flag for the presidency, replacing the separate flags then in use by the Army and the Navy. McCandless, the Aide to the Secretary of the Navy at the time, participated in the discussions along with Assistant Secretary of the Navy Franklin D. Roosevelt and Assistant Secretary of War Henry Breckinridge. McCandless suggested a design which added four stars to the Navy's version (which used the Great Seal on a blue background), as this would be enough to distinguish it from the Army infantry flag. McCandless then met with Wilson to demonstrate the proposed design; Wilson liked it but wanted to use the eagle from the presidential seal instead. This became the final design, and Wilson issued Executive Order 2390 on May 29, 1916, to officially define it.

In March 1945, Franklin Roosevelt wondered if the four stars were still appropriate, given the creation of the five-star Fleet Admiral and General of the Army ranks during World War II. Despite initial responses which recommended no change (the stars were not supposed to be indicative of rank), Roosevelt persisted and had a message sent to his old colleague McCandless, by this time a Commodore and commanding the Naval Repair Base in San Diego. Roosevelt died on April 12 before McCandless could reply, but Truman still expressed interest, so on May 29 McCandless sent a long letter containing a history of the President's flag, dozens of attachments and several recommendations for a redesign. McCandless primarily suggested using four six-pointed stars, each made up with twelve smaller stars. The six stars would indicate a higher rank, while the 48 total stars would represent the states. Truman (as a civilian) did not like the idea of designating rank, so instead requested a simple circle of 48 stars. McCandless accordingly made up a new drawing with this design. Further alterations (turning the eagle's head to its right, and changing the eagle to full color) were made by Arthur E. DuBois of the Heraldic Section of the Army's Office of the Quartermaster General (the forerunner of the Army Institute of Heraldry). This design was used for the presidential coat of arms, seal, and flag, and was officially defined with Executive Order 9646 issued on October 25, 1945. The accompanying press release discussed McCandless' role at length. It is still the current design for the presidential seal and flag, as the only changes since have been to add more stars after Alaska and Hawaii became states.

In 1962, McCandless began writing an extensive book on the Flag of the United States in collaboration with Annapolis classmate Rear Admiral William R. Furlong, but died in 1967 well before the book was finished. Furlong continued working on the book, and in 1971 turned over more than a thousand pages to the Smithsonian Institution, the sponsor (Furlong himself died in 1976). Dr. Harold D. Langley of the Smithsonian eventually edited down the manuscript to a 260-page book, So Proudly We Hail: The History of the United States Flag, which was published in 1981. Scott Guenther, an author of another flag book in 1990, ranked it along with a few others as "seminal works of scholarship on the history of the American flag".

Byron McCandless died on May 30, 1967, in Mariposa, California. In 1971, the frigate USS McCandless was named in honor of both Byron McCandless and his son, Rear Admiral Bruce McCandless (who died in 1968). There is also a street named after Commodore McCandless at the San Diego Naval Repair Base.

== Awards ==

1st Row	Navy Cross		
2nd Row	Legion of Merit	Mexican Service Medal	World War I Victory Medal
3rd Row	American Campaign Medal	American Defense Service Medal	World War II Victory Medal

== Books ==
- McCandless, Byron (1916). The Harbor of St. Thomas. OCLC 39488994.
- McCandless, Byron; Grosvenor, Gilbert (October 1917). Flags of the World. National Geographic Society. OCLC 2826771.
- Furlong, William Rea; McCandless, Byron (October 1981). So Proudly We Hail: The History of the United States Flag. Edited by Harold D. Langley. Smithsonian Institution Press. ISBN 978-0-87474-449-1.
