= Bruce McCandless =

United States Navy Medal of Honor recipient

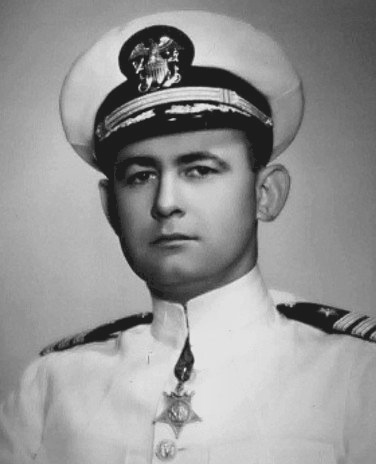
- Born: August 12, 1911; Washington, D.C., U.S.
- Died: January 24, 1968 (aged 56); Washington, D.C., U.S.
- Burial place: US Naval Academy Cemetery, Annapolis, Maryland
- Spouse: Sue Worthington Bradley
- Relatives: Commodore Byron McCandless, USN (father); Captain Bruce McCandless II, USN, NASA (son); Sue Worthington McCandless Wooldridge (daughter); Rosemary van Linde McCandless (daughter); Douglas Montrose McCandless (son); Sir Henry Hudson Kitson OBE (maternal great uncle); Captain Willis W. Bradley, USN (father-in-law); Sue Worthington Bradley (mother-in-law)
- Military career
- Allegiance: United States of America
- Branch: United States Navy
- Service years: 1928–1952
- Rank: Rear admiral
- Conflicts: World War II: Attack on Pearl Harbor; Naval Battle of Guadalcanal; Battle of Okinawa; Battle of Iwo Jima; Battle of Cape Esperance; Gilbert and Marshall Islands campaign; Battle of the Aleutian Islands; Solomon Islands campaign
- Awards: Medal of Honor; Silver Star; Purple Heart

Bruce McCandless I (August 12, 1911 – January 24, 1968) was an officer of United States Navy who received the Medal of Honor during World War II for his heroism on board USS San Francisco during the Naval Battle of Guadalcanal on November 13, 1942. He retired with the rank of rear admiral. McCandless was the father of NASA astronaut Captain Bruce McCandless II, USN (Ret). Additionally, Admiral McCandless was the great-grandson of David Colbert McCanles of the Rock Creek Station, Nebraska, shoot-out with Wild Bill Hickok. After that incident, the McCanles family changed their name to McCandless and moved to Florence, Colorado.

== Early life and family ==
The son of Rear Admiral (formerly Commodore) Byron McCandless (1881–1967), Bruce McCandless was born on August 12, 1911, in Washington, D.C. Following in his father's footsteps, Bruce graduated from the United States Naval Academy in 1932. His classmates included Richard Best, Henry Munson, and Lloyd Mustin.

McCandless married Sue Worthington Bradley, daughter of Captain Willis W. Bradley, USN. They had two sons and two daughters, including NASA astronaut Bruce McCandless II.

== Military service ==
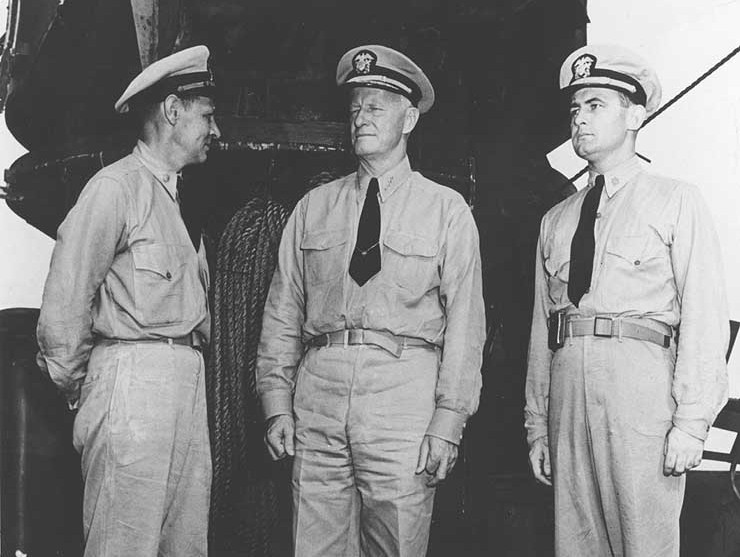
Admiral Chester Nimitz (center) visits Commander Herbert E. Schonland (left) and Lt. Commander Bruce McCandless on board the USS San Francisco at Pearl Harbor in December 1942. During the Naval Battle of Guadalcanal, Schonland assumed command after the ship's Captain was killed, and led damage control efforts. McCandless, the ship's Communications Officer, navigated the ship to safety. Both Schonland and McCandless received the Medal of Honor for their actions during and immediately after the battle.

McCandless served on the cruiser USS Indianapolis and the destroyer USS Case. He was serving as communications officer of the cruiser USS San Francisco when the Empire of Japan attacked Pearl Harbor on December 7, 1941. On November 13, 1942, during the Naval Battle of Guadalcanal, Japanese gunfire killed Rear Admiral Daniel J. Callaghan and his staff, including Captain Cassin Young and all other officers on San Francisco's bridge, except Lieutenant Commander McCandless, who took the conn for the rest of the battle. For his conduct, he was awarded the Medal of Honor, and promoted to full commander. San Francisco received the Presidential Unit Citation for this battle and, by the end of the war, was credited with 17 battle stars.

Cmdr. McCandless continued to serve on San Francisco until 1944, when he took command of the newly commissioned destroyer USS Gregory on July 29 of the same year. On April 8, 1945, during the Battle of Okinawa, Gregory was attacked and damaged by four kamikazes and McCandless was awarded the Silver Star for conspicuous gallantry during the battle.

Captain McCandless retired on September 1, 1952, with a terminal promotion to the rank of rear admiral. He died in Washington, D.C., on January 24, 1968, and was buried in the Naval Academy Cemetery in Annapolis, Maryland.

== Medal of Honor citation ==
=== Medal of Honor citation ===
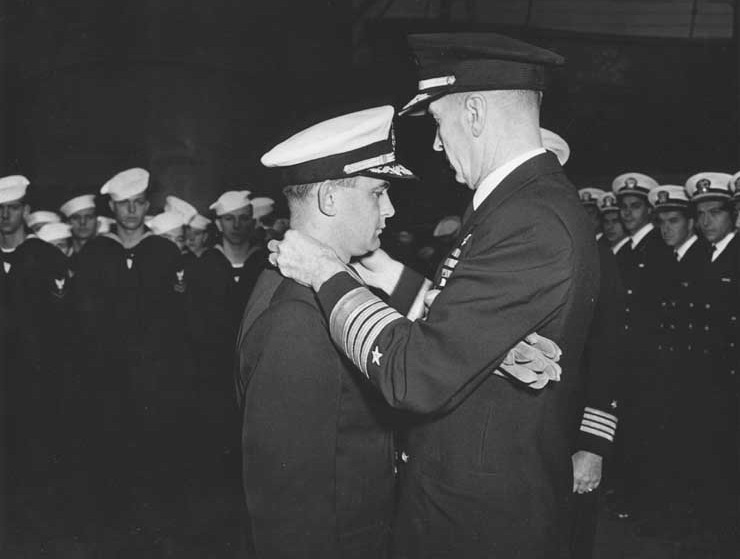
Admiral Ernest King, USN, presents the Medal of Honor to Commander McCandless, USN, December 12, 1942.

For conspicuous gallantry and exceptionally distinguished service above and beyond the call of duty as communication officer of the U.S.S. San Francisco in combat with enemy Japanese forces in the battle off Savo Island, 12–13 November 1942. In the midst of a violent night engagement, the fire of a determined and desperate enemy seriously wounded Lt. Comdr. McCandless and rendered him unconscious, killed or wounded the admiral in command, his staff, the captain of the ship, the navigator, and all other personnel on the navigating and signal bridges. Faced with the lack of superior command upon his recovery, and displaying superb initiative, he promptly assumed command of the ship and ordered her course and gunfire against an overwhelmingly powerful force. With his superiors in other vessels unaware of the loss of their admiral, and challenged by his great responsibility, Lt. Comdr. McCandless boldly continued to engage the enemy and to lead our column of following vessels to a great victory. Largely through his brilliant seamanship and great courage, the San Francisco was brought back to port, saved to fight again in the service of her country.

== Awards and decorations ==

1st row	Medal of Honor		
2nd row	Silver Star	Purple Heart	Combat Action Ribbon retroactive
3rd row	Navy Presidential Unit Citation with 1 Service star	American Defense Service Medal with Fleet clasp	American Campaign Medal
4th row	Asiatic-Pacific Campaign Medal with 7 Campaign stars	World War II Victory Medal	National Defense Service Medal

== Legacy ==
In 1971, the frigate USS McCandless (FF-1084) was named in honor of RADM McCandless and his father, Commodore Byron McCandless. There is also a street at the U.S. Naval Academy named after Admiral McCandless, as well as the Colorado State Veterans Nursing Home in Florence, Colorado. Commodore Byron McCandless has a street named after him at the US Naval Base, San Diego, California.

== See also ==
- List of Medal of Honor recipients
- List of Medal of Honor recipients for World War II
