= Cond =

Cond may refer to:

- Condition number, in numerical analysis
- cond, a conditional expression in LISP
- Cond, a variant spelling of conn, to control a ship's movements at sea.
