= Herbert Emery Schonland =

US Navy admiral and Medal of Honor recipient (1900–1984)

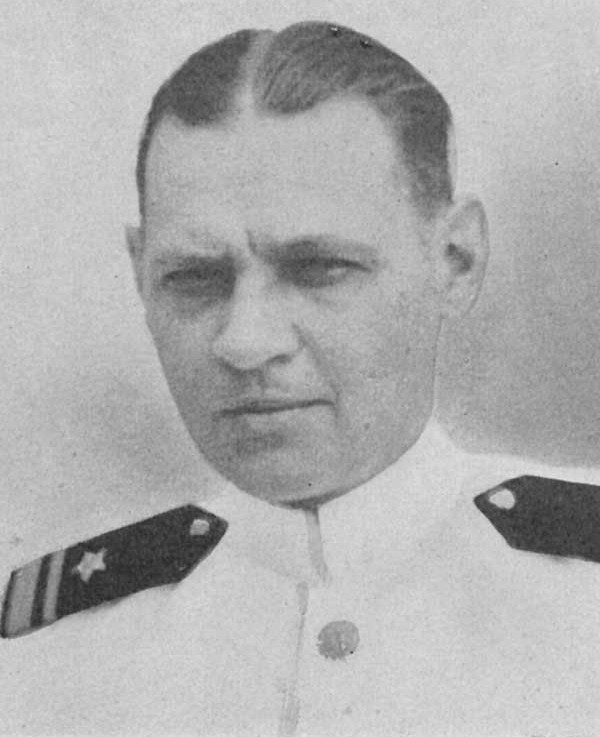
- Born: September 7, 1900; Portland, Maine, US
- Died: November 13, 1984 (aged 84); New London, Connecticut, US
- Burial place: Arlington National Cemetery
- Military career
- Allegiance: United States of America
- Branch: United States Navy
- Service years: 1925–1947
- Rank: Rear Admiral
- Unit: USS San Francisco (CA-38)
- Conflicts: World War II: Naval Battle of Guadalcanal
- Awards: Medal of Honor

Herbert Emery Schonland (September 7, 1900 – November 13, 1984) was a United States Navy Rear Admiral and a recipient of the United States military's highest decoration—the Medal of Honor for his actions in World War II.

== Early life ==
Schonland was born in Portland, Maine on September 7, 1900. He graduated from the United States Naval Academy in Annapolis, Maryland in 1925, as an ensign.

== Naval career ==
Following graduation from the naval academy, he reported to battleship USS Utah (BB-31) and later transferred to destroyer USS Lawrence (DD-250). In June 1928, he served in the submarine tenders USS Camden (AS-6) and USS Bushnell (AS-15). After attending Naval Torpedo Station at Newport, Rhode Island from 1932 to 1934, Schonland was assigned to light cruisers USS Lawrence (DD-250) and USS Milwaukee (CL-5) while also serving as Torpedo Repair Officer of Cruiser Division Three, Battle Force. In July 1935, he was transferred to cargo ship USS Argonne (AS-10) and was promoted to Lieutenant in May 1936. In June 1937, he became an instructor at the Naval Training Station in Newport and in June 1939, he was assigned to the heavy cruiser USS San Francisco (CA-38).

=== World War II ===
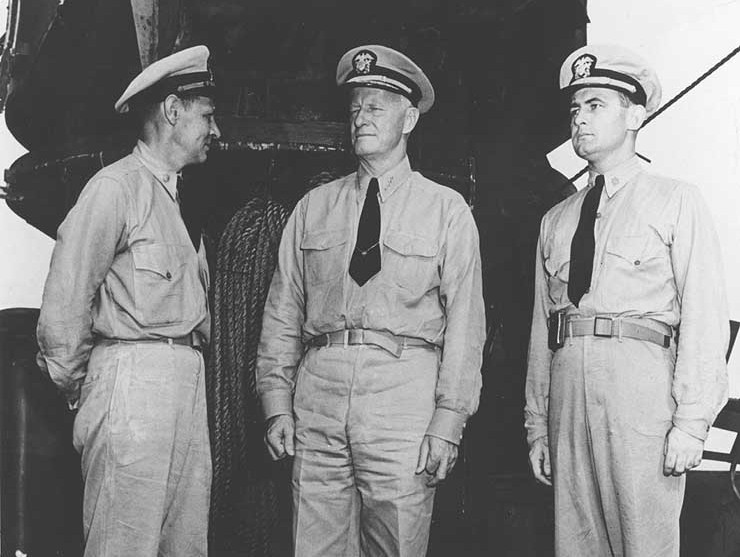
Admiral Chester Nimitz (center) visits Commander Herbert E. Schonland (left) and Lt. Commander Bruce McCandless on board the USS San Francisco at Pearl Harbor in December 1942. During the Naval Battle of Guadalcanal, Schonland assumed command after the ship's Captain was killed, and led damage control efforts. McCandless, the ship's Communications Officer, navigated the ship to safety. Both Schonland and McCandless received the Medal of Honor for their actions during and immediately after the battle.

Schonland was promoted to Lieutenant Commander in July 1941 and to Commander in August 1942. On November 12, 1942, the San Francisco was heavily damaged during the Naval Battle of Guadalcanal and began taking on water. Schonland, as the damage control officer, worked through the night to stop the flooding and save the ship. His actions during this encounter demonstrated his acumen. The ship had taken 85 hits in excess of five inches just above the water line and was leaking badly. Rear Admiral Daniel J. Callaghan and the ship's captain, Cassin Young, were among those killed, leaving Schonland as the surviving senior officer. Though command was devolved upon him, he was already engaged in critical damage control efforts while Lieutenant Commander Bruce McCandless took command of the San Francisco. At a key point during the effort to keep it from sinking, Schonland realized that the pumps for the second deck were inadequate to remove the water, but that the vessel had much higher capacity bilge pumps. So he called down to the engine room to arrange for all the bilge pumps to be pumping at full capacity, and the crew there ready for an immense amount of water. He then opened the hatches to the lower decks. This served the additional purpose of lowering the center of gravity of the ship, thus increasing its stability during the effort to save it. His actions were essential to the ship's survival. He received the Medal of Honor in recognition of his "extreme heroism and courage" on this occasion.

Schonland was San Francisco's Executive Officer when she was refurbished and put back into combat in 1943. He was put on staff duty at the Naval Training School in Philadelphia, Pennsylvania, in the fall of that year. He then started working as a damage control instructor at the Naval Training School in San Francisco, California, in the early months of 1944. In August 1944, Schonland received a promotion to the rank of Captain, retroactive to August 1943. In 1947, he was medically retired due to an eye injury he suffered in combat; in recognition of his exceptional battle record, he was appointed to Rear Admiral on the retired list.

== Later life ==
After his retirement from the Navy, Schonland taught at the University of Santa Clara for several years and served as principal of the Drew School in San Francisco before moving to New London, Connecticut in 1958. Schonland and his wife Claire Mills (1908–1997) had a son and a daughter.

Schonland died November 13, 1984, at age 84. He and his wife Claire are buried in Arlington National Cemetery, Arlington County, Virginia.

== Medal of Honor citation ==
Schonland's official Medal of Honor citation reads:

For extreme heroism and courage above and beyond the call of duty as damage control officer of the U.S.S. San Francisco in action against greatly superior enemy forces in the battle off Savo Island, 12–13 November 1942. In the same violent night engagement in which all of his superior officers were killed or wounded, Lt. Comdr. Schonland was fighting valiantly to free the San Francisco of large quantities of water flooding the second deck compartments through numerous shell holes caused by enemy fire. Upon being informed that he was commanding officer, he ascertained that the conning of the ship was being efficiently handled, then directed the officer who had taken over that task to continue while he himself resumed the vitally important work of maintaining the stability of the ship. In water waist deep, he carried on his efforts in darkness illuminated only by hand lanterns until water in flooded compartments had been drained or pumped off and watertight integrity had again been restored to the San Francisco. His great personal valor and gallant devotion to duty at great peril to his own life were instrumental in bringing his ship back to port under her own power, saved to fight again in the service of her country.

== Awards and Decorations ==

1st row	Medal of Honor		
2nd row	Combat Action Ribbon Retroactively Awarded, 1999	Navy Presidential Unit Citation	American Defense Service Medal with 'Fleet' Clasp
3rd row	American Campaign Medal	Asiatic-Pacific Campaign Medal with 6 Campaign stars	World War II Victory Medal

== Other honors ==
The U.S. Navy Surface Warfare Officer School's Damage Control School in Newport, Rhode Island was named Schonland Hall in his honor. It is unusual for buildings to be named for someone who is still alive and in this case the event occurred near the end of his lifetime, yet he was alert enough to understand and participate in the process. There was no previous person who had ever been awarded the Medal of Honor for damage control. (John Carlton-Foss reporting a personal communication with Andrew Sims, Schonland's son in law)

== See also ==
- List of Medal of Honor recipients
