= USS San Francisco (CA-38) =

New Orleans-class heavy cruiser

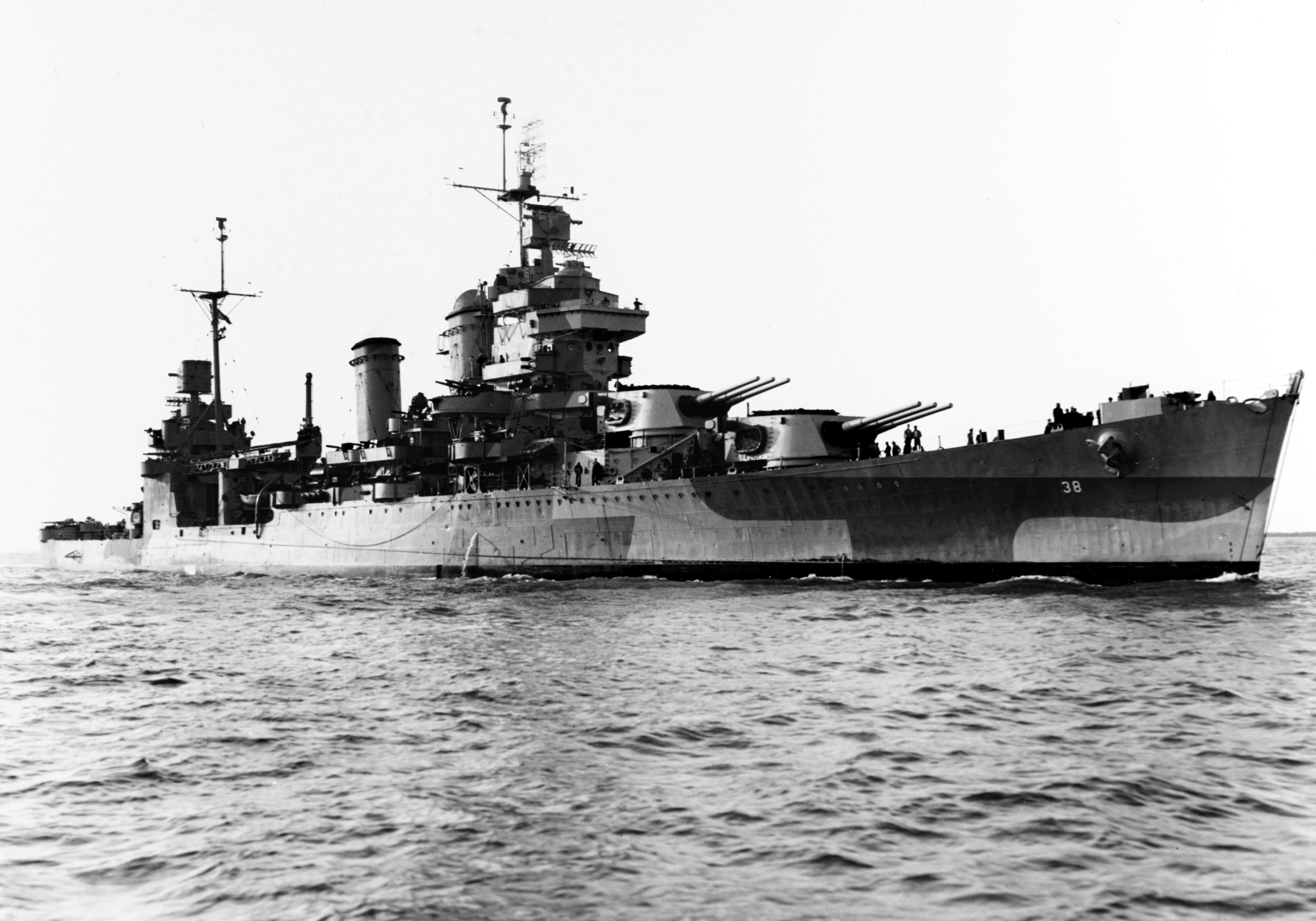
- San Francisco off the Mare Island Shipyard on 13 October 1944

History

United States
- Name: San Francisco
- Namesake: City of San Francisco, California
- Ordered: 13 February 1929
- Awarded: 11 October 1930 (date assigned to ship yard and beginning of construction period)
- Builder: Mare Island Navy Yard, Vallejo, California
- Cost: $11,318,000 (limit of cost)
- Laid down: 9 September 1931
- Launched: 9 March 1933
- Sponsored by: Barbara M. Bailly
- Commissioned: 10 February 1934
- Decommissioned: 10 February 1946
- Stricken: 1 March 1959
- Identification: Hull symbol: CA-38; Code letters: NIJZ
- Nickname(s): "Frisco Maru"; "Frisco"
- Honors and awards: 17 × battle stars; Presidential Unit Citation
- Fate: Sold for scrap on 9 September 1959; Scrapped at Panama City, Florida, May 1961

General characteristics (as built)
- Class & type: New Orleans-class cruiser
- Displacement: 9,950 long tons (10,110 t) (standard)
- Length: 588 ft (179 m) oa; 574 ft (175 m) pp
- Beam: 61 ft 9 in (18.82 m)
- Draft: 19 ft 5 in (5.92 m) (mean); 23 ft 6 in (7.16 m) (max)
- Installed power: 8 × Babcock & Wilcox boilers; 107,000 shp (80,000 kW)
- Propulsion: 4 × Westinghouse geared turbines; 4 × screws
- Speed: 32.7 kn (37.6 mph; 60.6 km/h)
- Capacity: Fuel oil: 1,650 tons
- Complement: 101 officers 803 enlisted
- Armament: 9 × 8 in (203 mm)/55 caliber guns (3x3); 8 × 5 in (127 mm)/25 caliber anti-aircraft guns; 2 × 3-pounder 47 mm (1.9 in) saluting guns; 8 × caliber 0.50 in (13 mm) machine guns
- Armor: Belt: 3–5 in (76–127 mm); Deck: 1 1/4–2 1/4 in (32–57 mm); Barbettes: 5 in (130 mm); Turrets: 1 1/2–8 in (38–203 mm); Conning Tower: 5 in (130 mm)
- Aircraft carried: 4 × floatplanes
- Aviation facilities: 2 × Amidship catapults

General characteristics (1945)
- Armament: 9 × 8 in (203 mm)/55 caliber guns (3x3); 8 × 5 in (127 mm)/25 caliber anti-aircraft guns; 2 × 3-pounder 47 mm (1.9 in) saluting guns; 6 × quad 40 mm (1.6 in) Bofors guns; 26 × single 20 mm (0.79 in) Oerlikon cannons
- Aviation facilities: 1 × Amidship catapult

USS San Francisco (CL/CA-38), a New Orleans-class cruiser, was the second ship of three of the United States Navy named after the city of San Francisco, California. Commissioned in 1934, she was one of the most decorated U.S. ships of World War II, earning 17 battle stars and the Presidential Unit Citation.

Like most of her sister ships, she saw extensive action during the Guadalcanal campaign. San Francisco survived the battle of Cape Esperance without damage and helped to sink the heavy cruiser Furutaka and the destroyer Fubuki and cripple the heavy cruiser Aoba, before partaking in the Naval Battle of Guadalcanal, during which she was heavily damaged and her captain and admiral killed. Earlier in the battle she mistakenly fired on the light cruiser Atlanta, causing serious damage and inflicting numerous casualties.

Decommissioned immediately after the end of the war, she was sold for scrap in 1959.

Her bridge wings, damaged during the Naval Battle of Guadalcanal and removed during repairs, are now mounted on a promontory in Golden Gate National Recreation Area. They are set on the great circle course from San Francisco to Guadalcanal.

== Construction and commissioning ==
San Francisco was laid down on 9 September 1931 at the Mare Island Navy Yard, Vallejo, California, under the supervision of Naval constructor Charles W. Fisher Jr.; launched on 9 March 1933; sponsored by Miss Barbara M. Bailly; and commissioned on 10 February 1934, Captain Royal E. Ingersoll in command.

The New Orleans-class cruisers were the last U.S. cruisers built to the specifications and standards of the Washington Naval Treaty of 1922. Such ships, with a limit of 10,000 tons standard displacement and 8-inch caliber main guns, may be referred to as "treaty cruisers." Originally classified as a light cruiser before she was laid down due to her thin armor, she was reclassified as a heavy cruiser because of her 8-inch guns. The term "heavy cruiser" was not defined until the London Naval Treaty in 1930.

== Inter-war period ==
After an extensive shakedown cruise – which included operations off Mexico, in Hawaiian waters, off Washington and British Columbia, and a voyage to the Panama Canal Zone – the cruiser returned to the Mare Island Navy Yard. Gunnery installation and conversion to a flagship took her into 1935. In February, she joined Cruiser Division 6 (Crudiv 6) at San Diego. In May, she moved north and participated in Fleet Problem XVI, then returned to southern California. A few weeks later, she was back off the northwest coast for fleet tactics, and in July, she steamed farther north to Alaska. In August, she returned to California and, through the end of 1938, San Francisco continued to range the eastern Pacific, cruising from the state of Washington to Peru and from California to Hawaii.

In January 1939, she departed the west coast to participate in Fleet Problem XX, conducted in the Atlantic east of the Lesser Antilles. In March, she became flagship of CruDiv 7 and commenced a goodwill tour of South American ports. Departing Guantanamo Bay Naval Base in early April, she called at ports on the east coast of that continent, moved through the Strait of Magellan and visited west coast ports, then in early June, transited the Panama Canal to complete her voyage around the continent.

== World War II ==
On 1 September 1939, World War II started, and on 14 September, San Francisco moved south from Naval Station Norfolk to join the Neutrality Patrol. The cruiser carried freight and passengers to San Juan, Puerto Rico, thence sailed for a patrol of the West Indies as far south as Trinidad. On 14 October, she completed her patrol back at San Juan and headed for Norfolk, where she remained into January 1940. On 11 January, she headed for Guantanamo Bay, where she was relieved as flagship by Wichita, where she returned to the Pacific.

Transiting the Panama Canal in late February, she called at San Pedro and, in March, continued on to her new home port, Pearl Harbor, where she rejoined CruDiv 6. In May 1940, she steamed northwest to the Puget Sound Navy Yard for an overhaul, during which she also received four 3 in (76 mm) guns. On 29 September, she returned to Pearl Harbor. In early May 1941, she became flagship of CruDiv 6; and, at the end of July, she moved east for a cruise to Long Beach, California, returning to Hawaii on 27 August. In September, the flag of CruDiv 6 was hauled down; and on 11 October, San Francisco entered the Pearl Harbor Navy Yard for an overhaul which was scheduled for completion on 25 December.

=== Pearl Harbor attack ===
On 7 December 1941, San Francisco was in Pearl Harbor awaiting docking and the cleaning of her heavily fouled bottom. Her engineering plant was largely broken down for overhaul. Ammunition for her 5 in (127mm) and 8 in (203mm) guns had been placed in storage. Her 3 in (76 mm) guns had been removed to permit installation of four 1.1 in (28 mm) quadruple mounts, although the mounts had not yet been installed. Her .50 in (12.7 mm) machine guns were being overhauled. Only small arms and two .30 in (7.6 mm) machine guns were available. Moreover, a number of San Francisco's officers and men were absent.

At 07:55, Japanese planes began dive-bombing Battleship Row near Ford Island. Off-duty signalman Ed Ifkin was relaxing on the signal bridge.

"I was reading the newspaper I'd just bought at the kiosk on the wharf, when an airplane buzzed over my head with that big red meatball on its side. I was trained to recognize foreign insignia and knew right away it was Japanese. I telephoned down to the bridge and told the duty officer. He said, 'Ifkin, you'll go on report for horsing around,' when BOOM! The first torpedo hit (USS) Oklahoma. Our guns were down, so a bunch of us climbed over to New Orleans. It was berthed right next us. We spent the next two hours feeding ammunition to the gunners."

Ifkin is recognized as the first U.S. sailor to report the Japanese attack.

By 0800, the attack on Pearl Harbor was well underway. The men of San Francisco secured the ship for watertightness and began looking for opportunities to fight back. Some, like Ifkin, crossed to her sister ship New Orleans to help man anti-aircraft batteries on that ship. Others began using available rifles and machine guns. Ammunition for .50 in (12.7 mm) machine guns was transferred to destroyer Tracy for use.

San Francisco was undamaged after the attack and work resumed to make her combat-ready.

On 14 December, the cruiser left the yard; the scaling of her keel had been postponed for more urgent repairs to other ships. On 16 December, she sortied with Task Force 14 (TF 14) to relieve Wake Island. The force moved west with a Marine fighter squadron onboard Saratoga and a Marine battalion embarked in Tangier. However, when Wake Island fell to the Japanese on 23 December, TF 14 was diverted to Midway Atoll, which it reinforced. On 29 December, the force returned to Pearl Harbor.

=== 1942 ===
On 8 January 1942, San Francisco again moved west. In TF 8, she steamed toward Samoa to rendezvous with, and cover the off-loading of, transports carrying reinforcements to Tutuila, Samoa. There, she joined Task Force 17 for raids on Japanese installations in the Gilbert and Marshall Islands. San Francisco arrived in the Samoan area on 18 January, and on the 24th was detached to continue coverage for the transports while the remainder of the task force and TF 17 conducted offensive operations to the northwest.

On 8 February, San Francisco departed from Tutuila. On the 10th, she rejoined CruDiv 6, then in TF 11, and she set a course for an area northeast of the Solomon Islands to strike Rabaul. However, the American force was sighted and attacked by two waves of Mitsubishi G4M "Betty" medium bombers. Sixteen of the planes were destroyed, but since the element of surprise had been lost, TF 11 retired eastward.

During the next few days, TF 11 – centered around Lexington – conducted operations in the South Pacific Area, then headed for New Guinea to participate with TF 17 in a raid against Japanese shipping and installations.

On 7 March, one of San Francisco's scout planes was reported missing and could not be found.

On the night of 9–10 March, TFs 11 and 17 entered the Gulf of Papua, whence, at dawn, Lexington and Yorktown launched their aircraft to cross the Owen Stanley Range and attack the Japanese at Salamaua and Lae.

The next day, the missing plane was sighted by Minneapolis and recovered by San Francisco. It had landed on the water, but had been unable to communicate. The pilot, Lieutenant J. A. Thomas, and the radioman, O. J. Gannan, had headed for Australia, sailing the plane backwards as it tended to head into the prevailing east wind. In five days and 21 hours, they had covered approximately 385 miles (715 km) on a course within 5 degrees of that intended.

San Francisco returned to Pearl Harbor on 26 March. On 22 April, the cruiser departed Oahu for San Francisco in the escort of convoy 4093. At the end of May, she headed west, escorting convoy PW 2076, made up of transports carrying the 37th Army Division, destined for Suva, and special troops bound for Australia. The cruiser remained in the escort force as far as Auckland, New Zealand. There she steamed for Hawaii, arriving at Pearl Harbor on 29 June.

San Francisco steamed west with Laffey and Ballard to escort convoy 4120 to the Fiji Islands. From there, she got underway to rendezvous with the Solomon Islands Expeditionary Force.

Operation Watchtower – the Guadalcanal-Tulagi offensive – opened on the morning of 7 August. Through that day and the remainder of the month, San Francisco helped to cover the American forces in the area. The flag of Rear Admiral Norman Scott, commanding the cruisers attached to TF 18, was shifted to San Francisco.

On 3 September, San Francisco's force put into Nouméa, New Caledonia, for fuel and provisions. On 8 September, the ships departed that island to cover reinforcements moving up to Guadalcanal. On the 11th, San Francisco's force, TF 18, rendezvoused with TF 17, the Hornet group, and the next day, both groups refueled at sea. On 14 September, the reinforcement convoy departed the New Hebrides. TF 61 commenced covering operations with TF 17, operating east of TF 18 and conforming to their movements.

At about 1450 on 15 September, Wasp was torpedoed on the starboard side. Fires broke out on the carrier. Explosions multiplied the fires. Admiral Scott took command of TF 18. San Francisco and Salt Lake City prepared to take the carrier in tow, but by 1520, the fires were out of control and destroyers began taking on survivors. Lansdowne torpedoed the burning hulk. TF 18 then headed for Espiritu Santo.

On the morning of 17 September, San Francisco, Juneau, and five destroyers put back to sea to rendezvous with TF 17 and resume coverage of reinforcement convoys. Other units of TF 18 had headed for Nouméa with Wasp survivors.

On 23 September, San Francisco, Salt Lake City, Minneapolis, Chester, Boise, and Helena, and Destroyer Squadron 12 (DesRon 12) became TF 64, a surface screening and attack force under the command of Admiral Scott in San Francisco. The next day, the force headed to the New Hebrides.

=== Battle of Cape Esperance ===
Main Article: Battle of Cape Esperance

On 7 October 1942, TF 64 departed from Espiritu Santo, the New Hebrides, and moved back into the Solomons to cover Allied reinforcements and to intercept similar operations by the Japanese. San Francisco served as admiral Scott's flagship in command of the heavy cruiser Salt Lake City, the light cruisers Helena and Boise, and 4 destroyers. On 11 October, at about 1615, the ships commenced a run northward from Rennel Island, to intercept a reported Japanese force of two cruisers and six destroyers reported heading for Guadalcanal from the Buin-Faisi, Bougainville Island area. The force continued north to approach Savo Island in The Slot from the southwest. By 2330, when the warships were approximately 6 mi (9.7 km) northwest of Savo Island, they turned to make a further search of the area. A few minutes after setting the new course, radar indicated unidentified ships to the west, several thousand yards distant. At about 2345, the Battle of Cape Esperance began.

The enemy formation consisted of the older heavy cruisers Aoba, Kinugasa, and Furutaka and the destroyers Fubuki and Hatsuyuki on a bombardment mission to Henderson Field, which spotted the American warships but rear admiral Gotō aboard Aoba assumed they were the two seaplane tenders and six destroyers of rear admiral Jōjima. In response, San Francisco, Salt Lake City, Helena, and the destroyers USS Laffy and USS Farenholt oped fire on Aoba at 23:43 and raked the Japanese flagship with a hail of 8-inch, 6-inch, and 5-inch gunfire, demolishing her superstructure, forward 8-inch (203 mm) gun turrets, fire control directors, and communication lines. Several large caliber shells over penetrated the bridge without exploding but still killed the majority of Aoba's command staff including rear admiral Gotō who died believing he had been the victim of friendly fire and cursed the sailors of Jōjima's ships, but not before ordering a 180 degree turn which exposed his ship's broadsides to the American forces. Admiral Scott ordered a ceasefire at 23:47, and after confirming he was not firing on American vessels San Francisco resumed action 4 minutes later. Aoba was further penetrated below the waterline which flooded crew spaces and disabled 4 of her boilers, while shells hit and destroyed her aft 8-inch (203 mm) gun turret. Having only fired 7 8-inch (203 mm) shells before every main battery gun was disabled, Aoba laid a smoke screen and limped away after being hit by over forty 8-inch (203 mm) and 6-inch (152 mm) shells with the loss of over 80 men.

With Aoba out of the fight, San Francisco, Helena, and Boise joined Salt Lake City in pounding the Furutaka. Fairly quickly, hits from the American cruisers detonated Furutaka's torpedo tubes and set the heavy cruiser ablaze before flooding her forward starboard and rear port engine rooms and disabling all of her guns, followed by a torpedo hit from the destroyer USS Bucanan which flooded her remaining engine rooms as San Francisco and others continued to poke holes below the waterline. Furutaka was hit over 90 times by gunfire from San Francisco, other cruisers, and escorting destroyers and sank by the stern over two and a half hours with the loss of 258 crew.

Immediately after ceasing fire on the disabled and sinking Furutaka, San Francisco noticed the Fubuki at point blank range. Recognizing the severe threat the destroyer's torpedoes posed, San Francisco blasted Fubuki at 1,650 yards (1,500 meters) and immediately shredded her bridge, foremast, and torpedo mount 1 by repeated 8-inch (203 mm) shell hits. San Francisco was shortly joined by Boise in pounding Fubuki, the destroyer was caught by surprise but managed to unload 4 torpedoes at her attackers, none of which hit. In turn, a flurry of 8-inch (203 mm) and 6-inch (152 mm) hits disabled torpedo mount 3 and the aft 5-inch (127 mm) gun turrets and set the ship ablaze. Fubuki fruitlessly fired her forward 5-inch (127 mm) guns before she rapidly shattered and sank just 5 minutes after the first hit with at least 78 lives lost.

However, the Americans took some losses when Kinugasa revealed herself and enacted a very impressive counterattack, helping to sink the destroyer USS Duncan (assisted by friendly fire), crippling Boise with an 8-inch (203 mm) hit to her forward turret barbettes, and wounding Salt Lake City with three 8-inch (203 mm) hits which damaged her boilers, steering machinery, and electrical gear and cut her speed to 25 knots while escaping with light damage. In spite of this, the Japanese losses were still far greater up to that point, followed later that morning by the sinking of the destroyers Murakumo and Natsugumo to American aircraft, concluding the battle of Cape Esperance in an American victory as San Francisco led the American fleet in retiring to Espiritu Santo.

On 15 October, San Francisco resumed operations in support of the Guadalcanal campaign. On the evening of 20 October, her group was ordered back to Espiritu Santo. At 2119, submarine's torpedoes were reported. Chester was hit amidships on the starboard side but continued under her own power. Three other torpedoes exploded: one off Helena's starboard quarter; a second between Helena and San Francisco; and the third about 1,200 yd (1,100 m) off San Francisco's port beam. Two others were sighted running on the surface.

San Francisco reached Espiritu Santo on the night of 21 October, but departed again on 22 October to intercept any Japanese surface units approaching Guadalcanal from the north and to cover friendly reinforcements. On 28 October, Admiral Scott transferred to Atlanta. The next day, San Francisco returned to Espiritu Santo, and on 30 October, Rear Admiral Daniel J. Callaghan, the commanding officer of San Francisco when the United States entered the war, returned to the ship and raised his flag as Commander, Task Group 64.4 (TG 64.4) and prospective TF 65.

=== Naval Battle of Guadalcanal ===
On 31 October 1942, the newly designated TF 65 departed from Espiritu Santo, the ships again headed into the Solomon Islands to cover troop landings on Guadalcanal. Bombardment missions in the Kokumbona and Koli Point areas followed. On 6 November, the transport group completed unloading, and the force retired, arriving at Espiritu Santo on 8 November. On 10 November, San Francisco, now flagship for TG 67.4, got underway again toward Guadalcanal.

The force arrived off Lunga Point on 12 November, and the transports commenced unloading. By mid-afternoon, an approaching Japanese air group was reported. At 1318, the ships got underway. At 1408, 21 Japanese planes attacked.

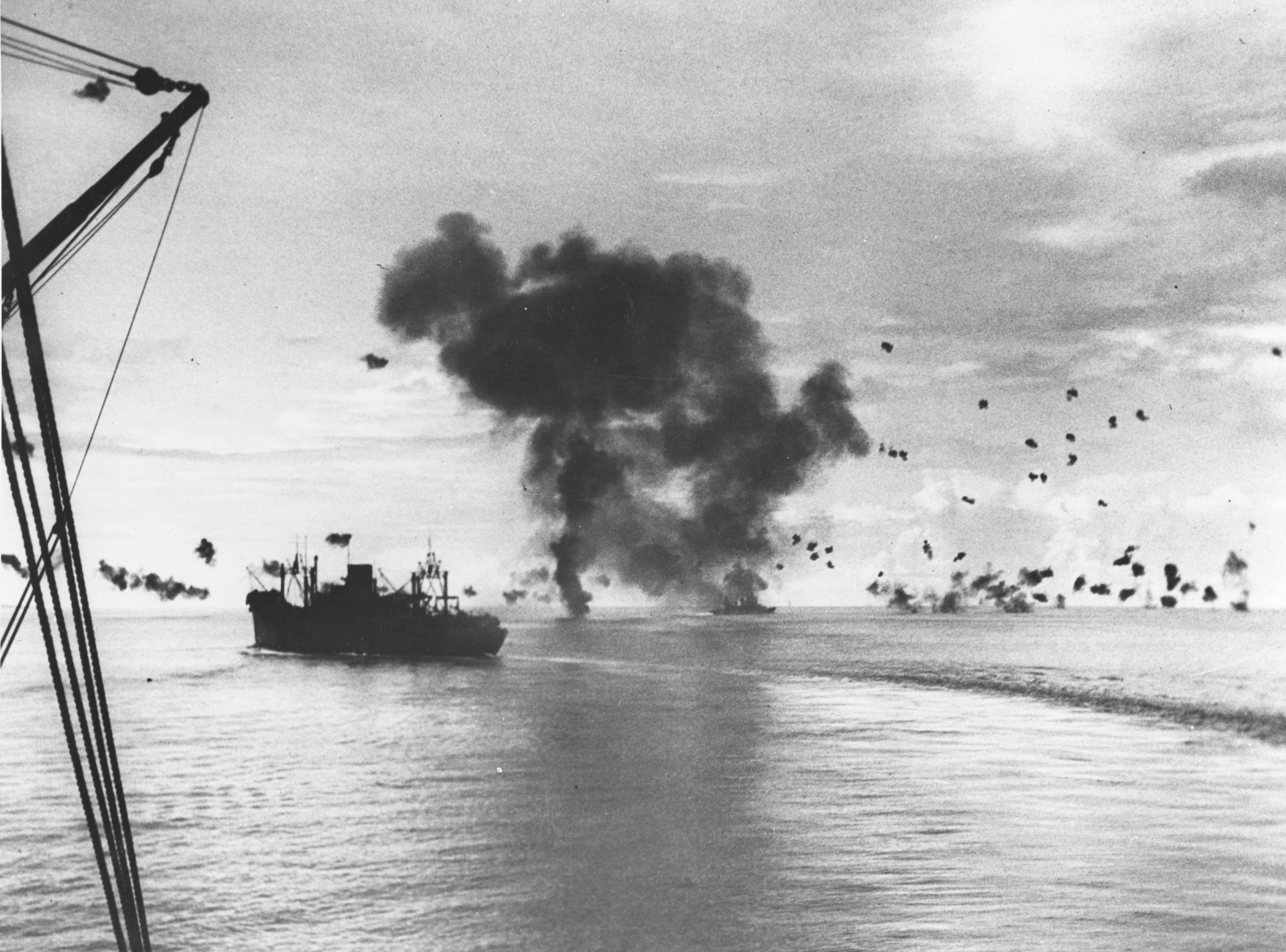
San Francisco (center) after being hit by a Japanese plane in the Naval Battle of Guadalcanal, 12 November 1942. Ship at left is President Jackson.

At 1416, an already-damaged torpedo bomber dropped its torpedo off San Francisco's starboard quarter. The torpedo passed alongside, but the plane crashed into San Francisco's control aft, swung around that structure, and plunged over the port side into the sea. 24 men were killed, 45 wounded, and one missing. Control aft was demolished. The ship's secondary command post, Battle Two, was burned out but reestablished by dark. The aft anti-aircraft director and radar were out, and three 20 mm mounts destroyed.

At about midnight, San Francisco, in company with heavy cruiser USS Portland, the light cruisers Atlanta, Helena, and Juneau, and 8 destroyers, entered Lengo Channel.

At 0125 on 13 November, a Japanese naval force was discovered about 27,000 yd (25,000 m) to the northwest, consisting of the battleships Hiei and Kirishima, the light cruiser Nagara, and 11 destroyers. Rear Admiral Callaghan's task group maneuvered to intercept, in what became the first engagement in the Naval Battle of Guadalcanal. At 0148, in almost pitch darkness, Hiei and the destroyer Akatsuki opened their searchlights and illuminated Atlanta. In response, San Francisco joined several American warships in blasting Akatsuki at 3,700 yards (3,400 meters) off her starboard beam, which San Francisco misidentified as an enemy cruiser. Heavy caliber shells immediately hit Akatsuki amidships and aft which destroyed the starboard engine room and set the destroyer on fire. Another wave of shell hits blasted the port engine room and crippled the steering gear as Akatsuki listed to port and tipped by the stern. Akatsuki rapidly capsized and sank at 1:55 with 223 killed, including Captain of destroyer division 6 Yamada Yusuke and the destroyer's commander Takasuka Osamu. At 1:51, San Francisco trained her guns on the destroyer Ikazuchi at 3,300 yd (3,000 m) off her starboard bow and hit her with three 8-inch (203 mm) shells which disabled her forward 5-inch (127 mm) guns and started a fire on her bow.

In exchange, Hiei fired at Atlanta and hit the light cruiser with up to thirteen 6-inch (152 mm) shells. Atlanta received as many as 49 hits in total, disabling her aft guns and setting her on fire before she was gouged by a torpedo from the Ikazuchi that disabled and sent her into the line of fire of San Francisco. In an attempt to locate other targets, San Francisco accidentally targeted Atlanta. San Francisco's gunfire caused extensive damage to Atlanta, killing Admiral Scott and most of Atlanta's bridge crew. Belatedly, San Francisco realized she was firing on a friendly ship and ceased. The green dye that San Francisco used to distinguish her shells from those of other ships, was later found on Atlanta's superstructure before she sank. Shortly thereafter, Hiei was sighted and taken under fire, at an initial range of only 2,200 yd (2,000 m). At such a close range the Hiei's armour was unable to withstand the incoming 8-inch gunfire, resulting in her steering mechanism being crippled.

At about 0200, San Francisco trained her sights on Kirishima. At the same time, she became the target of Nagara off her starboard bow and of a destroyer that had crossed her bow and was passing down her port side. The Japanese battleship joined the cruiser and the destroyer in firing on San Francisco whose port 5 in (130 mm) battery engaged the destroyer but was put out of action, except for one mount. The battleship put the starboard 5 in (130 mm) battery out of commission. San Francisco swung left while her main battery continued to fire on the battleships which, with the cruiser and the destroyer, continued to pound San Francisco. A direct hit on the navigation bridge killed or badly wounded all officers, except for the communications officer, Lieutenant Commander Bruce McCandless. Command fell to the damage control officer, Lieutenant Commander Herbert E. Schonland, but he thought his own efforts were needed to keep the ship "afloat and right-side up", so he ordered McCandless to stay at the conn. Steering and engine control were lost and shifted to Battle Two. Battle Two was out of commission by a direct hit from the port side, and control was again lost. It was reestablished in the conning tower, which itself soon received a hit from the starboard side. Steering and engine control were temporarily lost, and all communications were now dead.

Soon thereafter, the Japanese ceased firing. San Francisco followed suit and withdrew eastward along the north coast of Guadalcanal.

86 men, including Rear Admiral Daniel J. Callaghan and Captain Cassin Young, had been killed. Captain Young, like the San Francisco, was a veteran of the Pearl Harbor attack and was a Medal of Honor recipient for his actions at Pearl Harbor. 85 had been wounded. Of seven missing, three were subsequently rescued. The ship had taken 45 hits. Structural damage was extensive, but not fatal. No hits had been received below the waterline. Twenty-two fires had been extinguished.

At about 0400, San Francisco, all her compasses out, followed Helena and Juneau through Sealark Channel en route to Espiritu Santo for initial repairs.

At about 1000, Juneau's medical personnel transferred to San Francisco to assist in treating the numerous wounded. An hour later, Juneau took a torpedo on her port side from I-26, striking in the vicinity of the bridge. San Francisco was hit by several large fragments from Juneau. One man was hit and both his legs broken. The surviving ships were ordered to keep going without stopping to look for survivors.

On the afternoon of 14 November, San Francisco reached Espiritu Santo. For her participation in the action of the morning of the 13th, and for that of the night of 11–12 October, she received the Presidential Unit Citation. On 18 November, the cruiser sailed for Nouméa, and, on 23 November, she got underway toward the United States. She reached San Francisco on 11 December. Three days later, repairs were begun at Mare Island Naval Shipyard.

San Francisco had one current and three future Medal of Honor recipients on board at the time of the Battle of Guadalcanal. Captain Cassin Young had received the Medal of Honor for heroism at Pearl Harbor 11 months earlier. Rear Admiral Callaghan and Lieutenant Commanders Schonland and McCandless would receive the Medal of Honor at a later date. Callaghan was one of three U.S. Navy admirals to receive the Medal of Honor posthumously during World War II along with admirals Isaac Kidd who was killed at Pearl Harbor and Norman Scott who also died in the Battle of Guadalcanal.

=== 1943–1944 ===
During the yard period to repair battle damage, San Francisco received a general modernization similar to other US cruisers. Her forward superstructure was remodeled, with the bridge wings cut back, and most of the bridge windows either plated over or replaced by portholes. A large open bridge was built out at the 02 level, and modern SG surface search radar and air search radars added. In addition many 20mm and 40mm anti-aircraft cannons were installed. On 26 February 1943, she got underway to return to the South Pacific. After escorting convoy PW 2211 en route, San Francisco arrived at Nouméa on 20 March. Five days later, she continued on to Efate. She arrived back in the Hawaiian Islands in mid-April. She then headed north to the Aleutian Islands to join the North Pacific Force, TF 16, and reached Alaska toward the end of the month. Based at Kuluk Bay, Adak Island, she operated in the Aleutians for the next 4 1/2 months. She patrolled the western approaches to the area; participated in the assault and occupation of Attu in May and of Kiska in July; and performed escort duties.

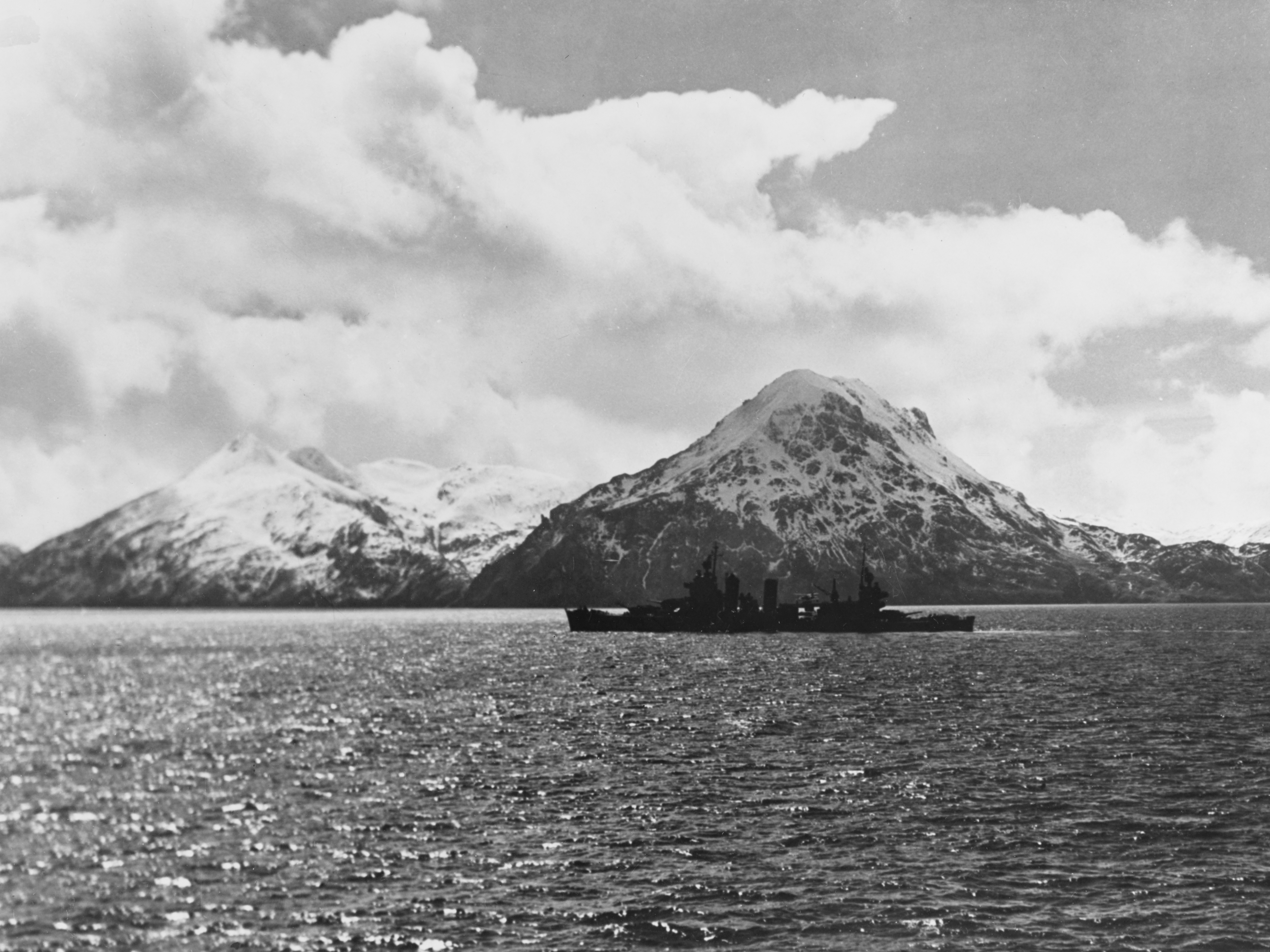
San Francisco off Adak Island in April 1943

In mid-September, she was ordered back to Pearl Harbor for repairs and reassignment to TF 14. On 29 September, San Francisco departed Pearl Harbor in Task Unit 14.2.1 (TU 14.2.1) for a raid against Wake Island. On 5 October, the group arrived off the target area and conducted two runs by the Japanese positions. On 11 October, her task unit returned to Pearl Harbor.

On 20 November, the force arrived off Makin. San Francisco participated in the pre-invasion bombardment of Betio, then patrolled outside the transport area to the west of Makin. On the 26th, she was detached and assigned to TG 50.1, joining Yorktown, Lexington, Cowpens, five cruisers, and six destroyers. With that force, she steamed toward the Marshall Islands to strike Japanese shipping and installations in the Kwajalein area. On 4 December, the carriers launched their planes against the targets. Shortly after noon, Japanese aerial activity increased, and at 1250, San Francisco came under attack. Three torpedo bombers closed her on the port bow. Her guns "splashed" two. The third was shot down by Yorktown. But during the attack, the cruiser had been strafed several times. One man had been killed, and 22 were wounded. After dark, the Japanese returned, and on that night, Lexington was torpedoed. The force moved north and west. Shortly after 0130 on 5 December, Japanese planes faded from the radar screens. The next day, the ships headed back to Pearl Harbor.

On 22 January 1944, San Francisco sortied with TF 52 and again headed for the Marshalls. On 29 January, the division, screened by destroyers, left the formation and moved against Japanese installations on Maloelap to neutralize them during the conquest of Kwajalein. Following the bombardment, the ships proceeded on to Kwajalein. San Francisco arrived off the atoll at about 0630 on 31 January. At 0730, she opened fire on targets of opportunity, initially a small ship inside Kwajalein lagoon. At 0849, she ceased firing. At 0900, she resumed firing at targets on Berlin and Beverly islands. Through the day, she continued to shell those islands, and, in late afternoon, added Bennett Island to her targets. During the next week, she provided pre-landing barrages and support fire for operations against Burton, Berlin, and Beverly islands. On 8 February, the cruiser sailed for Majuro, whence she would operate as a unit of TF 58, the fast carrier task force.

On 12 February, San Francisco, in TG 58.2, cleared Majuro lagoon. Four days later, the carriers launched their planes as part of Operation Hailstone. On the night of 16–17 February, Intrepid was torpedoed. San Francisco, with others, was assigned to escort her eastward. On 19 February, the group split; Intrepid, with two destroyers, continued toward Pearl Harbor, while San Francisco and the remaining ships headed for Majuro. On 25 February, San Francisco sailed for Hawaii with TG 58.2. On 20 March, the group returned to Majuro, refueled, and departed again on 22 March to move against the Western Carolines. From 30 March to 1 April, carrier planes hit the Palaus and Woleai. San Francisco's planes flew rescue missions.

On 6 April, the force was back in Majuro lagoon. A week later, the ships set a course for New Guinea. From 21 to 28 April, TG 58.2 supported the assault landings in the Hollandia (currently known as Jayapura) area. On 29 April, the ships moved back into the Carolines for another raid against Truk. On 30 April, San Francisco was detached and, with eight other cruisers, moved against Satawan. On completion of that bombardment mission, the cruisers rejoined TG 58.2 and headed back to the Marshalls.

Initially at Majuro, San Francisco shifted to Kwajalein in early June, and on 10 June, departed that atoll in TG 53.15, the bombardment group of the Saipan invasion force. On 14 June, she commenced two days of shelling Tinian, and after the landings on Saipan shifted to fire support duties. On 16 June, she temporarily joined CruDiv 9 to bombard Guam. Word of a Japanese force en route to Saipan, however, interrupted the cannonade, and the ships returned to Saipan.

On 17 June, San Francisco refueled and took up station between the approaching Japanese force and the amphibious force at Saipan. On the morning of 19 June, the Battle of the Philippine Sea opened for San Francisco. At about 1046, she was straddled fore and aft by bombs. "... a mass of enemy planes on the screen at 20 miles (30 km)." At 1126, the cruiser opened fire. A 40 mm shell from Indianapolis set off San Francisco's smoke screen generators. By noon, quiet had returned. At 1424, dive bombers made the last Japanese attack. By 20 June, San Francisco steamed westward in pursuit of the Japanese force. The next day, she returned to the Saipan area and resumed operations with the covering force for the transports. On 8 July, San Francisco again steamed to Guam to bombard Japanese positions. During the next four days, she shelled targets in the Agat and Agana areas. On 12 July, she returned to Saipan to replenish and refuel, and on 18 July, again took station off Guam.

From 18 to 20 July, she shelled Japanese positions, supported beach demolition units, and provided night harassing and defense repair interdiction in the Agat and Faci Point areas. On 21 July, she began to support Marines assaulting the Agat beaches. On 24 July, the cruiser shifted her fire to Orote Point.

On 30 July, she headed, via Eniwetok and Pearl Harbor, for San Francisco. The cruiser arrived back on the west coast on 16 August for overhaul.

On 31 October, she steamed west again, and on 21 November arrived at Ulithi, where she resumed flagship duties for CruDiv 6. On 10 December, she cleared the anchorage and moved toward the Philippines in TG 38.1. On 14–15 December, during carrier strikes against Luzon, San Francisco's planes were employed on antisubmarine patrol and in rescue work. On 16 December, the force headed for a rendezvous with TG 30.17, the replenishment force. A typhoon interrupted the refueling operations; and the ships rode out the storm for the next two days. On 19 December, she participated in a search for survivors from three destroyers which had gone down during the typhoon.

On 20 December, TF 38 turned westward again to resume operations against Luzon; but high seas precluded strikes. On 24 December, the force returned to Ulithi.

=== 1945 ===
Six days later, the force again sortied from Ulithi. On 2–3 January 1945, strikes were conducted against Formosa. From 5–7 January, Luzon was hit. On 9 January, fighter sweeps against Formosa were resumed. The force then headed for the Bashi Channel and a five-day, high-speed strike against Japanese surface units in the South China Sea and against installations along the coast of Indochina. On 15–16 January, the Hong Kong-Amoy-Swatow area was hit, and on 20 January, the force passed through Luzon Strait to resume operations against Formosa. On 21 January, aerial opposition was constant. Bogies appeared on the screen throughout the day. Langley and Ticonderoga were hit. On 22 January, strikes were launched against the Ryukyu Islands, and the next day, the force headed for the Western Carolines.

Arriving on 26 January, the ships sailed again on 10 February. On 16–17 February, strikes were conducted against air facilities in central Honshū. On 18 February, the force moved toward the Volcano and Bonin Islands, and on 19 February, covering operations for the Iwo Jima assault began. The next day, San Francisco closed on Iwo Jima with other cruisers and assumed fire support duties, which she continued until 23 February. Then she headed back toward Japan. On 25 February, Tokyo was the target. Poor weather prohibited operations against Nagoya on the following day, and on 27 February, the force headed back to Ulithi.

On 21 March, San Francisco, now attached to Task Force 54 (TF 54) for the invasion of Okinawa, departed Ulithi for the Ryukyus. On 25 March, she approached Kerama Retto, west of Okinawa, and furnished fire support for minesweeping and underwater demolition operations. That night, she retired and the next morning moved back in to support the landings and supply counter battery fire on Aka, Keruma, Zamami, and Yakabi Islands.

By the morning of 27 March, aerial resistance had begun. The next day, San Francisco shifted to Okinawa for shore bombardment in preparation for the assault landings scheduled for 1 April. On that day, she took up station in fire support sector 5, west of Naha, and, for the next five days, shelled Japanese emplacements, caves, pillboxes, road junctions, and tanks, truck, and troop concentrations. At night, she provided harassing fire near the beachhead.

On 6 April, the cruiser retired to Kerama Retto, refueled and took on ammunition, assisted in splashing a Nakajima B6N "Jill" torpedo bomber, then rejoined TF 54 off Okinawa as that force underwent another air raid. San Francisco downed a Nakajima B5N "Kate" torpedo bomber. Dawn of 7 April brought another air raid, during which a kamikaze attempted to crash the cruiser. It was splashed 50 yd (46 m) off the starboard bow. After the raid, San Francisco shifted to TF 51 for fire support missions on the east coast of Okinawa, rejoining TF 54 on the west coast in late afternoon. On 11 April, air attacks increased, and the next day, San Francisco set an Aichi D3A "Val" dive bomber on fire. The plane then glanced off a merchant ship and hit the water, enveloped in flames.

On 13–14 April, the cruiser again operated with TF 51 off the east coast of the embattled island. The next day, she returned to Kerama Retto, there proceeding to Okinawa and operations with TF 54 in the transport area. There she provided night illumination to detect swimmers and Shinyo suicide boats, and just before midnight assisted in sinking one of the latter. During the night, two further attempts by Shinyos to close the transports were thwarted.

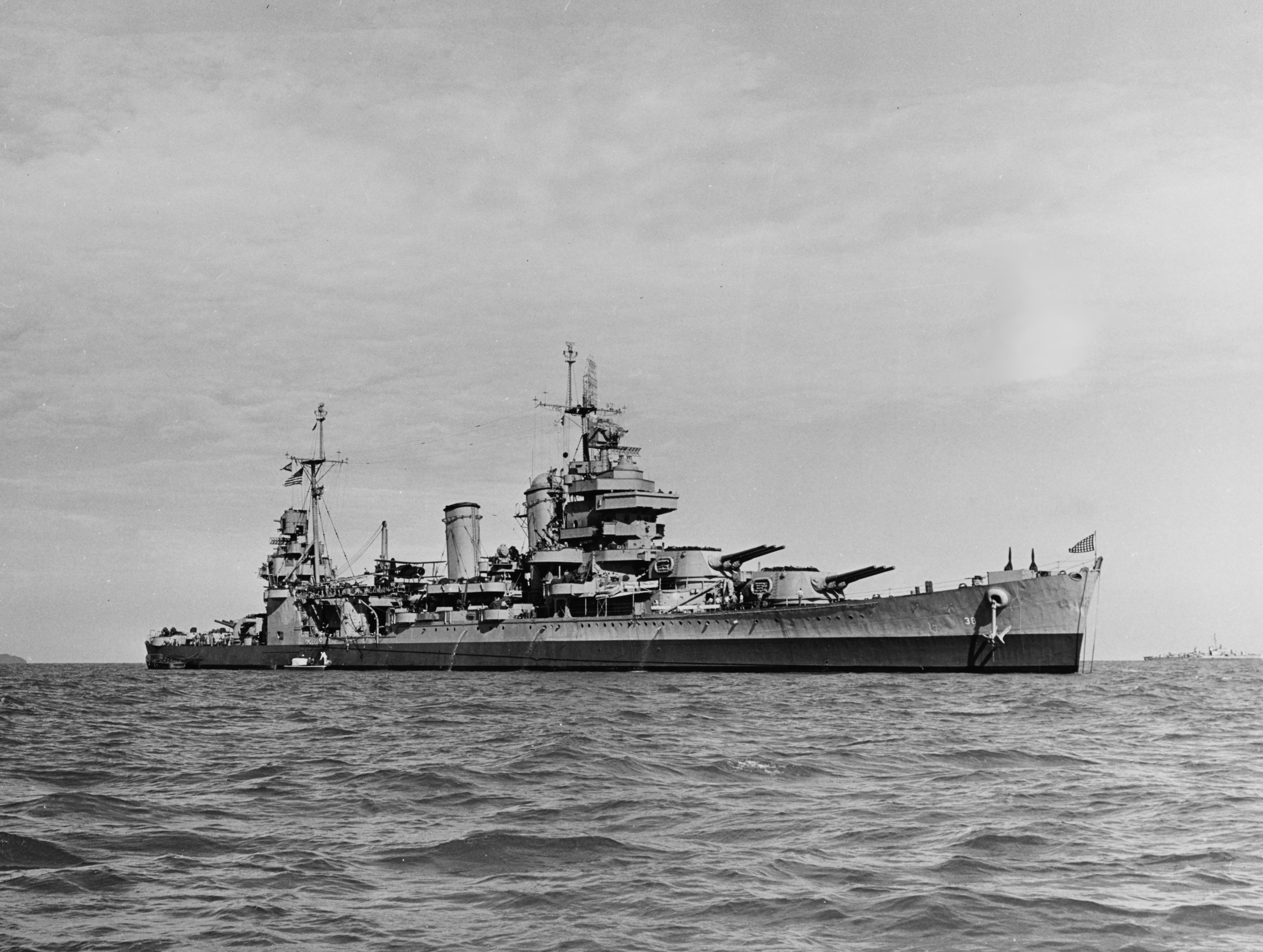
San Francisco near Korea in 1945.

With dawn, San Francisco returned to the Naha area to shell the airfield there. On 17 April, she moved up the coast and fired on the Machinate air field. The next day, she again shifted to the eastern side of the island and, that night, anchored in Nakagusuku Wan. The next day, San Francisco supported troops in the southern part of the island. From 21 to 24 April, she shelled targets in the Naha airstrip area; and got underway for Ulithi.

On 13 May, San Francisco returned to Okinawa, arriving in Nakagusuku Wan and resuming support activities against targets in southern Okinawa. For the next few days, San Francisco supported the 96th Infantry Division in an area to the southeast of Yonabaru. On 20 May, she shifted to Kutaka Shima, and by the night of 22 May, she had depleted her supply of ammunition for her main batteries. On 25 May, the Japanese launched a large air attack against Allied shipping in Nakagusuku Wan. On 27 May, San Francisco provided fire support for the 77th Infantry Division, and retired to Kerama Retto the next day. On 30 May, the cruiser returned to the western side of Okinawa and, for the next two weeks, supported operations of the 1st and 6th Marine Divisions.

On 21 June, San Francisco was ordered to join TG 32.15, 120 mi (190 km) southeast of Okinawa. A week later, she put into Kerama Retto for a brief stay, then rejoined that group. In early July, she provided cover for the eastern anchorage. On 3 July, she sailed toward the Philippines to prepare for an invasion of the Japanese home islands. The cessation of hostilities in mid-August, however, obviated that operation, and San Francisco prepared for occupation duty.

Between 7 December 1941 and 7 October 1945, San Francisco travelled 480,000 km and burned 114,478,423 litres of fuel oil. On her voyages, she crossed the equator 24 times and the international date line 33 times. Her guns fired 11,022 203mm shells, 24,191 127mm shells, 70,243 40mm shells and 73,904 20mm shells and her crew suffered 267 combat casualties. Her planes flew for 3,714 hours. The crew consumed 3,983,712 kg of edible provisions, ate 332,937 kg of beef, ate 925,328 kg of potatoes & ate 5,760,000 slices of bread.

== Post-war ==
On 28 August 1945, the cruiser departed Subic Bay for the China coast. After a show of force in the Yellow Sea and Gulf of Pohai areas, she covered minesweeping operations, and on 8 October anchored at Inchon, Korea. From 13 to 16 October, she participated in another show of force operation in the Gulf of Pohai area, then returned to Inchon, where Rear Admiral Jerauld Wright, Commander, CruDiv 6, acted as senior member of the committee for the surrender of Japanese naval forces in Korea.

On 27 November, San Francisco headed home. Arriving at San Francisco in mid-December, she continued on to the east coast on 5 January 1946, and arrived at Philadelphia, Pennsylvania, for inactivation on 19 January. Decommissioned on 10 February, she was berthed with the Philadelphia Group of the Atlantic Reserve Fleet until 1 March 1959, when her name was struck from the Naval Vessel Register. On 9 September, she was sold to the Union Mineral and Alloys Corp., New York, and scrapped at Panama City, Florida, in 1961.

== War memorials ==
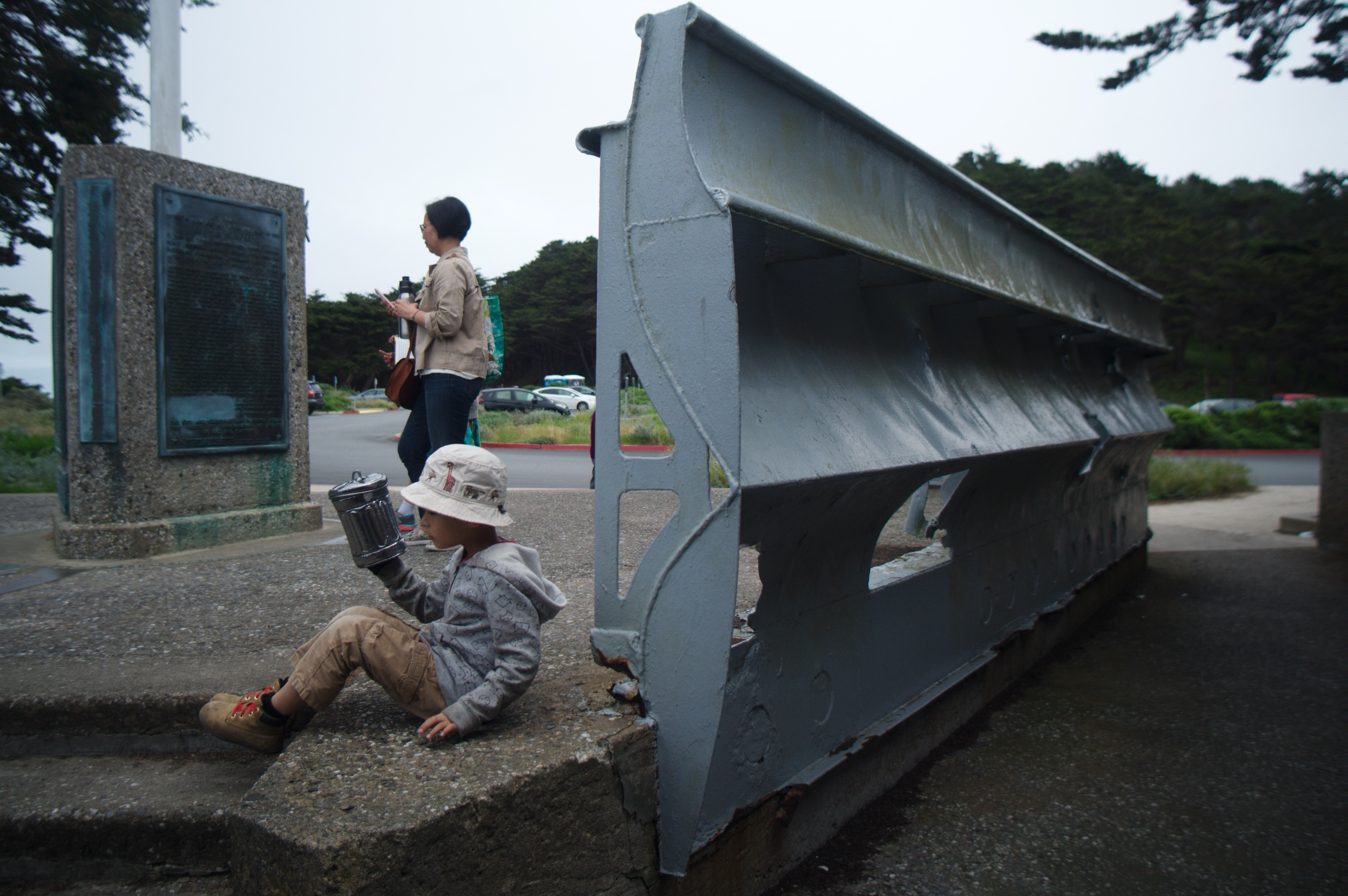
Removed bridge wings at Lands End

During the December 1942 repair at Mare Island, it was necessary to extensively rebuild the bridge. The bridge wings were removed as part of that repair, and are now part of a memorial to the ship on a promontory in Lands End, San Francisco at Golden Gate National Recreation Area overlooking the Pacific Ocean. One wing has extensive battle damage from the Naval Battle of Guadalcanal. They are set on the great circle course from San Francisco to Guadalcanal. The old ship's bell is housed at the Marines Memorial Club in San Francisco.

== Awards ==

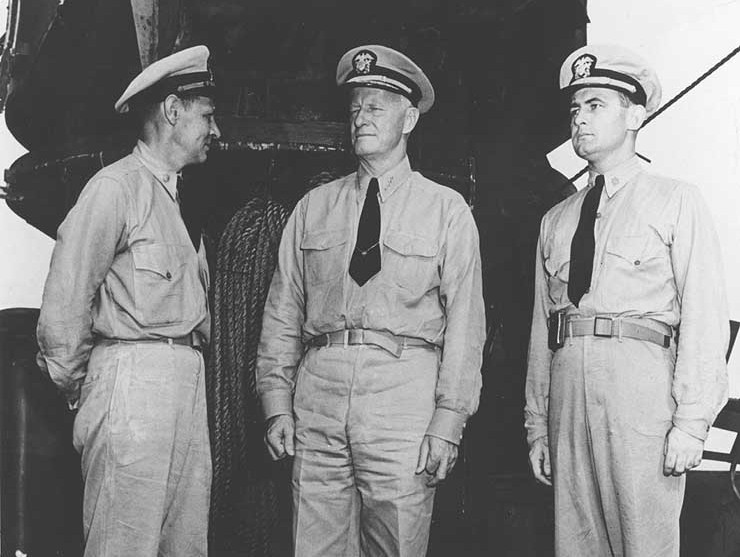
Schonland left, Nimitz center, McCandless right, on board San Francisco, December 1942.

San Francisco was among the most decorated US Naval vessels of World War II. San Francisco earned 17 battle stars during World War II, and when combined with the crewmember's awards of Medals of Honor, Navy Crosses, Silver Stars, etc., she is the second most decorated US ship of World War II after USS Enterprise, CV-6. For her participation in the Naval Battle of Guadalcanal and Battle of Cape Esperance, she was awarded the Presidential Unit Citation with star. For the same action, three members of her crew were awarded the Medal of Honor: Lieutenant Commander Herbert E. Schonland, Lieutenant Commander Bruce McCandless, and Boatswain's Mate 1st Class Reinhardt J. Keppler (posthumous). Admiral Callaghan was also awarded the Medal of Honor (posthumous).
