= McCanles Gang =

Outlaw gang

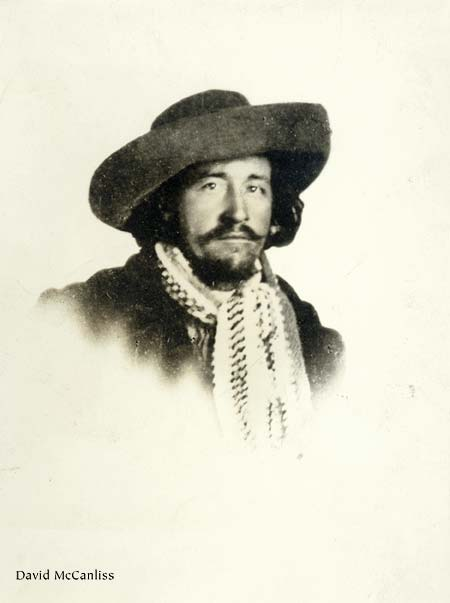
David C. McCanles, 1860

The McCanles Gang (later changed to McCandless) was an alleged outlaw gang active in the early 1860s that was accused of train robbery, bank robbery, cattle rustling, horse theft, and murder. On July 12, 1861, some of its supposed members, including alleged leader David Colbert McCanles, were killed by "Wild Bill" Hickok during a confrontation at a Pony Express station in the Nebraska Territory. The incident was among the earliest to frame Hickok's later reputation as a legendary gunfighter.

Historians have since argued that the victims of the shooting were innocent and that their only crime was to cross paths with Hickok. Questions remain surrounding the veracity of the allegations of the gang's crimes, and whether the McCanles Gang ever existed at all.

== McCanles incident ==
The legend of the McCanles "Gang" has been traced to a single incident between a young Hickok (not yet known as "Wild Bill") and a rancher named David Colbert McCanles at Rock Creek Station, a stagecoach and Pony Express station in southern Nebraska, near present-day Fairbury. McCanles, a former sheriff of Watauga County, North Carolina, was known as a local bully and had earlier had an argument with Hickok over the latter "stealing" his mistress, Sarah (Kate) Shull.

=== Background ===
Prior to the incident, McCanles leased a cabin and well on the east side of Rock Creek to the Russell, Waddell, and Majors freight company to be used as a relay station for the Overland Stage Company and the Pony Express mail service. The company hired Horace G. Wellman as station agent. Wellman later arranged to purchase the land in installments. In April or early May 1861, 23-year-old James Butler Hickok was hired by the station as a stock tender. He quickly became a target of harassment by McCanles, who teased Hickok about his girlish build and nicknamed him "Duck Bill" for his long nose and protruding lips.

The freight company soon fell behind on paying its installments, and on July 12, 1861, McCanles arrived at the station with his 12-year-old son Monroe (or William Monroe), his cousin James Woods, and another employee, James Gordon, demanding to see Horace Wellman in order to collect a long-overdue payment. There are several different versions of what happened next. In some versions, McCanles was initially met by Wellman's wife and Hickok at the door, who told him that Wellman was either unavailable or unwilling to meet with him. Other accounts suggest that Wellman himself was present for the confrontation. At some point, either by invitation or by force, McCanles entered the station cabin and argued with the occupants. He was then shot by Hickok, who was hiding behind a curtain. McCanles's son immediately rushed into the building. Woods and Gordon, like McCanles, were unarmed and attempted to flee, but Hickok stepped from the cabin and wounded both with his pistols. The two men were then killed by other members of the relay station. Gordon was killed by station employee J. W. "Doc" Brink with a shotgun blast; Woods was killed by Horace Wellman (or Wellman's wife), who hacked him to death with a gardening hoe. Hickok was not reported as wounded. During the attack, McCanles's son Monroe was able to escape via a dry creekbed.

This violent encounter was an early contributor to Hickok's reputation as a legendary gunman, as reported years later in Harper's Monthly, where the story was wildly sensationalized. According to the story, Hickok single-handedly killed the nine "desperadoes, horse-thieves, murderers, and regular cutthroats" known as the McCanles Gang "in the greatest one man gunfight in history." During the battle, Hickok (armed with a pistol, a rifle, and a Bowie knife), purportedly suffered 11 bullet wounds.

== Aftermath ==
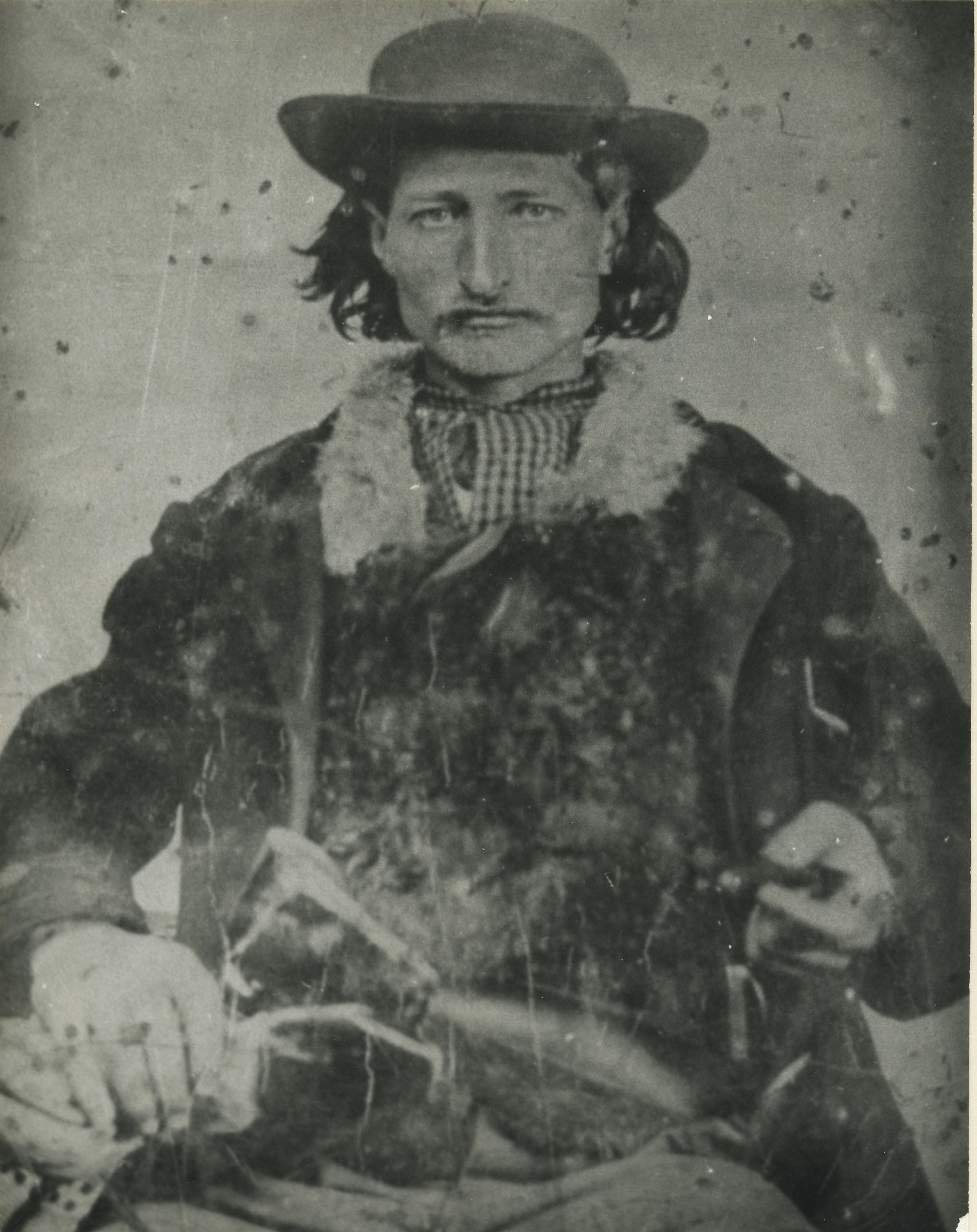
James Butler "Wild Bill" Hickok, c. early 1860s

David McCanles's brother James immediately filed for an arrest warrant for "Duck Bill", Wellman, and "Dock" Brink, who were charged with the murders. When the case was brought to trial, Monroe McCanles, the only surviving witness on the State's side, who had been subpoenaed to testify, was not permitted by the judge to take the stand and the court heard only the account given by the station employees. The judge ruled that the defendants had acted in self-defense.

From The DeWitt Times News, as told by the foreman of the company stations:

At the time of this affair I was at a station farther west and reached this station just as Wild Bill was getting ready to go to Beatrice for his trial. He wanted me to go with him and as we started on our way, imagine my surprise and uncomfortable feeling when he announced his intention of stopping at the McCanles home. I would have rather been somewhere else, but Bill stopped. He told Mrs. McCanles he was sorry he had to kill her man then took out $35 [$1,254 in 2025 dollars] and gave it to her saying: 'This is all I have, sorry I do not have more to give you.' We drove on to Beatrice and at the trial, his plea was self-defense, no one appeared against him and he was cleared. The trial did not last more than fifteen minutes.

After this tragedy, some of the McCanles family moved to Florence, Colorado, and changed the spelling of the name to McCandless. Hickok, making use of his new notoriety also changed his name after this incident. After growing a moustache to hide his protruding upper lip, he encouraged people to call him "Wild Bill" instead of "Duck Bill".

== Later witness accounts ==
The first account was published around 1882 by S. C. Jenkins and S. J. Alexander, who had arrived at the ranch within two hours of the shootout taking place and before the bodies were removed. According to them, David McCanles' brother James was a Southern sympathizer and had tried to persuade Hickok to join him and turn over the stage company's stock. After Hickok's refusal, James threatened to kill him. Later that afternoon, David and three others arrived with the intention of carrying out the threat.

In 1883, D. M. Kelsey published Our Pioneer Heroes and Their Daring Deeds, which contained a biography for "Wild Bill" based on Hickok's own accounts. Hickok claimed he had killed six of the ten members of the McCanles Gang, who had rushed in after using a log to batter the station door down. Two of these he claimed to have killed in a knife fight after he was wounded.

I remember that one of them struck me with his gun, and I got hold of a knife, and then I got kind o' wild like, and it was all cloudy, and I struck savage blows, following the devils up from one side of the room to the other and into the corners, striking and slashing until I knew every one was dead.

The remaining four attackers then fled, and Hickok picked up a rifle and shot one dead; another later died of his wounds. He continued:

All of a sudden, it seemed like my heart was on fire. I was bleeding everywhere. I rushed out to the well and drank from the bucket, and then tumbled down in a faint.

The dead, according to Hickok, included David McCanles's brothers James and Jack LeRoy McCanles; however, according to records, Jack LeRoy McCanles was still alive in 1883 and was a "good citizen" of Florence, Colorado.

An account by William Monroe McCanles (the son of David McCanles) appeared in the Fairbury Journal on September 25, 1930. Monroe maintained that he had gone with his father to the station to collect money and that they had been unarmed:

Probably the motive for killing was fear. Father had told Mrs. Wellman to tell her husband to come out. The Wellmans were the folks who lived there and kept the station. She said he wouldn't and father said if he wouldn't come out he would go in and drag him out. I think rather than be man-handled, he killed father.

"Buffalo Bill" Cody's visit to Major Israel McCreight at the Wigwam in Du Bois, Pennsylvania, on June 22, 1908, remains a notable event in Wild West history. On this occasion, Monroe McCanles was McCreight's houseguest and told Buffalo Bill about his father Dave McCanles having been shot by "Wild Bill" Hickok. The "McCanles Incident" was then the subject of controversy and debate by Wild West historians. Monroe McCanles disclosed that at the age of twelve he had stood beside his father Dave McCanles when Hickok shot him dead from behind a curtain. For the first time, Buffalo Bill heard an alternative account of the event and remarked that he would include the story in his projected autobiography. McCreight wrote articles about the "McCanles Incident" for the rest of his life.

== Legacy ==
Another son of David Colbert McCanles, Julius McCandless, was the father of Rear Admiral Byron McCandless, USN, recipient of the Navy Cross in World War I. David's great-grandson was Rear Admiral Bruce McCandless, USN, recipient of the Congressional Medal of Honor in World War II, and his great-great-grandson was Captain Bruce McCandless II, USN, the NASA astronaut who made the first untethered spacewalk.
