= Cune =

Cune may refer to:

- cune (band), a Japanese band on Rainbow Entertainment
- Cune Press, American publisher established in 1994
- CUNE wine, produced by Compañía Vinícola del Norte de España
- Jovan Gojković (known as "Cune"; 1975–2001), Serbian football player
- Predrag Gojković-Cune (known as "Cune"; 1932–2017), Serbian singer

== See also ==
- McCune (disambiguation)
