= USS McCandless =

USN Knox-class frigate

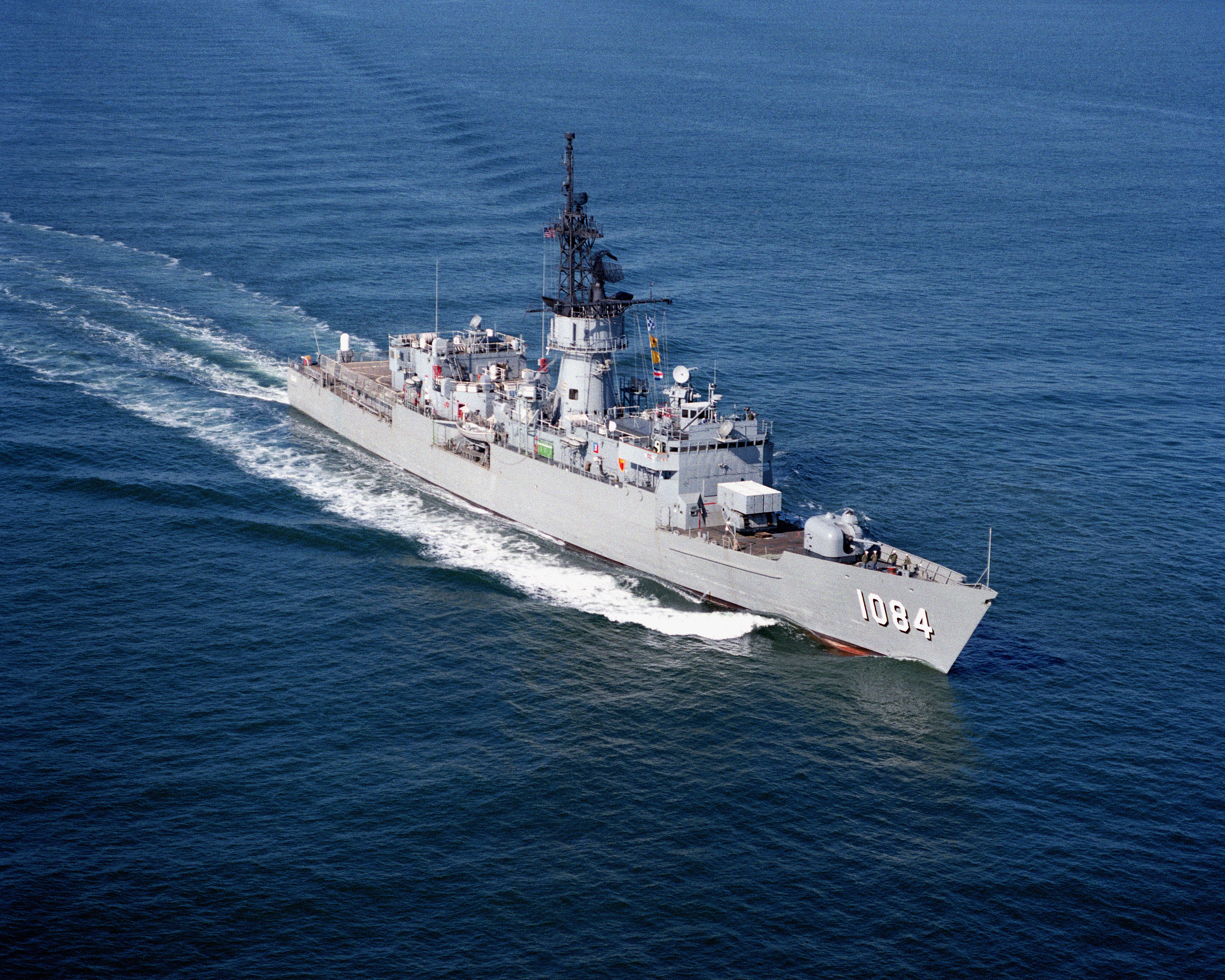
- USS McCandless (FF-1084)

History

United States
- Name: McCandless
- Namesake: Commodore Byron McCandless and Admiral Bruce McCandless I
- Ordered: 25 August 1966
- Builder: Avondale Shipyard, Westwego, Louisiana
- Laid down: 4 June 1970
- Launched: 20 March 1971
- Completed: 1972
- Commissioned: 18 March 1972
- Decommissioned: 6 May 1994
- In service: 1972
- Out of service: 1994
- Stricken: 11 January 1994
- Identification: FF-1084/FFT-1084
- Motto: Illumino Marem
- Nickname(s): The Mac
- Fate: Disposed of through the Security Assistance Program (SAP), transferred, Foreign Assistance Act (FAA) Section 516, Southern Region Amendment, to Turkey, 2 February 2002

Turkey
- Name: Trakya
- Acquired: 6 May 1994, leased
- Commissioned: 6 May 1994
- Decommissioned: 2003
- Identification: F-254
- Fate: Scrapped

General characteristics
- Class & type: Knox-class frigate
- Type: Frigate
- Displacement: 3,195 tons (4,175 full load)
- Length: 438 ft (134 m)
- Beam: 46 ft 9 in (14.25 m)
- Draft: 24 ft 9 in (7.54 m)
- Installed power: 2 × CE 1200psi boilers; 35,000 shp (26,000 kW)
- Propulsion: 1 Westinghouse geared turbine; 1 shaft
- Speed: over 27 knots (50 km/h; 31 mph)
- Range: 4,500 nautical miles (8,300 km; 5,200 mi) at 20 knots (37 km/h; 23 mph)
- Complement: 18 officers, 267 enlisted
- Sensors & processing systems: AN/SPS-40 Air Search Radar; AN/SPS-67 Surface Search Radar; AN/SQS-26CX Sonar; AN/SQS-35 Towed array sonar system; Mk68 Gun Fire Control System
- Electronic warfare & decoys: AN/SLQ-32 Electronics Warfare System
- Armament: one Mk-16 8 cell missile launcher for RUR-5 ASROC and Harpoon missiles; one Mk-42 5-inch/54 caliber gun; Mark 46 torpedoes from four single tube launchers); one Phalanx CIWS
- Aircraft carried: one SH-2 Seasprite (LAMPS I) helicopter
- Aviation facilities: Helipad, Hangar Bay

USS McCandless (FF-1084) was a Knox-class frigate of the US Navy. Commissioned in 1972, she served for 22 years before being decommissioned as a training frigate, and sold to the Turkish Navy as TCG Trakya (F-254). She also participated in Operation Desert Storm in 1991.

== Design and description ==
The Knox class design was derived from the Brooke-class frigate modified to extend range and without a long-range missile system. The ships had an overall length of 438 feet (133.5 m), a beam of 47 feet (14.3 m) and a draft of 25 feet (7.6 m). They displaced 4,066 long tons (4,131 t) at full load. Their crew consisted of 13 officers and 211 enlisted men.

The ships were equipped with one Westinghouse geared steam turbine that drove the single propeller shaft. The turbine was designed to produce 35,000 shaft horsepower (26,000 kW), using steam provided by 2 C-E boilers, to reach the designed speed of 27 knots (50 km/h; 31 mph). The Knox class had a range of 4,500 nautical miles (8,300 km; 5,200 mi) at a speed of 20 knots (37 km/h; 23 mph).

The Knox-class ships were armed with a 5"/54 caliber Mark 42 gun forward and a single 3-inch/50-caliber gun aft. They mounted an eight-round RUR-5 ASROC launcher between the 5-inch (127 mm) gun and the bridge. Close-range anti-submarine defense was provided by two twin 12.75-inch (324 mm) Mk 32 torpedo tubes. The ships were equipped with a torpedo-carrying DASH drone helicopter; its telescoping hangar and landing pad were positioned amidships aft of the mack. Beginning in the 1970s, the DASH was replaced by a SH-2 Seasprite LAMPS I helicopter and the hangar and landing deck were accordingly enlarged. Most ships also had the 3-inch (76 mm) gun replaced by an eight-cell BPDMS missile launcher in the early 1970s.

== Service history ==
McCandless's first deployment was a cruise to the Middle East that began in August 1973, and lasted through January of the following year. Subsequent to this initial voyage overseas, McCandless adopted a regular schedule of deployments which took her to the waters of the North Atlantic, Mediterranean, Caribbean, and Persian Gulf. McCandless's last tactical missions were in support of Operation Desert Storm—a US-led coalition force of 34 nations against Iraq in response to Iraq's invasion of Kuwait— from January through May 1990, and June through December 1991. McCandless was awarded the Kuwait Liberation Medal by Kuwait for her efforts during these deployments.

31 December 1991 marked McCandless's assignment to the Naval Reserve Force, Atlantic (Norfolk, Virginia) where she was reclassified as a training frigate (FFT-1084). McCandless was one of only eight ships of her class which received this redesignation. Simultaneously decommissioned and leased to Turkey under the new name of TCG Trakya (F-254) on 6 May 1994, McCandless was struck from the Naval Vessel Register on 11 January. Turkey purchased the vessel in February 2002. She was decommissioned in 2003 and scrapped.

== Ship Awards ==
- Sea Service Deployment Ribbon
- Humanitarian Service Ribbon
- CG Meritorious Unit Commendation
- National Defense Service Medal w/1 star
- Southwest Asia Service Medal w/ 1 star
- Kuwait Liberation Medal (Kuwait)
