= Rock Creek Station =

Park in Nebraska, USA

Rock Creek Station State Historical Park
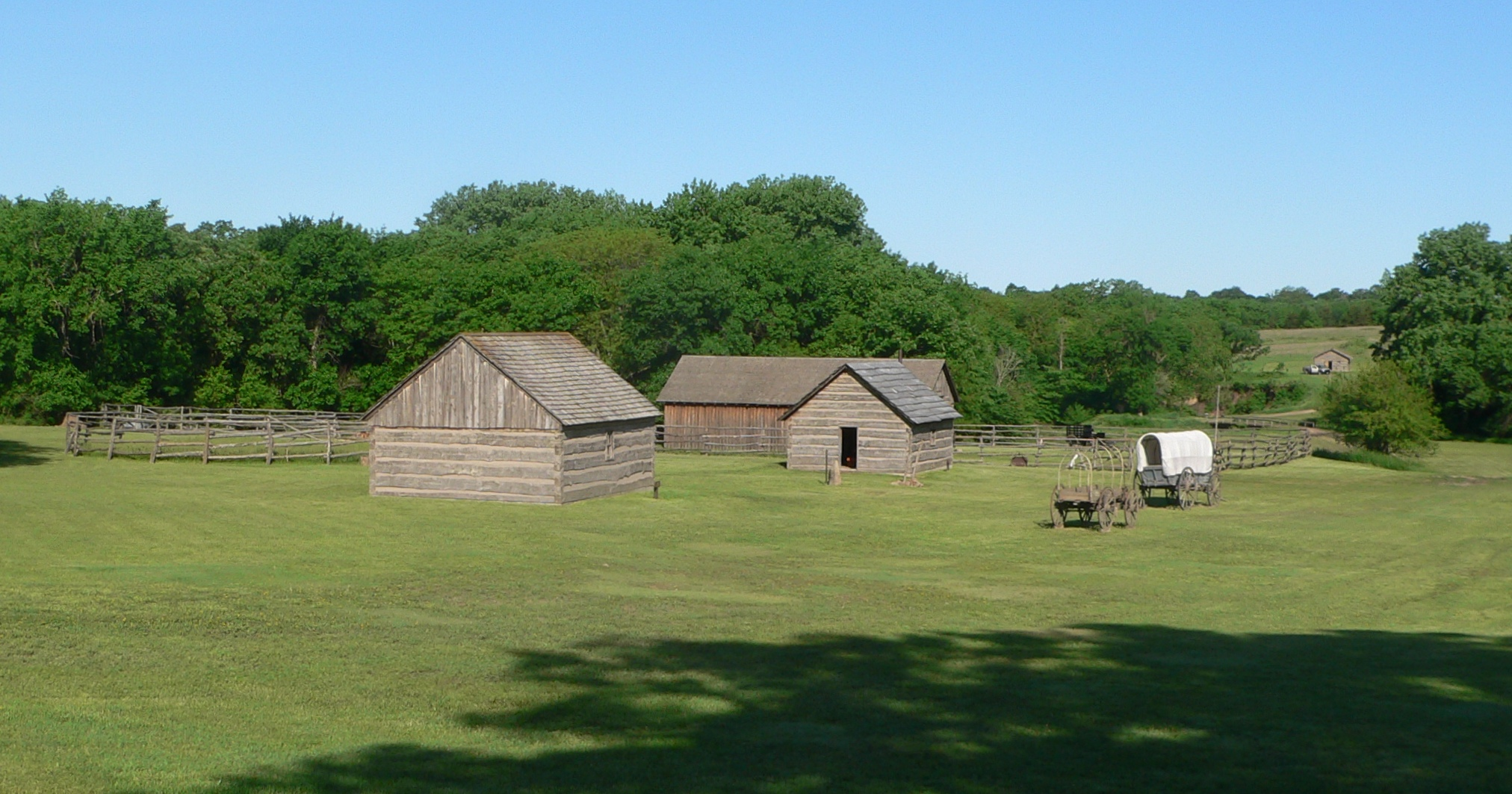
- Reconstructed buildings at East Ranch

- Location within Nebraska Location within the United States
- Location: Jefferson County, Nebraska, United States
- Nearest town: Endicott, Nebraska
- Coordinates: 40°06′50″N 97°03′51″W
- Area: 353 acres (143 ha)
- Elevation: 1,371 ft (418 m)
- Designation: Nebraska state historical park
- Established: 1980
- Administrator: Nebraska Game and Parks Commission
- Website: Rock Creek Station; State Historical Park

Rock Creek Station was a stagecoach and Pony Express station in southeastern Nebraska, three miles northeast of the present-day village of Endicott. The site is preserved as Rock Creek Station State Historical Park.

== History ==
Rock Creek Station was established in 1857 by S.C. Glenn along the Oregon Trail and California Trail, along the west bank of Rock Creek. The station was a supply center and campground for emigrants. In March 1859, the property was purchased by David McCanles and his brother, James, who added a toll bridge across Rock Creek, charging each wagon from 10¢ to 50¢ to cross the bridge depending upon their ability to pay. In 1860, McCanles built a cabin and dug a well on the east side of Rock Creek which became known as the East Ranch.

In early 1861, McCanles sold the East Ranch to the Russell, Waddell, and Majors firm, which owned and operated the Pony Express, for a cash deposit with the remainder to be paid in installments. The West Ranch continued to be used as an emigrant rest stop and the home of the McCanles family until April 1861, when McCanles sold the West Ranch to freighters Hagenstein and Wolfe and moved his family to another property three miles south of Rock Creek Station.

In July 1861, David McCanles stopped by Rock Creek Station to inquire about the status of an overdue installment. An argument ensued, and McCanles was shot and killed by a young James Butler Hickok, who later became known as Wild Bill Hickok.

== State park ==
In 1980, the Nebraska Game and Parks Commission began development of 350 acres (140 ha) as a state historical park; an adjoining 40-acre (16 ha) tract was developed as a state recreation area. Deep trail ruts can be seen in the park complex. The toll bridge and many of the station's buildings have been reconstructed; other features include a visitor center with exhibits about pioneers along the Oregon trail and Wild Bill Hickok, hiking trails, and a campground.

== See also ==
- McCanles Gang
- Landmarks of the Nebraska Territory
