= Cun =

Cun or CUN may refer to:

== Education ==
- Central University for Nationalities, later Minzu University of China, Beijing
- Consiglio Universitario Nazionale (National University Council), Italy

== People ==
- Bei Mafu Cun or Zhao She (趙奢), Chinese 3rd century BC official
- Cun Mula or Çun Mula[a] (1818–1896), Albanian tribal freedom fighter
- Fei Wo Si Cun (born 1978), the pen name of Chinese writer Ai Jingjing
- Yann Le Cun (born 1960), computer scientist

== Places ==
- Cún, a village in Hungary
- Cancún International Airport (IATA code)

== Other uses ==
- Cun (unit), a traditional Chinese unit of length
- Cun language, a Hlai language of Hainan Island
- Conn (nautical), or cun, commanding ship movements
- Villages of China (Chinese: 村, pinyin: Cūn)
- CUN the cat, official mascot of the 2018 Asia Pacific Masters Games

== See also ==
- Con (disambiguation)
