= William Cunningham (body snatcher) =

William Cunningham (c. 1807 – October 1871) was a body snatcher who lived in Cincinnati, Ohio. A "professional resurrectionist", Cunningham provided corpses for area medical doctors from 1855 to 1871. Popularly known as Old Cunny, other names attributed to Cunningham include "Old Man Dead" and "The Ghoul".

== Early life ==
Cunningham was born in Ireland, perhaps in 1807, though his age has been disputed. A coroner estimated his age as 65 at the time of death, though he was said to have self-reported his age as 50 in the 1870 US Census. He possibly lived in the state of Virginia before moving to Cincinnati. He was said to have fought in the Mexican–American War.

== Background ==
Cincinnati was considered a center for medicine in the 19th century, with thirteen medical schools operating between 1820 and 1880. Thus, there was a substantial need for corpses for anatomy lessons, but there were no legal ways for medical schools to acquire them. Prior to 1825, students generally raided cemeteries themselves, but growing demand led to the establishment of "professional resurrectionists" to acquire bodies on behalf of the schools. Taking bodies from cemeteries in Ohio was considered a felony.

== Career ==
By day, Cunningham was a wagon driver. At night, however, he was a body snatcher. He was active from 1855 to 1871. Cunningham was described by the physicians who worked with him as an expert in body snatching. To extract a body from its coffin, he would dig a 4 ft^{2} (0.37 m^{2}) hole above the head of the coffin, then break it open. He would then fasten hooks under the corpse's arms, and use rope to haul it out of the grave.

After securing a corpse, Cunningham would dress it in an old coat, hat, and vest, then prop it up in the buggy seat next to him. If he encountered others on his way to town, Cunningham would slap its face and tell it to sit up straight, acting as if he were taking a drunk friend home. He sold the corpses to area medical schools for US$30 each—equivalent to $1,037 in 2025, selling about 100 each year. Several stories were circulated about Cunningham's misdeeds, including being shot at by civilians. He was once shot in the hip for body snatching, which made him lame for the rest of his life.

He once stole the same two bodies twice. After being apprehended on Reading Road with the two corpses, he was arrested and the bodies were sent to a funeral home. The next day, the funeral home had two unassuming visitors alleging to be from the coroner's office, requesting the bodies, which were turned over. It was then discovered that the coroner's office was not in possession of the bodies and had never requested them. With the loss of the critical evidence, Cunningham and his co-conspirators were released from jail. He also shipped bodies to physicians, including as far away as Kansas.

He also maliciously spread disease, such as when he sought revenge on medical students who had played a trick on him. He intentionally delivered them a body infected with smallpox, causing several of the students to become ill.

== Later life and death ==
In August 1871, Cunningham was caught with two corpses and indicted. He died of heart disease a few months later in October, but not before he sold his body in advance to Medical College of Ohio in Cincinnati. The college displayed his skeleton afterwards, with an 1872 Cincinnati Enquirer column saying:

His ghastly skeleton, neatly articulated and wired, sits on a tombstone in the cabinet of that institution, while in his hand he grasps a spade, the emblem of his calling in life. Between his teeth he holds a short pipe as he was wont to in the days of flesh.

== Personal life ==
Cunningham was married to Mary Cunningham, who assisted him in stealing bodies. She was also Irish-born. In 1878, Mary Cunningham was arrested along with four others for snatching the body of a child and selling it to Miami Medical College.

== Legacy ==
Cunningham is considered the most infamous body snatcher in Ohio history, becoming a bogeyman used to scare misbehaving children.

== See also ==
- Burke and Hare murders
- John Scott Harrison
- Mortsafe
