= Cuny (surname) =

Cuny is a surname. Notable people with the surname include:

- Alain Cuny (1908–1994), French actor
- Albert Cuny (1869–1947), French linguist
- Fred Cuny (born 1944), American disaster relief specialist
- Richard Cuny (died 1627), Welsh politician

== See also ==
- CUNY
