= McCune =

McCune may refer to:

- McCune (surname)
- McCune, Kansas, United States, a town
- McCune, Missouri, United States, an unincorporated community
- McCune Run, a tributary of French Creek, Pennsylvania, United States
- McCune Audio/Video/Lighting, an American company
