= Endicott, Nebraska =

- Village
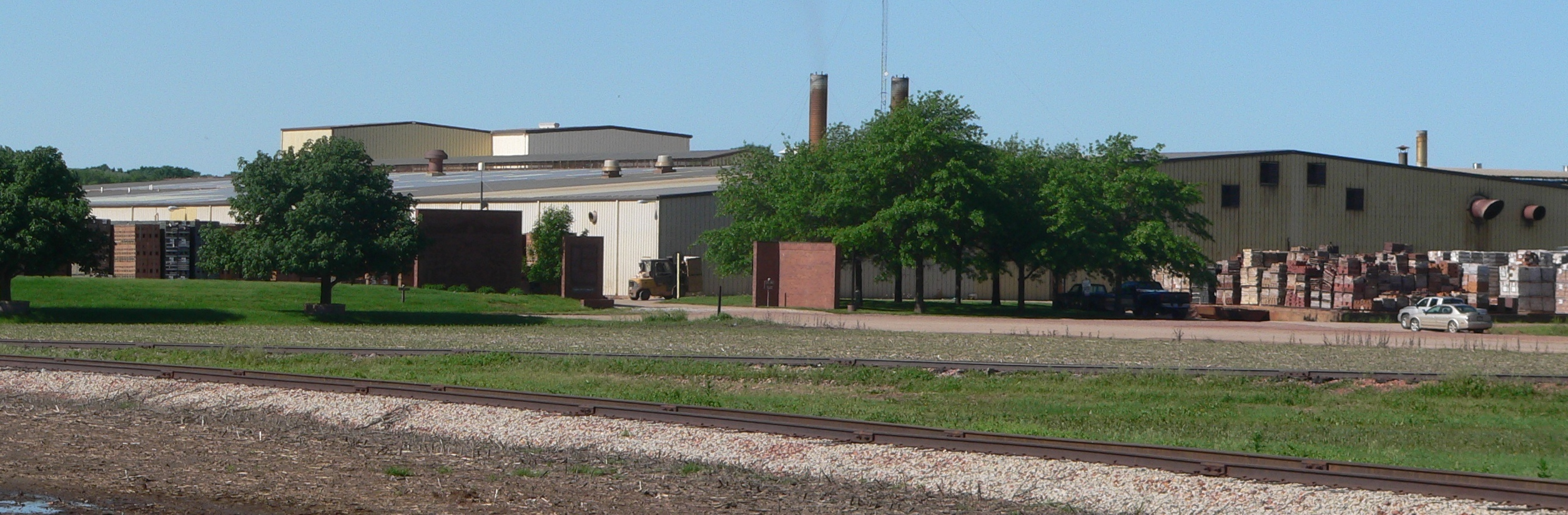
- Endicott Clay Products plant, located southwest of Endicott

- Location of Endicott, Nebraska
- Coordinates: 40°04′53″N 97°05′43″W
- Country: United States
- State: Nebraska
- County: Jefferson

Area
  - Total: 0.47 sq mi (1.21 km^{2})
  - Land: 0.46 sq mi (1.19 km^{2})
  - Water: 0.0077 sq mi (0.02 km^{2})
- Elevation: 1,309 ft (399 m)

Population (2020)
  - Total: 114
  - Estimate (2021): 112
  - Density: 246.5/sq mi (95.17/km^{2})
- Time zone: UTC-6 (Central (CST))
  - Summer (DST): UTC-5 (CDT)
- ZIP code: 68350
- Area code: 402
- FIPS code: 31-15920
- GNIS feature ID: 2398833

Endicott is a village in Jefferson County, Nebraska, United States. The population was 114 at the 2020 census.

== History ==
Endicott was platted in 1880 at the junction of the St. Joseph and Western and Chicago, Burlington and Quincy Railroads. It was named for William Crowninshield Endicott, the United States Secretary of War in the Administration of President Grover Cleveland. The Endicott family were stockholders in the Chicago, Burlington and Quincy Railroad.

== Geography ==
According to the United States Census Bureau, the village has a total area of 0.47 square miles (1.22 km^{2}), of which 0.46 square miles (1.19 km^{2}) is land and 0.01 square miles (0.03 km^{2}) is water.

== Demographics ==
Historical population
| Census | Pop. | Note | %± |
|---|---|---|---|
| 1890 | 256 | | — |
| 1900 | 234 | | −8.6% |
| 1910 | 204 | | −12.8% |
| 1920 | 197 | | −3.4% |
| 1930 | 242 | | 22.8% |
| 1940 | 246 | | 1.7% |
| 1950 | 195 | | −20.7% |
| 1960 | 166 | | −14.9% |
| 1970 | 167 | | 0.6% |
| 1980 | 198 | | 18.6% |
| 1990 | 163 | | −17.7% |
| 2000 | 139 | | −14.7% |
| 2010 | 132 | | −5.0% |
| 2020 | 113 | | −14.4% |
| 2021 (est.) | 112 | ▼ | −0.9% |
U.S. Decennial Census

=== 2010 census ===
As of the census of 2010, there were 132 people, 61 households, and 41 families residing in the village. The population density was 287.0 inhabitants per square mile (110.8/km^{2}). There were 72 housing units at an average density of 156.5 per square mile (60.4/km^{2}). The racial makeup of the village was 100.0% White. Hispanic or Latino of any race were 0.8% of the population.

There were 61 households, of which 26.2% had children under the age of 18 living with them, 54.1% were married couples living together, 6.6% had a female householder with no husband present, 6.6% had a male householder with no wife present, and 32.8% were non-families. 29.5% of all households were made up of individuals, and 13.1% had someone living alone who was 65 years of age or older. The average household size was 2.16 and the average family size was 2.61.

The median age in the village was 47.7 years. 18.2% of residents were under the age of 18; 7.5% were between the ages of 18 and 24; 19% were from 25 to 44; 35.6% were from 45 to 64; and 19.7% were 65 years of age or older. The gender makeup of the village was 51.5% male and 48.5% female.

=== 2000 census ===
As of the census of 2000, there were 139 people, 65 households, and 39 families residing in the village. The population density was 276.0 inhabitants per square mile (106.6/km^{2}). There were 72 housing units at an average density of 143.0 per square mile (55.2/km^{2}). The racial makeup of the village was 100.00% White.

There were 65 households, out of which 23.1% had children under the age of 18 living with them, 55.4% were married couples living together, 3.1% had a female householder with no husband present, and 38.5% were non-families. 33.8% of all households were made up of individuals, and 13.8% had someone living alone who was 65 years of age or older. The average household size was 2.14 and the average family size was 2.68.

In the village, the population was spread out, with 18.7% under the age of 18, 6.5% from 18 to 24, 23.7% from 25 to 44, 29.5% from 45 to 64, and 21.6% who were 65 years of age or older. The median age was 46 years. For every 100 females, there were 110.6 males. For every 100 females age 18 and over, there were 113.2 males.

As of 2000 the median income for a household in the village was $38,125, and the median income for a family was $39,500. Males had a median income of $22,083 versus $17,404 for females. The per capita income for the village was $15,649. There were 2.4% of families and 1.6% of the population living below the poverty line, including no under eighteens and none of those over 64.
