= Cassin Young =

US Navy Medal of Honor recipient (1894–1942)

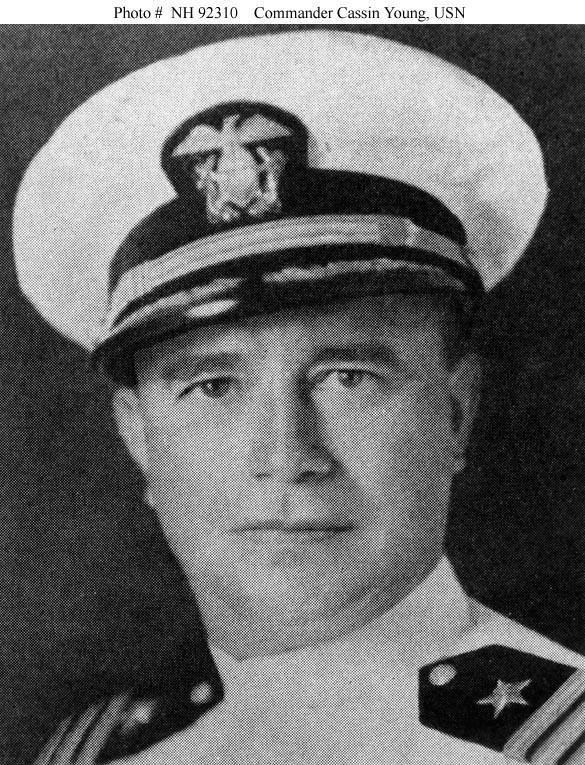
- Captain Cassin Young, USN
- Born: March 6, 1894; Washington, D.C., U.S.
- Died: November 13, 1942 (aged 48) off Guadalcanal, Solomon Islands
- Military career
- Allegiance: United States of America
- Branch: United States Navy
- Service years: 1916 - 1942
- Rank: Captain
- Commands: USS Evans; Submarine Division Seven; USS Vestal; USS San Francisco
- Conflicts: World War I World War II: Attack on Pearl Harbor; Naval Battle of Guadalcanal †
- Awards: Medal of Honor; Navy Cross; Purple Heart

Cassin Young (March 6, 1894 – November 13, 1942) was a captain in the United States Navy who received the Medal of Honor for his heroism during the attack on Pearl Harbor.

== Biography ==
Young was born in Washington, D.C., on March 6, 1894. At the age of two he moved to Milwaukee, Wisconsin, where his father operated a drug store. After graduation from the U.S. Naval Academy on June 3, 1916, he served on the battleship USS Connecticut (BB-18) into 1919. He attended submarine school in 1919 and then spent several years in subs. During that period, he served on the USS R-22 (SS-99) and USS R-3 (SS-80). In 1921, he and his family returned from Panama, and he assisted in outfitting USS S-51 (SS-162). In January 1922, he served in naval communications on the staff of Commander, Submarine Divisions, Battle Fleet, and at the Naval Academy.

During 1931 to 1933, Lieutenant Commander Young served on the battleship USS New York (BB-34). He was subsequently assigned as commanding officer of the destroyer USS Evans (DD-78) and was assigned to the Eleventh Naval District from 1935 to 1937. After promotion to the rank of commander, he commanded Submarine Division Seven and was stationed at Naval Submarine Base New London in Groton, Connecticut.

When Japan attacked Pearl Harbor on December 7, 1941, he was the commanding officer of the repair ship USS Vestal (AR-4), which was badly damaged by Japanese bombs and the explosion of the battleship USS Arizona (BB-39). Commander Young rapidly organized offensive action, personally taking charge of one of Vestal's anti-aircraft guns. When Arizona's forward magazine exploded, the blast blew Young overboard. Although stunned, he was determined to save his ship by getting her away from the blazing Arizona. Swimming through burning oil back to Vestal, which was already damaged and about to be further damaged, Young got her underway and beached her, thus ensuring her later salvage. His heroism was recognized with the Medal of Honor.

Promoted to Captain in February 1942, he took command of the heavy cruiser USS San Francisco (CA-38) on November 9, 1942. On November 13, 1942, during the Naval Battle of Guadalcanal, he guided his ship in action against a superior Japanese force and was killed by enemy shells while closely engaging the battleship Hiei. Captain Young was posthumously awarded the Navy Cross for his actions during the campaign, and San Francisco received the Presidential Unit Citation.

== Military decorations ==
Young's decorations and awards include:

Medal of Honor	Navy Cross	Purple Heart
Navy and Marine Corps Presidential Unit Citation	World War I Victory Medal	American Defense Service Medal w/ Fleet Clasp (3/16" Bronze Star)
American Campaign Medal	Asiatic-Pacific Campaign Medal w/ two 3/16" Bronze Stars	World War II Victory Medal

=== Medal of Honor citation ===
Medal of Honor citation:

For distinguished conduct in action, outstanding heroism and utter disregard of his own safety, above and beyond the call of duty, as Commanding Officer of the U.S.S. Vestal, during the attack on the Fleet in Pearl Harbor, Territory of Hawaii, by enemy Japanese forces on December 7, 1941. Commander Young proceeded to the bridge and later took personal command of the 3-inch antiaircraft gun. When blown overboard by the blast of the forward magazine explosion of the U.S.S. Arizona, to which the U.S.S. Vestal was moored, he swam back to his ship. The entire forward part of the U.S.S. Arizona was a blazing inferno with oil afire on the water between the two ships; as a result of several bomb hits, the U.S.S. Vestal was afire in several places, was settling and taking on a list. Despite severe enemy bombing and strafing at the time, and his shocking experience of having been blown overboard, Commander Young, with extreme coolness and calmness, moved his ship to an anchorage distant from the U.S.S. Arizona, and subsequently beached the U.S.S. Vestal upon determining that such action was required to save his ship.

PRESENTATION DATE & DETAILS: APRIL 18, 1942 PEARL HARBOR, TERRITORY OF HAWAII, ONBOARD THE U.S.S. VESTAL, PRESENTED BY ADM. CHESTER W. NIMITZ

Captain Young's Medal of Honor is on display at the Naval Academy Museum in Annapolis MD.

=== Navy Cross citation ===
Navy Cross citation:

For extraordinary heroism and distinguished service in the line of his profession as Commanding Officer of the Heavy Cruiser U.S.S. San Francisco, during an engagement with Japanese naval forces near Savo Island on the night of 12–13 November 1942. On this occasion the force to which Captain Young was attached engaged at close quarters and defeated a superior enemy force, inflicting heavy damage upon them and preventing the accomplishment of their intended mission. This daring and intrepid attack, brilliantly executed, led to a great victory for his country's forces. By his indomitable fighting spirit, expert seamanship, and gallant devotion to duty, Captain Young contributed largely to the success of the battle and upheld the highest traditions of the United States Naval Service. He gallantly gave his life for his country.

== Namesake ==
In 1943, the destroyer USS Cassin Young (DD-793) was named in his honor. This famous destroyer has been restored and is now berthed at the Charlestown Navy Yard in Boston Harbor, across from the USS Constitution.

== See also ==
- List of Medal of Honor recipients
