= Conn (nautical) =

Naval officer assigned to give orders to the helm

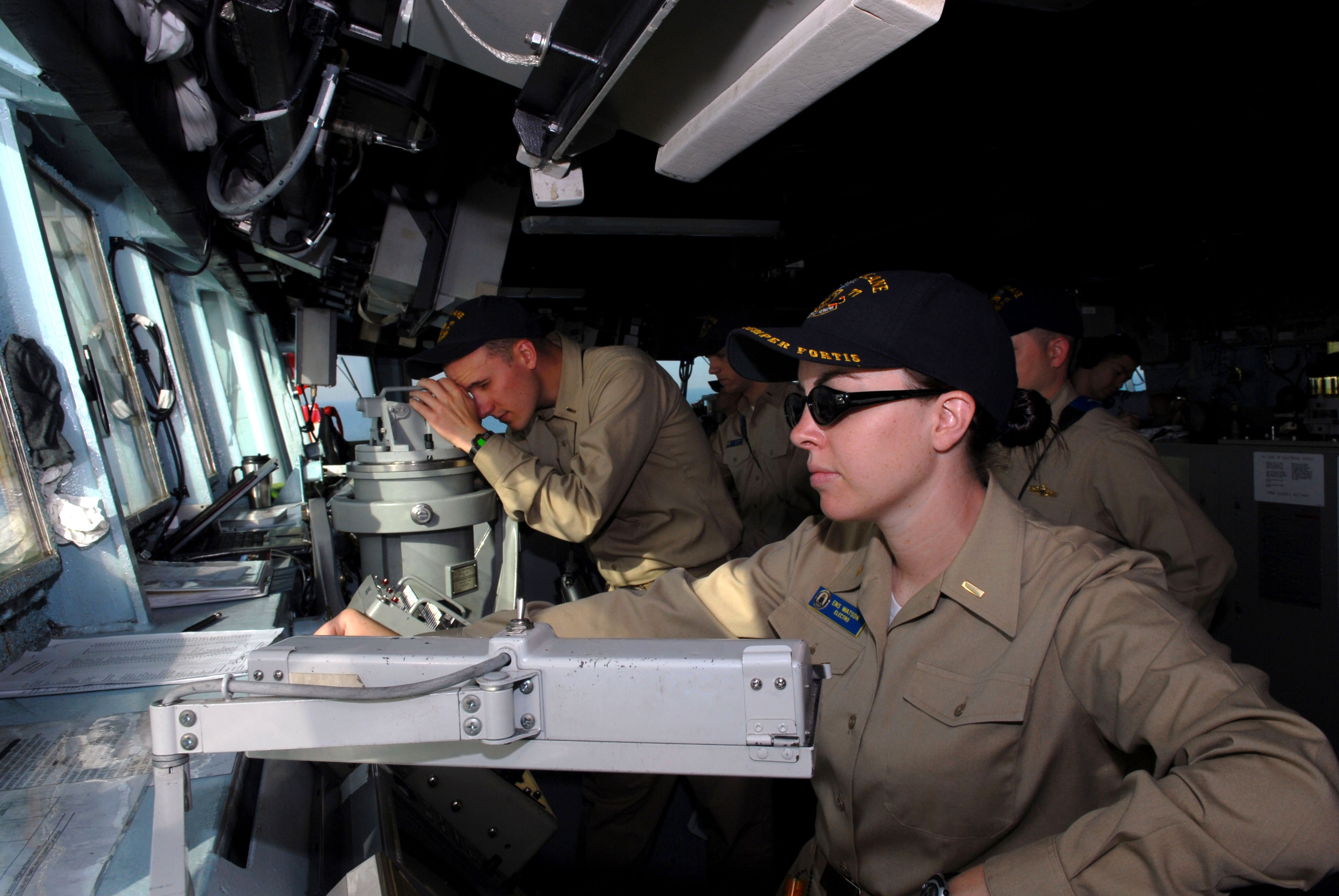
An ensign stands conning officer watch on the bridge of the Arleigh Burke-class destroyer USS O'Kane

The conn (also con) is the status of being in control of a ship's movements while at sea. The following quote summarizes the use of the term:

One of the most important principles of ship handling is that there be no ambiguity as to who is controlling the movements of the ship. One person gives orders to the ship's engine, rudder, lines, and ground tackle. This person is said to have the "conn."

— James Alden Barber, 2005, "Introduction", The Naval Shiphandler's Guide, p. 8. Mark B. Templeton

"Conn" is also a verb describing the act of controlling a ship.

Within the U.S. Coast Guard, Shipyard and U.S. Navy, the captain of a vessel typically selects a junior officer to perform the role of conning for him or her. Such an individual has the title of "officer of the deck" (abbreviated OOD) or "the conning officer" while on duty, and he or she will stand watches at four-hour intervals carrying out the captain's commands. However, the captain can immediately take the conn by simply issuing an order to the helm. On navy ships, neither the ship's navigator nor the ship's pilot is usually the conning officer, whereas on merchant ships the conning officer may be the captain, the deck officer or the pilot. The officer of the deck may give the conn to a junior officer for training purposes, in which case the officer of the deck and the conning officer may not be the same individual (the officer who has the deck retains responsibility for the ship's safe passage; the conning officer only has responsibility for giving the helm instructions on direction and thrust of the ship's engines).

It is from this term that the concept of a conning tower, an elevated platform from which a conning officer can view all aspects of a ship's movement, is derived.

The naval term "conn" may derive from the Middle English conne (study, become acquainted with) or the French conduire via the Latin conducere (conduct). Though the origin of the term is not entirely clear, the term is most frequently used as a transitive verb, i.e., to "conn" (therefore conduct) a ship.
