= 1996 Summer Olympics torch relay =

- Host city: Atlanta, Georgia, United States
- Countries visited: Greece, United States
- Distance: 26,875 kilometers (16,699 mi)
- Torchbearers: 12,467
- Start date: April 27, 1996
- End date: July 19, 1996
- Torch designer: Peter Mastrogiannis, Malcolm Grear Designers

The 1996 Summer Olympics torch relay was run from April 27 to July 19, leading up to the 1996 Summer Olympics in Atlanta. The route covered 26,875 kilometers (16,699 mi) across the United States and featured a wide variety in the methods of transport used, including bicycles, boats, and trains. The National Pony Express Association participated in the journey, with riders carrying the torch for over 56 continuous hours. The torch was taken on board a replica of a 19th-century packet boat and pulled for 3.2 kilometers (2.0 mi) along the Erie Canal by mule. The torch was also carried into space for the first time, with astronauts taking an unlit torch with them aboard Space Shuttle Columbia as part of STS-78. The relay involved over 12,000 torchbearers, including Muhammad Ali, who was chosen to ignite the Olympic cauldron.

== Organization ==
Planning for the torch relay began in 1993. From the beginning of the planning process, the Atlanta Committee for the Olympic Games (ACOG) worked closely with the Hellenic Olympic Committee (HOC) to organize the handover of the Olympic flame from Greece to the United States. The last such event in the United States, the 1984 Summer Olympics torch relay, had been the subject of controversy: Greek organizers opposed the decision to allow anyone who gave money to the relay's charitable sponsors to carry the torch, and had threatened not to light the flame at Olympia. Additionally, Athens had narrowly lost to Atlanta in its bid for the 1996 Olympics, which many Greek officials believed belonged to them because it marked the 100th anniversary of the first modern Olympics in Athens. Atlanta organizers sought to minimize the impact of these events on Greek–American relations by ensuring that the HOC was always included in their plans. As a result of these discussions, ACOG agreed to "refrain from selling the honor of carrying the Olympic flame, to control and minimize commercialization of the flame or relay imagery, to prohibit any sponsor identification from appearing on the torch or torchbearer uniform, and to protect and acknowledge only one Olympic flame."

Within those constraints, the relay still relied substantially on corporate sponsorship as opposed to public funding. Most of these sponsorships were value-in-kind, with sponsors providing free products and services to the relay organizers rather than paying money to ACOG. The Coca-Cola Company was the presenting sponsor of the relay, and was the only company permitted to create relay-related merchandise and advertising. Coca-Cola was also responsible for selecting 2,500 of the torchbearers. The company gave nomination forms away as part of a promotional deal with 12-packs of their cans, with the entries largely being selected at random. Revenue from the drinks sold from the travelling party were donated to charity.

Transportation services, both for the flame itself and for relay organizers making preparations along the route, were provided by Delta Air Lines, Union Pacific Railroad, and BMW, with Texaco providing fuel for the motor vehicles used in the relay. Communications and technology services were provided by BellSouth, Motorola, and IBM. The torchbearer uniforms were designed and manufactured by the Sara Lee Corporation, which then owned the Hanes and Champion clothing brands. Holiday Inn provided accommodations and meeting spaces for organizers along the route. Troopers of the Georgia State Patrol accompanied the flame along the entire route and guarded it overnight.

In planning the flame's route across the United States, organizers drew on the successful experience of the 1984 relay as well as the 1992 relay in Spain, which had used a wider variety of means of transportation in addition to runners on foot. Combining elements of these two past events would allow for a "celebration of Americana" that would visit significantly more towns and famous locations than the 1984 relay, done solely by runners, in almost exactly the same span of time. For the first time, logistics and planning for the relay was handled by Além International Management, which has been responsible for almost all Olympic torch relays since 1996 and has followed the same model each time. A preliminary route had been decided by early 1994, and organizer Rennie Truitt was tasked with driving its entire length that summer to choose specific roads and landmarks that would be visited.

The route of the torch relay was announced on July 23, 1995, in a televised special on NBC hosted by Bob Costas and ACOG president Billy Payne. It was the longest Olympic torch relay route that had been staged up to that time, covering a distance of 15,000 miles (24,000 km), visiting 42 of the 50 states, and lasting for 84 days. The length was chosen so that the Olympic flame would burn in the United States for a total of 100 days from its arrival in Los Angeles to its extinguishing at the closing ceremonies, representing the Centennial Olympics. The flame was to be carried by 10,000 torchbearers. 5,500 of these torchbearers were chosen by local affiliates of the United Way of America, with another 2,500 chosen through a sweepstakes held by Coca-Cola, and the remaining 2,000 selected by the U.S. Olympic Committee and ACOG.

== Torch ==
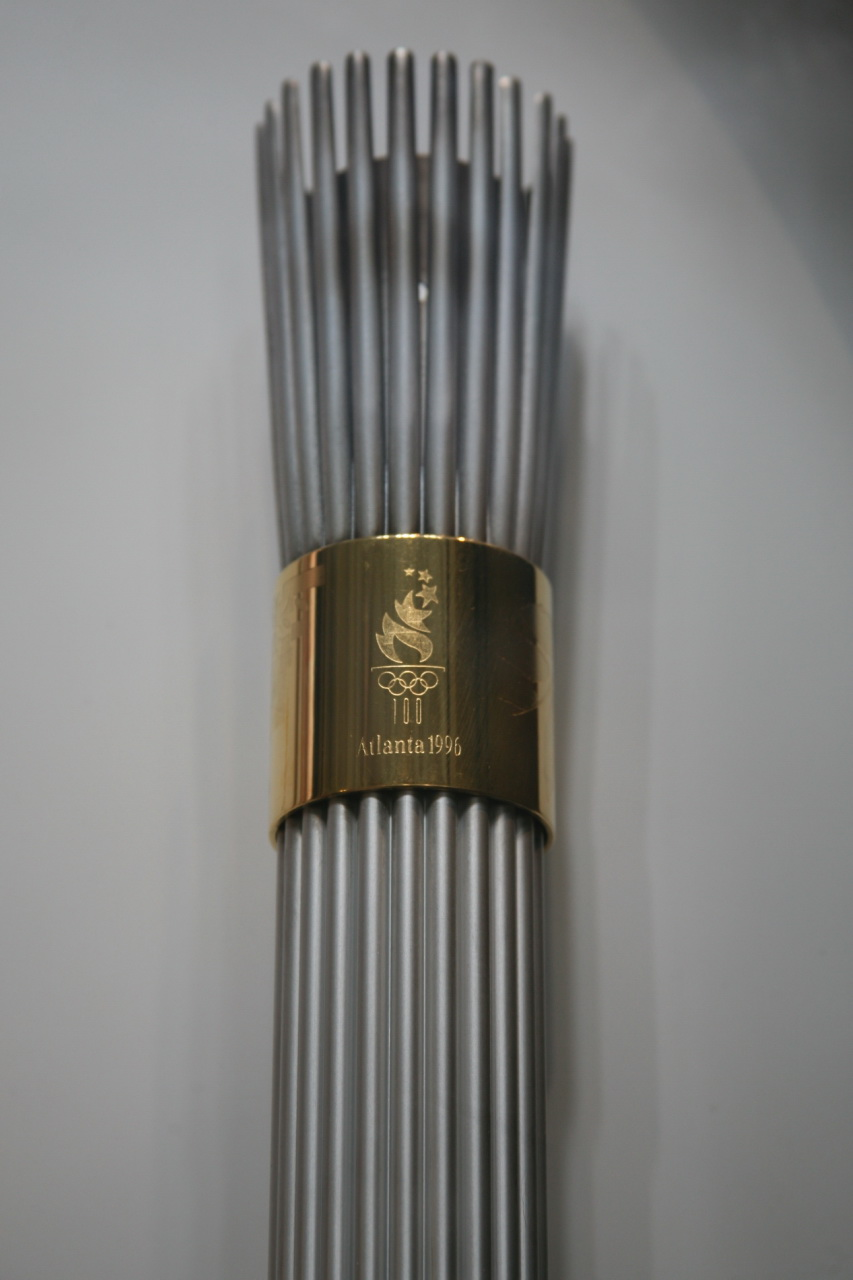
Top section of a torch showing the logo of the 1996 Games

The torch was designed by Greek-American Peter Mastrogiannis of Malcolm Grear Designers. The Georgia Institute of Technology College of Engineering and Atlanta Gas Light turned the design into a reality. It featured 22 aluminum "reeds", representing the number of times that the Games had been held. A gold-plated band towards the base of the torch features the names of all 20 host cities up to and including Atlanta, while the logo is etched into another band near the top. The handle, made of Georgia hardwood collected by the Georgia Forestry Commission and manufactured by Hillerich & Bradsby, maker of Louisville Slugger bats, is found near the center of the 76 centimeters (30 in) torch. In total it weighed 1,600 grams (56 oz). Torchbearers were allowed to purchase for $275 the torch that they had carried.

During the initial leg of the torch relay in Greece, hasty modifications were made to the design of the torch. It was found that the reeds could melt while the flame was lit, requiring engineers to design a screen which could protect the reeds from the flame without affecting the performance of the torch. The propane used to fuel the torch was replaced with propylene so that it would burn brighter, requiring the thousands of torches already made to be disassembled in order to replace the fuel inside.

== Relay ==
=== Greece ===
In keeping with tradition, the flame was lit at the Temple of Hera in the Greek city of Olympia on March 30, 1996. First Lady Hillary Clinton headed the American delegation at the lighting ceremony. Greek long jumper Kostas Koukodimos was the first torchbearer. Over 800 people carried the torch a distance of 2,141 kilometers (1,330 mi) across Greece, the most extensive in the history of the Games, to mark the 100th anniversary of the 1896 Olympics in Athens. The Greek leg of the relay culminated on April 6, when the torch arrived at Panathenaic Stadium in Athens. The flame was carried through Athens by representatives of every country which had hosted an Olympic Games in the past century.

Date	Locations	Map	Inset map
March 30	Olympia, Pyrgos, Kalamata	1996 Summer Olympics torch relay is located in Greece	1996 Summer Olympics torch relay is located in Peloponnese
March 31	Kalamata, Taygetus, Sparta, Tegea	1996 Summer Olympics torch relay is located in Greece	1996 Summer Olympics torch relay is located in Peloponnese
April 1	Tegea, Tripoli, Nafplio, Argos, Corinth	1996 Summer Olympics torch relay is located in Greece	1996 Summer Olympics torch relay is located in Peloponnese
April 2	Corinth, Patras	1996 Summer Olympics torch relay is located in Greece	1996 Summer Olympics torch relay is located in Peloponnese
April 3	Patras, Missolonghi, Navpaktos, Galaxidi, Itea, Amfissa, Delphi	1996 Summer Olympics torch relay is located in Greece	1996 Summer Olympics torch relay is located in Peloponnese
April 4	Delphi, Parnassus, Thebes, Vergina	1996 Summer Olympics torch relay is located in Greece	1996 Summer Olympics torch relay is located in Peloponnese
April 5	Vergina, Naousa, Pella, Thessaloniki	1996 Summer Olympics torch relay is located in Greece	1996 Summer Olympics torch relay is located in Peloponnese
April 6	Thessaloniki, Marathon, Athens (Panathenaic Stadium)	1996 Summer Olympics torch relay is located in Greece	1996 Summer Olympics torch relay is located in Peloponnese

=== United States ===
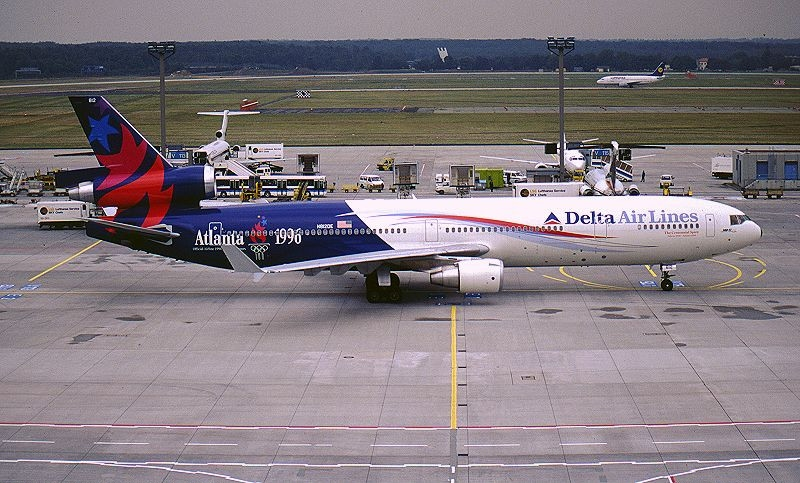
The Centennial Spirit, Delta Air Lines' specially painted McDonnell Douglas MD-11 that was used to transport the flame from Athens to Los Angeles.

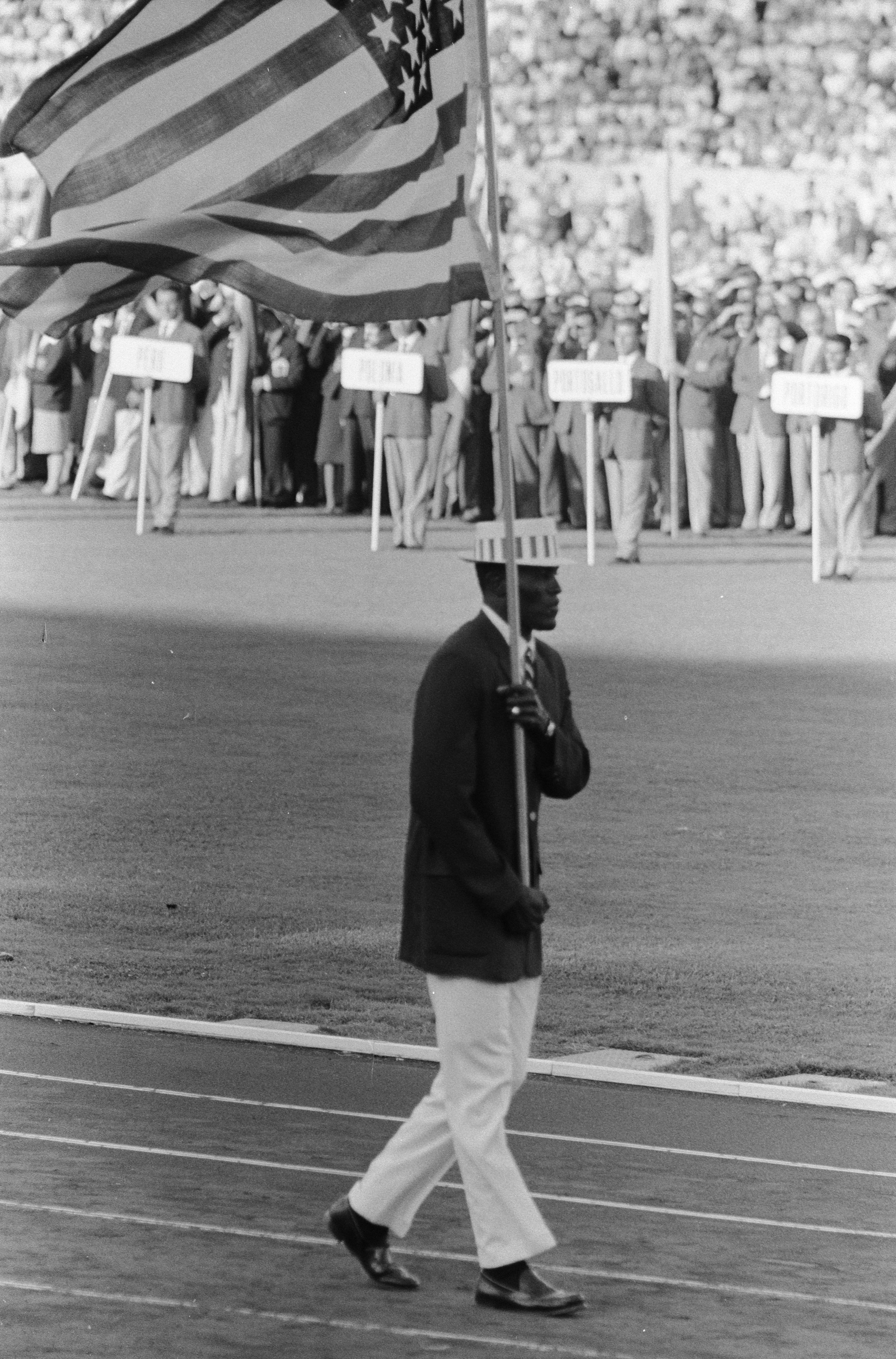
Rafer Johnson, pictured as a flagbearer at the 1960 Summer Olympics, was the first torchbearer.

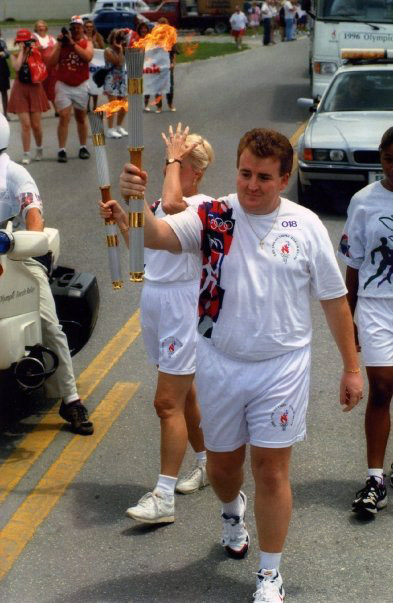
A runner carrying the torch near Tampa, Florida

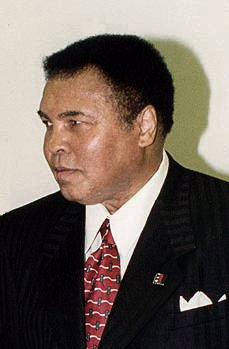
Muhammad Ali, the surprise final torchbearer, pictured in 2004

After burning in Athens for three weeks, HOC president Antonios Tzikas formally handed the flame to ACOG president Billy Payne on April 26. A lantern containing the flame was loaded onto The Centennial Spirit, a specially painted Delta Air Lines McDonnell Douglas MD-11, at Athens' Ellinikon International Airport early on the morning of April 27. The flight from Athens to Los Angeles International Airport lasted 14 hours, departing Athens at 4 a.m. local time and arriving in Los Angeles by 9 a.m. local time.

From the airport, the flame was carried in a helicopter to Los Angeles Memorial Coliseum, site of the 1984 Olympic opening and closing ceremonies, for a nationally televised ceremony to mark the beginning of the relay. ACOG attempted to arrange for the nude statues in front of the Coliseum to be covered during the event, but the statues ultimately remained uncovered. Billy Payne lit the first torch from the lantern before passing it to Rafer Johnson, who had lit the cauldron in 1984, to run the first leg. Johnson passed the flame to Gina Hemphill Tillman, granddaughter of Jesse Owens, who had been the first torchbearer on the 1984 relay. Tillman passed it on to swimmer Janet Evans.

Leaving the Coliseum, the torch was carried through Los Angeles to Santa Monica Pier, then along the Pacific coast. At one point in Los Angeles, the torch was carried by Robert Zemeckis. The first day of the relay continued until 4:59 a.m., when the run stopped for an hour in Huntington Beach before continuing on its way to San Diego. Notable torchbearers in San Diego County included Wheel of Fortune hosts Pat Sajak and Vanna White in Oceanside and 1936 Olympic athlete Kenny Griffin in Carlsbad.

After roughly following the Mexican border to Yuma, Arizona, the torch made its first rail journey to Phoenix. Security was high, as an act of sabotage along the same tracks six months earlier had caused the deadly 1995 Palo Verde derailment. In Kingman, Arizona, the route briefly followed the famous Route 66, before exiting the state at the Hoover Dam. It was carried across the rim of the dam by Martha Watson. That morning, to mark the torch's passage, the world's largest U.S. flag was unfurled for the first time across the dam's wall, but it had to be taken down due to high winds before the torch arrived.

The relay proceeded into Las Vegas, Nevada, where it was announced that the casinos would briefly dim their lights to create a more dramatic entrance for the torch, but did not ultimately do so. From Las Vegas, the flame was again loaded onto a special Union Pacific train which brought it across California, with occasional stops to run through larger cities, until it reached San Jose. The torch was carried on a cable car in San Francisco and was run across the Golden Gate Bridge before dawn the next morning. After running to Sacramento, the torch made another rail journey to Eugene, Oregon. The route continued northward, on foot and by bicycle, through Portland and as far north as Seattle, Washington, where the torch crossed Puget Sound on the Seattle–Bremerton ferry, the only ferry ride along the cross-country route. Cyclist Harley Sheffield dropped and broke the torch while riding with it across the Tacoma Narrows Bridge, an incident which received so much publicity that Sheffield was featured as a guest on The Tonight Show with Jay Leno. Dana Lough, a wheelchair-using torchbearer in Seattle, sustained a serious head injury when her chair was improperly secured on a shuttle bus transporting runners after the relay.

From Seattle, the flame traveled to the southeast by train. ACOG president Billy Payne joined the railway journey in Yakima, Washington. The torch then passed through Idaho on its way to Salt Lake City, Utah, which was awarded the 2002 Winter Olympics shortly before the route was announced. Bart Conner and Nadia Comăneci, Olympic gymnasts who had recently married, carried the torch in Salt Lake City. After crossing Wyoming, the relay visited Denver, Colorado and Colorado Springs, home of the United States Olympic Committee headquarters and the U.S. Olympic Training Center.

At Julesburg, the torch was picked up by riders of the National Pony Express Association, who carried it (along with a bag of commemorative letters addressed to patients at a children's hospital) on horseback to St. Joseph, Missouri. Like the original Pony Express, the riders traveled non-stop for 58 hours straight, from 9 p.m. on May 13 to 7 a.m. on May 16. While relay organizers had chosen this particular segment of the historic Pony Express route because it mostly ran alongside modern roads which could accommodate the caravan of support vehicles, road conditions forced them to separate from the torch-bearing riders for some stretches. At Rock Creek Station near Endicott, a horse was spooked and threw its rider, causing another torch to be broken.

The torch traveled southward from St. Joseph into Kansas City, Missouri, then across Kansas and Oklahoma. The relay route, as initially announced, included a stop in Yale, Oklahoma, which organizers described as the "birthplace" of Jim Thorpe. Thorpe was actually born in Pottawatomie County, Oklahoma, near the town of Prague, and about 50 miles away from Yale, where Thorpe lived briefly as an adult. Residents of Prague protested the decision and asked for the torch to be rerouted to their town. The relay organizers resisted these requests at first, saying that the route had already been carefully planned and could not be significantly altered, but ultimately agreed to visit both Yale and Prague.

In Oklahoma City, the torch was carried by first responders to the Oklahoma City bombing a year earlier. Between Waco and Bryan, Texas, it was flown on a 1943 Stearman biplane.

In Houston, the route met the Gulf Coast and continued eastward. A 310,000 US gallons (1,200,000 L; 260,000 imp gal) gasoline spillage in Gramercy, Louisiana, forced the relay to skip the town and take an unexpected 15-mile (24 km) detour along Interstate 10. The torch rode on the historic St. Charles Streetcar in New Orleans. Sister Helen Prejean ran with the torch in New Orleans.

From New Orleans, the torch was transported mostly by rail through Mississippi and Arkansas, passing through Memphis and roughly following the Mississippi River northward. Starting from the Gateway Arch in St. Louis, the torch was intended to board the American Queen, the recently built river steamboat which was the largest of its kind in history, to be transported up the Mississippi to Hannibal, Missouri, best known as the boyhood home of Mark Twain. However, due to flooding on the river that prevented the American Queen from reaching St. Louis for the journey, an alternative route had to be devised that would still allow the torch and hundreds of honored guests to spend a day on the river. As a result, after reaching St. Louis, the torch was driven on a bus back down to Paducah, Kentucky, then rode on the American Queen from Paducah to Cairo, Illinois, before being bussed again to Hannibal.

The relay crossed Iowa and reached as far north as Minneapolis in its zig-zagging route, before making another rail journey southeastward across Wisconsin to Chicago, where it was estimated that over 500,000 spectators lined the streets. The torch proceeded through Indianapolis, Indiana and Louisville, Kentucky, where University of Kentucky basketball coach Rick Pitino carried it across the George Rogers Clark Memorial Bridge. Pitino's appearance was delayed due to a bomb threat made against the event, thought to have been made by a person angered by Pitino's recent decision to stay with the team rather than accept an offer to coach the New Jersey Nets.

A stop in Wilmington, Ohio marked the official halfway point of the torch's 84-day journey. Wendy's founder Dave Thomas carried the torch in the Columbus area. The American Republic, an iron ore-carrying lake freighter, ferried the flame from Philip A. Hart Plaza in Detroit, down the Detroit River and across Lake Erie to the Rock and Roll Hall of Fame in Cleveland.

The torch's planned route took it briefly through Cattaraugus Reservation land in the hamlet of Irving, New York. However, the torch's passage was controversial among members of the Seneca Nation of New York, as the tribe had not been consulted about the event, and as some were displeased by the Olympics' association with the Atlanta Braves and their "tomahawk chop" ritual. Dennis Bowen, the president of the Seneca Nation, said that when the torch runner entered the reservation, members of the tribe would throw a bucket of water on it to douse the flame, then relight the torch with a flame of their own, to draw attention to the plight of Indigenous peoples around the world. The relay organizers defused the controversy by having two young Senecas carry the torch across their land.

A mule-drawn packet boat was used to carry the torch down a short segment of the Erie Canal in Camillus, New York. After passing through Vermont and New Hampshire, the relay followed the course of the Boston Marathon in eastern Massachusetts, and the torch was carried along that stretch by experienced marathoners that included Johnny Kelley, Bill Rodgers, and Bobbi Gibb (the first woman to run the Boston Marathon, without permission, in 1966). On the steps of the Massachusetts State House, the flame was passed to Nancy Kerrigan.

In New York City, the torch was carried by Katie Couric in a live segment on The Today Show, then placed on a Circle Line ferry which passed by the Statue of Liberty on its way to Jersey City, New Jersey. On its arrival in Philadelphia, a torchbearer climbed the Rocky Steps leading to the Philadelphia Museum of Art. In Washington, D.C., the torch was met on the steps of the U.S. Capitol by Georgia's congressional delegation, including Speaker of the House Newt Gingrich. After Gallaudet University president I. King Jordan handed the torch to President Bill Clinton, the flame rested for the night at the White House. It was intended to burn in a cauldron on the White House lawn overnight, but due to a thunderstorm, it was kept in a lantern on the South Portico instead. The next morning, Clinton handed the torch to Olympic basketball player Carla McGhee. Leaving Washington, D.C., for Virginia, the torch was carried across the grounds of Mount Vernon by descendants of George Washington and of a person who had been enslaved at the plantation.

After crossing Virginia and North Carolina, the torch was hidden from view in the suburbs of Greenville, South Carolina after the county passed a controversial resolution decrying homosexuality (see § Anti-gay resolutions controversy). Olympic basketball player and coach Pat Summitt brought the flame into World's Fair Park in Knoxville, Tennessee. Country singer Billy Ray Cyrus carried the torch in Hermitage. In Oakville, Alabama, the hometown of Jesse Owens, the passage of the torch coincided with the unveiling of Jesse Owens Memorial Park. Former Atlanta mayor Andrew Young carried the torch across the Edmund Pettus Bridge in Selma, Alabama; Young had been among the organizers working in Selma when Bloody Sunday occurred at the bridge in 1965. The relay route roughly followed that of the subsequent Selma to Montgomery marches on its way to Alabama's state capital.

The Peregrine, a racing sailboat, carried the torch across Tampa Bay from Tampa to St. Petersburg. The next day, on the Fourth of July, the flame was flown in a 1944 Short Sunderland flying boat seaplane from Sarasota to the former seaplane terminal that had since become Miami City Hall. Dan Marino carried the torch in Fort Lauderdale. An unlit torch was carried aboard Space Shuttle Columbia during the STS-78 mission, which landed at Kennedy Space Center a few hours before the relay visited the site on its way to Orlando.

In Jacksonville, the torch boarded a Coast Guard Cutter which ferried it to a Coast Guard station near Tybee Island, Georgia. A helicopter carried it from there to Fort Pulaski National Monument, where it was placed on a replica of the schooner America and sailed into the city of Savannah. A smaller vessel captained by Olympic sailor Hal Haenel brought it to the Waving Girl Landing along Savannah's River Street, handing the torch to his sailing partner Mark Reynolds. The ceremony marking the torch's entrance into the host state of Georgia was headlined by Billy Payne and Georgia governor Zell Miller. The relay then followed a circuitous route within Georgia, leaving the state only once to briefly visit the Ocoee Whitewater Center in Tennessee. The torch spent more time in Georgia than any other state, traveling nearly 24 hours per day, and visited 90 of its 159 counties.

Former U.S. president Jimmy Carter was originally slated to carry the torch in his hometown of Plains, Georgia on July 12, but his inclusion was criticized by some Olympic advocates, given that Carter had led the 1980 Summer Olympics boycott against the Soviet Union while he was president. However, Carter later canceled his participation, choosing to accept an award from Lions Clubs International in Montreal that day instead. Billy Payne carried the torch at his alma mater, the University of Georgia in Athens. The torch visited the site of New Echota, the historic capital of the Cherokee Nation before its forced removal from Georgia. A planned visit to the Olympic Village on the Georgia Tech campus on the morning of the opening ceremony was canceled to avoid disrupting preparations for the Games themselves, and because President Clinton was visiting the village on that same day.

=== Anti-gay resolutions controversy ===
In August 1993, the County Commission of Cobb County, Georgia approved a resolution which condemned "the gay lifestyle" and stated that it was incompatible with the "community standards" and "family values" of the county. In response to the resolution, protestors called for Olympic organizers to move the volleyball preliminaries which had been scheduled to take place at the Cobb Galleria Centre in Cobb County to another venue elsewhere. ACOG agreed to move the events to Athens. When the torch relay route was later announced, it avoided Cobb County entirely, thus excluding the northwestern suburbs of Atlanta, including Marietta and Mableton, from the event. Speaker of the House Newt Gingrich, Cobb County's congressional representative, said of the decision that "the homosexual demonstrators blackmailed the Olympic committee".

The County Council of Greenville County, South Carolina passed a similar resolution on May 21, 1996, describing advocacy for gay rights as "assaults on those community standards which further the protection of the public's safety, health and welfare" and homosexuality as being "incompatible with the standards to which this community subscribes". At the time the resolution was passed, the torch relay was already underway and was scheduled for a major celebration and overnight stop in Greenville on June 25 and 26. As a result, the relay through Greenville County was altered. Upon reaching the Greenville County line, the flame was returned to its lantern and driven in the back of a van to the Greenville city limits, and it could not be seen by those who gathered along the route. Inside the city of Greenville, the relay proceeded on foot as normal, although the flame's planned overnight stay at a Holiday Inn outside the city limits was canceled. The next day, upon leaving Greenville city limits, the flame was concealed again until it reached the North Carolina state line.

=== Opening ceremony ===
The relay culminated in the 1996 Summer Olympics opening ceremony, at midnight on July 19–20, 1996 in Atlanta's Centennial Olympic Stadium. Four-time gold medal-winning discus thrower Al Oerter carried the torch to the stadium, passing it to Evander Holyfield. Holyfield was then joined by Voula Patoulidou and the pair passed the flame to American swimmer Janet Evans, the penultimate torchbearer, who carried it around a lap of the track and up a long ramp leading towards the northern end of the stadium.

The identity of the final torchbearer had been kept secret and was only revealed when Muhammad Ali appeared at the top of the ramp. Ali, who had won boxing gold as an 18-year-old at the 1960 Games in Rome and later developed Parkinson's disease, lit a mechanical torch which then travelled along a wire, lighting the cauldron at the top of a 116-foot (35 m) tower. His appearance has been referred to as being one of the most inspiring, poignant, and emotional moments in Olympic history.

== Route in the United States ==
Route segments in red were run on foot, in blue were covered by bicycle, and in black using other modes of transportation (usually motorcycle, otherwise see table below). Boundaries between modes of transportation are approximate. Transportation to and from hotels for overnight stay is not shown.

In the table and inset maps below, only those locations where the torch was carried on foot, or otherwise stopped for a celebration, are shown. The final major stop on each day of the relay is labeled with the name of the city and indicated by a larger marker; otherwise, only major cities are labeled. All locations are confirmed by the relay's official website as archived in December 1996, unless otherwise specified.

Date	Locations	Map
April 27	California: Los Angeles (Memorial Coliseum, Koreatown, Chinatown, Elysian Park), Burbank, Los Angeles (Hollywood, Mann's Chinese Theatre), West Hollywood, Beverly Hills, Los Angeles (UCLA), Santa Monica (Santa Monica Pier), Venice, Manhattan Beach, Hermosa Beach, Redondo Beach, Torrance, Wilmington, Long Beach, Seal Beach, Sunset Beach, Huntington Beach	1996 Summer Olympics torch relay is located in southern California
April 28	California: Huntington Beach, Newport Beach, Laguna Beach, Dana Point, San Clemente, Camp Pendleton, Oceanside, Carlsbad, Encinitas, Solana Beach, Del Mar, San Diego (Torrey Pines, La Jolla, Pacific Beach, Belmont Park, Mission Hills), Chula Vista (United States Olympic Training Center)	1996 Summer Olympics torch relay is located in southern California
April 29	California: Chula Vista (rowed across Lower Otay Reservoir), Calexico Arizona: Yuma	1996 Summer Olympics torch relay is located in Arizona
April 30	Arizona: Yuma, travel by train through Avondale to Phoenix (Union Station, Arizona State Capitol, Patriots Square Park), Peoria, Sun City, El Mirage, Surprise, Wickenburg, Kingman	1996 Summer Olympics torch relay is located in Arizona
May 1	Arizona: Kingman, Hoover Dam Nevada: Hoover Dam, Boulder City, Henderson, Las Vegas (University of Nevada at Las Vegas, Fremont Street), overnight travel by train to Barstow, California	1996 Summer Olympics torch relay is located in California
May 2	California: traveling by train, with stops in Barstow, Santa Barbara, San Luis Obispo, Salinas, San Jose (San Jose State University)	1996 Summer Olympics torch relay is located in California
May 3	California: San Jose, Santa Clara (Santa Clara University), Sunnyvale, Mountain View, Atherton, Redwood City, San Carlos, Belmont, San Mateo, Foster City, Burlingame, Millbrae, San Bruno, South San Francisco, Colma, Daly City, San Francisco (San Francisco State University, Kezar Stadium, Haight-Ashbury, The Castro, Mission Dolores Park, rode on a cable car, Lombard Street, Justin Herman Plaza)	1996 Summer Olympics torch relay is located in California
May 4	California: San Francisco (Fisherman's Wharf, San Francisco, Fort Mason, Palace of Fine Arts, Fort Point, Golden Gate Bridge), Sausalito, Mill Valley, Larkspur, San Rafael, Napa, Winters, Davis, Sacramento (California State Capitol, Sutter's Fort), traveling by train with stops in Marysville, Yuba City, Chico, Redding, on its way to Klamath Falls, Oregon	1996 Summer Olympics torch relay is located in California
May 5	Oregon: Klamath Falls, traveling by train through Springfield to Eugene (University of Oregon), Corvallis, Portland	1996 Summer Olympics torch relay is located in Oregon
May 6	Oregon: Portland, St. Helens Washington: Longview, Castle Rock, Chehalis, Centralia, Tenino, Olympia (Washington State Capitol)	1996 Summer Olympics torch relay is located in Washington (state)
May 7	Washington: Olympia, Lacey, Tacoma (University of Puget Sound), Gig Harbor, Bremerton, ferry across Puget Sound to Seattle (Kingdome, University of Washington, Seattle Center, KeyArena)	1996 Summer Olympics torch relay is located in Washington (state)
May 8	Washington: Renton, Enumclaw, Buckley, Eatonville, Morton, Yakima, traveling by train with stops in Kennewick and Pendleton, Oregon, continuing overnight into Idaho	1996 Summer Olympics torch relay is located in Washington (state)
May 9	Idaho: traveling by train, with stops in Boise (Idaho State Capitol), Mountain Home, and Pocatello (Idaho State University) Utah: traveling by train to Ogden	1996 Summer Olympics torch relay is located in Idaho
May 10	Utah: Ogden, South Ogden, Uintah, East Layton, Fruit Heights, Farmington, Centerville, Bountiful, North Salt Lake, Salt Lake City (Salt Lake Temple, University of Utah, This Is the Place Monument), Sugar House, Sandy, Midvale, Murray, South Salt Lake, Salt Lake City (Utah State Capitol)	1996 Summer Olympics torch relay is located in Utah
May 11	Utah: Salt Lake City (Emigration Canyon), Henefer, Echo Wyoming: traveling by train, with stops in Evanston, Green River, Rawlins, Laramie, and Cheyenne (Wyoming State Capitol)	1996 Summer Olympics torch relay is located in Wyoming
May 12	Wyoming: traveling by train out of Cheyenne Colorado: traveling by train, stopping in Greeley (University of Northern Colorado) and Denver (Colorado State Capitol, City Park), then cycling to Colorado Springs (Garden of the Gods, U.S. Olympic Training Center/U.S. Olympic Committee headquarters)	1996 Summer Olympics torch relay is located in Colorado
May 13	Colorado: Colorado Springs, Limon, Brush, Sterling, Julesburg, carried on horseback by National Pony Express Association riders into Nebraska overnight	1996 Summer Olympics torch relay is located in Colorado
May 14	Nebraska: traveling on horseback 24 hours per day, with stops in North Platte and Kearney	1996 Summer Olympics torch relay is located in Nebraska
May 15	Nebraska and Kansas: traveling on horseback 24 hours per day, with celebrations in Marysville and Seneca	1996 Summer Olympics torch relay is located in Nebraska
May 16	Kansas: traveling on horseback into Missouri, with a celebration in Horton Missouri: St. Joseph (Pony Express ride ends at Patee House), Kansas City (Liberty Memorial, Union Station, Kemper Arena) Kansas: Kansas City, Fairway, Mission, Lawrence (University of Kansas), Topeka (Kansas State Capitol)	1996 Summer Olympics torch relay is located in Kansas
May 17	Kansas: Topeka (Washburn University), Eskridge, Emporia (Emporia State University, National Teachers Hall of Fame), Newton, Wichita (canoed down the Arkansas River to The Keeper of the Plains statue)	1996 Summer Olympics torch relay is located in Kansas
May 18	Kansas: Wichita, Arkansas City Oklahoma: Ponca City (Pioneer Woman), Pawnee, Yale, Stillwater (Oklahoma State University), Prague, Garden Grove, Stillwater	1996 Summer Olympics torch relay is located in Oklahoma
May 19	Oklahoma: Stillwater (National Wrestling Hall of Fame and Museum), Guthrie (Old State Capitol), Edmond, Oklahoma City (National Cowboy Hall of Fame and Western Heritage Center, National Softball Hall of Fame and Museum, Oklahoma State Capitol, Santa Fe Depot), traveling by train with stops in Norman and Fort Worth, Texas	1996 Summer Olympics torch relay is located in Oklahoma
May 20	Texas: Fort Worth (Stockyards), Arlington, Grand Prairie, Dallas (Dealey Plaza, City Hall, Union Station), De Soto, Hillsboro, Waco	1996 Summer Olympics torch relay is located in Texas
May 21	Texas: Waco (Baylor University), flown by airplane to Bryan, College Station (Texas A&M University), Navasota, Jersey Village, Houston	1996 Summer Olympics torch relay is located in Texas
May 22	Texas: Houston (Sam Houston Coliseum), Dayton, Liberty, Beaumont, Pinehurst, Orange Louisiana: Lake Charles	1996 Summer Olympics torch relay is located in Texas
May 23	Louisiana: Lake Charles, Jennings, Crowley, Lafayette (Cajundome, University of Southwestern Louisiana), Opelousas, Port Allen, Baton Rouge (Riverside Centroplex)	1996 Summer Olympics torch relay is located in Louisiana
May 24	Louisiana: Baton Rouge (Southern University, Louisiana State Capitol, Louisiana State University), Gonzales, Sorrento, LaPlace, Norco, Destrahan, Luling, Boutte, New Orleans (ride on St. Charles Streetcar, Lee Circle, Louisiana Superdome, Jackson Square)	1996 Summer Olympics torch relay is located in Louisiana
May 25	Louisiana: New Orleans, Slidell, Bogalusa Mississippi: Columbia, Prentiss, Brandon, Pearl, Flowood, Jackson, overnight travel by train, stopping in Vicksburg	1996 Summer Olympics torch relay is located in Mississippi
May 26	Arkansas: traveling by train, stopping in Pine Bluff and Little Rock (Little Rock Central High School, Arkansas State Capitol, MacArthur Park) Tennessee: Memphis (Beale Street, Riverfront Park)	1996 Summer Olympics torch relay is located in Arkansas
May 27	Tennessee: Memphis (Graceland, Lorraine Motel/National Civil Rights Museum) Arkansas: traveling by train, with stops in Osceola and Blytheville Missouri: traveling by train to Cape Girardeau, then running to Jackson, Perryville, Ste. Genevieve, Crystal City, Festus	1996 Summer Olympics torch relay is located in Missouri
May 28	Missouri: Festus, Crystal City, Herculaneum, Pevely, Barnhart, Arnold, St. Louis (Anheuser-Busch Brewery, Forest Park, Washington University, Francis Field, Gateway Arch)	1996 Summer Olympics torch relay is located in Missouri
May 29	Missouri, Illinois, Kentucky: driven by bus from St. Louis to Paducah, Kentucky, traveling by American Queen steamboat down Ohio River from Paducah to Cairo, Illinois, driven by bus from Cairo to Hannibal	1996 Summer Olympics torch relay is located in Missouri
May 30	Missouri: Hannibal, Palmyra, Canton Iowa: Keokuk, Mount Pleasant (Iowa Wesleyan College), Iowa City (University of Iowa), Coralville, Cedar Rapids	1996 Summer Olympics torch relay is located in Iowa
May 31	Iowa: Cedar Rapids (Coe College), Vinton, La Porte City, Waterloo, Cedar Falls, Charles City, St. Ansgar Minnesota: Austin	1996 Summer Olympics torch relay is located in Iowa
June 1	Minnesota: Austin, Rochester (Mayo Clinic), Zumbrota, Cannon Falls, Minneapolis (Minnehaha Park, Lake Calhoun [now Bde Maka Ska], Loring Park, Nicollet Mall, Boom Island Park)	1996 Summer Olympics torch relay is located in Minnesota
June 2	Minnesota: Minneapolis (University of Minnesota), St. Paul (University of St. Thomas, Macalester College, Minnesota State Capitol), then traveling by train, with stops in Red Wing and Winona Wisconsin: traveling by train, with stops in La Crosse (University of Wisconsin–La Crosse), Tomah, Wisconsin Dells, Watertown, and Milwaukee	1996 Summer Olympics torch relay is located in Wisconsin
June 3	Wisconsin: traveling by train, with stops in Milwaukee, Racine, and Kenosha Illinois: traveling by train, with stops in Waukegan, Lake Forest, Highland Park, Winnetka, Evanston, and Chicago (Chicago and North Western Terminal, Sears Tower, Greektown, Magnificent Mile, Grant Park, Washington Park, University of Chicago) Indiana: Hammond, Whiting, East Chicago, Gary (Indiana University Northwest)	1996 Summer Olympics torch relay is located in Illinois
June 4	Indiana: Gary, Merrillville, Crown Point, Demotte, Rensselaer, West Lafayette (Purdue University), Lafayette, Frankfort, Indianapolis (Riverside Park, Major Taylor Velodrome, Marian University), Speedway (Indianapolis Motor Speedway), Indianapolis (Soldiers' and Sailors' Monument)	1996 Summer Olympics torch relay is located in Indiana
June 5	Indiana: Indianapolis, Shelbyville, Columbus, Scottsburg, Henryville, Memphis, Speed, Sellersburg, New Albany, Clarksville, Jeffersonville Kentucky: Louisville (Louisville Slugger Museum & Factory)	1996 Summer Olympics torch relay is located in Indiana
June 6	Kentucky: Louisville (The Belvedere, University of Louisville, Churchill Downs), Bedford, Prestonville, Carrollton, Ghent, Warsaw, Florence, Erlanger, Edgewood, Crestview Hills, Lakeside Park, Fort Mitchell, Fort Wright, Covington Ohio: Cincinnati (Riverfront Stadium, Sawyer Point Park)	1996 Summer Olympics torch relay is located in Kentucky
June 7	Ohio: Cincinnati (Fountain Square), Norwood, Silverton, Sycamore Township, Fosters, Hamilton Township, Hopkinsville, Morrow, Wilmington (Wilmington College, Washington Court House, Grove City, Columbus (COSI, German Village, Ohio State Capitol)	1996 Summer Olympics torch relay is located in Ohio
June 8	Ohio: Columbus (Ohio State University), Worthington, Dublin, Jerome, Marysville, Kenton, Findlay (University of Findlay), Bowling Green (Bowling Green State University), Toledo Michigan: Dearborn	1996 Summer Olympics torch relay is located in Ohio
June 9	Michigan: Dearborn, Detroit (Philip A. Hart Plaza), carried by lake freighter across Lake Erie Ohio: Cleveland (Rock and Roll Hall of Fame, Hope Memorial Bridge, Jacobs Field)	1996 Summer Olympics torch relay is located in Ohio
June 10	Ohio: Cleveland (Gordon Park), Euclid, Willowick, Eastlake, Lakeline, Timberlake, Willoughby, Painesville, Geneva, Geneva-on-the-Lake, Ashtabula, North Kingsville, Conneaut Pennsylvania: Erie (Gannon University)	1996 Summer Olympics torch relay is located in Ohio
June 11	Pennsylvania: Erie, Harborcreek, North East New York: Fredonia, Highland-on-the-Lake, Wanakah, Blasdell, Lackawanna, Buffalo, Kenmore, Tonawanda, North Tonawanda, Wheatfield, Niagara Falls (Convention Center)	1996 Summer Olympics torch relay is located in New York
June 12	New York: Niagara Falls (Goat Island, Niagara University), Lewiston, Lockport, Chili Center, Rochester, Pittsford, Fairport, Seneca Falls, Camillus (riding along Erie Canal on a historic packet boat), Syracuse	1996 Summer Olympics torch relay is located in New York
June 13	New York: Syracuse (Syracuse University), Fayetteville, Oneida, New Hartford, Utica, Little Falls, Amsterdam, Schenectady, Albany (New York State Capitol)	1996 Summer Olympics torch relay is located in New York
June 14	New York: Albany, Menands, Watervliet, Troy, Brunswick Vermont: Bennington, Brattleboro New Hampshire: Keene, Nashua	1996 Summer Olympics torch relay is located in Massachusetts
June 15	New Hampshire: Nashua Massachusetts: Maynard, Marlborough, Hopkinton (Boston Marathon route), Ashland, Framingham, Natick, Wellesley, Newton, Boston (Kenmore Square, Faneuil Hall, Government Center, Massachusetts State House, Boston Common), Roxbury, Canton Rhode Island: Pawtucket, Providence (Rhode Island State House)	1996 Summer Olympics torch relay is located in Massachusetts
June 16	Rhode Island: Providence (Brown University) Connecticut: Storrs (University of Connecticut), Manchester, East Hartford, Hartford (Old State House, Bushnell Park, Connecticut State Capitol), West Hartford, Farmington, New Britain, Meriden, Hamden, New Haven (New Haven Green)	1996 Summer Olympics torch relay is located in Connecticut
June 17	Connecticut: New Haven, West Haven, Orange, Milford, Stratford, Bridgeport, Fairfield, Westport, Norwalk, Darien, Stamford, Greenwich New York: Port Chester, Rye, Mamaroneck, Larchmont, New Rochelle, New York City (The Bronx, Central Park, Rockefeller Center)	1996 Summer Olympics torch relay is located in Connecticut
June 18	New York: New York City (Rockefeller Center, Union Square, Wall Street, Whitehall Terminal, Circle Line ferry to Liberty Island and across the Hudson River) New Jersey: Jersey City (ferry landing at Exchange Place), Union City, Secaucus, Belleville, Montclair, Verona, West Orange, Livingston, Florham Park, Morristown, Princeton (gravesite of William Milligan Sloane in Princeton Cemetery, Princeton University), Lawrenceville, Trenton (New Jersey State Capitol) Pennsylvania: Morrisville, Philadelphia (Rocky Steps, Philadelphia Museum of Art)	1996 Summer Olympics torch relay is located in New Jersey
June 19	Pennsylvania: Philadelphia (Independence Hall), Upper Darby, West Chester Delaware: Wilmington (Rodney Square), Newark (University of Delaware) Maryland: Elkton, North East, Perryville, Havre de Grace, Aberdeen, Baltimore (Patterson Park, Johns Hopkins University, Federal Hill)	1996 Summer Olympics torch relay is located in New Jersey
June 20	Maryland: Baltimore (Camden Yards), Annapolis (United States Naval Academy, Maryland State Capitol), Largo Washington, D.C.: RFK Stadium, Lincoln Park, Supreme Court Building, United States Capitol, Gallaudet University, Howard University, Washington National Cathedral, American University, Mount Vernon College, Georgetown University Virginia: Arlington (Arlington National Cemetery), Marine Corps War Memorial Washington, D.C.: Lincoln Memorial, Vietnam Veterans Memorial, White House	1996 Summer Olympics torch relay is located in Maryland
June 21	Washington, D.C.: White House, Washington Monument, Jefferson Memorial Virginia: Alexandria, Mount Vernon, Woodbridge, Fredericksburg (Kenmore), Charlottesville (University of Virginia), Richmond (Virginia State Capitol, Tredegar Iron Works)	1996 Summer Olympics torch relay is located in Virginia
June 22	Virginia: Richmond, Petersburg, South Hill North Carolina: Henderson, Wake Forest (Southeastern Baptist Theological Seminary), Raleigh (Peace College)	1996 Summer Olympics torch relay is located in North Carolina
June 23	North Carolina: Raleigh (Reynolds Coliseum, North Carolina State University), Cary, Durham (North Carolina Central University, Duke University), Chapel Hill (University of North Carolina at Chapel Hill), Carrboro, Graham, Burlington, Elon (Elon College), Gibsonville, Greensboro	1996 Summer Olympics torch relay is located in North Carolina
June 24	North Carolina: Greensboro (Coliseum and War Memorial Auditorium, University of North Carolina at Greensboro), Winston-Salem (Wake Forest University, Winston-Salem State University, Bowman Gray Stadium), High Point, Lexington, Spencer (North Carolina Transportation Museum), Salisbury, Kannapolis, Concord, Charlotte (Charlotte Motor Speedway, University of North Carolina at Charlotte, Johnson C. Smith University)	1996 Summer Olympics torch relay is located in North Carolina
June 25	North Carolina: Charlotte South Carolina: Rock Hill, Ridgeway, Columbia (Benedict College, Allen University, University of South Carolina, South Carolina State Capitol), Union, Spartanburg, Greenville	1996 Summer Olympics torch relay is located in South Carolina
June 26	South Carolina: Greenville North Carolina: Flat Rock (Carl Sandburg Home National Historic Site), Hendersonville, Asheville, Cherokee, Great Smoky Mountains National Park Tennessee: Great Smoky Mountains, Gatlinburg, Pigeon Forge, Sevierville, Knoxville (World's Fair Park)	1996 Summer Olympics torch relay is located in Tennessee
June 27	Tennessee: Knoxville (James White's Fort, University of Tennessee), Kingston, Cookeville (Tennessee Tech), Carthage, Lebanon, Mount Juliet, Nashville (Ryman Auditorium, Tennessee State Capitol, Nashville Parthenon)	1996 Summer Olympics torch relay is located in Tennessee
June 28	Tennessee: Nashville (Vanderbilt University), Brentwood, Franklin, Shelbyville (Calsonic Arena), Fayetteville Alabama: Huntsville (Space Camp, U.S. Space & Rocket Center)	1996 Summer Olympics torch relay is located in Tennessee
June 29	Alabama: Huntsville, Madison, Decatur, Oakville (Jesse Owens Memorial Park), Cullman, Phelan, Hanceville, Gardendale, Fultondale, Birmingham (Legion Field, Birmingham–Southern College, University of Alabama at Birmingham)	1996 Summer Olympics torch relay is located in Alabama
June 30	Alabama: Birmingham (Vulcan Park), Homewood, Vestavia Hills, Hoover, Pelham, Alabaster, Jemison, Clanton, Selma (Edmund Pettus Bridge), Montgomery (Alabama State Capitol), Wetumpka (Olympia Temple of Hera replica at Jasmine Hill Gardens)	1996 Summer Olympics torch relay is located in Alabama
July 1	Alabama: Montgomery, Troy (Troy University), Brundidge, Ozark, Dothan Florida: Cottondale, Panama City, Panama City Beach	1996 Summer Olympics torch relay is located in Alabama
July 2	Florida: Panama City, Wewahitchka, Bristol, Quincy, Midway, Tallahassee (Florida State Capitol), Perry, High Springs, Gainesville	1996 Summer Olympics torch relay is located in Florida
July 3	Florida: Gainesville (University of Florida), Brooksville, Tampa, sailing across Tampa Bay to St. Petersburg	1996 Summer Olympics torch relay is located in Florida
July 4	Florida: St. Pete Beach, St. Petersburg (Sunshine Skyway Bridge), Palmetto, Bradenton, Sarasota (John and Mable Ringling Museum of Art), flown by seaplane to Miami (City Hall, Little Havana, Bayfront Park)	1996 Summer Olympics torch relay is located in Florida
July 5	Florida: Miami Beach, Surfside, Bal Harbour Village, Sunny Isles Beach, Golden Beach, Hallandale Beach, Fort Lauderdale (International Swimming Hall of Fame), Plantation, Pompano Beach, Deerfield Beach, Boca Raton, Delray Beach, Boynton Beach, Hypoluxo, Lantana, Lake Worth, West Palm Beach	1996 Summer Olympics torch relay is located in Florida
July 6	Florida: West Palm Beach, Riviera Beach, Lake Park, North Palm Beach, Juno Ridge, Juno Beach, Stuart, Port St. Lucie, White City, Fort Pierce, Vero Beach, Gifford, Sebastian, Roseland, Micco, Grant-Valkaria, Malabar, Palm Bay, Melbourne	1996 Summer Olympics torch relay is located in Florida
July 7	Florida: Indialantic, Indian Harbour Beach, Satellite Beach, South Patrick Shores, Patrick Air Force Base, Cocoa Beach, Merritt Island, Cape Canaveral (Kennedy Space Center), Orlando (Citrus Bowl, Lake Eola)	1996 Summer Olympics torch relay is located in Florida
July 8	Florida: Orlando, Winter Park, Daytona Beach, Ormond Beach, St. Augustine (Castillo de San Marcos)	1996 Summer Olympics torch relay is located in Florida
July 9	Florida: St. Augustine (Castillo de San Marcos), Jacksonville (Civic Auditorium), carried by Coast Guard Cutter Georgia: Fort Pulaski, sailing into Savannah (Forsyth Park)	1996 Summer Olympics torch relay is located in Florida
July 10	Georgia: Savannah (Forsyth Park, Armstrong State College), Hinesville, Darien, Brunswick, Jesup, Screven, Patterson, Blackshear, Waycross, Alma, Nicholls, Douglas	1996 Summer Olympics torch relay is located in Georgia
July 11	Georgia: Douglas, Ocilla, Tifton, Omega, Moultrie, Hahira, Valdosta (Valdosta State University), Quitman, Thomasville, Cairo, Bainbridge, Camilla, Putney, Albany (Albany State University, Thronateeska Heritage Center)	1996 Summer Olympics torch relay is located in Georgia
July 12	Georgia: Albany, Leesburg, Americus (Georgia Southwestern College), Plains (Jimmy Carter National Historic Site), Preston, Columbus (National Civil War Naval Museum, Golden Park, Columbus Civic Center), Pine Mountain (Callaway Gardens), Warm Springs (Little White House), Manchester, Thomaston, Fort Valley (Fort Valley State University), Perry (Georgia National Fairgrounds and Agricenter)	1996 Summer Olympics torch relay is located in Georgia
July 13	Georgia: Perry, Warner Robins, Macon (Macon Coliseum, Ocmulgee National Monument), Milledgeville (Georgia College, Georgia Military College), Irwinton, Dublin, Eastman, Soperton, Vidalia (Southeastern Technical College), Lyons, Reidsville, Hagan, Claxton, Statesboro (Georgia Southern University, Hanner Fieldhouse)	1996 Summer Olympics torch relay is located in Georgia
July 14	Georgia: Statesboro, Swainsboro, Midville, Louisville, Waynesboro, Augusta (Augusta National Golf Club), Harlem, Thomson, Warrenton, Sparta, Greensboro, Eatonton	1996 Summer Olympics torch relay is located in Georgia
July 15	Georgia: Eatonton, Madison, Watkinsville, Athens (Sanford Stadium, University of Georgia, Georgia Museum of Art), Jefferson, Gainesville (Brenau University, rowing on Lake Lanier), Dahlonega (North Georgia College), Cleveland (Truett McConnell College), Clarkesville, Toccoa, Clayton, Hiawassee (Georgia Mountain Fairgrounds), Young Harris	1996 Summer Olympics torch relay is located in Georgia
July 16	Georgia: Young Harris (Young Harris College), Blairsville, McCaysville Tennessee: Copperhill, Ocoee Whitewater Center Georgia: Eton, Chatsworth, Dalton, New Echota Historic Site, Calhoun, Rome (Berry College), Cartersville, Rockmart, Cedartown, Buchanan, Bremen, Carrollton (West Georgia College), Franklin	1996 Summer Olympics torch relay is located in Georgia
July 17	Georgia: Franklin, LaGrange, Hogansville, Grantville, Moreland, Newnan, Peachtree City, Senoia, Griffin, Fayetteville, Jonesboro (Clayton County International Park), Stockbridge, McDonough, Porterdale, Covington, Conyers (Georgia International Horse Park), Lithonia, Stone Mountain (Stone Mountain Park)	1996 Summer Olympics torch relay is located in Georgia
July 18	Georgia: Stone Mountain (Stone Mountain Park), Decatur, Druid Hills (Emory University), Chamblee, Doraville, Norcross, Peachtree Corners, Roswell, Sandy Springs, Atlanta (Georgia Governor's Mansion, Piedmont Park)	1996 Summer Olympics torch relay is located in Georgia
July 19	Georgia: Atlanta, Hapeville, College Park, East Point, Wolf Creek Shooting Complex, Atlanta (Fort McPherson, Morehouse College, Forbes Arena, Clark Atlanta University, Morris Brown College, Georgia Dome, Omni Coliseum, Centennial Olympic Park, Georgia Tech, Georgia State University, Woodruff Park, Georgia State Capitol, Atlanta City Hall, Atlanta–Fulton County Stadium, opening ceremony at Centennial Olympic Stadium)	1996 Summer Olympics torch relay is located in Georgia
