= Atlanta bid for the 1996 Summer Olympics =

Bids for the 1996 Summer Olympics and Paralympics
Overview
- Games of the XXVI Olympiad; X Paralympic Games
- Winner: Atlanta; Runner-up: Athens; Shortlist: Toronto · Melbourne · Manchester · Belgrade

Details
- Committee: IOC
- Election venue: Tokyo; 96th IOC Session

Map of the bidding cities

Important dates
- Decision: September 18, 1990

Decision
- Winner: Atlanta (51 votes)
- Runner-up: Athens (35 votes)

The city of Atlanta, in the U.S. state of Georgia, successfully bid to host the 1996 Summer Olympics, its first and only serious attempt at doing so. Initially seen as an underdog against the other candidate cities, particularly Athens, Atlanta was awarded the hosting rights on September 18, 1990, by the International Olympic Committee (IOC).

== Background ==
Atlanta expressed an interest in hosting the Olympic Games as early as 1919. That year, representatives of the city approached the IOC to discuss the 1920 Summer Olympics, a host for which had not yet been chosen due to the disruption of World War I. Baron Pierre de Coubertin, founder of the IOC, wrote that "Atlanta, Cleveland, and Philadelphia had all three promised the earth" in their proposals to the IOC, but none of these American cities made a formal bid and no further consideration was given. The 1920 Olympics were held in Antwerp, Belgium.

A 1974 study found that Atlanta was well-suited to hosting the Olympic Games, but the idea was shelved due to an economic recession. In November 1976, Olympic handball coach Dennis Berkholtz started a campaign for Atlanta to bid for the 1984 Summer Olympics. The campaign struggled to gain support from local political and business leaders, in part because of the negative experiences attached to recent Olympics: a massacre of protesters ahead of Mexico City 1968, the killings of athletes at Munich 1972, and the large debts incurred in the wake of Montreal 1976. A feasibility study by a local public policy group concluded that hosting the Olympics would be financially risky, and Coca-Cola CEO J. Paul Austin (who had competed in rowing at the 1936 Summer Olympics in Berlin) urged his fellow Atlanta elites to oppose the bid. Without support from Mayor Maynard Jackson or the Atlanta Chamber of Commerce, the bid was withdrawn in July 1977. The 1984 Olympics were ultimately awarded to Los Angeles, the only city that presented a bid to the IOC.

The financial and organizational success of the Los Angeles Olympics revived interest in hosting the Games in the United States and around the world. In the meantime, Atlanta's infrastructure and sports facilities improved dramatically. In 1986, Bob Shepherd, an official of the Fulton County Economic Development Department, proposed SPORTSCOM, a 10-year plan to establish Atlanta as an international center for sporting which would culminate in hosting the 1996 Summer Olympics. Nothing immediately came of the proposal, and later that year, when the U.S. Olympic Committee (USOC) invited 35 major cities to a seminar about potentially hosting the Olympics, the city of Atlanta did not respond.

== USOC candidate city ==
=== Billy Payne and the "Atlanta Nine" ===
Atlanta's bid campaign for the 1996 Olympics was created by William Porter "Billy" Payne, a local lawyer and former Georgia Bulldogs football player. Payne later said that his inspiration to bid for the Games came after he successfully led a fundraising effort to build a new sanctuary at his local church, St. Luke's Presbyterian Church in Dunwoody, Georgia, in February 1987. Wanting to replicate his feeling of accomplishment on a much larger scale, he decided that Atlanta should bid for the next available Olympic Games, without having ever attended such an event or knowing much about the process. Payne quickly gathered an informal group of friends and colleagues, who later collectively became known as the "Atlanta Nine", to investigate the possibility further.

Days after the group began these discussions, the Atlanta Constitution ran an article about the USOC's upcoming seminar for potential host cities, which focused on a bid from nearby Nashville, Tennessee, and mentioned that Atlanta had not responded to the invitation. After reading the article, Payne called the office of Mayor Andrew Young and was told that the city was not interested in bidding for the Olympics. After a conversation with the city's coordinator of festivals and special events, Holly Mull, Payne convinced her to attend the USOC meeting with him at his expense. Atlanta was one of 13 U.S. cities represented at the seminar, which took place at USOC headquarters in Colorado Springs, Colorado, on March 12, 1987.

Upon returning from the seminar, Payne was convinced that Atlanta was a suitable Olympic host. He founded the Georgia Amateur Athletic Foundation (GAAF) as a non-profit organization to pursue the Olympic bid. Mayor Young was persuaded to support the effort after Payne told him that the city government would not be responsible for any costs, and the two subsequently became close friends.

=== Bidding process ===
Atlanta was one of five cities to inform the USOC of its intent to bid by August 1, 1987, and (after Cleveland withdrew) one of four to submit a formal bid to the committee ahead of the September 15 deadline. The other candidate cities were Minneapolis–St. Paul, Nashville, and San Francisco. Atlanta's initial bid mostly made use of existing venues and the already planned Georgia Dome, but proposed the construction of a new stadium in downtown Atlanta and a new natatorium at the University of Georgia. Atlanta was the only city to deliver its bid book to USOC headquarters in person rather than by mail.

The GAAF gained an advantage over the other interested cities when the USOC agreed to hold its next executive board meeting at Atlanta's Omni Complex in January 1988, weeks before the USOC's site selection committee was set to tour the city. While the choice of 1996 host nominee was not one of the issues officially discussed at the Atlanta meeting, it allowed GAAF representatives to entertain USOC members in their home city, including a cocktail party at the home of organizer Sammy Kellett. Payne told reporters at the time that "we're not going to use [the meeting] as a lobbying effort" and promised that the event would be "low key", but later wrote in his autobiography that the meeting "convinced these folks that we were capable and serious" and "had begun the process of making friends" with USOC members. The visit also allowed USOC members to meet and reconcile with executives of the Turner Broadcasting System, the Atlanta-based media conglomerate which had created the Goodwill Games to compete with the Olympics.

The USOC site selection committee spent two days touring Atlanta in February 1988, traveling by helicopter to Athens, Georgia (where plans initially called for badminton, tennis, and aquatics events to be held) and Callaway Gardens (which would have hosted canoeing, kayaking, rowing, and equestrian events). At the end of the visit, the committee praised the strong support for the bid from Atlanta's political and business leaders, but criticized the city's lack of experience in hosting amateur sports competitions compared to other candidates. Later that month, representatives of Atlanta and the other candidate cities attended the 1988 Winter Olympics in Calgary, Alberta, Canada, to study the logistics of the Olympic Games up close.

Trying to quickly boost its credentials in hosting major sporting events, the GAAF volunteered to host an international friendly match between the U.S. and Japan in women's volleyball. The match fell on March 17, the same day as the start of the "March Madness" NCAA men's basketball tournament at Atlanta's Omni Coliseum, allowing Atlanta organizers to demonstrate their capacity to coordinate multiple events at the same time.

=== Finalist ===
The USOC announced at its Colorado Springs headquarters on March 28, one month before it planned to choose the U.S. nominee city, that it had narrowed the four candidates down to two finalists. San Francisco was rejected in part because of LGBT-related conditions the city's Board of Supervisors placed on its support for the bid, one of which was that the Gay Games would be allowed to call itself the "Gay Olympics", the name it had used before a lawsuit from the USOC forced it to change. Nashville was considered too small to host the Olympics.

This left Atlanta and Minneapolis–St. Paul for further consideration. Minneapolis was considered the front-runner over Atlanta; the director of the Minnesota Amateur Sports Commission had told reporters that the nomination was "ours to lose" while attending the Calgary Olympics, and some USOC members believed that Atlanta should have also been eliminated. Minneapolis had significantly greater experience with hosting amateur sports competitions, and was already preparing to host the 1990 U.S. Olympic Festival. Atlanta's bidders sought to compensate for this disadvantage with expressions of "Southern hospitality", fostering close personal connections with USOC members. The GAAF offered to fly voting members out to Atlanta for tours of the area, something that Minneapolis organizers admitted they "did not anticipate" doing.

The final decision on which American city would submit a bid to the IOC for 1996 was made at the next USOC House of Delegates meeting at the Washington Hilton in Washington, D.C., on April 29, 1988. Both candidates held receptions for USOC members the night before; the GAAF impressed delegates by renting out the Belgian embassy building for their party, while Minneapolis' event featuring synchronized swimmers at the Hilton pool was much less popular with delegates. When the USOC executive board voted, Atlanta was chosen over Minneapolis. The vote totals were not officially released, but a member unofficially told the Atlanta Journal and Constitution that the city had won by 65 votes to Minneapolis' 42.

== IOC candidate city ==
Atlanta began its international lobbying campaign even before it was made the USOC nominee. The city's mayor, Andrew Young, had previously been the United States Ambassador to the United Nations from 1977 to 1979, giving him extensive connections with diplomats from around the world. While visiting Washington for the USOC nominee vote, Young met with representatives of 10 countries to advocate for Atlanta's Olympic bid. However, he later admitted that IOC members were not as predictable as delegates to the U.N., describing the politics behind the vote as "more akin to electing a pope than anything".

Billy Payne founded the Atlanta Organizing Committee (AOC) to manage and raise funds for the city's bid effort. Payne was the president of the AOC, while Mayor Young (whose term ended during the bid process) served as its chairman. With the USOC's endorsement, the AOC easily garnered financial support from major Atlanta-based corporations, including Coca-Cola Enterprises and the Robert Woodruff Foundation. A total of $7.3 million was raised to support the bid. The total expenses of all six candidate cities during the bidding process was estimated at over $100 million.

=== Bidding process ===
Upon entering the international competition for the Games, Atlanta faced strong competition from cities around the world, most of which had been preparing for much longer. The front-runner candidate and a "sentimental favorite" for many delegates was Athens. Greek representatives believed that they had the right to hold the 1996 Olympics because it coincided with the 100th anniversary of the first modern Olympic Games in Athens, which had not hosted the event since. As early as 1976, Greek prime minister Konstantinos Karamanlis had said that Athens should host the 1996 Games and possibly every Olympics thereafter. When IOC president Juan Antonio Samaranch visited Athens in June 1988, he told the Greek press that "if you work hard, I can tell you that Athens will be the host country." However, there were concerns as to whether Greece had the infrastructure or the political stability to host a more modern Olympics. Other candidates included Belgrade, Manchester, Melbourne, and Toronto.

In the face of this competition, the AOC pursued the same strategy that it had used to win the USOC nomination vote, this time on a grander scale. Atlanta's appeals to the voting members of the IOC began in earnest in September 1988, at the 94th IOC Session in Seoul which coincided with the 1988 Summer Olympics. The AOC tracked the personal habits and preferences of all 88 voting members of the IOC in a detailed dossier, befriending many of them and spending the committee's funds on gifts for the members and their families. In one prominent example, Cuban delegate Manuel González Guerra, who had led the country's boycott of the 1984 Summer Olympics in Los Angeles, was given a locally-bred pet bulldog after expressing a fondness for the University of Georgia's mascot Uga. By the end of the bidding process, 78 of the 88 IOC members had visited Atlanta and met with city leadership personally.

Allegations of much more lavish gift-giving were published in the German newsmagazine Der Spiegel in November 1991, a year after the host city selection. Der Spiegel claimed that the AOC gave IOC members bribes of as much as $120,000 in cash, alongside presents that supposedly included free scholarships for the children of IOC members and an expensive heart surgery. Payne and IOC officials unequivocally denied the report, except for the surgery, the costs of which were covered by the hospital as a courtesy after an IOC member suffered a heart attack while visiting Atlanta.

These practices were brought into the public eye again when allegations that Salt Lake City had committed bribery to win the 2002 Winter Olympics were made in 1998. A Congressional investigation into the scandal concluded that "Atlanta's experience does not rise to the same level as Salt Lake City", but identified both as part of "a culture of corruption" that all Olympic bidders were expected to take part in. Billy Payne testified before Congress that "Atlanta's bidding effort included excessive actions, even thought processes, that today seem inappropriate, but at the time we believed it represented the prevailing practice in the selection process in an extremely competitive environment." The investigation did not find evidence to support the 1991 Der Spiegel article's claims, which more closely resembled the actions that Salt Lake City was found to have taken.

=== Advantages and disadvantages ===
The bid materials emphasized Atlanta's infrastructural and cultural strengths. The city already had state-of-the-art telecommunications facilities, including the global headquarters of CNN. Hartsfield–Jackson Atlanta International Airport was the second-busiest airport in the world in 1988, and featured the largest passenger terminal in the world, which the AOC predicted would "easily accommodate the 60 million people who will arrive and depart in 1996". At the time of the selection vote, Atlanta had recently hosted the 1988 Democratic National Convention and had just been awarded hosting rights for Super Bowl XXVIII, demonstrating its capacity for staging major televised events.

Symbolically, the AOC framed Atlanta as the center of a progressive, modern, and still culturally distinct South. A racially segregated city until the 1960s, Atlanta had played a key role in the Civil Rights Movement and was the home of Nobel Peace Prize laureate Martin Luther King Jr. Following the success of the movement and the racial integration of the city, the bid book told IOC members that Atlanta had become "the worldwide capital of human rights". Maynard Jackson became Atlanta's first Black mayor, while Andrew Young, a fellow activist and close associate of Dr. King, followed him as the second. Maynard Jackson was re-elected in November 1989 while Young pursued a campaign for governor of Georgia, losing in the Democratic primary in July 1990. Both enthusiastically supported the Olympic bid. The Atlanta Journal and Constitution mocked the bid committee's presentation of the city as a place "where white Southerners embrace Dr. King as a hero and blacks mingle comfortably among the plantation hoop skirts and mint juleps", writing that "this image is scrubbed of an awful lot of reality."

One factor working against Atlanta's bid was the memory of the 1984 Summer Olympics in Los Angeles. While those Games had been financially successful and had helped to revive worldwide interest in bidding for the Olympics, the host city selection vote occurred only six years after a Summer Olympics hosted in the United States, making IOC members hesitant to award another to the same country in a span of 12 years. Also, the IOC had received little of the substantial profit from television broadcasts of the Los Angeles Games. The AOC pledged that it would not do the same with its broadcasting revenues, which promised to be even greater because of Atlanta's ideal position in the Eastern Time Zone. 10 percent of proceeds were earmarked for the IOC, another 10 percent for the USOC, and 40 percent was to be distributed to the world's other National Olympic Committees. The AOC also repeatedly emphasized the physical and cultural distance between Atlanta and Los Angeles (which were further apart than the two most recent European Summer Games, Moscow 1980 and Barcelona 1992), with the suggestion that the U.S. should be thought of as more like a continent than a country.

At a meeting in Barcelona in June 1990, an evaluation commission privately presented its assessments of the six candidate cities. While such a report had been produced for past host city votes, this was the first which ranked the bids in order of quality. IOC president Samaranch disapproved of the idea of ranking cities and, supposedly, ordered all copies of the report destroyed. However, an Olympic official who had seen the report told the Atlanta Journal and Constitution in July that Atlanta was ranked first by a substantial margin, followed by Melbourne and Toronto, with the other three far behind.

=== Host city selection ===
The host of the 1996 Summer Olympics was chosen during the 96th IOC Session in Tokyo on September 18, 1990. On the first ballot, Athens led with 23 votes, while Atlanta came in second place with 19. As the voting went on and the other cities were eliminated, Atlanta gradually gained votes, tying with Athens on the third ballot and surpassing it on the fourth. On the fifth and final ballot, with all other cities eliminated, Atlanta prevailed over Athens by a vote of 51–35. Samaranch announced that Atlanta had won at 8:30 p.m. JST (7:30 a.m. EDT in Atlanta), prompting widespread celebrations centered at the recently opened Underground Atlanta complex and across the city.

The response to the decision in the other candidate cities, particularly in Athens, was bitter. Greek president Konstantinos Karamanlis, who had supported the Athens 1996 bid for over a decade, said that the IOC's choice "disregarded the history of the Olympic Games" for the sake of profit, while Prime Minister Konstantinos Mitsotakis declared that "it is not Greece that was defeated but the Olympic idea". Spyros Metaxas, chair of the Athens '96 Olympic Bid Committee, had said before the vote that the city would never bid again if it did not win the 1996 Games, then suggested the next bid would be no earlier than the Olympic bicentennial in 2096. Ultimately, Athens bid for and won the 2004 Summer Olympics.

Criticism of the selection of Atlanta focused heavily on Coca-Cola, with claims that the conglomerate (which has been a sponsor of the Olympics continuously going back to 1928) intervened to put the Games in its home city. In fact, the company had an arm's-length relationship with the Atlanta bid from the beginning; when Payne met with company president Donald Keough and suggested that Coca-Cola might benefit from having the Olympics in its "backyard", Keough replied, "Billy, the whole world is our backyard." (Payne himself recalled the incident slightly differently in his 2025 autobiography: in his telling, it was Coca-Cola CEO Roberto Goizueta who replied, "Billy, we have a very big backyard.") One of the company's subsidiaries had given $350,000 to the bid effort, but its other subsidiaries had donated smaller amounts to the committees in Toronto and Melbourne.

The rumors of Coca-Cola influence grew after the company distributed commemorative Atlanta pins at the Tokyo session; pins had also been made for the other candidate cities, but it appeared as if Coca-Cola had advance knowledge of the winner. A Coca-Cola marketing executive put one of these pins on Billy Payne's lapel without his realizing, leading him to unknowingly wear it during a press conference shortly after Atlanta won its bid, provoking further criticism of the company's ties to the bid. Payne described this in his autobiography as a "reckless and unappreciated move". The Athens newspaper Eleftheros Typos lamented that "the Olympic flame will now not be lit with oil, but with Coca-Cola", and a boycott of the company's products hurt sales in Greece over the next few years. Samaranch, who had personally supported Athens' bid, defended the IOC's decision and denied that Coca-Cola or any other companies had unduly influenced the vote. Relations between Athens and Atlanta were repaired during preparations for the 1996 Summer Olympics torch relay, which required close cooperation between the two cities to convey the Olympic flame to the United States.

With its work done, the Atlanta Organizing Committee was dissolved shortly after the IOC vote. Responsibility for actually organizing the 1996 Summer Olympics was given to the Atlanta Committee for the Olympic Games, founded and led by Payne and sharing most of the same leadership.

== Venues ==
Several changes were made to the venues designated for athletic events between the first long-form bid proposal submitted to the USOC in 1987 and the actual hosting of the Olympic Games in 1996. The main venue for the Games was originally going to be the Georgia Dome, which was planned before the Olympic bid effort began. Centennial Olympic Stadium evolved out of plans for a purpose-built venue for soccer and track-and-field events, later becoming the primary Olympic Stadium.

At one point, volleyball preliminaries were scheduled to be held at the newly-built Cobb Galleria Centre. However, this plan was changed after the County Commission of Cobb County approved a resolution in August 1993 which condemned "the gay lifestyle" and stated that it was incompatible with the "community standards" and "family values" of the county. In response to protests against this resolution, ACOG agreed to move the event to the University of Georgia's Stegeman Coliseum, where several other events were already scheduled. This controversy also affected plans for the Olympic torch relay, which ultimately avoided Cobb County entirely, thus excluding the northwestern suburbs of Atlanta, including Marietta and Mableton, from the event. Speaker of the House Newt Gingrich, Cobb County's congressional representative, said of the decision that "the homosexual demonstrators blackmailed the Olympic committee".

Sport	USOC bid, 1987	IOC bid, 1990	Venues used, 1996
Archery	Stone Mountain Park		
Athletics	Centennial Olympic Stadium		
Badminton	Stegeman Coliseum, Athens	Georgia World Congress Center	Georgia State University Gymnasium
Baseball	Atlanta–Fulton County Stadium		
Basketball (preliminaries)	—	Georgia Dome	Morehouse College Gymnasium
Basketball (finals)	Georgia Dome		
Boxing (preliminaries)	Omni Coliseum	Alexander Memorial Coliseum	Alexander Memorial Coliseum
Boxing (finals)	Omni Coliseum	Georgia Dome	Alexander Memorial Coliseum
Canoeing (slalom)	Callaway Gardens	Ocoee Whitewater Center	
Canoeing (sprint)	Callaway Gardens	Stone Mountain Park	Lake Lanier
Cycling (mountain bike)	—		Georgia International Horse Park
Cycling (road)	Stone Mountain Park		
Cycling (track)	East Point Velodrome	Stone Mountain Park	
Diving	University of Georgia Natatorium	Georgia Tech Aquatic Center	
Equestrian (dressage, eventing)	Callaway Gardens	Stone Mountain Park	Georgia International Horse Park
Equestrian (show jumping)	Atlanta–Fulton County Stadium	Centennial Olympic Stadium	Georgia International Horse Park
Fencing	Morris Brown College	Georgia World Congress Center	
Field hockey (primary)	Grant Field	Herndon Stadium	
Field hockey (secondary)	—	Clark Atlanta University Stadium	
Football (preliminaries)	—	Several sites suggested	Several sites used
Football (finals)	Centennial Olympic Stadium		Sanford Stadium
Gymnastics (artistic)	Georgia Dome		
Gymnastics (rhythmic)	Georgia Dome		Stegeman Coliseum, Athens
Handball	—	Georgia World Congress Center	
Judo	—	Georgia World Congress Center	
Modern pentathlon (fencing)	Stone Mountain Park	Georgia World Congress Center	
Modern pentathlon (equestrian, running)	Stone Mountain Park		Georgia International Horse Park
Modern pentathlon (shooting)	Stone Mountain Park		Georgia World Congress Center
Modern pentathlon (swimming)	DeKalb Dynamo Swim Club	Georgia Tech Aquatic Center	
Rowing	Callaway Gardens	Stone Mountain Park	Lake Lanier
Sailing	St. Simons, Jekyll, and Sea islands	Savannah, Georgia	
Shooting	DeKalb Firing Range	Stone Mountain Park	Wolf Creek Shooting Complex
Swimming; Synchronized swimming	University of Georgia Natatorium	Georgia Tech Aquatic Center	
Table tennis	Georgia State University	Georgia World Congress Center	
Tennis	University of Georgia	Blackburn Park, North Atlanta	Stone Mountain Tennis Center
Volleyball (preliminaries)	Stegeman Coliseum, Athens	Georgia State University Gymnasium	Stegeman Coliseum, Athens
Volleyball (finals)	Stegeman Coliseum, Athens	Omni Coliseum	
Water polo	Emory University	Purpose-built venue in Atlanta University Complex	Georgia Tech Aquatic Center
Weightlifting	Atlanta Civic Center	Atlanta Civic Center Auditorium	Georgia World Congress Center
Wrestling	Georgia World Congress Center		
Olympic Village	—	Georgia Tech	
Opening and closing ceremonies	Georgia Dome	Centennial Olympic Stadium	
International Broadcast Centre	Georgia World Congress Center		
Olympics cultural programme	—		Atlanta Civic Center

== See also ==
- United States bids for the Olympic Games
