= Heritage Plaza (Albany, Georgia) =

- Union Station depot
- U.S. National Register of Historic Places
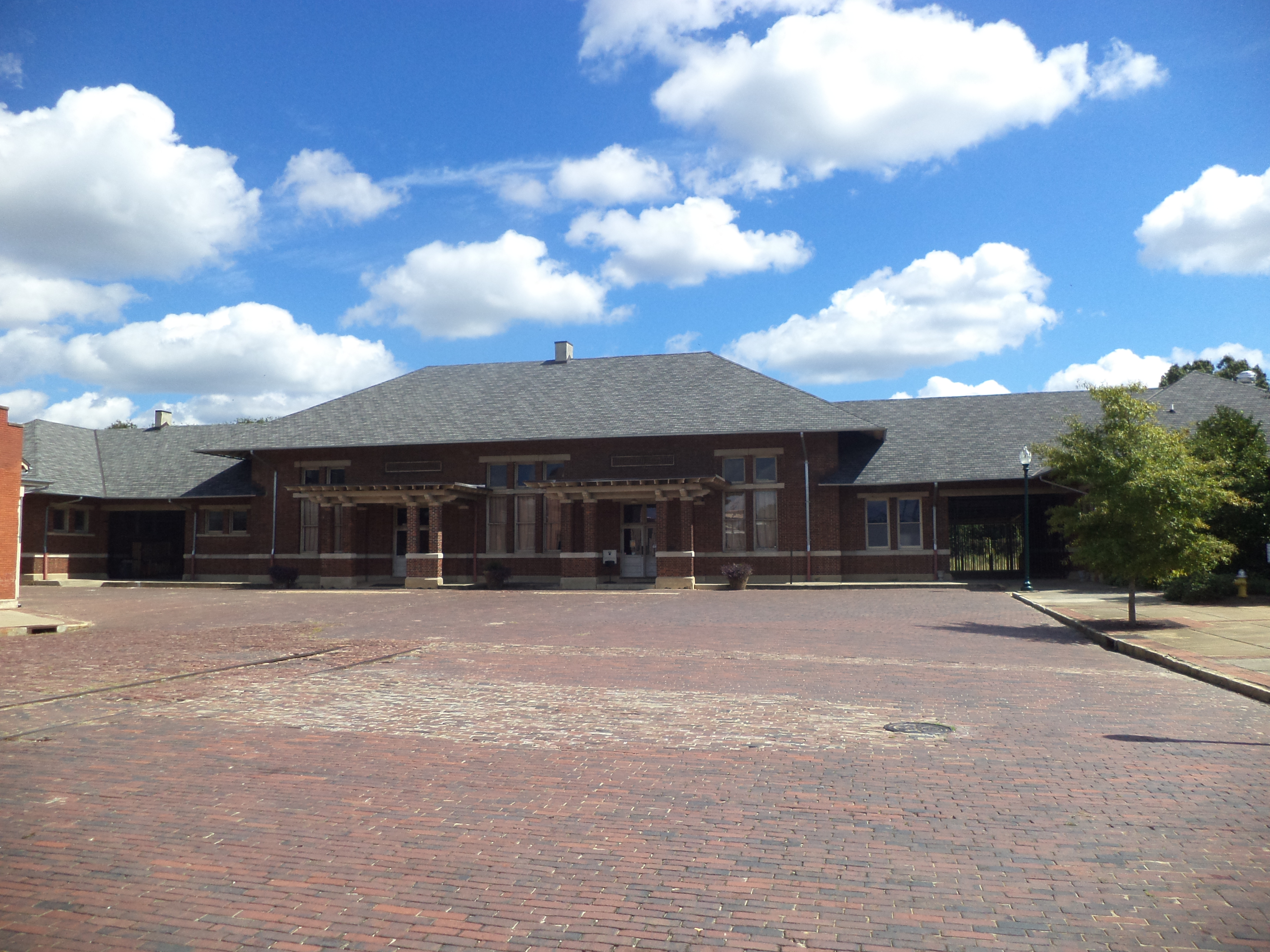

- Location within Georgia Location within the United States
- Location: Roosevelt Ave. and N. Front St.
- Nearest city: Albany, Georgia
- Built: 1913
- NRHP reference No.: 75000590
- Added to NRHP: 1975

- Albany Railroad Depot Historic District (Heritage Plaza)
- U.S. National Register of Historic Places
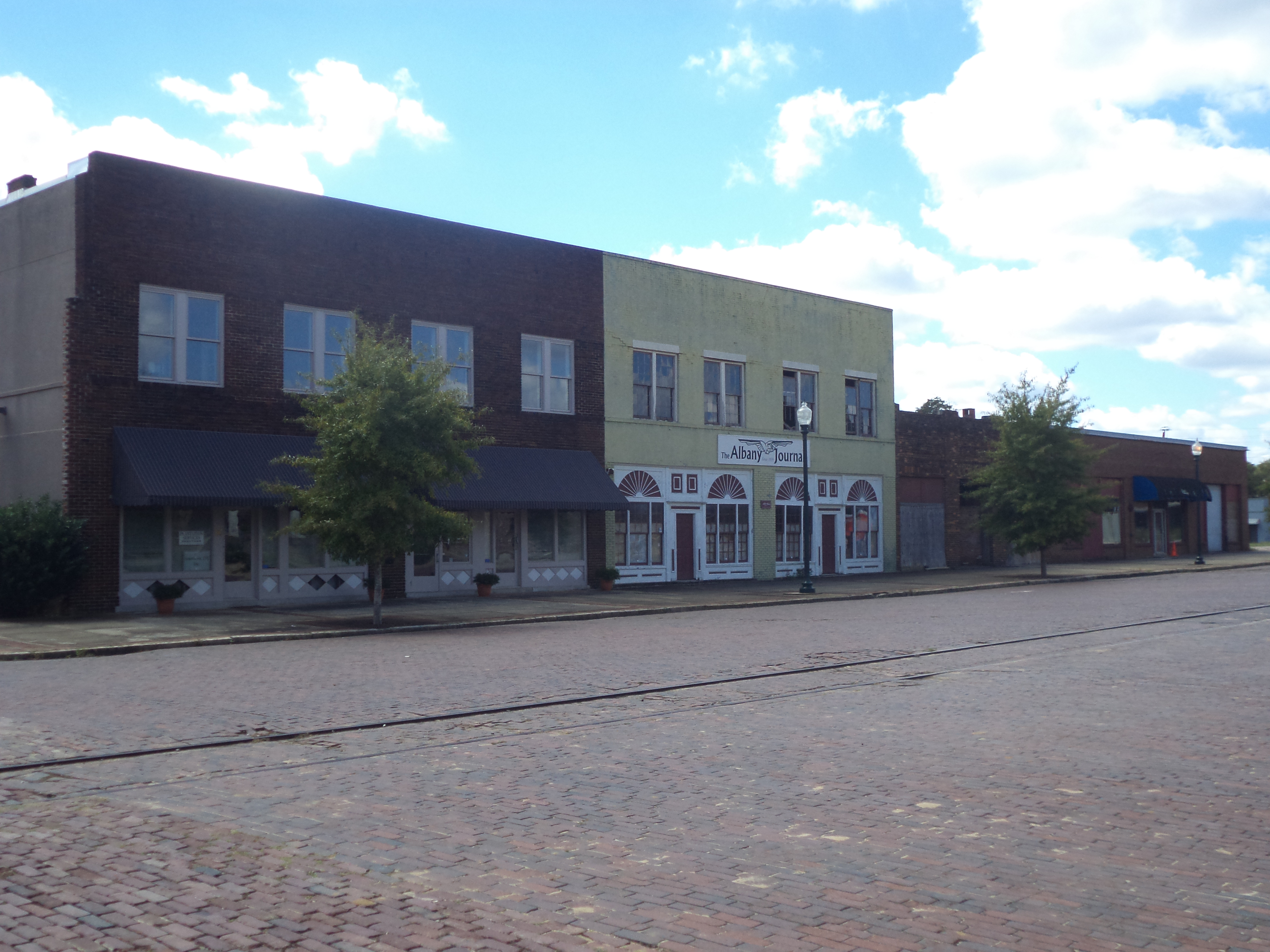

- Location within Georgia Location within the United States
- Location: 211-213 Roosevelt Ave.
- Nearest city: Albany, Georgia
- Coordinates: 31°34′55″N 84°9′0″W
- NRHP reference No.: 82002403
- Added to NRHP: 1982

Albany Railroad Depot Historic District (also known as Heritage Plaza) is located at the 100 block of West Roosevelt Avenue in Albany, Georgia, United States, and is governed by the Thronateeska Heritage Center, a 501(c)3 not-for-profit organization incorporated in 1974 for the purpose of historic preservation and science education in Southwest Georgia. Heritage Plaza includes the Tift Warehouse (constructed in 1857), the Union Station depot (constructed in 1913), the Railway Express Agency building and Albany's last remaining brick street and is listed in the National Register of Historic Places (NRHP).

== History ==
Union station was built in 1912 to serve passenger trains of the Albany and Northern, Atlantic Coast Line (ACL), Central of Georgia, Georgia Northern, and Seaboard Air Line railroads, replacing an earlier 1857 depot.

Major Louisville & Nashville and ACL trains making stops there included Seminole (Chicago-Florida), Flamingo (Cincinnati-Florida), City of Miami (Chicago-Florida), Dixie Flyer (Chicago and St. Louis to Florida), Dixie Limited (Chicago-Florida), and Southland (Cincinnati-Florida).

An unnamed service by the Central of Georgia operated through the station, from Atlanta, making a layover in Albany, and continuing to the Gulf Coast resort of Panama City, Florida.

The City of Miami was the last passenger train to operate out of Albany in 1971.

In 1974, concerned and community-spirited citizens championed the cause for revitalization of the historic downtown railroad depot area. Thronateeska Heritage Foundation, Inc. resulted from the merger of the Southwest Georgia Historical Society, organized in 1969, and the Albany Junior Museum, Inc., founded in 1959 by the Junior League of Albany.

Through Thronateeska's efforts, the 1913 Union Station depot, located in what is now known as Heritage Plaza, was preserved as a legendary landmark, converted into a museum, and listed on the National Register of Historic Places in 1975. The Wetherbee Planetarium was originally opened in the old Railway Express Agency (REA) building in 1980. A new Wetherbee Planetarium and Science Museum was constructed between the Railway Express Agency building and the Fryer-Merritt House in 2008. The new building incorporated architectural features of the original 1926 Central Georgia Roundhouse on the façade of the building.

In 1982, the Tift Warehouse (constructed in 1857 as the original passenger and freight depot), the REA building and Albany's last remaining brick street were added to the National Register with the Union Station depot and listed as Albany’s Railroad Depot Historic District.

Other historic structures have been relocated to the Plaza to preserve historic structures. The Fryer-Merritt House, built in the 1880s at 411 Pine Avenue, was relocated to Heritage Plaza in 1994 and renovated. The Hilsman Kitchen was originally moved from the home site of Dr. Hilsman (one of Albany's first doctors) to Heritage Plaza in 1977 and placed next to the REA building.

Preceding station	Atlantic Coast Line Railroad	Following station
Terminus	Albany – Brunswick	Acree toward Brunswick
Terminus	Albany – Dunnellon	Putney toward Dunnellon
Preceding station	Central of Georgia Railway	Following station
Walker toward Lockhart	Lockhart – Macon	Forrester toward Macon
