= National Pony Express Association =

- Abbreviation: NPEA
- Named after: Pony Express
- Predecessor: National Pony Express Centennial Association
- Formation: March 3, 1978; 48 years ago
- Type: Nonprofit
- Purpose: to preserve the original Pony Express trail and to continue the memory and importance of Pony Express in American history
- Headquarters: Pollock Pines
- Location: California, United States
- Affiliations: National Park Service; Pony Express Trail Association; Oregon-California Trails Association
- Website: nationalponyexpress.org

National Pony Express Association (NPEA) is a non-profit, volunteer-led historical organization. Its purpose is to preserve the original Pony Express trail and to continue the memory and importance of Pony Express in American history in partnership with the National Park Service, Pony Express Trail Association, and the Oregon-California Trails Association.

== History and organization ==
The first re-ride of the Pony Express was held in 1923. 60 participants rode across the eight states that had originally made up the Pony Express trail: California, Nevada, Utah, Wyoming, Colorado, Nebraska, Kansas, and Missouri.

In April through October 1935, a Pony Express re-ride was held to commemorate the Pony Express' Diamond Jubilee. This date coincided the 25th anniversary of the establishment of the Boy Scouts of America and 300 Boy Scouts were participants. Pieces of mail carried by the riders were delivered to President Franklin D. Roosevelt during a ceremony held on the White House lawn.

The National Pony Express Centennial Association was created in 1960 and worked with committees within each of the trail states to organize and conduct a 100th anniversary re-ride. This event attracted state and national attention with included the participation of President Dwight D. Eisenhower and the issuing of a commemorative coin by the United States Department of Treasury and the United States Postal Service.

In 1966, National Pony Express Association (NPEA) was organized and received official corporate on March 3, 1978. Its national headquarters is located in Pollock Pines, California.

== Annual re-ride ==
Since 1980, the National Pony Express Association had held a re-ride every year in June, except in 2020. NPEA members ride across the 1,966 mile route non-stop over 10 days. Beginning in St. Joseph, Missouri and ending in Sacramento, California (alternating beginning and end destinations yearly), riders carry commemorative mail in mochillas. Each rider covers one to ten miles and must be able to change horses and/or mochillas in less than 15 minutes.

== The Slide Ride of 1983 ==
Postal services were delayed following an avalanche that shut down U.S. Highway 50 between Whitehall and Kyburz, California on April 9, 1983. A contract was drawn up between the U.S. Postal Service and the National Pony Express Association in which riders agreed to carry the mail around the landslide for $2 a day. Riders from the California and Nevada NPEA divisions carried 60,000 pieces of mail (including tax returns) over six weeks.

== 1996 Olympic Torch Relay ==
On May 13–16, 1996, 325 National Pony Express Association riders from all eight state divisions carried the Olympic Torch during the torch relay for the 1996 Summer Olympics. Each rider covered 1 to 2 miles across a 544-mile route from Julesburg, Colorado, to St. Joseph, Missouri. The NPEA was the only group of Torchbearers who carried the Torch by horseback and it was also one of a few groups to carry the Torch 24-hours a day.

== 150th anniversary ==
Celebrations for the 150th anniversary of the Pony Express began April 1, 2010. This year's annual re-ride will begin in San Francisco, California on June 6 and end in St. Joseph, Missouri on June 26. This re-ride is longer this year and will only be conducted during daytime hours to give local communities and state Divisions the opportunity to hold celebrations and memorial dedications.

== See also ==
- Pony Express Bible
- Lexington Historical Museum
