= Paul Henderson (sailor) =

Canadian sailor

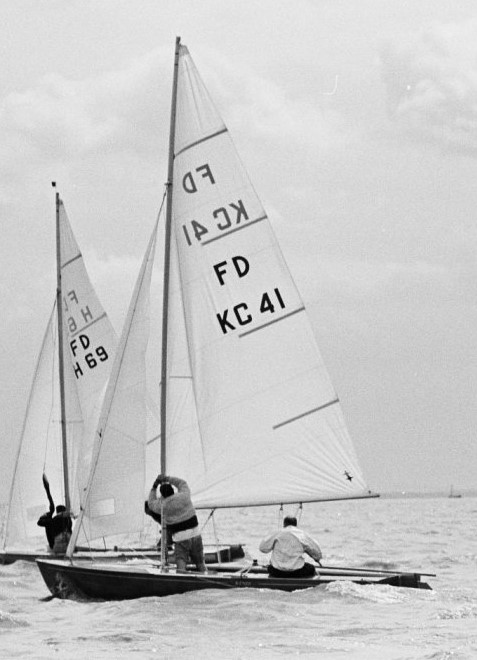
- Awarded the ISAF lifetime achievement
- Born: November 17, 1934 (age 91); Toronto, Ontario, Canada
- Other name: The Pope of Sailing
- Education: Engineering Degree from the University of Toronto
- Occupations: Retired Businessman of "RG Henderson and Son"
- Known for: ISAF former president 1994-2004
- Predecessor: Peter Talberg
- Successor: Göran Petersson
- Awards: ISAF Beppe Croce 2005, Canadian Olympic Hall of Fame - Builder Category 2001, Ontario Sports Award - 2001, Rolex Sailor of the Year - Canada 1994, Councilor of Honour - Canadian Yachting Association, Honorary Commodore, Royal Canadian Yacht Club, MAFSI Foodservice Hall of Honour - 2002, Honorary Member St James Town Sailing Club and the Mimico Cruising Club - Ambassador of the Vintage Yachting Games

Medal record

Sailing

Representing Canada

World Championships
Gold medal – first place	1959	International 14

Paul Franklin Henderson (born 17 November 1934) is a former president of the International Sailing Federation, renamed since as World Sailing, and is a member of the Canadian Olympic Hall of Fame.

== Sailing career ==
Living on Toronto Island around boats and sailing Henderson learned the basics of the sport, as well as the values and importance of sport early in life. He became a very active competitor in sailing, winning medals at World, North American and National Championships. He has the record of having competed in all the Canadian Olympic Sailing Trials from 1948 to 1984.

=== Olympics ===
Henderson has represented Canada at two Olympic Games and also coach at the 1972 Schilksee Olympics before attending others due to his roles within World Sailing and the IOC.

- 1964 Enochima in the Flying Dutchman
- 1968 Acapulco in the Finn .

=== Palmeres ===
Gold Medals

- 12 Canadian Championships including:
  - International 14 - 1959
  - Flying Dutchman - 1964, 1966, 1970
  - Finn - 1967
  - Star - 1979, 1980
  - Soling - 1975
- 5 United States titles including:
  - International 14 - 1957, 1959
  - 470 - 1970
  - Flying Dutchman - 1970
  - Finn - 1967
- 3 North Americans:
  - Flying Dutchman - 1963
  - Fireball - 1970
  - Finn - 1966
- Worlds:
  - International 14 - 1959

Silver Medal

- Flying Dutchman, Germany - 1962

Other Major Events

- Bermuda 1958 - Princess Elizabeth Trophy
- Holland 1962 - Prince Bernhard Trophy - Flying Dutchman

== Sport management ==
Henderson helped found the Water Rat Sailing Club in 1969 and the Outer Harbour Sailing Community, the Mooredale Sailing Club, the Outer Harbour Sailing and Catamaran Club, the St. Jamestown Sailing Club and the Hanlan Boat Club.

He was a member of the founding group that set up CORK (Canadian Olympic Regatta Kingston)

The first time Henderson represented Canada at the International Yacht Racing Union, was in 1970 to advise on the sailing venue for the 1976 Montreal Olympics. He stayed active for ISAF for over 30 years.

Henderson dedicated five years as a volunteer in his leadership of Toronto's bid to host the 1996 Summer Olympic Games and was also consulted for the bid for the 2008 Summer Olympics bid and to the 2010 Vancouver Winter Olympics bid.

Henderson was elected President of the ISAF in 1994; the first non-European to ever hold this position.

He was on the IOC Sports and Environmental Commission and Women and Sport Commission. During his presidency sailing went from 18% women athletes in Atlanta 1996 to 35% in Athens 2004.

=== Positions held ===
- ISAF Volunteer Positions
  - 1978 - 1994 - Vice President
  - 1994 - 2004 - President
- IOC Appointments
  - Member of IOC - 2000 -2004
  - Executive Member - Association of Summer Olympic International Sports Federations
  - Member IOC Sport and the Environment Commission
  - Member IOC World Anti-Doping Agency
  - Member IOC Women and Sport Committee
- Other Volunteer Positions
  - President Toronto 1996 Olympic Bid Committee
  - President Toronto Racquets Club 1972 to 1975
  - Board Member Crescent School 1980 -1983
- Other Honours
  - ISAF Beppe Croce 2005
  - Canadian Olympic Hall of Fame - Builder Category 2001
  - Ontario Sports Award - 2001
  - Rolex Sailor of the Year - Canada 1994
  - Councilor of Honour - Canadian Yachting Association
  - Honorary Commodore, Royal Canadian Yacht Club
  - MAFSI Foodservice Hall of Honour - 2002
  - Honorary Member St James Town Sailing Club, Mimico Cruising Club
  - Ambassador of the Vintage Yachting Games since 2011

== Professional life ==
Henderson ran RG Henderson and Son, a well-known restaurant equipment maintenance and repair company.

== Personal life ==
Henderson is married to Mary. They have two children, John and Martha; the latter represented Canada in the 2008 Olympics as crew member on the Canadian Yngling.

== Sources ==
- "Paul Henderson". Archived from the original on 18 April 2020.
- "Paul Henderson receives award". Archived from the original on 6 July 2011.
- Hugh Drake & Paul Henderson (2009). Canada's Olympic Sailing Legacy, Paris 1924 - Beijing 2008. Toronto: CYA.
- "Tokyo 1964". Olympics.com. International Olympic Committee.
- "Mexico City 1968". Olympics.com. International Olympic Committee.
