= Juno Ridge, Florida =

- CDP
- Interactive map of Juno Ridge, Florida
- Coordinates: 26°50′57″N 80°03′47″W
- Country: United States
- State: Florida
- County: Palm Beach

Area
  - Total: 0.23 sq mi (0.59 km^{2})
  - Land: 0.21 sq mi (0.55 km^{2})
  - Water: 0.015 sq mi (0.04 km^{2})
- Elevation: 16 ft (4.9 m)

Population (2020)
  - Total: 1,186
  - Density: 5,595.1/sq mi (2,160.27/km^{2})
- Time zone: UTC-5 (Eastern (EST))
  - Summer (DST): UTC-4 (EDT)
- ZIP codes: 33408, 33410
- Area codes: 561, 728
- FIPS code: 12-35862
- GNIS feature ID: 2402637

Juno Ridge is a census-designated place (CDP) in Palm Beach County, Florida, United States. It is part of the Miami metropolitan area of South Florida. The population was 1,186 at the 2020 US census.

== Geography ==
According to the United States Census Bureau, the CDP has a total area of 0.4 km^{2} (0.15 sq mi), all land.

== Demographics ==
Historical population
Census	Pop.	Note	%±
2000	742		—
2010	718		−3.2%
2020	1,186		65.2%
U.S. Decennial Census

=== 2020 census ===
As of the 2020 census, Juno Ridge had a population of 1,186. The median age was 41.2 years. 15.3% of residents were under the age of 18 and 17.2% were 65 years of age or older. For every 100 females, there were 117.6 males, and for every 100 females age 18 and over, there were 120.7 males age 18 and over.

According to the 2020 census, 100.0% of residents lived in urban areas, while 0.0% lived in rural areas.

There were 573 households in Juno Ridge, of which 18.0% had children under the age of 18 living in them. Of all households, 28.8% were married-couple households, 29.7% were households with a male householder and no spouse or partner present, and 31.4% were households with a female householder and no spouse or partner present. About 42.6% of all households were made up of individuals, and 14.4% had someone living alone who was 65 years of age or older.

There were 652 housing units, of which 12.1% were vacant. The homeowner vacancy rate was 5.0% and the rental vacancy rate was 5.0%.

Juno Ridge racial composition (Hispanics excluded from racial categories) (NH = Non-Hispanic)
Race	Number	Percentage
White (NH)	779	65.68%
Black or African American (NH)	28	2.36%
Native American or Alaska Native (NH)	5	0.42%
Asian (NH)	12	1.01%
Pacific Islander or Native Hawaiian (NH)	0	0.00%
Some Other Race (NH)	3	0.25%
Mixed/Multiracial (NH)	29	2.45%
Hispanic or Latino	330	27.82%
Total	1,186	

=== Demographic estimates ===
According to the 2020 ACS 5-year estimates, there were 334 families residing in the CDP.

=== 2010 census ===
Juno Ridge racial composition (Hispanics excluded from racial categories) (NH = Non-Hispanic)
Race	Number	Percentage
White (NH)	517	72.01%
Black or African American (NH)	30	4.18%
Native American or Alaska Native (NH)	2	0.28%
Asian (NH)	15	2.09%
Pacific Islander or Native Hawaiian (NH)	1	0.14%
Some Other Race (NH)	0	0.00%
Mixed/Multiracial (NH)	10	1.39%
Hispanic or Latino	143	19.92%
Total	718	

As of the 2010 United States census, there were 718 people, 497 households, and 136 families residing in the CDP.

=== 2000 census ===
As of the census of 2000, there were 742 people, 395 households, and 169 families living in the CDP. The population density was 1,909.9 people/km^{2} (4,947 people/mi^{2}). There were 429 housing units at an average density of 1,104.3 units/km^{2} (2,860 units/mi^{2}). The racial makeup of the CDP was 93.26% White (88.7% were Non-Hispanic White), 1.89% African American, 0.13% Native American, 0.81% Asian, 0.54% Pacific Islander, 1.75% from other races, and 1.62% from two or more races. Hispanic or Latino of any race were 5.66% of the population.

In 2000, there were 395 households, out of which 22.3% had children under the age of 18 living with them, 23.5% were married couples living together, 13.7% had a female householder with no husband present, and 57.0% were non-families. 43.8% of all households were made up of individuals, and 6.3% had someone living alone who was 65 years of age or older. The average household size was 1.88 and the average family size was 2.60.

In 2000, in the CDP, the population was spread out, with 18.1% under the age of 18, 10.0% from 18 to 24, 44.2% from 25 to 44, 20.2% from 45 to 64, and 7.5% who were 65 years of age or older. The median age was 35 years. For every 100 females, there were 116.3 males. For every 100 females age 18 and over, there were 120.3 males.

As of 2000, the median income for a household in the CDP was $37,727, and the median income for a family was $50,000. Males had a median income of $29,917 versus $27,065 for females. The per capita income for the CDP was $20,270. About 1.8% of families and 9.4% of the population were below the poverty line, including 6.4% of those under age 18 and 15.7% of those age 65 or over.

As of 2000, English was the first language for 92.50% of all residents, while Spanish was the mother tongue for 7.49% of the population.
