= Thronateeska Heritage Center =

Coordinates: 31.58185°N 84.14988°W

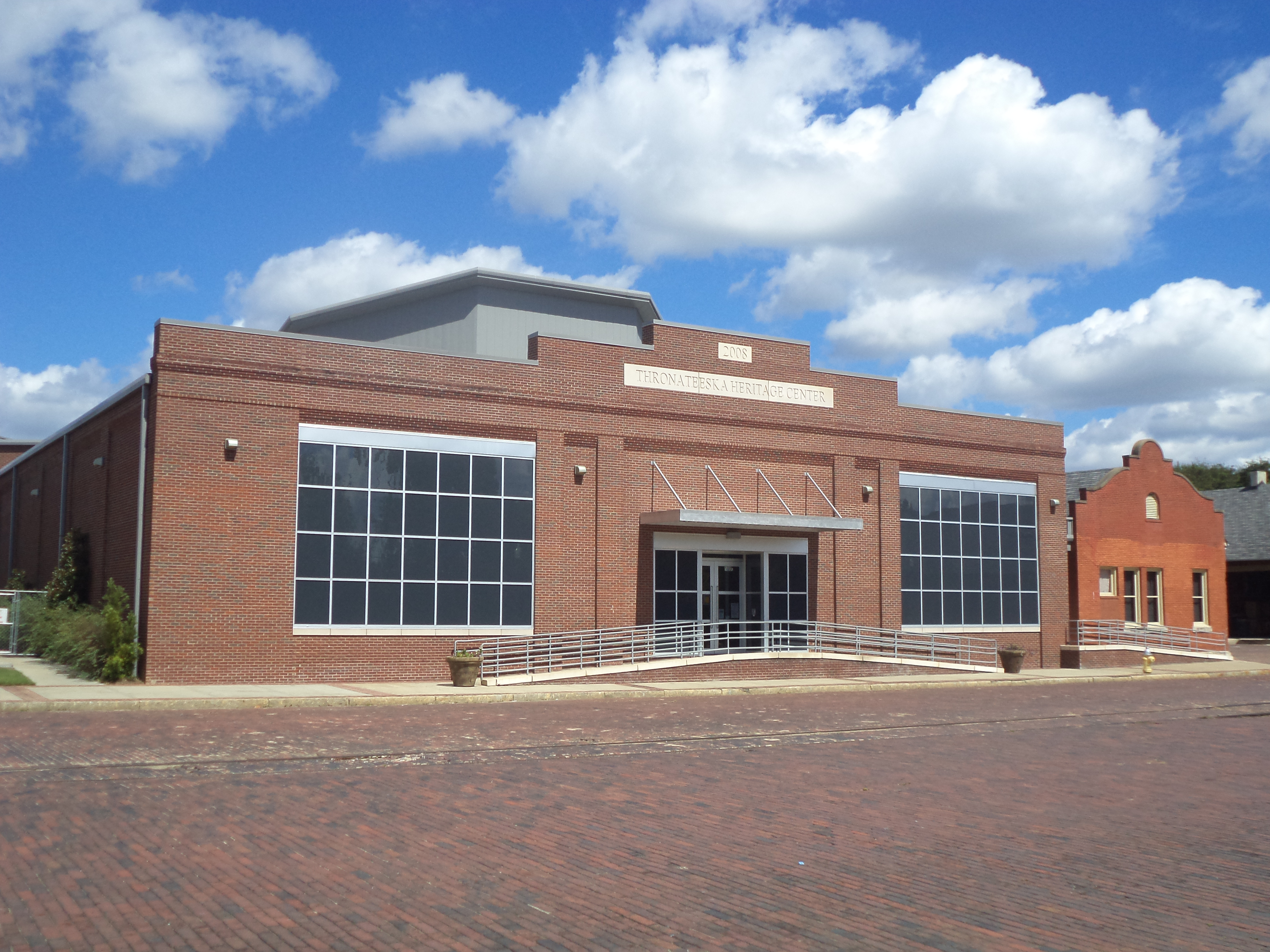
Thronateeska Heritage Center main building

Thronateeska Heritage Center is a 501(c)(3) not-for-profit organization incorporated in 1974 for the purpose of historic preservation and science education in Southwest Georgia. Thronateeska is located at Heritage Plaza, the 100 block of West Roosevelt Avenue in Albany, Georgia, United States.

Thronateeska's campus includes a history museum, science museum, rail car display, and a 40' full dome HD planetarium system, the first in the world of its kind. The museum facilities are housed in historic structures and new construction designed to reflect and retain the railroad heritage of the area. Thronateeska has an archives and collections department, which catalogues, stores, and cares for all of the collections at Thronateeska, and is open to the public for research purposes.

== History ==
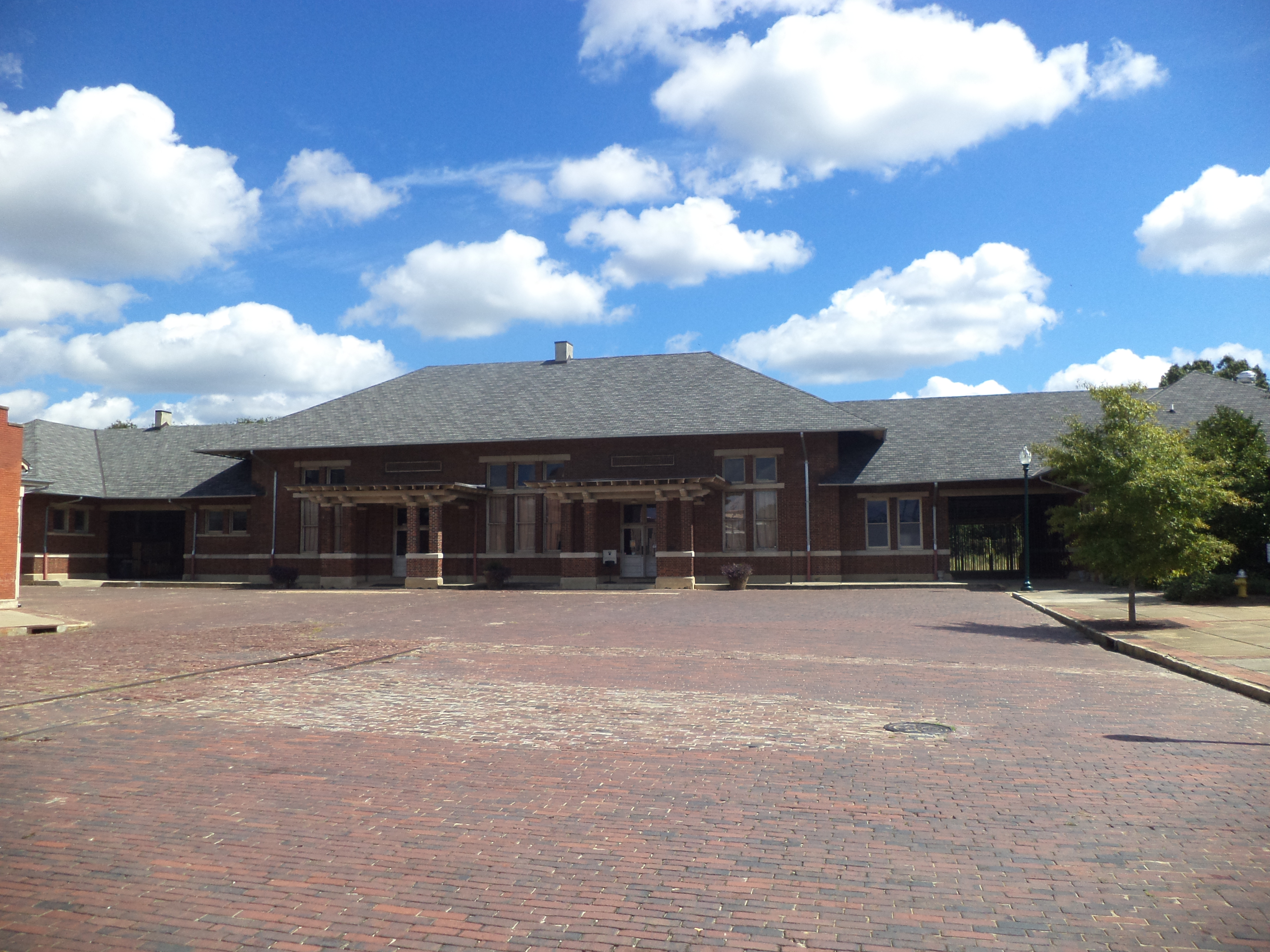
Union Station Depot, home of the History Museum

The word "Thronateeska" has been used and interpreted in Southwest Georgia as the Creek Native American name for the Flint River. The word relates to a Creek village called "Thronateeska" that existed over 300 years ago on the banks of the Flint River near Albany.

In 1974, concerned and community-spirited citizens championed the cause for revitalization of the historic downtown railroad depot area. Thronateeska Heritage Foundation, Inc. resulted from the merger of the Southwest Georgia Historical Society, organized in 1969, and the Albany Junior Museum, Inc., founded in 1959 by the Junior League of Albany.

=== Union Station and National Register listing ===
Through Thronateeska's efforts, the 1913 Union Station depot, located in what is now known as Heritage Plaza, was preserved as a legendary landmark, converted into a museum, and listed on the National Register of Historic Places in 1975.

=== Wetherbee Planetarium at the Railway Express Agency building ===
The Wetherbee Planetarium was originally opened in the old Railway Express Agency building in 1980. A new Wetherbee Planetarium and Science Museum was constructed between the Railway Express Agency building and the Fryer-Merritt House in 2008. The new building incorporated architectural features of the original 1926 Central Georgia Roundhouse on the façade of the building.

=== Tift Warehouse and Depot, Heritage Plaza National Register listing ===
In 1982, the Tift Warehouse (constructed in 1857 as the original passenger and freight depot), the REA building and Albany's last remaining brick street were added to the National Register of Historic Places with the Union Station depot and listed as Albany's Railroad Depot Historic District.

== Purpose ==
The purpose of what is now the Thronateeska Heritage Center, as outlined in Section 4, the Third Article of the "Agreement and Plan of Consolidation" dated May 2, 1974, between Albany Area Junior Museum, Inc, and Southwest Georgia Historical Society, Inc. is as follows:

- To promote the study of culture, traditions, customs and way of life of peoples of today and their predecessors, particularly in the area of South Georgia;
- To promote the preservation of historical and cultural artifacts and materials and to disseminate facts and information concerning the history, culture, arts, crafts, customs and way of life, particularly in South Georgia;
- To promote the conservation and preservation of artifacts, places and things illustrative of culture, customs, and way of life, particularly in South Georgia;
- To promote the study of and to disseminate information with respect to natural science and the environment, particularly in South Georgia;
- To establish and maintain a museum and natural science center primarily for the benefit of residents of South Georgia;
- To cooperate with and to assist schools, colleges, libraries and other organizations in South Georgia having similar objectives in advancing knowledge of and interest in South Georgia and in the natural history of South Georgia;
- To promote, sponsor or provide exhibitions, lectures, educational films, field trips, and other educational projects in furtherance of the Corporation's purposes;
- To acquire, hold, administer, preserve, and sell real and personal property having historical or cultural interest or significance primarily in South Georgia; and
- To encourage research, scholarship, and publications on subjects being promoted by the Corporation.
