= Bids for the 1996 Summer Olympics =

Bids for the 1996 Summer Olympics and Paralympics
Overview
- Games of the XXVI Olympiad; X Paralympic Games
- Winner: Atlanta; Runner-up: Athens; Shortlist: Toronto · Melbourne · Manchester · Belgrade

Details
- Committee: IOC
- Election venue: Tokyo; 96th IOC Session

Map of the bidding cities

Important dates
- Decision: September 18, 1990

Decision
- Winner: Atlanta (51 votes)
- Runner-up: Athens (35 votes)

Six cities submitted bids to host the 1996 Summer Olympics (formally known as Games of the XXVI Olympiad), which were awarded to Atlanta, on September 18, 1990. The other candidate cities were Athens (Greece), Toronto (Canada), Melbourne (Australia), Manchester (United Kingdom) and Belgrade (Yugoslavia).

== Results ==
1996 Host City Election — ballot results
City	Country (NOC)	Round 1	Round 2	Round 3	Round 4	Round 5
Atlanta	United States	19	20	26	34	51
Athens	Greece	23	23	26	30	35
Toronto	Canada	14	17	18	22	—
Melbourne	Australia	12	21	16	—	—
Manchester	Great Britain	11	5	—	—	—
Belgrade	SFR Yugoslavia	7	—	—	—	—

== Proposed dates ==
Atlanta	20 July - 4 August
Athens	17 August - 1 September
Toronto	17 August - 1 September
Melbourne	21 September - 6 October
Manchester	27 July - 11 August
Belgrade	24 August - 8 September

Note: (Note: Between the awarding of the bid and the Games themselves, the Games were extended from 16 to 17 days.)

== Bidding cities ==
=== Athens ===
Athens entered as the "sentimental favorite" for these games, because Greece, the home of the ancient and first modern Olympics, was considered by many observers the "natural choice" for the Centennial Games.

Athens bid chairman Spyros Metaxas demanded that it be named as the site of the Olympics because of its "historical right due to its history," which may have caused resentment among delegates.

The Athens bid was described as "arrogant and poorly prepared", being regarded as "not being up to the task of coping with the modern and risk-prone extravaganza" of the current Games. Athens faced numerous obstacles, including "political instability, potential security problems, air pollution, traffic congestion and the fact that it would have to spend about $3 billion to improve its infrastructure of airports, roads, rail lines and other amenities."

=== Atlanta ===
Atlanta was selected by the USOC over bids from Nashville, San Francisco and runner-up Minneapolis to be the U.S. representative in international bidding. The city entered the competition as a dark horse, being up against stiff competition against Athens.

The US media also criticized it as a second-tier city and complained of Georgia's Confederate history. However, the IOC Evaluation Commission ranked Atlanta's infrastructure and facilities the highest, while IOC members said that it could guarantee large television revenues similar to the success of the 1984 Summer Olympics in Los Angeles. Additionally, former US ambassador to the UN and Atlanta mayor Andrew Jackson Young touted Atlanta's civil rights history and reputation for racial harmony. Young also wanted to showcase a reformed and modernized American South.

The strong economy of Atlanta and improved race relations in the South helped to impress the IOC officials. The Atlanta Committee for the Olympic Games (ACOG) also proposed a substantial revenue-sharing with the IOC, USOC, and other NOCs.

=== Other bids ===
- The bid by Belgrade was submitted at the time of the breakup of Yugoslavia, and at a time when increasing tensions amongst former states of the Republic would result in the breakout of war only a year later. This risk was known to the IOC and undoubtedly lead to the Serbian capital ranking last in the final voting tally
- The Manchester bid for the 1996 Games was the second to be put forward by the United Kingdom in this period, after Birmingham lost to Barcelona to host the 1992 Summer Olympics. The plan offered by Manchester was seen as too expensive and considerable amount of urban renewal would be required to bring the city up to an Olympic standard. Manchester bid again unsuccessfully for the Olympics, losing to Sydney for the right to host the 2000 edition.
- The Melbourne bid marketed itself on the fact the city is home to the largest concentration of Greeks outside Greece itself, and if Athens was logistically unable to host the Centennial Olympics it would provide as sentimental substitute. In addition to this Melbourne has a substantial amount of existing infrastructure to handle such an event, and because of this alone was considered a front runner to host the 1996 Games, and its position at fourth after in the final tally came as a surprise many Olympic bid commentators. Melbourne was the host of the 1956 Olympics, and this may have played against its bid. Sydney later won the right to hold the 2000 Olympics
- While the bid put forward by Canada for Toronto to host the 1996 Summer Olympics was considered a viable and safe option, the fact Canada had just hosted the 1988 Winter Olympics in Calgary, was seemingly the bid's biggest downfall. In addition to this Montreal had hosted the Olympics in 1976, which was plagued with organizational problems, and resulted with the taxpayers of Quebec a substantial debt. Because of this the 1996 bid from Toronto was met with skepticism by the Canadian public. Jack Layton was one of the few members of Toronto City Council who opposed the Toronto bid for the 1996 Olympics Layton's opposition to the Olympics later came back to affect his 1990 mayoral campaign, as Toronto bid organizer Paul Henderson publicly accused Layton and his allies of costing Toronto the event.

== Aftermath ==
Allegations were quick to emerge in the Greek and Australian media that Atlanta had won the Games due to a conspiracy organized by global beverage company Coca-Cola, a longtime sponsor of the Olympic Games headquartered in Atlanta. Coca-Cola executives, however, had feared that a successful Atlanta bid would hurt their business. While they produced commemorative pins of the six candidate cities, with the intent of handing out the winning city's pins to IOC delegates, this backfired as others alleged that Coca-Cola had predicted which city had won; indeed sales of the beverage in Greece dropped for the next few years.

A year later, an article appeared in the German periodical Der Spiegel accusing the Atlanta Committee for the Olympic Games (ACOG) of bribing IOC members with up to $120,000 in cash, gold credit cards and college scholarships for their children. In one case, allegations that Atlanta had promised free heart surgery to IOC members coincided with reports that an IOC official had suffered a heart attack while visiting the city, with the medical expenses covered by ACOG as a "professional courtesy". In his defense, ACOG Chairman Billy Payne said, "Atlanta's bidding effort included excessive actions, even thought processes, that today seem inappropriate but, at the time, reflected the prevailing practices in the selection process and an extremely competitive environment." Indeed, these practices were widespread among cities wishing to host an Olympics, right up until the IOC scandal broke in 1998. The competing cities spent a total of over $100 million campaigning for the right to host the Summer Games, of which Atlanta spent $7.3 million.

Newsday slammed the IOC, saying that it did not provide the "poetic justice" in awarding Atlanta the games. Many felt that Athens should have had the right to host the games to mark the centennial anniversary of the modern Olympics.

== Reaction in Athens ==
Athens was angry at their defeat to Atlanta. People had gathered throughout the city hoping for a 21-gun salute to kick off the celebrations and upon hearing the announcement, reacted with shock, anger, and dismay. Greek officials, including President Constantine Caramanlis, called the selection of Atlanta one of "rage and disgust" and that the IOC "ignored the history of the Olympic Games" and committed "flagrant disregard of Olympic history." An Athenian daily newspaper declared the "Olympic flame will not be lit with oil, but with Coca-Cola," while the Athens bid chair, Spyros Metaxas, said that the city would never again bid for the Games.

However, Gianna Angelopoulos-Daskalaki chief of the successful bid for the 2004 Summer Olympics, later admitted that Athens bid was flawed, saying that Atlanta won the Games because "desire and heritage alone would not guarantee...election to host the Games. We realized...we should improve our city...our environment...our infrastructure."

Finally, Athens would host the 2004 Summer Olympics, after 108 years of Olympic history.
