= Garden Grove, Oklahoma =

Populated place in Pottawatomie County

Coordinates: 35°25′10″N 96°46′16″W

Garden Grove is a populated place in Pottawatomie County, Oklahoma, at an elevation of 958 feet. It is located southwest of Prague.

Jim Thorpe, Olympian in the Stockholm 1912 Olympic Games, was attending school in Garden Grove before being recruited to attend Carlisle Indian Industrial School in Pennsylvania.
