= December 1945 =

Month of 1945

<<	December 1945					>>
Su	Mo	Tu	We	Th	Fr	Sa
						1
2	3	4	5	6	7	8
9	10	11	12	13	14	15
16	17	18	19	20	21	22
23	24	25	26	27	28	29
30	31

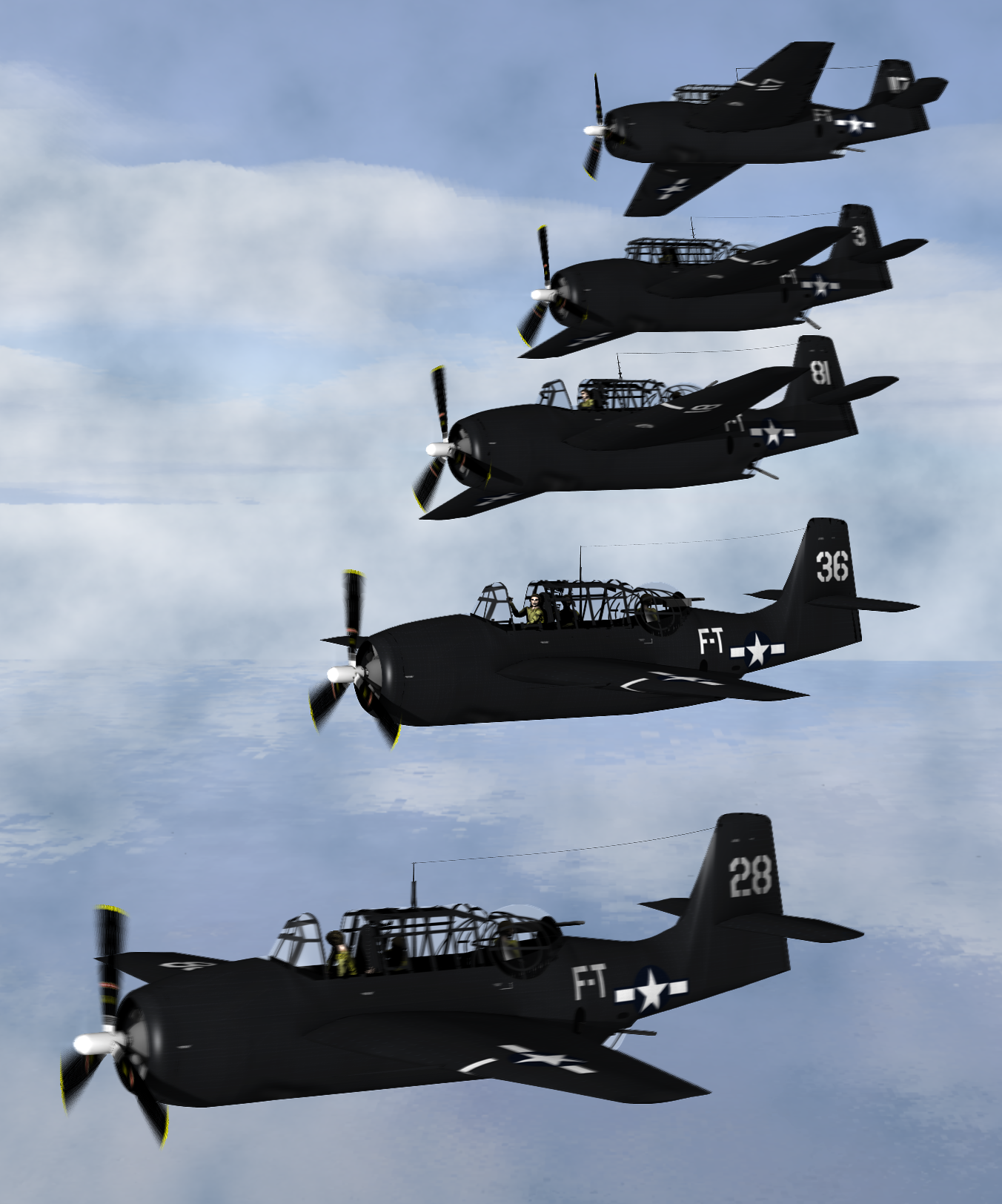
December 5, 1945: Flight 19 disappears over the Bermuda Triangle (photo-illustration)

The following events occurred in December 1945:

== December 1, 1945 (Saturday) ==
- British military police swept the Ruhr and Rhineland and arrested 76 Nazi industrialists.
- The Army–Navy Game was played in Philadelphia between two undefeated teams ranked the best two in the country. Army defeated Navy 32-13 before a crowd of over 100,000 that included President Truman. It was the first Army-Navy game to be televised, although only in the New York and Philadelphia areas.
- The Toronto Argonauts beat the Winnipeg Blue Bombers 35–0 to win the 33rd Grey Cup of Canadian football.
- Born: Bette Midler, singer and actress, in Honolulu, Hawaii
- Died: Anton Dostler, 54, German general (executed in Aversa, Italy by firing squad for war crimes)

== December 2, 1945 (Sunday) ==
- Parliamentary elections were held in Albania. The Communist-led Democratic Front won all 82 seats.
- General elections were held in Brazil in which Eurico Gaspar Dutra of the Social Democratic Party was elected president.
- Panificación Bimbo, as predecessor of Grupo Bimbo, a worldwide food processing brand, based in Mexico, was founded.
- Born: Tex Watson, murderer and member of the "Manson family", in Dallas, Texas

== December 3, 1945 (Monday) ==
- The Arab League voted in Cairo to boycott all goods from Jewish Palestine.
- The U.S. Supreme Court decided International Shoe Co. v. Washington, a landmark ruling that held that a party, particularly a corporation, may be subject to the jurisdiction of a state court if it has "minimum contacts" with that state.

== December 4, 1945 (Tuesday) ==
- The United States Senate approved the United Nations Participation Act by a vote of 65 to 7.
- Doc Blanchard of the United States Military Academy became the first junior to win the Heisman Trophy. He also became the only athlete to win both the Heisman and the James E. Sullivan Award prior to Charlie Ward in 1993.
- Born: Roberta Bondar, astronaut, in Sault Ste. Marie, Ontario, Canada
- Died: Thomas Hunt Morgan, 79, American evolutionary biologist, geneticist, embryologist and Nobel laureate

== December 5, 1945 (Wednesday) ==
- The French government nationalized five banks.
- Flight 19: Five Grumman TBF Avengers of the U.S. Navy disappeared during a training flight over the Bermuda Triangle.
- Died: Cosmo Gordon Lang, 81, Archbishop of Canterbury from 1928 to 1942

== December 6, 1945 (Thursday) ==
- U.S. General George C. Marshall testified at the Pearl Harbor inquiry that he did not anticipate the attack but that an "alert" defense would have prevented all but "limited harm."
- General MacArthur ordered the arrest of former Japanese Prime Minister Fumimaro Konoe and eight others as war criminals.
- The United Nations preparatory commission deadlocked 8–8 on the question of whether the selection of the location of a permanent home for the organization should be made via secret ballot or placed on public record.
- The drama film The Bells of St. Mary's starring Bing Crosby and Ingrid Bergman was released.

== December 7, 1945 (Friday) ==
- Japanese General Tomoyuki Yamashita was found guilty of war crimes in a Manila court and sentenced to death.
- The U.S. State Department announced plans to resettle 6.6 million Germans from Eastern Europe in the U.S. and Soviet occupation zones of Germany in the next eight months.
- Born: Clive Russell, actor, in Reeth, England

== December 8, 1945 (Saturday) ==
- Four people were killed in Buenos Aires when armed Perónists fired on an opposition rally.
- General MacArthur ordered that Masaharu Homma and four other Japanese commanders be put on trial for their role in the Bataan Death March.
- Bluegrass music was born when Bill Monroe invited Earl Scruggs and Lester Flatt to join him on stage at the Ryman Auditorium.

== December 9, 1945 (Sunday) ==
- According to Japan Coast Guard has official document figure report, a passenger ship Sekirei Maru, toward to Akashi from Iwaya port, Awaji Island, an overloaded 344 passengers and five crews, which capacities 100 persons, that sank by violensive wind in Akashi Kaikyo, Hyogo Prefecture, Japan. Total 304 persons were human fatalities, 45 persons were rescued.
- General George S. Patton broke his neck in a relatively minor auto accident near Mannheim, Germany that left him paralyzed from the neck down.
- The United States granted Britain a reconstruction loan of about $4.4 billion U.S.
- A bomb-damaged school in Mainz collapsed and killed 18 children.
- Born: Michael Nouri, actor, in Washington, D.C.

== December 10, 1945 (Monday) ==
- The Nobel Prizes were awarded in Stockholm. The recipients were Wolfgang Pauli of Austria for Physics, Artturi Ilmari Virtanen (Finland) for Chemistry, Sir Alexander Fleming (United Kingdom), Ernst Boris Chain (United Kingdom) and Howard Florey (Australia) for Physiology or Medicine, Gabriela Mistral (Chile) for Literature and Cordell Hull (United States) for Peace.
- Alcide De Gasperi became Prime Minister of Italy.
- The Netherlands ratified the United Nations Charter.
- Died: Theodor Dannecker, 32, German SS captain (suicide)

== December 11, 1945 (Tuesday) ==
- United Steelworkers voted unanimously to begin a nationwide steel strike on January 14. 700,000 workers planned to walk out to back up demands for a $2-a-day increase in wages.
- A B-29 Superfortress set a new coast-to-coast time record, flying from Burbank, California to Brooklyn, New York in 5 hours, 27 minutes and 6 seconds.

== December 12, 1945 (Wednesday) ==
- The Azerbaijan People's Government held its first National Assembly in Tabriz and proclaimed the Autonomous Republic of Azerbaijan with Ja'far Pishevari as its prime minister.
- Born: Portia Simpson-Miller, Prime Minister of Jamaica, in Wood Hall, Jamaica; Karl Edward Wagner, author and editor of horror, science fiction and fantasy, in Knoxville, Tennessee (d. 1994)

== December 13, 1945 (Thursday) ==
- The British House of Commons voted to approve both the British-U.S. loan agreement and the Bretton Woods agreement.
- RCA gave a "live" demonstration of color television from its Princeton labs.
- The romantic comedy film Caesar and Cleopatra starring Claude Rains and Vivien Leigh had its world premiere in London, England.
- Died: Johanna Bormann, 52, German SS concentration camp guard (hanged for crimes against humanity); Henri Dentz, 64, French general (died serving a life sentence in prison for collaborating with the Axis); Irma Grese, 22, German SS concentration camp guard (hanged for crimes against humanity); Fritz Klein, 57, German Nazi physician (hanged for crimes against humanity); Josef Kramer, 39, German Commandant of the Bergen-Belsen concentration camp (hanged for crimes against humanity); Elisabeth Volkenrath, 26, German concentration camp supervisor (hanged for crimes against humanity)

== December 14, 1945 (Friday) ==
- The U.S. House passed the Full Employment Bill of 1945 by a vote of 254 to 126.
- Died: Maurice Baring, 71, English playwright, poet, novelist, translator and essayist; Forrester Harvey, 61, Irish film actor

== December 15, 1945 (Saturday) ==
- The Battle of Ambarawa ended in Indonesian victory.
- Occupation authorities in Japan issued the Shinto Directive, abolishing state support for the Shinto religion.
- The U.N. preparatory commission voted to locate the permanent headquarters of the UN in the United States.

== December 16, 1945 (Sunday) ==
- Sinclair Oil Corporation ended a long wage dispute by agreeing to grant an 18% pay boost with a 40-hour week to the Oil Workers International union.
- The Cleveland Rams defeated the Washington Redskins 15–14 in the NFL Championship Game at Cleveland Stadium.
- Died: Fumimaro Konoe, 54, two-time prime minister of Japan (suicide by potassium cyanide)

== December 17, 1945 (Monday) ==
- Japan's legal code was amended to give women the right to vote.
- Honduras ratified the United Nations Charter.
- Charles Lindbergh spoke in public for the first time since 1941 when he addressed the Aero Club in Washington, D.C., advocating a world organization backed by military power and based on Christian principles.
- Born: Ernie Hudson, actor, in Benton Harbor, Michigan; Chris Matthews, political commentator, talk show host and author, in Philadelphia, Pennsylvania
- Died: Edward William Archibald, 73, Canadian surgeon

== December 18, 1945 (Tuesday) ==
- Ford Motor Company's offer of a wage increase of 15 cents per hour was rejected by the UAW.
- The House of Lords dismissed William Joyce's appeal of his conviction for treason. Joyce would be hanged on January 3, 1946.
- Uruguay ratified the United Nations Charter.
- Died: Gustav Simon, 45, German Nazi Gauleiter (died in captivity by the British, possibly committed suicide)

== December 19, 1945 (Wednesday) ==
- The Gaoyou–Shaobo Campaign and the Battle of Shaobo began as part of the Chinese Civil War.
- Swiss Parliament passed a law permitting the immediate expulsion of all foreigners with pro-Nazi or fascist views.
- The John Ford-directed war film They Were Expendable starring Robert Montgomery and John Wayne was released.
- Born: Elaine Joyce, actress, in Kansas City, Missouri
- Died: John Amery, 33, British fascist (hanged for treason); Leonard F. Wing, 52, American major general (heart attack)

== December 20, 1945 (Thursday) ==
- President Truman signed the United Nations Participation Act.
- Leopold Figl became the 14th Chancellor of Austria, while Karl Renner became the 4th President.
- Benito Mussolini's daughter Edda was sentenced to two years in prison for aiding Fascism.
- Born: Peter Criss, drummer, singer and co-founder of the rock band Kiss, in Brooklyn, New York; Sivakant Tiwari, senior legal officer of the Singapore Legal Service, in British India (d. 2010)

== December 21, 1945 (Friday) ==
- In the Chinese Civil War, the Battle of Shaobo ended in communist victory and the Battle of Tangtou–Guocun began.
- Ecuador and Iraq ratified the United Nations Charter.
- Ethiopian Airlines was founded.
- Died: George S. Patton, 60, American general (pulmonary edema and congestive heart failure)

== December 22, 1945 (Saturday) ==
- Britain and the United States recognized the Socialist Federal Republic of Yugoslavia.
- The Catholic People's Party was founded in the Netherlands.
- Born: Diane Sawyer, television journalist, in Glasgow, Kentucky
- Died: Otto Neurath, 63, Austrian philosopher of science, sociologist and political economist

== December 23, 1945 (Sunday) ==
- Pope Pius XII published Orientales omnes Ecclesias, an encyclical to the faithful of the Ukrainian Greek Catholic Church.
- Rajadamnern Stadium opened in Bangkok, Thailand.

== December 24, 1945 (Monday) ==
- George S. Patton was buried in a brief ceremony at the Luxembourg American Cemetery and Memorial in the Hamm district of Luxembourg City. His flag-draped coffin was borne from the railroad station to the burial site on a half-track.
- The Sodder children disappearance occurred in Fayetteville, West Virginia. A fire destroyed the home of George and Jennie Sodder and nine of their ten children. Four of the nine were rescued, but the bodies of the other five were never found. Some mysterious circumstances surrounding the fire and subsequent developments led the Sodders to believe for the rest of their lives that the five missing children survived.
- Pope Pius XII broadcast his annual Christmas message listing the "fundamental prerequisites for a true and lasting peace." The pope called for "collaboration, good will, [and] reciprocal confidence in all peoples. The motives of hate, vengeance, rivalry, antagonism, and unfair and dishonest competition must be kept out of political and economic debates and decisions."
- Born: Lemmy, founder and frontman of the rock band Motörhead, born Ian Kilmister in Burslem, Staffordshire, England (d. 2015); Nicholas Meyer, screenwriter, producer, author and director, in New York City

== December 25, 1945 (Tuesday) ==
- Japanese Admiral Shigematsu Sakaibara was sentenced to death by hanging for his role in the mass execution of the 98 American civilians remaining on Wake Island on October 7, 1943. Before the verdict was read Sakaibara declared in an outburst that the Americans who planned and carried out the atomic bomb attacks on Japan should be regarded "in the same light as we."
- Born: Gary Sandy, actor, in Dayton, Ohio

== December 26, 1945 (Wednesday) ==
- The Gaoyou–Shaobo Campaign ended in communist victory.
- George Bernard Shaw proposed a new phonetic alphabet with only one sign for each sound.
- Born: John Walsh, criminal investigator, anti-crime advocate and host of the television show America's Most Wanted, in Auburn, New York
- Died: Duy Tân, 45, Emperor of Vietnam from 1907 to 1916 (plane crash); Roger Keyes, 1st Baron Keyes, 73, British admiral

== December 27, 1945 (Thursday) ==
- The International Monetary Fund was established.
- Belgium ratified the United Nations Charter.

== December 28, 1945 (Friday) ==
- The War Brides Act was enacted in the United States to allow alien spouses, natural children, and adopted children of American troops to enter the U.S. as non-quota immigrants, "if admissible".
- A United Nations spokesman said that the committee would choose a site in the "general areas" of either Boston or New York City as a permanent home for the organization.
- Born: Birendra of Nepal, 11th King of Nepal, at Narayanhity Palace, Kathmandu (d. 2001)
- Died: Theodore Dreiser, 74, American novelist and journalist

== December 29, 1945 (Saturday) ==
- Koreans attacked American soldiers in Seoul to protest the administrative decision to wait as long as five years to restore Korean independence.
- U.S. Congress passed the International Organizations Immunities Act.

== December 30, 1945 (Sunday) ==
- 2,600 U.S.-trained Dutch troops landed at Batavia, Jakarta Indonesia to help reimpose colonial rule.
- Adolf Hitler's will and marriage certificate were announced as having been discovered in Tegernsee near Munich.
- The Battle of Tangtou–Guocun in China ended in communist victory.
- Born: Davy Jones, singer-songwriter, actor and member of The Monkees, in Openshaw, Manchester, England (d. 2012)

== December 31, 1945 (Monday) ==
- Chiang Kai-shek announced conditional acceptance of a Communist-proposed ceasefire in the Chinese Civil War.
- Tire rationing ended in the United States.
- Born: Barbara Carrera, actress and model, in San Carlos, Río San Juan, Nicaragua; Vernon Wells, actor, in Rushworth, Victoria, Australia; Connie Willis, science fiction and fantasy author, in Denver, Colorado
