= January 1946 =

Month in 1946

<<	January 1946					>>
Su	Mo	Tu	We	Th	Fr	Sa
		1	2	3	4	5
6	7	8	9	10	11	12
13	14	15	16	17	18	19
20	21	22	23	24	25	26
27	28	29	30	31

January 7, 1946: Austria divided into four zones

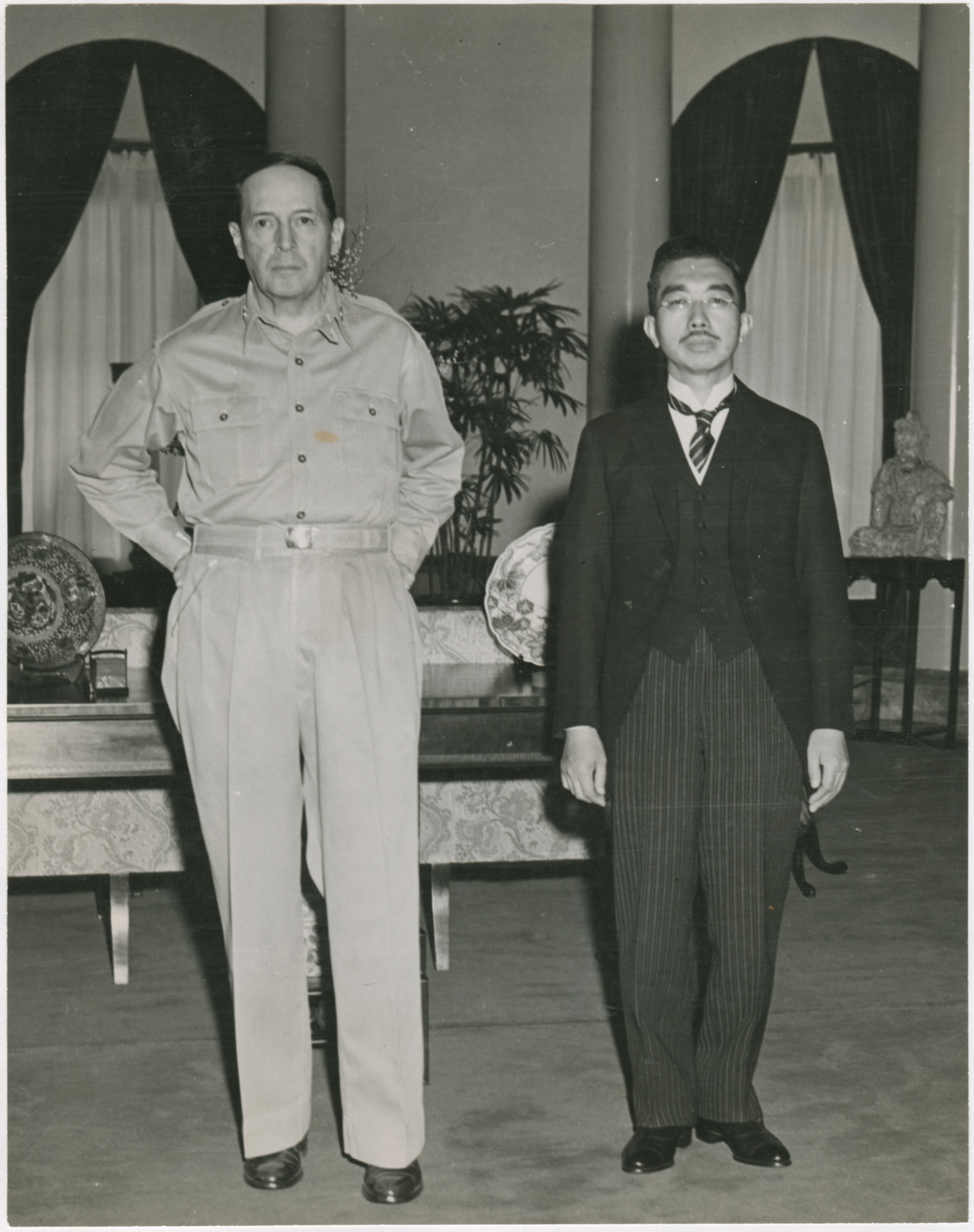
January 25, 1946: MacArthur spares Emperor Hirohito from war crimes trial

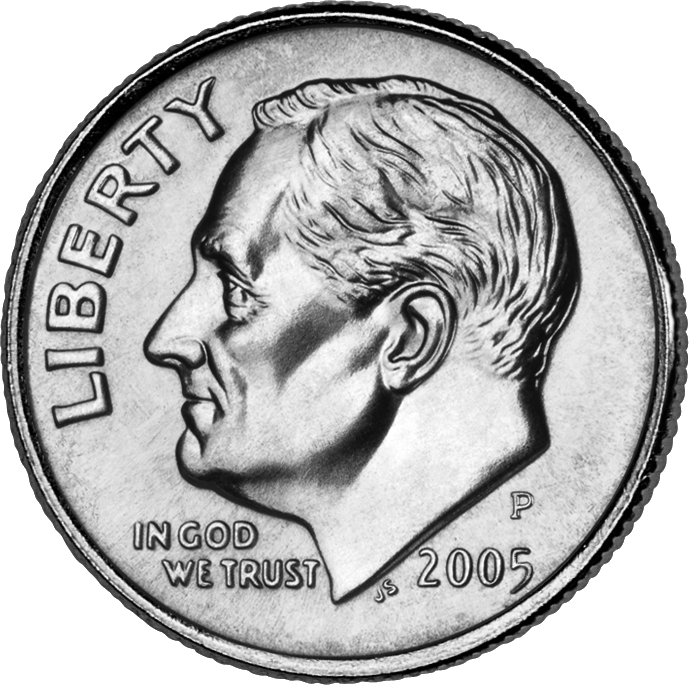
January 30, 1946: Roosevelt dime introduced on FDR's 64th birthday...

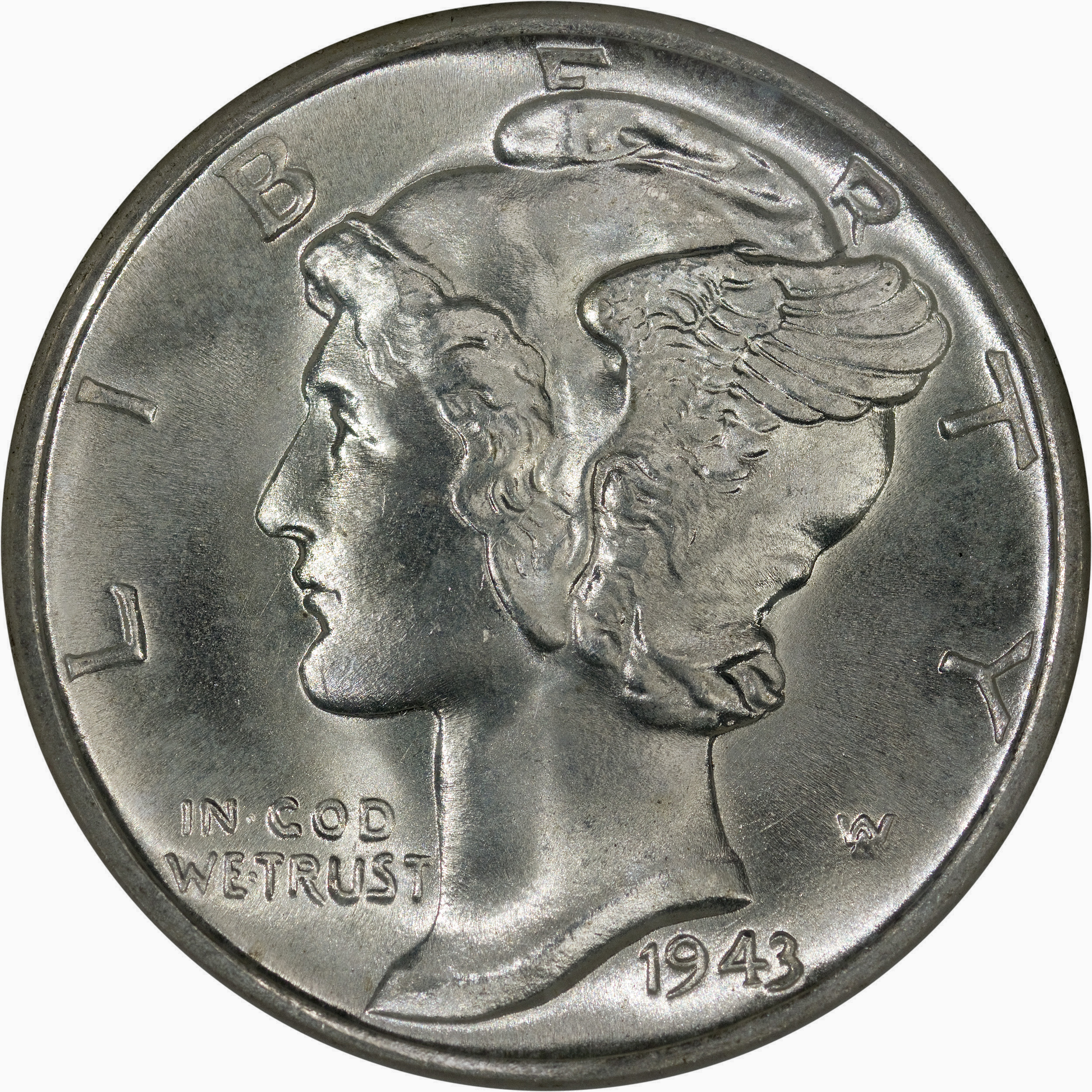
...replacing the Mercury dime

The following events occurred in January 1946:

== January 1, 1946 (Tuesday) ==
- Japan's Emperor Hirohito surprised his subjects with the "Humanity Declaration", a radio broadcast where he admitted that he was not descended from the Shinto Sun goddess Amaterasu Omikami, and that "The Emperor is not a living god". He added that his people had to "proceed unflinchingly toward the elimination of misguided practices of the past", including "the false conception that the Emperor is divine and that the Japanese people are superior to other races and fated to rule the world". The admission was published in newspapers throughout Japan.

== January 2, 1946 (Wednesday) ==
- In León, Mexico, federal troops, called in by the Governor of the State of Guanajuato, fired into a crowd of demonstrators, killing at least 40 people.
- The U.S. Army partially lifted a ban against marriage between American soldiers and enemy nationals, allowing servicemen to marry Austrian citizens. The ban against marriage of Germans was not lifted until December 11.

== January 3, 1946 (Thursday) ==
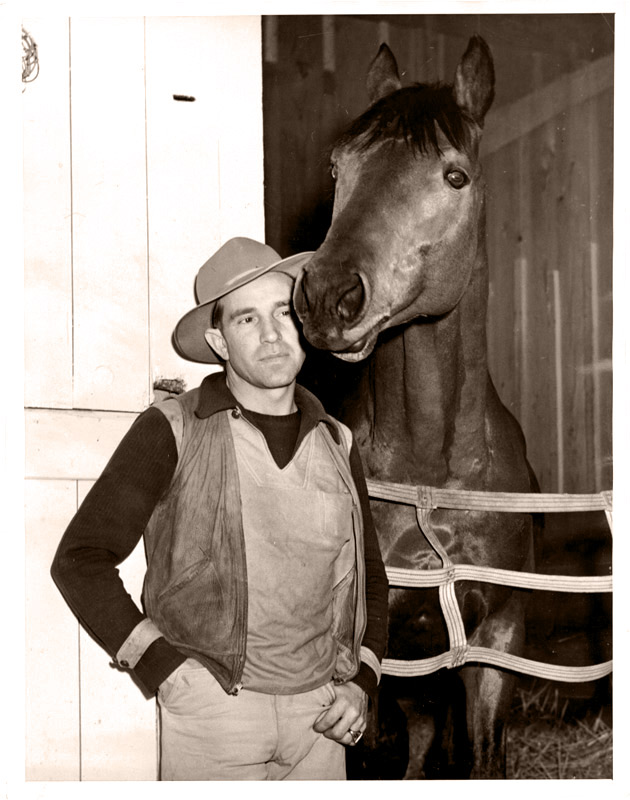
George Woolf

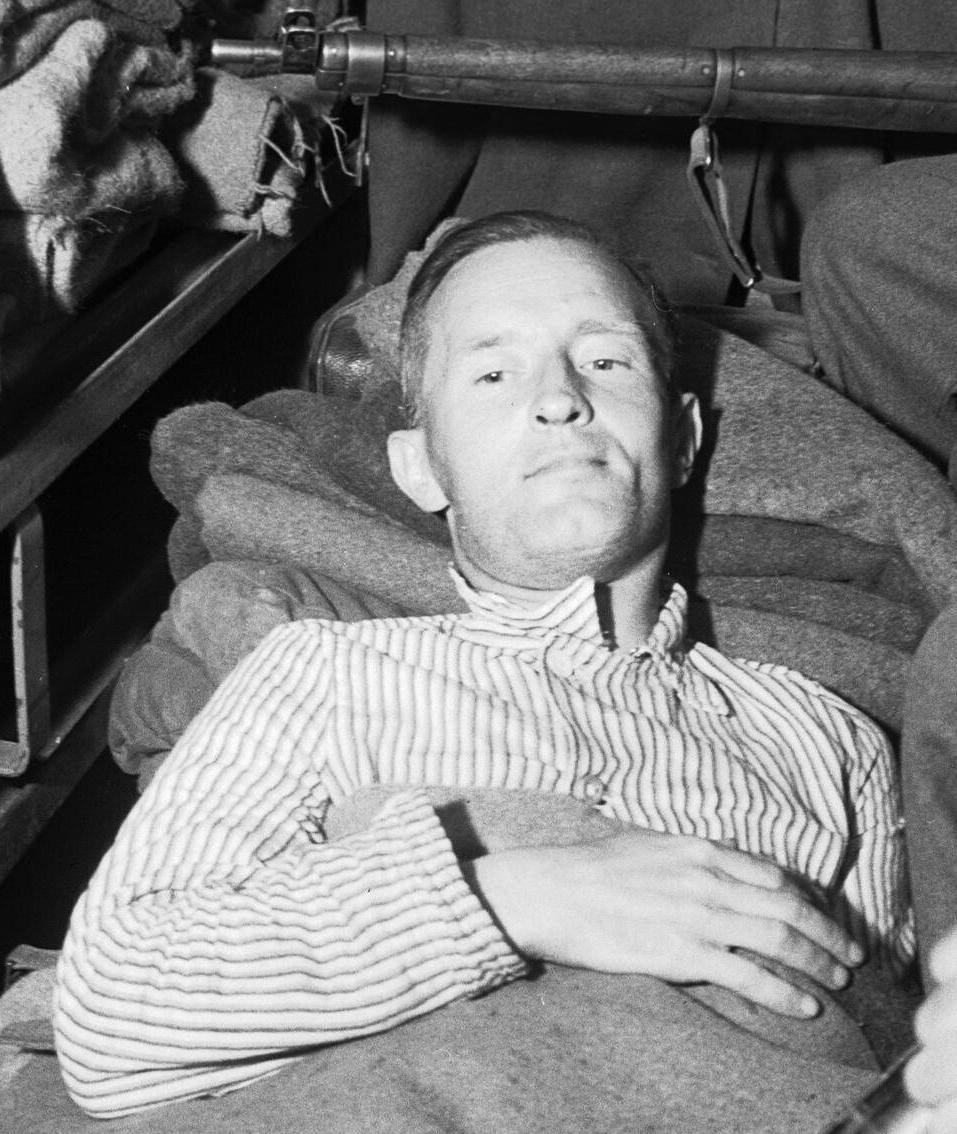
William Joyce, "Lord Haw Haw"

- George Woolf, a jockey who had ridden both Seabiscuit and Bold Venture to victory, was thrown from his horse during a race at Santa Anita Park. He died the next day at the age of 35. Woolf, nicknamed "The Ice Man", was in the first group of people admitted to the U.S. Jockey Hall of Fame when it opened in 1955.
- At a congressional hearing, Admiral Harold R. Stark testified that more than two months before the United States entered the Second World War, President Roosevelt had ordered American warships to destroy "German and Italian naval, land, and air forces encountered" if requested by British officers.
- Poland nationalized its main industries, with passage of a law "on taking public ownership of the basic branches of the national economy".
- Born:
  - John Paul Jones (real name John Baldwin), English rock bassist (Led Zeppelin); in Sidcup, Kent
  - Cissy King, American singer on The Lawrence Welk Show; in Trinidad, Colorado
- Died: William Joyce, 39, nicknamed "Lord Haw Haw" by his British listeners, a U.S.-born citizen of the United Kingdom who had defected to Germany to broadcast Nazi propaganda to Britain during World War II, was hanged at Britain's Wandsworth Prison at 9:00 a.m. for treason. A foreign correspondent noted that "Joyce's regular wartime broadcasts over the German radio made him one of the most hated and most ridiculed of men."

== January 4, 1946 (Friday) ==
- The United States Department of War announced a slowdown in demobilization of U.S. Army soldiers in the Pacific theater, cutting army discharges by 60 percent, from 800,000 down to 300,000 per month. In the week that followed, American soldiers around the world protested, in the Philippines, France, Guam, Germany, India and the United States. The War Department reversed the decision as a result of pressure from the "'Bring Em Home' Movement".
- General Douglas MacArthur, Supreme Commander of the Allied Powers (SCAP) during the occupation of Japan, began a purge of the Japanese government, with the goal of removing "undesirable personnel" from office. Over two and a half years, there were 210,287 people removed or barred from public office.
- The Reichskleinodien, treasures of the Holy Roman Empire which had been taken from Austria after the Anschluss, were returned to Vienna by General Mark Clark. Members of the U.S. Army had located the collection of 30 pieces, some more than 1,000 years old, including a Bible that had been found in the tomb of Charlemagne, and the "Holy Lance".
- A series of tornadoes swept through east Texas, killing 28 people and injuring 310 in Anderson, Angelina and Nacogdoches counties.

== January 5, 1946 (Saturday) ==
- Adolf Eichmann, the Nazi German architect of the Final Solution, escaped from the American detention camp in Oberdachstetten, where he had eluded detection under the alias of "SS Lt. Otto Eckmann". Eichmann then assumed the name of Otto Neninger and remained in hiding. In 1950, he made his way to Austria, then Italy, and as "Ricardo Klement", started a new life in Argentina. He avoided capture until May 2, 1960, when agents of Israel's Mossad kidnapped him, and was hanged in 1962.
- A revival of Kern and Hammerstein's 1927 musical Show Boat opened on Broadway at the Ziegfeld Theatre, and ran for 417 performances.
- Born: Diane Keaton (stage name for Diane Hall), American actress; in Los Angeles (d. 2025)

== January 6, 1946 (Sunday) ==
- The first democratic elections were held in Vietnam, and the Viet Minh Party, led by Ho Chi Minh, won 230 of the 300 seats in the National Assembly.
- Born: Syd Barrett (d. 2006), English rock musician (Pink Floyd); in Cambridge (d. 2006)
- Died: Slim Summerville, 53, American film comedian

== January 7, 1946 (Monday) ==
- The Allies restored Austria as a sovereign republic, with the borders it had before its 1938 annexation by Germany, but continued to administer the nation in four occupation zones. The largest cities in each zone were Innsbruck (French), Salzburg (American), Graz (British), and the area around Vienna (Soviet). Vienna itself was occupied by all four powers.
- Suzanne Degnan, 6, was murdered by serial killer William Heirens, "The Lipstick Killer" . Arrested later in 1946, Heirens was sentenced to life imprisonment and remained incarcerated until his death in 2012.
- France resumed its protectorate relationship over Cambodia, following an agreement signed by King Norodom Sihanouk. Under the pact, France would manage all of Cambodia's foreign affairs and grant autonomy to the Cambodian people.
- Born:
  - Michele Elliott, U.S.-born British author, psychologist and founder of child protection charity Kidscape;; in St. Petersburg, Florida
  - Jann Wenner, co-founder and publisher of Rolling Stone magazine, in New York City

== January 8, 1946 (Tuesday) ==
- Germany's Hereditary Health Court (Erbgesundheitsgericht) system was formally abolished by the Allied powers. From 1934 through 1945, the courts ordered surgery for the sterilization of 400,000 persons with hereditary defects such as mental retardation, schizophrenia, and epilepsy. The system provided for an appellate court (Erbgesundheitobergericht), but the orders were upheld 97% of the time.
- The last Japanese prisoners of war in the United States departed, on board a ship from Angel Island (California), for repatriation.
- Born:
  - Robby Krieger, American rock musician and songwriter (The Doors); in Los Angeles
  - Stanton Peele, American psychologist and author (The Diseasing of America)
- Died: Dion Fortune, 51, Welsh occultist and author

== January 9, 1946 (Wednesday) ==
- László Bárdossy, who had served as Prime Minister of Hungary in 1941 and 1942, and later collaborated with the Nazis during the German occupation of Hungary, was executed by hanging in Budapest.
- Harold Cole, a British sergeant called by some "the worst traitor of World War II", was killed in a shootout with police in Paris. Sergeant Cole had landed in France as part of the British Expeditionary Force, then deserted in 1941, betraying more than 150 people to the German Gestapo, fifty of whom were executed.
- Died: Countee Cullen, 42, American poet

== January 10, 1946 (Thursday) ==
- The first meeting of the United Nations General Assembly convened, with delegates from 51 nations meeting in London. British Prime Minister Clement Attlee opened the session. In secret voting for the first President of the UNGA, Paul-Henri Spaak of Belgium won the post, 28–23, over Trygve Lie of Norway. Lie would be selected for a more powerful post as first Secretary-General of the United Nations.
- Conducted from a laboratory in Belmar, New Jersey, by the Evans Signal Laboratory, Project Diana bounced radar waves off the Moon for the first time, measuring its exact distance from the Earth (a mean of 238,857 miles or 384,403 kilometers), and proving that communication is possible between Earth and outer space.
- Died:
  - Matti Turkia, 74, Finnish politician and leader of the Social Democratic Party of Finland, 1906-1918
  - Harry Von Tilzer, 73, American songwriter known for writing the melody for "A Bird in a Gilded Cage"

== January 11, 1946 (Friday) ==
Albania

- The People's Republic of Albania was proclaimed at noon (1100 GMT), with Communist leader Enver Hoxha as the nation's prime minister. Two months later, a new constitution proclaimed Hoxha's Communist Party of Albania to be the sole political party, and Marxism–Leninism as the ideology, of the People's Socialist Republic of Albania.
- Élie Lescot was overthrown as President of Haiti in a coup led by Colonel Paul Magloire, who then installed Franck Lavaud as the new president.
- Bert Bell was elected as the new Commissioner of the National Football League at the NFL owners' meeting in New York.
- Born:
  - Naomi Judd, American country singer; as Diana Ellen Judd in Ashland, Kentucky (d. 2022)
  - John Piper, American theologian and author of Love Your Enemies; in Chattanooga, Tennessee.

== January 12, 1946 (Saturday) ==
- Malcolm Little, 20, was arrested in Boston for breaking and entering. During his six years in prison, he joined the Nation of Islam, discarded his "slave name" and became Malcolm X.
- Anwar Sadat, 27, was arrested in Cairo on charges of conspiracy in the assassination of Amin Uthman. After 2 1/2 years imprisonment, he was acquitted, and, in 1970, became President of Egypt.

== January 13, 1946 (Sunday) ==
- A ceasefire took effect at midnight, Chongqing time, between the two sides in the Chinese Civil War. General George C. Marshall of the United States mediated the terms of the truce between General Chang Ch'un of the Nationalists, and Zhou Enlai of the Communists. (→ Marshall Mission)
- The Anchorage Daily News published its first issue. It is now the most widely read paper in Alaska.
- The "2-way wrist radio" was introduced in the comic strip Dick Tracy. Artist Chester Gould sparked the public's imagination of a future where everyone would have their own personal communication device.
- Died Wilhelm Souchon, 81, German admiral in World War I.

== January 14, 1946 (Monday) ==
- Eighteen nations signed the Agreement on Reparation from Germany, which took effect ten days later.
- The Soviet Union ratified a treaty signed between it and Poland on August 16, 1945, with most former Polish territory east of the Curzon Line becoming parts of the Ukrainian SSR (Lwów-> Lviv) and the Byelorussian SSR (Brzesc->Brest).
- Born: Harold Shipman, British serial killer; in Nottingham; (d. 2004)

== January 15, 1946 (Tuesday) ==
- Fourteen coal miners were killed in an explosion at Havaco, West Virginia, but another 253 escaped, despite the force of the blast.
- The SCAP force in Japan revealed the scope of Japan's operation of sending bombs to the United States on balloons. Between the summer of 1942 and March 1945, nine thousand bombs were launched, of which 225 landed in America.

== January 16, 1946 (Wednesday) ==
- The United Packinghouse Workers of America (CIO) and the Amalgamated Meat Cutters (AFL) called a strike against the six largest meat suppliers in the United States, with 268,000 workers going out on strike at 12:01 a.m. The strike was called off after 10 days when the U.S. government seized the plants.
- Born:
  - Kabir Bedi, Indian film actor; in Punjab
  - Katia Ricciarelli, Italian opera singer; in Rovetta

== January 17, 1946 (Thursday) ==
- The United Nations Security Council held its first session, called to order by Norman Makin, at 3:10 p.m. GMT, at Church House, Westminster. Convening around the horseshoe-shaped table were representatives from the five permanent members (the United States, the United Kingdom, the Soviet Union, France and China), each of whom had veto power, and the first six non-permanent members, whose membership would change from year to year. The first rotating spots were occupied by Australia, Brazil, Egypt, Mexico, the Netherlands and Poland.
- The Federal Reserve Board voted, effective January 21, to end margin buying on the nation's stock exchanges, the practice of buying stock for less than the face value and paying the difference later. Margin buying, which was very effective when the price of stock rose, but left a debt owed to the stockbroker if the value of the stock dropped, had been one of the factors in the Wall Street Crash of 1929.

== January 18, 1946 (Friday) ==
- Eastern Air Lines Flight 16-B, on the last leg of a flight from Miami to Boston, crashed in Cheshire, Connecticut, killing all 14 passengers and the crew of three.
- Mexico's ruling political party, the Partido de la Revolucion Mexicana, was renamed the Partido Revolucionario Institucional (PRI), at the direction of President Manuel Ávila Camacho. The PRI would continue to hold the presidency and the legislative majority until 2000.
- The musical film The Harvey Girls starring Judy Garland was released.
- Born: Joseph Deiss, President of Switzerland in 2004; in Fribourg

== January 19, 1946 (Saturday) ==
- The International Military Tribunal for the Far East, more commonly known as the Tokyo War Crimes Tribunal, was created by proclamation of General Douglas MacArthur. By 1948, the special tribunal would obtain 25 convictions, seven of them death sentences, for Japanese war criminals, including former Prime Minister Hideki Tōjō.
- The Liberal Party of the Philippines was founded.
- The United Nations Security Council took up its very first order of business, a formal protest by Iran against the Soviet Union for the Soviet occupation of Iran's Azerbaijani section.
- The Bell X-1 aircraft made its first glide flight at Pinecastle Field in Florida.
- Born:
  - Dolly Parton, American country singer, actress and philanthropist; in Sevierville, Tennessee (d. 2026)
  - Julian Barnes, English novelist; in Leicester

== January 20, 1946 (Sunday) ==
- Charles de Gaulle resigned as Chairman of the Provisional Government of the French Republic. The move has been described as "a bold and ultimately foolish political ploy", with de Gaulle hoping that, as a war hero, he would be soon brought back as a more powerful executive by the French people. He was succeeded by Félix Gouin.
- Born: David Lynch, American film director known for Twin Peaks and The Elephant Man); in Missoula, Montana (d.2025).

== January 21, 1946 (Monday) ==
- At one minute after midnight, the United Steel Workers of America began a nationwide walkout, as 750,000 steelworkers ceased work at U.S. steel mills. It was the largest strike in American history, and began after U.S. Steel had rejected proposals made at a Thursday White House meeting.

== January 22, 1946 (Tuesday) ==
Mahabad

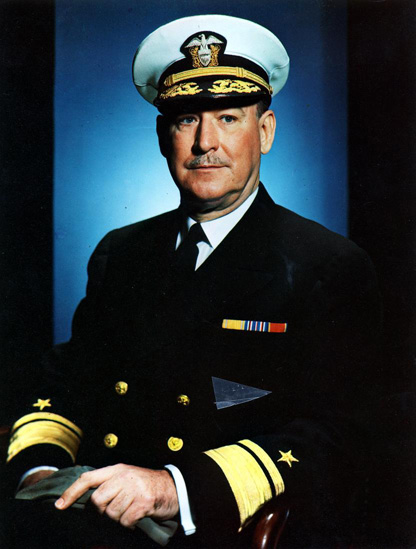
CIA Director Souers

- An independent Kurdish nation, the Republic of Mahabad, was proclaimed in Northern Iran by Qazi Muhammad, who was the new state's first President. Hadschi Baba Scheich was the prime minister. The Republic lasted until December, after Soviet troops withdrew from Iran, and the Iranian army reoccupied the area.
- By U.S. presidential directive, Harry S. Truman created the post of Director of Central Intelligence and established the Central Intelligence Group, predecessor to the CIA. In a ceremony two days later, Truman presented the new Director, Rear Admiral Sidney Souers, with a black hat, a black cloak, and a wooden dagger.
- Born: Serge Savard, Canadian NHL defenseman; in Landrienne, Quebec

== January 23, 1946 (Wednesday) ==
- The crew of the cargo ship USS Brevard rescued 4,296 Japanese civilians from the ship Enoshima Maru as it sank near Shanghai. The act is listed by Guinness for "Most people rescued at sea (civilians)".
- Harry Dexter White was nominated by U.S. President Truman to be the American representative to the International Monetary Fund, despite a warning from the FBI that White had passed secret information to the Soviet Union. White was confirmed by the Senate on February 6 and would serve until 1947.
- Sir Ramaswami Mudaliar of India became the first President of the United Nations Economic and Social Council at its inaugural session in London.
- Born: Boris Berezovsky, Russian billionaire; in Moscow. (d. 2013)

== January 24, 1946 (Thursday) ==
- UN Resolution 1, the very first resolution of the UN General Assembly, created the United Nations Atomic Energy Commission. The UNAEC was to seek "the elimination from national armaments of atomic weapons and of all other weapons adaptable to mass destruction".
- Baron Kijūrō Shidehara, the Prime Minister of Japan, suggested to American administrator Douglas MacArthur that, in return for keeping the Emperor as ceremonial Head of State, the new Constitution of Japan would include what would become, as Chapter II, the Renunciation of War.
- Igor Stravinsky's Symphony in Three Movements was performed for the first time, by the New York Philharmonic orchestra.

== January 25, 1946 (Friday) ==
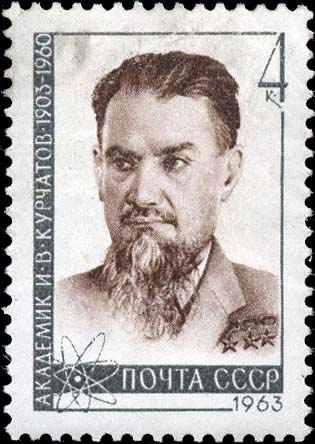
Kurchatov

- The Soviet Union's quest for the atomic bomb began, as Soviet physicist Igor Kurchatov was summoned to Moscow by Joseph Stalin for a 50-minute meeting that began at 8:15 pm. Kurchatov was ordered to spare no expense in getting nuclear weapons. At the time, only the United States had "the bomb". By 1950, there were 400,000 people working on the project.
- The United Mine Workers rejoined the American Federation of Labor, after John L. Lewis had removed the 500,000 member union in 1940.
- The expulsion of Germans from Czechoslovakia began as hundreds of Sudetenland residents were loaded onto trains at Mariánské Lázně.
- Despite a public outcry, Sweden began the deportation of refugees from Latvia, Lithuania and Estonia back to the Soviet Union. The first group consisted of 151 Latvian, 9 Lithuanian and 7 Estonian refugees, whom the Soviets had identified.
- The United Nations Security Council passed its first resolution, the creation of the Military Staff Committee.
- General Douglas MacArthur recommended in a telegram, to the U.S. Joint Chiefs of Staff, that Japan's Emperor Hirohito not be put on trial for war crimes, noting that "No specific and tangible evidence has been uncovered" and adding that "his indictment will unquestionably cause a tremendous convulsion among the Japanese people, the repercussions of which cannot be over-estimated." Hirohito continued to reign as Emperor of Japan until his death in 1989.
- Jinja Honcho, the Association of Shinto Shrines, was established in a convention of representatives from all 46 prefectures in Japan.
- Following the liberation of the Dutch East Indies (now Indonesia), the Allied Forces returned control of the colony to the Netherlands.

== January 26, 1946 (Saturday) ==
- By a margin of 51 to 50, Ahmad Qavam es Saltaneh was elected by the Majlis of Iran as the new Prime Minister. The vote was 51 for Qavam, 50 for Hossein Pirnia, and one for Ebrahim Hakimi, who had resigned a week earlier.
- The U.S. Department of Agriculture, acting under the authority of the War Labor Disputes Act and the direction of President Truman, seized 133 meatpacking plants affected by the nationwide walkout of 248,000 union members that had begun ten days earlier.
- Bikini Atoll, part of the Marshall Islands, was selected as the test site for United States nuclear bombs because of its isolated location, its favorable winds, its deep harbor and small population of 166.
- The SS Argentina departed from Southampton for New York with 452 war brides, 173 small children, and one "war bridegroom" married to a WAC.
- French troops clashed with Vietnamese rebels at Phong Thổ District in the first battle between the two sides in French Indochina. The Viet Quoc Armed Force unit under Deo Van Bao surrendered after a two-day battle.
- Born: Gene Siskel, American film critic known for the film review TV program Siskel & Ebert); in Chicago (d. 1999)

== January 27, 1946 (Sunday) ==
- The first multiparty elections, in almost 15 years, to take place in Germany were conducted in the American occupied zone. The new Christian Democratic Union (CDU) won more local offices than any other, and the revived Social Democrat Party (SPD). Similar elections followed in the French, British and Soviet zones. In 1949, parliamentary elections for the Bundestag would be allowed.
- Australian radar and television expert W.E. Osborne told an American audience that within fifty years, passenger travel to the Moon would be possible. Including stops at orbiting refuel stations, the trip would take ninety hours.

== January 28, 1946 (Monday) ==
- In Japan, the Civil Censorship Department was established by the American occupation authority, to cut prohibited material from Japanese films before release. Prohibited subjects included scenes favorably depicting revenge, racial or religious discrimination, violence, militarism, Japanese nationalism, feudalism, or the exploitation of women or children. Censorship continued until June 1947.

== January 29, 1946 (Tuesday) ==
- Trygve Lie was appointed as the first Secretary General of the United Nations by unanimous vote of the Security Council.
- Died:
  - Harry Hopkins, 55, adviser to Franklin Roosevelt for New Deal policies
  - Sidney Jones, 84, British composer

== January 30, 1946 (Wednesday) ==
- The "Roosevelt dime" was introduced on the birthday of the late President of the United States, Franklin D. Roosevelt, replacing the "Mercury dime"
- Transcarpathia (also known as Ruthenia) legally became the Zakarpattia Oblast of the Ukrainian Soviet Socialist Republic as a treaty between Czechoslovakia and the Soviet Union entered into force.

== January 31, 1946 (Thursday) ==
- The Federative People's Republic of Yugoslavia was established with the promulgation of a new constitution that established a federation of six constituent republics and replaced the Kingdom of Yugoslavia with a presidential government.
- Hungary was proclaimed a Republic under a provisional constitutional statute that formally abolished the monarchy.
- The population of the island of Nauru more than doubled as the 591 surviving residents on the island were joined by 737 who were returned from the island of Truk.
- Eurico Gaspar Dutra, took office as Brazil's first popularly elected president in fifteen years.
- The Permanent Court of International Justice, created in 1920 as a part of the League of Nations, came to an end with the resignation of its judges. The new International Court of Justice was created on April 18.
- United Airlines Flight 14, flying at an altitude of 10,000 feet en route from Boise to Denver, crashed into the side of 11,161-foot-tall (3,402 m) Elk Mountain, Wyoming, killing all 21 persons on board.
- Born: Terry Kath, American rock musician for the band (Chicago); in Chicago; (d. 1978)
