= Gaoyou–Shaobo campaign =

1945 military campaign

- Part of the Chinese Civil War
Date	December 19, 1945 – December 26, 1945
Location	Jiangsu, China
Result	Communist victory

Belligerents
Flag of the National Revolutionary Army National Revolutionary Army	PLA Chinese Red Army

Commanders and leaders
Unknown	Su Yu; Tan Zhenlin

Strength
5,200	10,000+

Casualties and losses
5,200	Unknown

Gaoyou–Shaobo campaign was a campaign fought at the Gaoyou and the region between Gaoyou and Shaobo (邵伯) in Jiangsu, and it was a clash between the communists and the former nationalists turned Japanese puppet regime force who rejoined the nationalists after World War II, and their Japanese ally. The campaign is also known as Gaoyou campaign (高邮战役) for short, and it was one of the Chinese Civil War in the immediate post World War II era resulted in communist victory.

== Order of battle ==
Nationalist

- 7 Regiments of 42nd Division of the former nationalists turned Japanese puppet regime force who rejoined the nationalists
- 3 Battalions of the Japanese 90th Brigade
- Nationalist troops stationed at Yangzhou

Communist

- 8th Column
- 7th Column

== Campaign ==
The campaign begun on December 19, 1945, when Japanese and their puppet regime forces occupying Gaoyou refused to surrender to the local communist force which then decided to take the city by force. By next day, Shaobo (邵伯), the important town in the south had fallen into communist hands in the Battle of Shaobo.

The communist control of Shaobo (邵伯) ensured the escape route of the defenders of Gaoyou was severed, and a line of communist defense against possible nationalist reinforcement to Gaoyou from Yangzhou and Taizhou, Jiangsu had formed along the Shaobo (邵伯) – Dinggou (丁沟) regions, manned by the communist 7th Column which took the town of Shaobo (邵伯). By December 21, 1945, the communist 8th Column had taken all nationalist strongholds outside the city wall, and launched heavy political propaganda offensives against the defenders of Gaoyou while making the preparation to take the city at the same time.

In the evening of December 25, 1945, communist attackers launched their assault on the city in the heavy rain from three directions: northwest, east and south. The attackers succeeded in driving the defenders from the city wall after climbing the walls with ladders, and as the main force of the communist 8th Column fought their way into the city, the defenders were completely annihilated. By the early morning of December 26, 1945, the Japanese brigade headquarter in the city was taken and the remaining defenders consisted of mostly Japanese troops ceased their resistance and surrendered. In the meantime, the communist 7th Column also had successfully driven back the nationalist reinforcement from Yangzhou.

The nationalist forces were not very enthusiastic about reinforcing their former enemy at Gaoyou, and those from Yangzhou did not put too much fight and withdrew back to Yangzhou soon, while those nationalist troops from Taizhou, Jiangsu did not even bother to send out anyone to reinforce Gaoyou. Nonetheless, the nationalists had suffered a great debacle in winning popular support from local populace for attempting to reinforce their former enemy, the Japanese invaders and their puppet regime force. The communists, on the other hands, not only achieved a great popularity victory, but also succeeded in capturing more than 80 artillery pieces, over 6,000 firearms, and inflicted over 1,100 casualties on the Japanese, plus another 4,000+ casualties on the Japanese puppet regime force.

== See also ==
- Outline of the Chinese Civil War
- National Revolutionary Army
- History of the People's Liberation Army
