= February 1946 =

Month of 1946

<<	February 1946					>>
Su	Mo	Tu	We	Th	Fr	Sa
					1	2
3	4	5	6	7	8	9
10	11	12	13	14	15	16
17	18	19	20	21	22	23
24	25	26	27	28

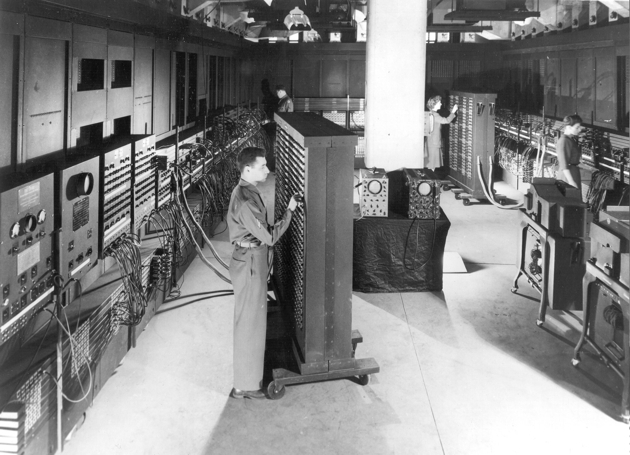
February 14, 1946: ENIAC, the first general-purpose electronic computer, begins operation. This photo has been artificially darkened, obscuring details such as the women who were present and the IBM equipment in use.

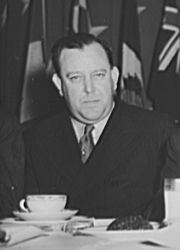
February 1, 1946: Trygve Lie becomes first UN Secretary General

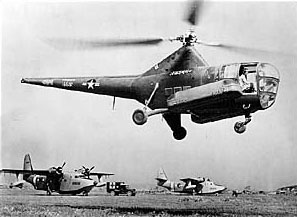
February 16, 1946: The S-51, the first commercial helicopter, makes its first flight

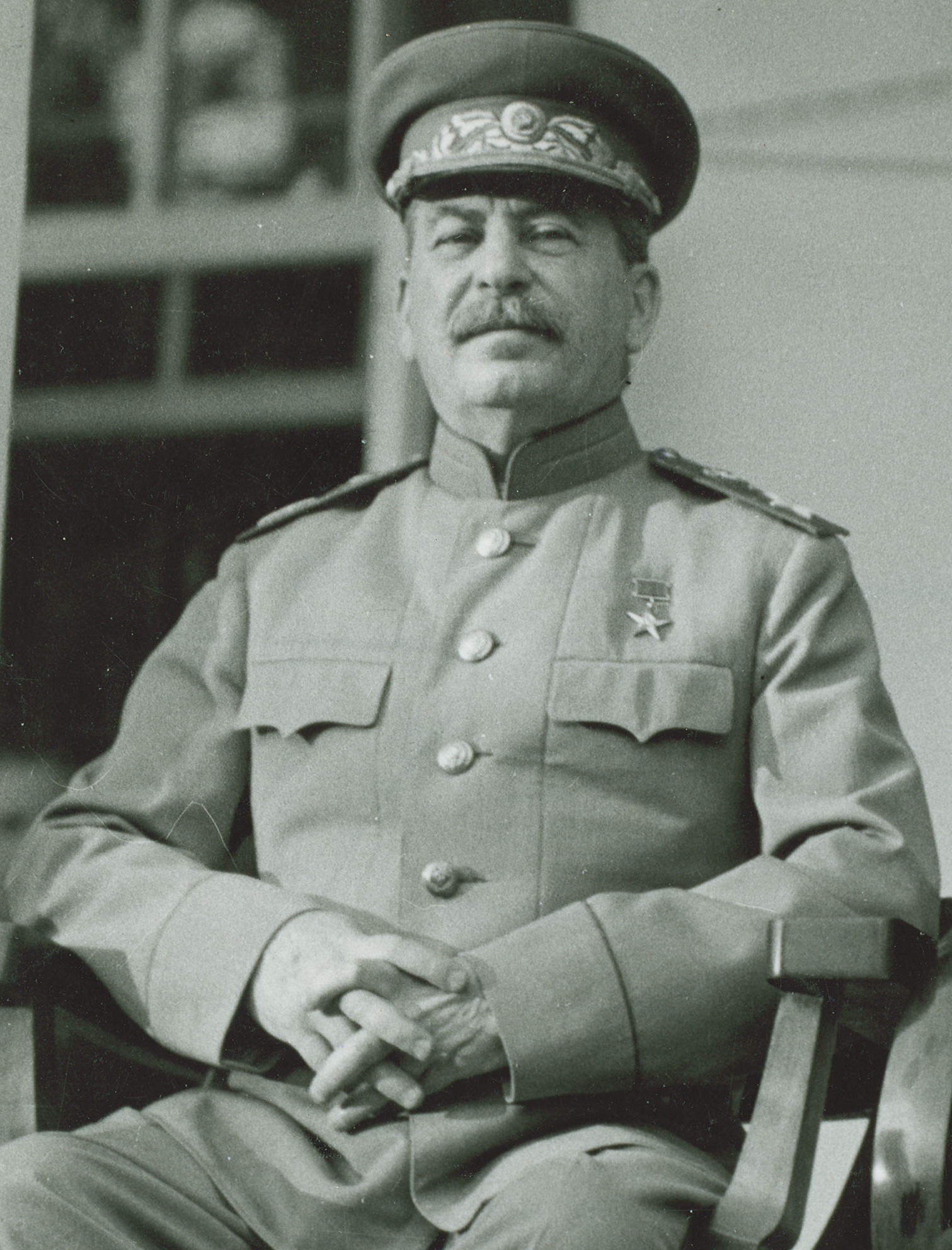
February 9, 1946: Stalin says that Inter-Capitalist war is inevitable

The following events occurred in February 1946:

== February 1, 1946 (Friday) ==
- Trygve Lie was sworn in as the first Secretary General of the United Nations.
- Syria and the Soviet Union secretly signed a treaty for military advisers to come to Syria. A treaty between the USSR and Lebanon was signed two days later.
- Zoltán Tildy was sworn into office as the first President of Hungary, and Ferenc Nagy succeeded Tildy as Prime Minister. Both were forced out by the Communist party within two years.

== February 2, 1946 (Saturday) ==
- The Soviet Union formally annexed the Japanese Kuril Islands.
- Two unusually large sunspots disrupted radio communication between North America and Europe between 4:05 am and 7:00 am EST.
- A fire in a retirement home in Garfield Heights, Ohio, killed 33 people.
- The popular quiz show Twenty Questions, hosted by Fred van Deventer, premiered on the Mutual Broadcasting System radio network and began a nine-year run on radio and later on the DuMont and ABC television networks.
- Born:
  - Isaias Afwerki, first, and thus far, only President of Eritrea since the east African nation became independent in 1991; in Asmara
  - Alpha Oumar Konaré, third President of Mali (1992–2002); in Kayes
  - Blake Clark, American actor and comedian; in Macon, Georgia
- Died: Rondo Hatton, 51, American horror movie star, died of a heart attack.

== February 3, 1946 (Sunday) ==
- NBC Radio commentator Drew Pearson broke the news of what would become known as the "Gouzenko Affair": a Soviet spy ring had been operating in Canada, and that the spy agency GRU had been transmitting American atomic secrets from Ottawa to Moscow.
- Died: Friedrich Jeckeln, 51, SS commander during the Nazi occupation of the Soviet Union, was hanged in public at Pobeda Square in Riga, along with five of his officers. Jeckeln oversaw the deaths of more than 250,000 people, mostly Jewish, during the Second World War.

== February 4, 1946 (Monday) ==
- National weather forecasts returned to American newspapers after four years. Publication of maps had ceased on December 15, 1941, a week after the United States entered World War II.

== February 5, 1946 (Tuesday) ==
- The first scheduled Trans-Atlantic commercial airplane flight was made when the "Star of Paris", a TWA Constellation, took off at 2:21 pm from New York's La Guardia airport. The plane landed in Paris 14 hours and 48 minutes later.
- Plaza México, the world's largest (55,000 seats) bullring, was opened in Mexico City.
- The Tishomingo National Wildlife Refuge was established in Oklahoma by order of President Truman.
- Born: Charlotte Rampling, British film actress; in Sturmer, Essex
- Died: George Arliss, 77, Oscar-winning British actor

== February 6, 1946 (Wednesday) ==
- Charles Vyner Brooke, the "White Rajah" of the State of Sarawak, ceded the state's sovereignty to the United Kingdom as a British Crown Colony. Sarawak is now part of Malaysia. Cession came to pass on July 1.

== February 7, 1946 (Thursday) ==
- In its colony in Vietnam, the military forces of France made a large scale assault to recapture the Bến Tre Province, which had been under control of the Viet Minh since August 25, 1945. The province was quickly brought back under French rule, but guerilla activity continued.

== February 8, 1946 (Friday) ==
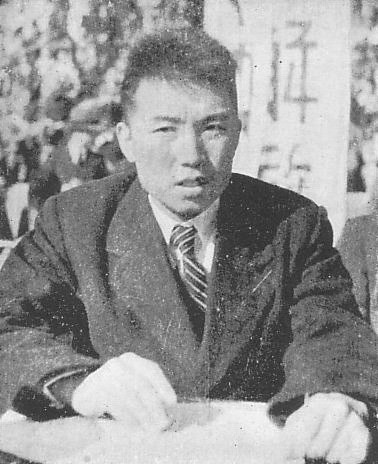
Kim Il-sung

- Kim Il Sung was elected Chairman of the Interim People's Committee in the Soviet occupied portion of Korea. Kim, who led the northern branch of the Korean Communist Party, would become the first leader of North Korea.
- Died: Miles Mander, 57, English actor and director, died of a heart attack while dining in the Brown Derby restaurant in Los Angeles.

== February 9, 1946 (Saturday) ==
- In what has been described as the beginning of the Cold War, Soviet leader Joseph Stalin addressed a national radio audience in his first major public speech after the end of World War II. Stalin said that another war was inevitable because of the "capitalist development of the world economy", and that the USSR would need to concentrate on national defense in advance of a war with the Western nations.
- In the most well-known example of a recurrent nova, T Coronae Borealis, nicknamed the "blaze star", was seen to flare up almost 80 years after a nova seen on May 12, 1866.
- Charles "Lucky" Luciano, an American Mafia boss, was transported from a New York prison to an ocean liner, and deported to his native Italy.

== February 10, 1946 (Sunday) ==
- In the first election in the Soviet Union since 1937, there was a reported turnout of 101,450,936 voters (99.7% of those eligible). For the 682 deputies of the Soviet of the Union, and the 657 members of the Soviet of Nationalities, the candidates were unopposed and the choice was yes-or-no. Of the 1,339 candidates, there were 254 who were not Communist Party members.
- The ocean liner Queen Mary docked at Pier 90 in New York City, bringing 1,666 war brides and their 668 children.

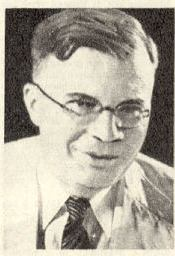
Mook

- Hubertus van Mook, the Governor-General of the Dutch East Indies, proposed a plan for Indonesia's people to choose independence or Dutch citizenship as part of the Kingdom of the Netherlands.
- Commodore Ben Wyatt, Military Governor of the Marshall Islands, informed the 167 residents of the Bikini Atoll that they would be relocated, so that atomic bomb testing could take place. Wyatt told the villagers that their sacrifice was "for the good of mankind and to end all wars".

== February 11, 1946 (Monday) ==
- The Revised Standard Version of the New Testament was formally introduced by the International Council of Religious Education at its 1946 meeting, at Central High School in Columbus, Ohio.
- The Yalta Agreement was published one year to the day after it had been signed, in simultaneous releases in Washington, D.C. (9:00 am), London (2:00 pm), and Moscow (5:00 pm).

== February 12, 1946 (Tuesday) ==
- Trans Australia Airlines made its first flight.
- In advance of the presidential election in Argentina, the U.S. State Department issued a 121-page "blue book", with evidence that Argentina, and candidate Juan Perón, had aided Nazi Germany during World War II. Perón won the election in spite of the American publication.
- Sgt. Isaac Woodard, an African-American U.S. Army veteran, was beaten and blinded by the police chief in Batesburg, South Carolina. Woodard's maiming attracted national attention on Orson Welles's radio show and was later dramatized in the 1958 Welles movie Touch of Evil, as well as in Woody Guthrie's song The Blinding of Isaac Woodard. Woodard died in 1992. His assailant, Lindwood Shull, was acquitted by a federal court, and lived until 1997.

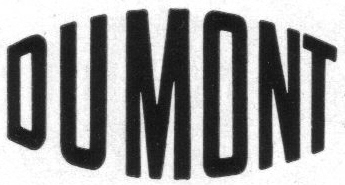
DuMont TV network

- The DuMont Television Network made the first network telecast, transmitting, by cable, video and audio of Lincoln's Birthday celebrations from its station in Washington, D.C. (W3XWT), to its New York affiliate, WABD. The NBC and CBS stations in New York also received the DuMont broadcast.

== February 13, 1946 (Wednesday) ==
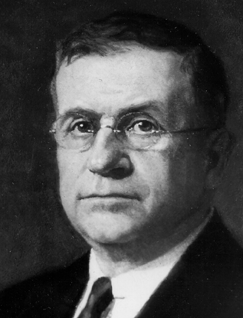
Ickes

- Harold L. Ickes, the U.S. Secretary of the Interior since 1933, resigned in protest after President Truman said that Ickes could have been "wrong" in testimony given to a U.S. Senate committee about Truman's nominee for Undersecretary of the Navy. Ickes wrote "I cannot stay on when you, in effect, have expressed a lack of confidence in me."
- Born: Colin Matthews, British composer; in London

== February 14, 1946 (Thursday) ==
- The Bank of England was nationalised, with the signing of a 250-page bill by King George VI.
- The U.S. Army introduced ENIAC, the Electronic Numerical Integrator And Computer, to the public in a press conference at the University of Pennsylvania in Philadelphia. The world's first electronic computer weighed 30 tons, had 18,000 vacuum tubes, and was 8 feet (2.4 m) tall, 3 feet (0.91 m) deep, and 100 feet (30 m) long. One of the computer's first tests was computing trajectories for rocket launching, "completing in ten days a job which would have required three months of concentrated effort by a mathematician".
- Born:
  - Bernard Dowiyogo, President of Nauru, 1989–1995; in the Ubenide Constituency (d. 2003)
  - Gregory Hines, American dancer and actor; in New York City (d. 2003)

== February 15, 1946 (Friday) ==
- Twenty-two current and former Canadian government employees were arrested by the Royal Canadian Mounted Police, after Soviet defector Igor Gouzenko had provided a list of 1,700 North American informants who were providing classified information to the U.S.S.R.
- The United Steel Workers of America and the United States Steel Corporation brought an end to the strike that had begun on January 21, with 130,000 employees returning to work on February 18 in return for an 18 1/2 cent per hour wage increase.
- Died: Cornelius Johnson, 32, American high jump record holder and 1936 Olympic gold medalist, died of pneumonia

== February 16, 1946 (Saturday) ==
- The first UN Security Council veto was made, as the Soviet Union killed a resolution concerning the withdrawal of British and French forces from Syria and Lebanon.
- Frozen french fries were introduced. Pre-fried by Maxson Food Systems of Long Island, New York, and made to be baked in the oven, the product was first sold at Macy's in New York, but were not immediately popular. American per-capita potato consumption had declined since 1910, and was not measured at previous levels until 1962, when french fries were a fast-food restaurant staple.
- The Sikorsky S-51, the first helicopter sold for commercial rather than military use, was flown for the first time.

== February 17, 1946 (Sunday) ==
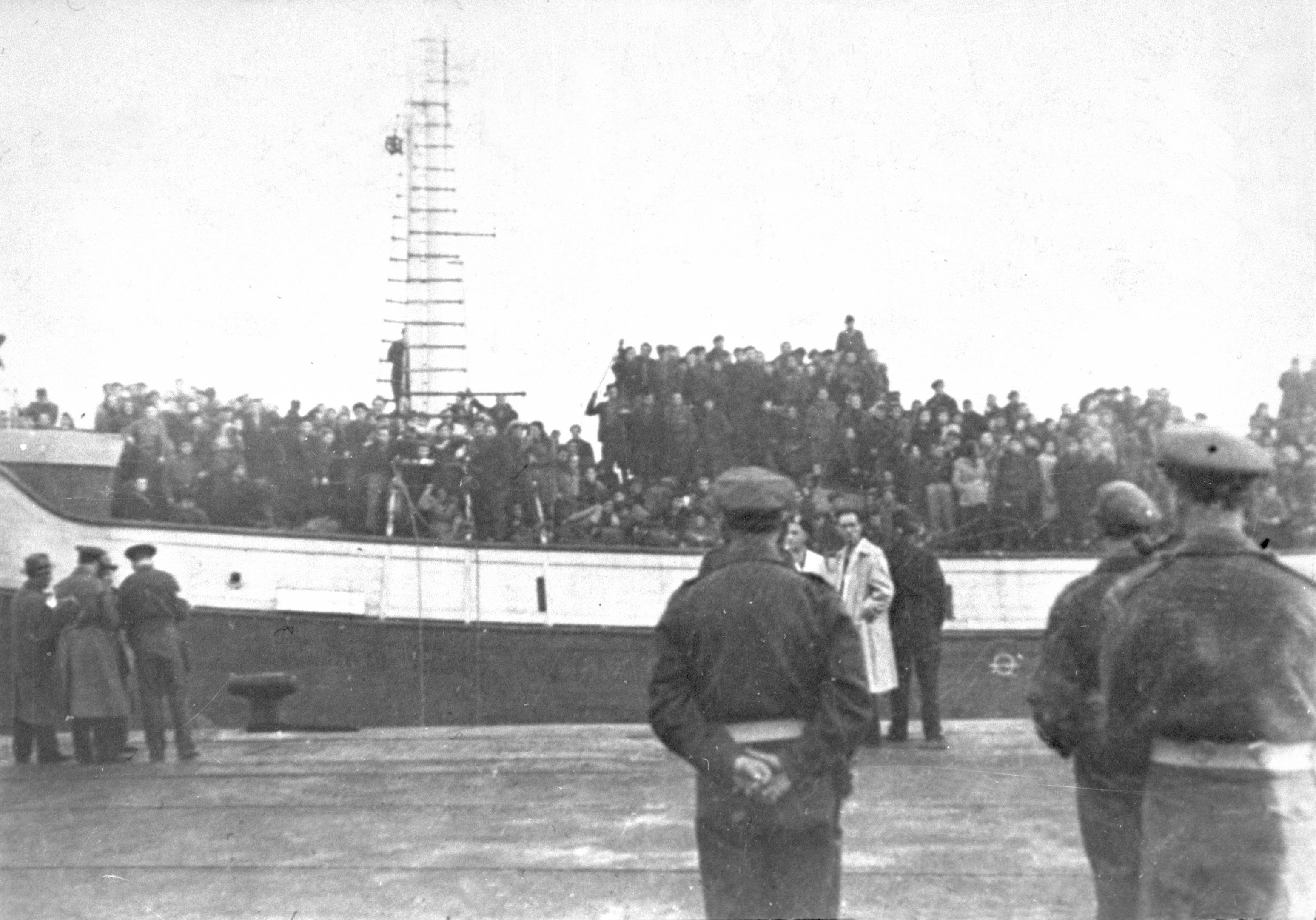
Enzo Sereni ship

- In a policy of preventing Jewish immigration to Palestine, British authorities intercepted the ship Enzo Sereni, with 915 refugees on board. The Zionist group Palmach retaliated three days later with the destruction of a British Coast Guard station.
- Ismail Sidky became the new Prime Minister of the Kingdom of Egypt, succeeding Mahmoud El Nokrashy Pasha. Nokrashy would return in December.
- Died: Dorothy Gibson, 56, American silent film star, died of a stroke.

== February 18, 1946 (Monday) ==
- The Royal Indian Navy Mutiny began at 8:00 am at the port of Colaba near Bombay (now Mumbai). In the first mutiny in British India since 1857, a group of 1,600 sailors ("ratings") from HMIS Talwar walked out of the mess hall because of inadequate food, and began to chant, "No food, no work". The next day, another 20,000 ratings in Bombay joined the strike, and over the next days, rioting broke out. Before order was restored on February 24, there were 223 deaths and 1,037 injuries.
- Pope Pius XII announced the appointment of 32 new Roman Catholic cardinals, the first since 1940. Twenty-eight of the appointees received the red hat in Rome on February 21.
- A federal judge in California ruled that segregation in four school districts was unconstitutional. Schools in El Modena, Garden Grove, Westminster and Santa Ana had separated Mexican-American students from English-speaking students. Two months later, California repealed a law permitting segregated schools for Asian-Americans. The decision in Mendez v. Westminster was upheld on appeal in 1947.
- Born: Karen Silkwood, American activist and subject of 1983 film Silkwood; in Longview, Texas (killed, 1974)

== February 19, 1946 (Tuesday) ==
- The Cabinet Mission to India was announced in the British House of Commons by Lord Pethick-Lawrence, the Secretary of State for India. He, along with Sir Stafford Cripps of the Board of Trade, and Albert V. Alexander, the Minister of Defence, would depart on March 15 in order to meet with representatives on the eventual independence of British India.

== February 20, 1946 (Wednesday) ==
- The American Employment Act of 1946, 15 U.S.C. § 1021, was signed into law by President Truman.
- British Prime Minister Clement Attlee announced plans "to effect the transference of power to responsible India hands by a date not later than June 1948".
- The Allied Powers government in Japan ended the three century old tradition of "kōshō" licensed prostitution.
- Born: Sandy Duncan, American comedian, stage and TV actress, and singer; in New London, Texas

== February 21, 1946 (Thursday) ==
- Uprisings against colonial rule took place across Asia, with disturbances in Egypt, India, Singapore and Indonesia.
- Americans United for World Government was announced as the new name for the two-year-old global federalist group Americans United for World Organization. AUWG Chairman Raymond Swing announced that there was need for a world government to control atomic weapons.
- Born:
  - Alan Rickman, English film actor (Harry Potter); in Hammersmith, London (d. 2016)
  - Tyne Daly, American TV and stage actress known for Cagney and Lacey; in Madison, Wisconsin

== February 22, 1946 (Friday) ==
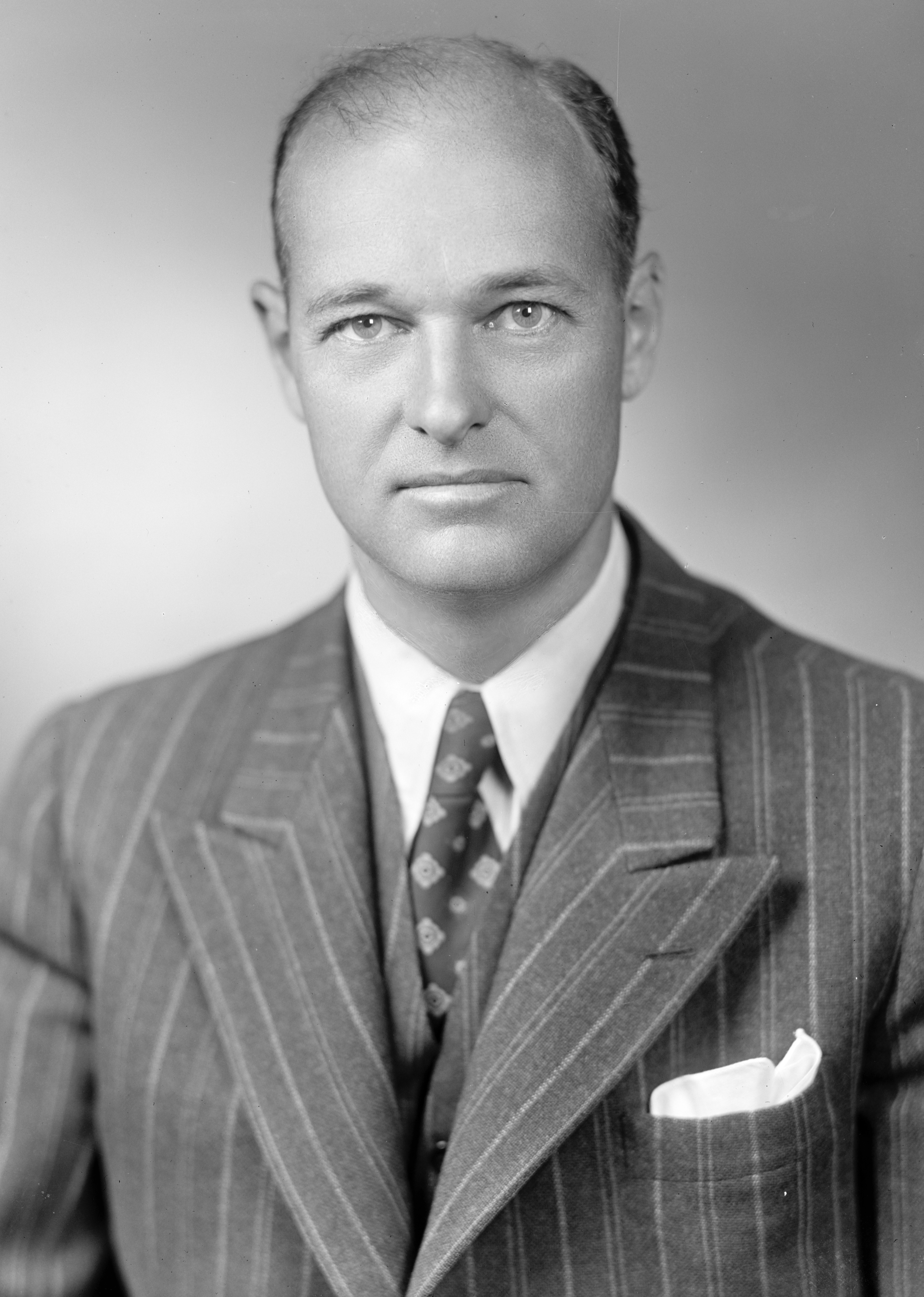
"Long Telegram" author Kennan

- "The Long Telegram" was sent from the U.S. Embassy in Moscow to the U.S. Department of State and would become the basis of American foreign policy for nearly fifty years. At more than 8,000 words, it was the longest telegraphed message sent to that time. The author, George F. Kennan, the chargé d'affaires at the American embassy, was responding to a specific inquiry from the State Department, and his answer was the containment strategy, to keep the Soviet Union from spreading Communism further without going to war. Kennan sent the telegram at 9:00 pm Moscow time (1:00 pm EST), and it was received in Washington at 3:52 EST.
- The first attacks in the Texarkana Moonlight Murders took place when a couple on a date, 25-year-old Jimmy Hollis and his girlfriend, Mary Larey, were attacked and seriously injured. Both survived, but six other people would be attacked over the next three months, five of them fatally, by a serial killer who has never been identified.

== February 23, 1946 (Saturday) ==
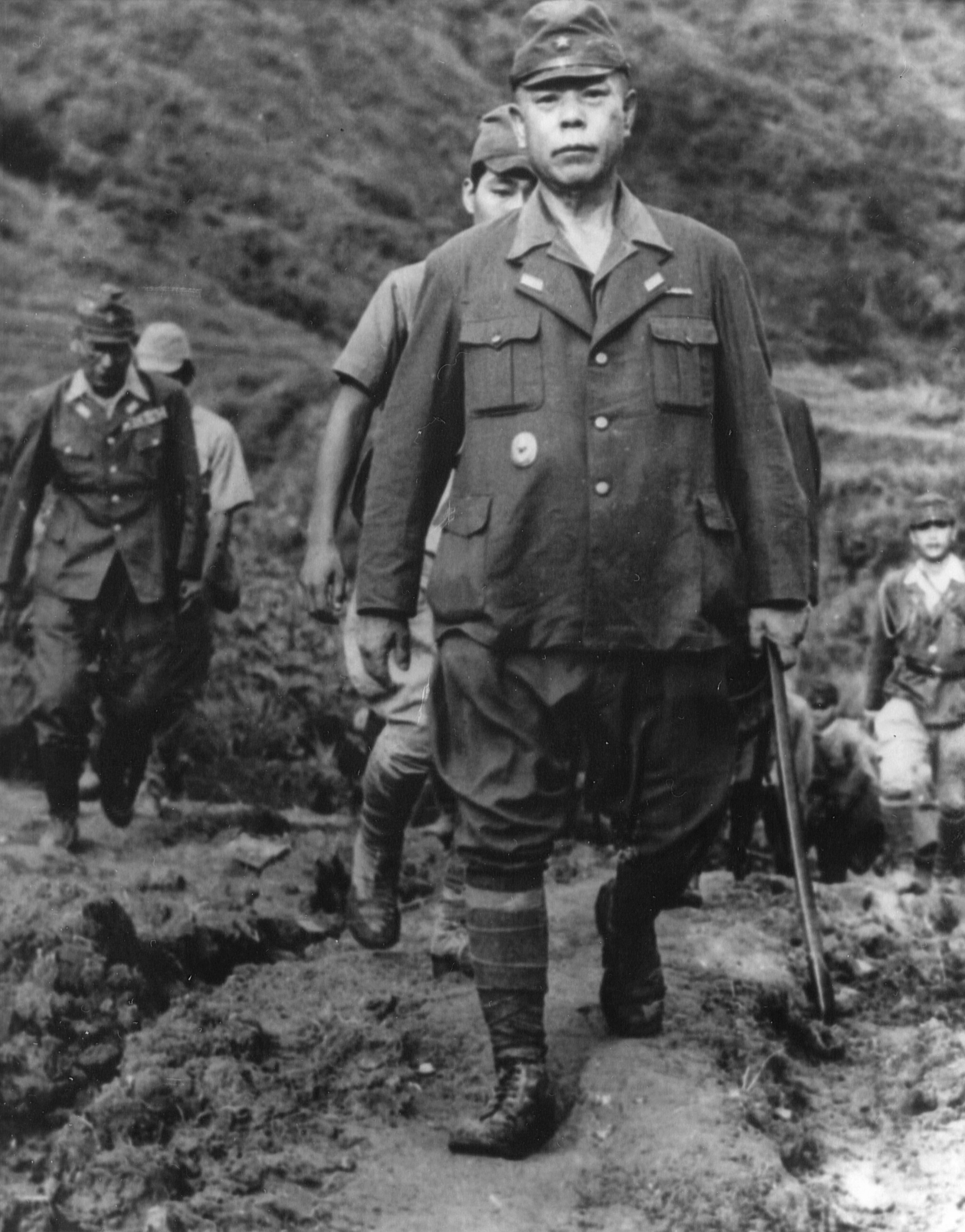
Lt. Gen. Yamashita

- Lieutenant General Tomoyuki Yamashita, who led the Japanese conquest of Singapore and the Philippines, was executed by hanging in Manila for war crimes, followed by Lt. Col. Seichi Ohta, who had headed security for Japan's "thought police" (kempei tai), and interpreter Takuma Higashigi.

== February 24, 1946 (Sunday) ==
- Juan Perón won the vote for President of Argentina in what was considered the first truly open election since 1928. Perón defeated José Tamborini, and the Peronist Labour Party won 101 of the 158 seats in the Argentine Chamber of Deputies.
- Died:
  - U.S. Representative J. Buell Snyder, 68, died of a heart attack in his hotel room in Pittsburgh.
  - "Powder River Jack" Lee, 73, African-American rodeo singer, was killed in an auto accident.

== February 25, 1946 (Monday) ==
- African American residents of Columbia, Tennessee, took up arms after white residents sought to lynch James Stephenson, a 19-year-old U.S. Navy veteran. Four white police officers were shot and wounded after trying to enter the black section of town, and the Tennessee Highway Patrol moved in the next morning, arresting more than 100 residents, two of whom died in jail. The Civil Rights Congress, a Communist Party USA defense fund, was formed to aid in the defense of the arrest subjects.
- Born: Jean Todt, French motorsport boss; in Pierrefort

== February 26, 1946 (Tuesday) ==
- The Sozialistische Einheitspartei Deutschlands (SED) was started in the Soviet Zone of Germany, when the Social Democratic Party was pressured to unite with the Communist Party. The SED, Communist in all but name, would rule East Germany for all but the last six months of that nation's existence.
- The Scandinavian phenomenon of "ghost rockets" was first observed, by observers in Finland. Thousands of reported sightings of the unidentified objects were made throughout 1946.
- A tabloid newspaper of France, L'Équipe had its first issue edition published.
- Born: Ahmed Zewail, Egyptian femtochemistry pioneer and 1999 Nobel Prize in Chemistry laureate; in Damanhour (d. 2016)
- Died:
  - Frank Crowe, 63, American engineer
  - George Dealey, 86, Texas philanthropist

== February 27, 1946 (Wednesday) ==
- Former U.S. President Herbert Hoover was asked by President Harry Truman to assist in persuading Americans to assist in famine relief worldwide.

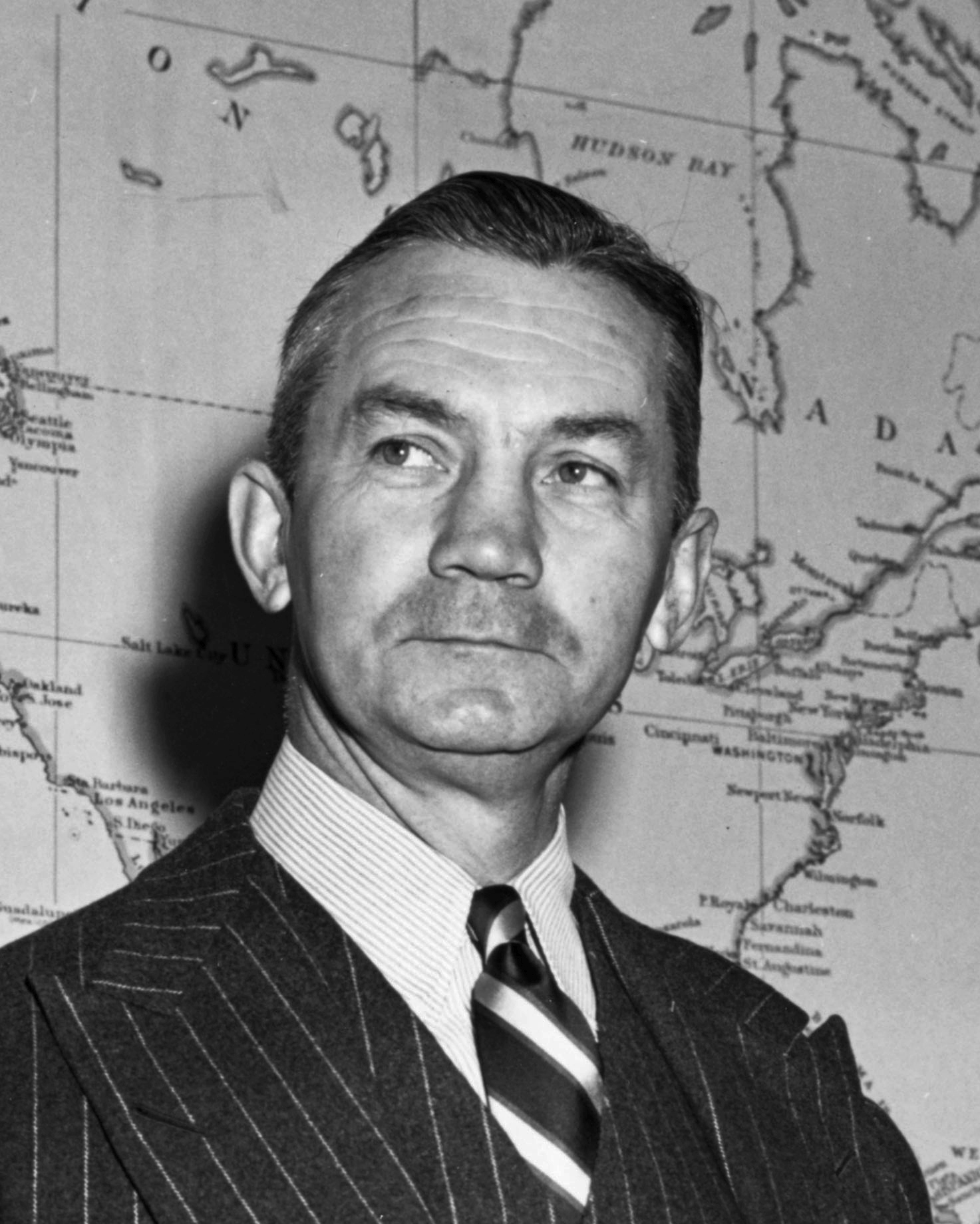
Forrestal

- After reviewing a report from National Urban League executive Lester Granger's tour of naval bases worldwide, U.S. Navy Secretary James Forrestal issued the order (applying to the United States Navy only), "Effective immediately, all restrictions governing the types of assignments for which Negro naval personnel are eligible are hereby lifted."
- U.S. Senator Arthur H. Vandenberg of Michigan further set the tone for the Cold War, in a famous speech in which he asked the rhetorical question, "What is Russia up to now?", and criticized the Truman Administration's policy of appeasement toward the Soviets. Vandenberg, the highest ranking Republican on the Senate Foreign Relations Committee, would become its Chairman when the Republican Party won a majority in both houses in the 1946 mid-term elections.
- The comedy film Road to Utopia, starring Bing Crosby, Bob Hope and Dorothy Lamour was released.

== February 28, 1946 (Thursday) ==
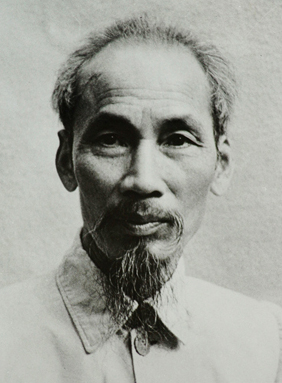
President Ho

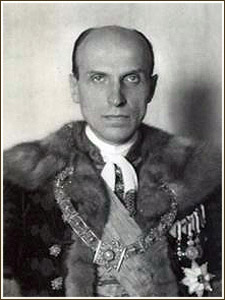
Former Premier Imredy

- Ho Chi Minh, the newly elected President of Vietnam, sent a telegram to U.S. President Harry S. Truman, asking that the United States use its influence to persuade France not to send occupation forces back into Vietnam, and to "interfere urgently in support of our independence". Truman's reply was that the U.S. would support France, and Ho sought assistance from the Soviet Union instead.
- Born: Robin Cook, Scottish politician, Leader of the British House of Commons, 2001–2003; in Bellshill, Lanarkshire; (d. 2005)
- Died: Béla Imrédy, 54, former Prime Minister of Hungary from 1938 to 1939, was executed by firing squad for collaboration with the Nazis.
