= November 1945 =

Month of 1945

<<	November 1945					>>
Su	Mo	Tu	We	Th	Fr	Sa
				1	2	3
4	5	6	7	8	9	10
11	12	13	14	15	16	17
18	19	20	21	22	23	24
25	26	27	28	29	30

The following events occurred in November 1945:

== November 1, 1945 (Thursday) ==
- Night of the Trains: In one of its first operations, the Jewish Resistance Movement carried out a sabotage operation of the British railways in Palestine.
- British intelligence officers announced that exhaustive investigation indicated that Adolf Hitler and Eva Braun had married on April 29 and then committed suicide in a Berlin bunker the following day.
- 21 German bankers were arrested on suspicion of war crimes.
- Australia ratified the United Nations Charter.
- Former Governor of Kentucky Happy Chandler became the 2nd Commissioner of Baseball.
- The first issue of Ebony magazine was published.

== November 2, 1945 (Friday) ==
- 42 staff members of Dachau concentration camp were indicted at Nuremberg.
- Balfour Day riots against Jews in Alexandria and Cairo.
- The Handan Campaign and Weixian–Guangling–Nuanquan Campaign ended in communist victory.
- Costa Rica and Liberia ratified the United Nations Charter.
- "Good Bad Books" by George Orwell was published in Tribune.
- Born: JD Souther, musician and actor, in Detroit, Michigan (d. 2024)
- Died: Petar Drapšin, 30, Yugoslav Partisan commander

== November 3, 1945 (Saturday) ==
- The 3 November 1945 declaration was made in Indonesia, encouraging the formation of political parties as part of democracy.
- Irvin Charles Mollison was sworn in as a U.S. Customs Court judge in New York City, becoming the first African-American to serve on the federal bench within the continental United States.
- Born: Gerd Müller, footballer, in Nördlingen, Germany (d. 2021)

== November 4, 1945 (Sunday) ==
- Riots by Arabs in Libya killed at least 121 Jews. British troops fired on the rioters and arrested over 500.
- Parliamentary elections were held in Hungary, won by the Independent Smallholders Party.
- The Dynamo Moscow football team touched down in London for a goodwill tour of friendly matches against British teams.

== November 5, 1945 (Monday) ==
- 43,000 dockers in Britain ended their unofficial seven-week strike.
- Colombia ratified the United Nations Charter.
- The U.S. Supreme Court decided United States v. Detroit & Cleveland Navigation Co.

== November 6, 1945 (Tuesday) ==
- The short-lived Inner Mongolian People's Republic was disestablished after two months.
- William O'Dwyer was elected Mayor of New York City.
- The play State of the Union by Russel Crouse and Howard Lindsay premiered at the National Theatre in Washington, D.C.

== November 7, 1945 (Wednesday) ==
- Knud Kristensen became Prime Minister of Denmark.
- RAF Pilot Hugh J. Wilson set a new world speed record, flying the Gloster Meteor jet at an average speed of 606 miles per hour over Herne Bay, England.
- Mexico and South Africa ratified the United Nations Charter.
- Born: Waljinah, singer, in Surakarta, Central Java, Indonesia
- Died: Gus Edwards, 66, American songwriter and vaudevillian

== November 8, 1945 (Thursday) ==
- British commander E.C. Mansergh ordered all Indonesians to surrender their arms by 6 a.m. Saturday or face "all the naval, army and air forces under my command." That night President Sukarno of the unrecognized Indonesian Republic appealed to President Truman and Prime Minister Attlee to intervene in the conflict to prevent bloodshed.
- In Budapest, former Hungarian Prime Minister László Bárdossy was sentenced to death.
- Regular civic air traffic began between London and New York.
- Died: August von Mackensen, 95, German field marshal

== November 9, 1945 (Friday) ==
- Martial law ended in Bulgaria and demobilization began.
- Canada ratified the United Nations Charter.
- The martial art organization Moo Duk Kwan was founded by Hwang Kee in Korea.

== November 10, 1945 (Saturday) ==
- Indonesian republican troops counterattacked during the Battle of Surabaya. November 10 is annually celebrated as Heroes Day to commemorate the event.
- Five Germans were hanged for the murder of six American airmen in the Rüsselsheim massacre of August 26, 1944.
- The stage musical Are You with It? with music by Harry Revel and lyrics by Arnold B. Horwitt premiered at the New Century Theatre on Broadway.

== November 11, 1945 (Sunday) ==
- The Indochinese Communist Party voluntarily dissolved itself "in order to destroy all misunderstanding, domestic and foreign, which can hinder the liberation of our country."
- Born: Daniel Ortega, President of Nicaragua (1979-1990, 2007–present), in La Libertad, Chontales Department, Nicaragua.
- Died: Jerome Kern, 60, American composer of musical theatre and popular music

== November 12, 1945 (Monday) ==
- The government of the unrecognized Indonesian Republic asked the Soviet Union to intervene in the conflict on behalf of the Indonesians.
- Born: Michael Bishop, author, in Lincoln, Nebraska; Tracy Kidder, nonfiction author, in New York City; Neil Young, musician, in Toronto, Canada

== November 13, 1945 (Tuesday) ==
- The United States and Britain agreed to create a joint commission of inquiry to examine the question of European Jews and Palestine.
- Ethiopia and Panama ratified the United Nations Charter.
- The French Constituent Assembly unanimously elected Charles de Gaulle president of the Provisional Government.
- Born: Lawrence Andreasen, United States Olympic diver (d. 1990)

== November 14, 1945 (Wednesday) ==
- Riots broke out in Tel Aviv over the U.S.-British statement on Palestine, killing two and wounding 57.
- Bolivia ratified the United Nations Charter.
- The play State of the Union by Russel Crouse and Howard Lindsay premiered at the Hudson Theatre in New York City.

== November 15, 1945 (Thursday) ==
- Zoltán Tildy became Prime Minister of Hungary.
- Venezuela ratified the United Nations Charter.
- The Indonesian Marine Corps was created.
- Born: Anni-Frid Lyngstad, singer and member of the Swedish pop group ABBA, in Bjørkåsen, Ballangen Municipality, Norway

== November 16, 1945 (Friday) ==
- UNESCO was founded.
- Azerbaijan People's Government: the communist Azerbaijani Democratic Party began an uprising in Iranian Azerbaijan Province.
- The drama film The Lost Weekend starring Ray Milland and Jane Wyman was released.
- The animated short film The Friendly Ghost marking the first screen appearance of the character Casper the Friendly Ghost was released.
- Died: Sigurður Eggerz, 70, two-time prime minister of Iceland

== November 17, 1945 (Saturday) ==
- Charles de Gaulle made a broadcast to the people of France announcing that he was handing back his mandate as president to the French Assembly because of "excessive demands regarding ministerial posts." De Gaulle said he was willing to continue serving as president but would refuse to entrust a Communist with "any post related to foreign affairs."
- Sentencing was handed down in the Belsen Trial. Josef Kramer, Irma Grese and nine others were sentenced to death on the gallows as Nazi war criminals.
- "It's Been a Long, Long Time" by Harry James hit #1 on the Billboard singles charts.

== November 18, 1945 (Sunday) ==
- Parliamentary elections were held in Bulgaria. The Bulgarian Agrarian National Union and the Bulgarian Communist Party both won 94 seats.
- The Portuguese legislative election was held. The National Union won all 120 seats uncontested when the opposition Movement of Democratic Unity boycotted the election, alleging electoral fraud.
- Born: Wilma Mankiller, Principal Chief of the Cherokee Nation, in Tahlequah, Oklahoma (d. 2010); Mahinda Rajapaksa, 6th President of Sri Lanka, in Weerakatiya, Southern Province, British Ceylon

== November 19, 1945 (Monday) ==
- The French Assembly voted 400 to 163 to reject Charles de Gaulle's resignation as President of France. De Gaulle then accepted the new mandate.
- General MacArthur ordered the arrest of 11 Japanese wartime leaders, including ex-Foreign Minister Yōsuke Matsuoka and General Sadao Araki.

== November 20, 1945 (Tuesday) ==
- The Nuremberg trials began.
- The Battle of Surabaya ended in tactical British victory but strategic and political Indonesian victory.
- Born: Rick Monday, baseball player, in Batesville, Arkansas
- Died: Francis William Aston, 68, English chemist, physicist and Nobel laureate

== November 21, 1945 (Wednesday) ==
- The United Auto Workers strike began. 320,000 workers went on strike nationwide against General Motors Corporation for a 30 percent increase in wages and a hold on product prices.
- Guatemala ratified the United Nations Charter.
- Born: Goldie Hawn, actress, in Washington, D.C.
- Died: Robert Benchley, 56, American humorist and film actor; Ellen Glasgow, 72, American novelist; Alexander Patch, 55, American general (pneumonia)

== November 22, 1945 (Thursday) ==
- British Conservative Deputy Leader Anthony Eden told the House of Commons that the first duty of the United Nations should be to "take the sting out of nationalism." Eden also said that "the United Nations ought to review their Charter in the light of the discoveries about atomic energy which were not before us when the Charter was drawn up. Nothing showed more clearly the hold that nationalism has upon us all than the decision of that Conference to retain the power of veto. Surely in the light of what has passed since San Francisco, the United Nations ought to look at that again, and, having looked at it, I hope they will unanimously decide that the retention of such a provision in the Charter is an anachronism in the modern world."
- The famous Hollywood Canteen, which catered to Allied servicemen and women during the war, shut its doors.

== November 23, 1945 (Friday) ==
- British police fired on anti-British rioters in Calcutta, killing 37.
- U.S. Agriculture Secretary Clinton P. Anderson announced the end of all food rationing, with the exception of sugar, effective at midnight.
- Born: Jerry Harris, sculptor, collagist and writer, in Pittsburgh, Pennsylvania (d. 2016); Dennis Nilsen, serial killer in Fraserburgh, Aberdeenshire, Scotland (d. 2018)
- Died: Charles Armijo Woodruff, 61, U.S. Navy officer and 11th Governor of American Samoa

== November 24, 1945 (Saturday) ==
- 26 people were injured in Bombay during another day of rioting in India.
- Born: Nuruddin Farah, novelist, in Baidoa, Somalia

== November 25, 1945 (Sunday) ==
- Elections to the Austrian National Council were held. The Austrian People's Party led by Leopold Figl won a majority.
- General Douglas MacArthur ordered the Japanese government to submit a program to tax away all the wartime profits of Japanese firms and individuals.
- Zionist terrorists blew up two coast guard stations near Tel Aviv. The attack was believed to have been made in retaliation for the seizure of the Greek schooner Dimitrius off the Palestine coast with 20 illegal Jewish immigrants.
- Died: Doris Keane, 63, American actress

== November 26, 1945 (Monday) ==
- 10,000 British troops swept into the Sharon plain and forced their way into the kibbutzim of Shefayim and Givat Haim with clubs and tear gas bombs searching for the terrorists in the previous day's attack. They encountered some opposition and killed nine Jews and wounded 75.
- U.S. Attorney General Tom C. Clark said that Ezra Pound had been indicted for a second time on 19 counts of treason for accepting payment from Fascist Italy in exchange for making propaganda broadcasts during the war.
- Born: Daniel Davis, actor, in Gurdon, Arkansas; John McVie, bass guitarist (John Mayall & the Bluesbreakers, Fleetwood Mac), in Ealing, London, England

== November 27, 1945 (Tuesday) ==
- The Slinky, a coiled spring that would become one of the world's most popular toys, went on sale for the first time as mechanical engineer Richard James and his wife Betty were able to demonstrate Richard's invention at the Gimbels department store in Philadelphia. Within 90 minutes, the Jameses had sold their supply of 400 of the toys, and 22,000 would be sold by the end of the 1945 holiday season.
- Patrick J. Hurley resigned as U.S. Ambassador to China and criticized professional and career diplomats, who he claimed were sabotaging American foreign policy. President Truman appointed General George C. Marshall to replace him.
- Norway ratified the United Nations Charter.
- Born:
  - Barbara Anderson, actress, in Brooklyn, New York
  - James Avery, actor, in Pughsville, Virginia (d. 2013)
  - Eduardo Héctor Garat, Argentine lawyer, professor and activist, in Rosario, Santa Fe, Argentina (kidnapped and murdered, 1978)

== November 28, 1945 (Wednesday) ==
- The Balochistan earthquake shook British India. Casualties have been estimated from 300 to as many as 4,000.
- British fascist John Amery surprised the nation when he pleaded guilty to high treason for making broadcasts for the Nazis, even though British law did not allow any sentence for the crime other than death. His entire hearing lasted eight minutes.
- Dynamo Moscow played the final game of its UK goodwill tour, earning a 2–2 draw against Rangers before 90,000 fans at Ibrox to finish the tour with two wins, no losses and two draws. Dynamo returned to Moscow as heroes, having proven that Britain was no longer the dominant football power.
- Died: Dwight F. Davis, 66, American tennis player and politician

== November 29, 1945 (Thursday) ==
- The Federal People's Republic of Yugoslavia was proclaimed.

== November 30, 1945 (Friday) ==
- Rudolf Hess dramatically told the tribunal at Nuremberg that he had faked amnesia, fooling Allied medical experts and his own attorney, but that he was now prepared to stand trial and "bear full responsibility for everything I have done."
- Born: Roger Glover, bassist, songwriter and record producer (Deep Purple), in Brecon, Wales; Mary Millington, model and pornographic actress, in Kenton, Middlesex, England (d. 1979)
- Died: Heinz-Wilhelm Eck, 29, German U-boat commander (executed as a war criminal for ordering his crew to shoot the survivors of the Greek merchant ship Peleus in March 1944)
