= United Nations Security Council Resolution 1 =

United Nations Security Council resolution

UN Security Council Resolution 1
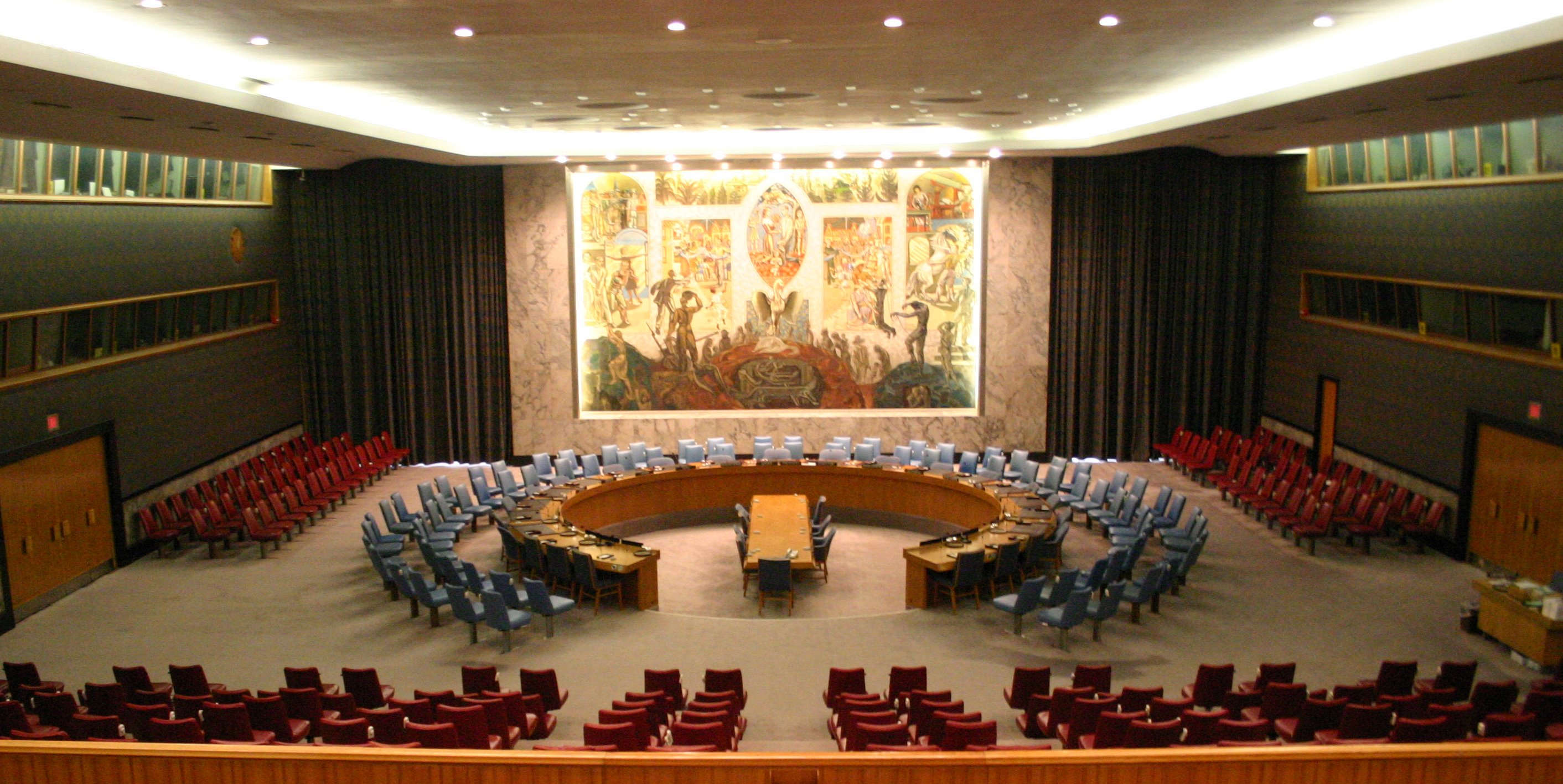
- The Security Council
- Date: 25 January 1946
- Meeting no.: 2
- Code: S/RES/1 (Document)
- Subject: Establishment of a Military Staff Committee
- Result: Adopted without vote

Security Council composition
- Permanent members: China; France; Soviet Union; United Kingdom; United States
- Non-permanent members: Australia; Brazil; Egypt; Mexico; Netherlands; Poland

United Nations Security Council Resolution 1 was adopted without a vote on 25 January 1946. The Council called for the Military Staff Committee (MSC) to organize for the first time in London on 1 February 1946.

== Background ==
The MSC was formed under Article 47 of the Charter of the United Nations and comprises the chiefs of staff from the military organizations of each of the Council's permanent members.
