= United Nations Participation Act =

United Nations Participation Act of 1945
- Long title: An Act to provide for the appointment of representatives of the United States in the organs and agencies of the United Nations, and to make other provision with respect to the participation of the United States in such organization.
- Enacted by: the 79th United States Congress

Citations
- Public law: Pub. L. 79–264
- Statutes at Large: 59 Stat. 619

Legislative history
- Introduced in the Senate as S. 1580; Signed into law by President Harry S. Truman on December 20, 1945

The United Nations Participation Act of 1945 was a law passed by the United States Congress in 1945, dealing with the process of United States joining the newly created United Nations and related bodies of the United Nations. This act provides the basic authority for U.S. participation as a member of the United Nations Organization. In particular, it is the authority for the president to apply economic and other sanctions against a target country or its nationals pursuant to mandatory decisions by the United Nations Security Council under Article 41 of the United Nations Charter.

Section 6. The President is authorized to negotiate a special agreement or agreements with the Security Council which shall be subject to the approval of the Congress by appropriate Act or joint resolution providing for the numbers and types of armed forces, their degree of readiness and general location, and the nature of facilities and assistance, including rights of passage, to be made available to the Security Council on its call for the purpose of maintaining international peace and security in accordance with article 43 of said Charter. The President shall not be deemed to require the authorization of the Congress to make available to the Security Council on its call in order to take action under article 42 of said Charter and pursuant to such special agreement or agreements the armed forces, facilities, or assistance provided for therein: Provided, That nothing herein contained shall be construed as an authorization to the President by the Congress to make available to the Security Council for such purpose armed forces, facilities, or assistance in addition to the forces, facilities, and assistance provided for in such special agreement or agreements.
