= August 1945 =

Month of 1945

<<	August 1945					>>
Su	Mo	Tu	We	Th	Fr	Sa
			1	2	3	4
5	6	7	8	9	10	11
12	13	14	15	16	17	18
19	20	21	22	23	24	25
26	27	28	29	30	31

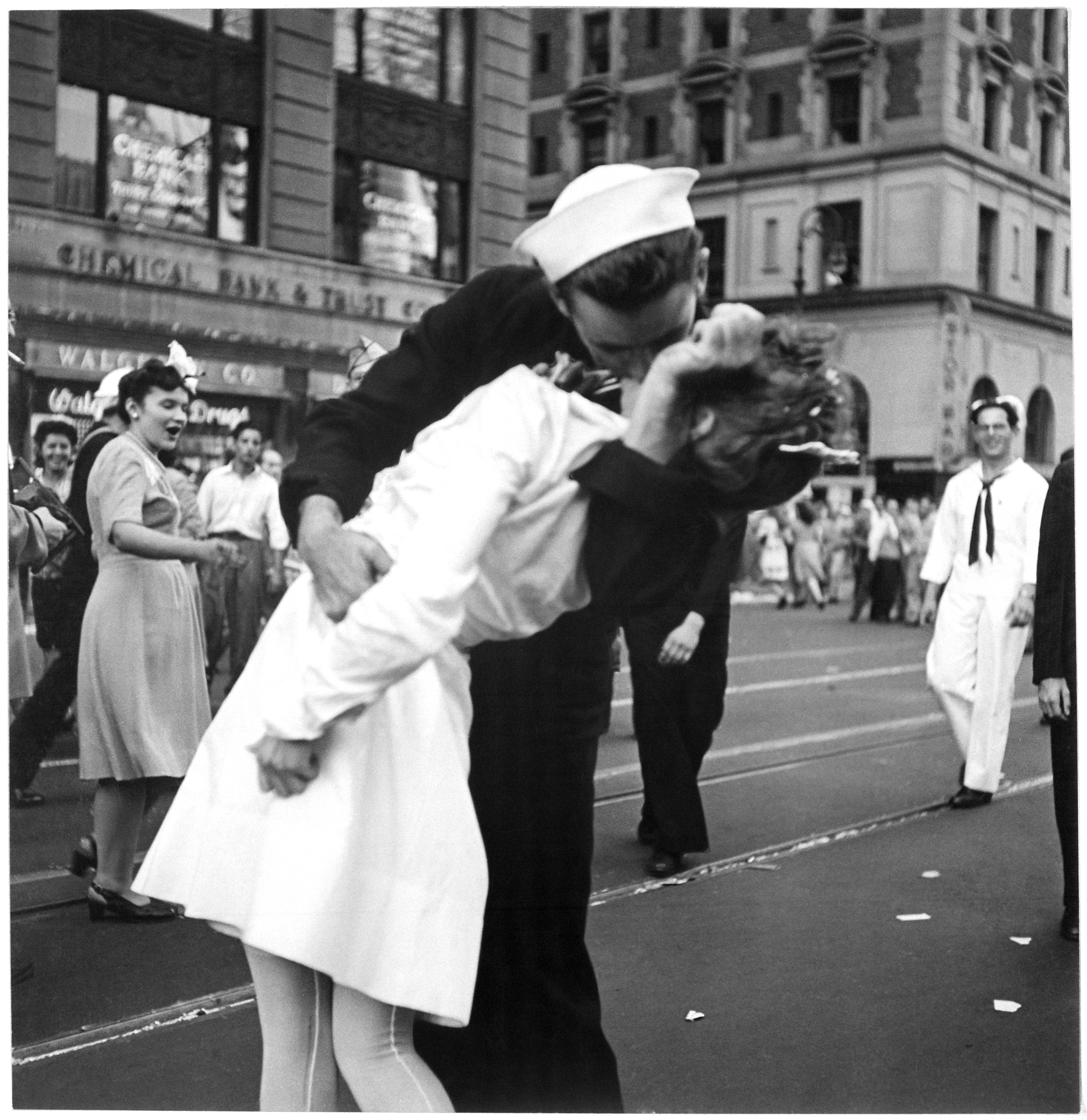
August 14, 1945: Kissing the War Goodbye: An alternate angle of a moment which would be differently interpreted over the years

The following events occurred in August 1945:

== August 1, 1945 (Wednesday) ==
- Pierre Laval was brought to Paris to face trial.
- Britain's new parliament with a Labour majority assembled for the first time to elect a new Speaker of the House of Commons. As Winston Churchill entered the House for the first time as an ex-prime minister, he was greeted by cheers and singing of "For He's a Jolly Good Fellow", to which members of the Labour Party responded by singing "The Red Flag". When Douglas Clifton Brown was re-elected Speaker he said he was not quite sure whether he was becoming chairman of the House of Commons or director of a musical show.
- Mel Ott of the New York Giants became the third member of the 500 home run club with a shot off Johnny Hutchings of the Boston Braves.
- Born: Douglas Osheroff, physicist and Nobel laureate, in Aberdeen, Washington

== August 2, 1945 (Thursday) ==
- In the heaviest raid of the war, 800 B-29s dropped more than 6,000 tons of incendiary bombs on Japanese cities and killed 80,000 people.
- Paul Tibbets, pilot of the lead plane in the planned atomic bomb run, reported to General Curtis LeMay's Air Force headquarters on Guam and was briefed on the Hiroshima mission.
- The Potsdam Conference concluded.
- Born: Joanna Cassidy, actress, in Haddonfield, New Jersey
- Died: Pietro Mascagni, 81, Italian composer

== August 3, 1945 (Friday) ==
- The American government announced that every Japanese and Korean harbor of consequence had been mined, leaving Japan totally blockaded.
- All Germans and Hungarians in Czechoslovakia were deprived of citizenship.

== August 4, 1945 (Saturday) ==
- The Soviets gifted a plaque to the U.S. Ambassador to Moscow that was secretly bugged with The Thing, one of the earliest covert listening devices ever invented. It would hang in the Spaso House for seven years until its secret was discovered.
- Paul Tibbets briefed his crewmates on the bombing mission to Hiroshima, saying the bombs would be immensely powerful and "something new in the history of warfare", but giving no specifics.
- Born: Paul McCarthy, performance artist and sculptor, in Salt Lake City, Utah; Alan Mulally, CEO of the Ford Motor Company from 2006 to 2014, in Oakland, California

== August 5, 1945 (Sunday) ==
- The U.S. Twentieth Air Force flew over twelve Japanese cities and dropped 720,000 pamphlets warning their populations to surrender or face devastation.
- Paul Tibbets formally named the lead plane in the Hiroshima bombing mission the Enola Gay, after his mother. The B-29 that would take photos on the mission would be named Necessary Evil.
- Born: Loni Anderson, actress, in Saint Paul, Minnesota (d.2025).

== August 6, 1945 (Monday) ==
- Atomic bombing of Hiroshima: United States B-29 Superfortress Enola Gay dropped a uranium-235 atomic bomb codenamed "Little Boy" on the Japanese city of Hiroshima at 8:15 a.m. local time, resulting in between 90,000 and 146,000 deaths in the short term.
- In a routine release to the White House press corps of a little over 1,000 words in length, a statement from U.S. President Harry S. Truman informed the media that an atomic bomb with "more power than 20,000 tons of TNT" had been dropped on Hiroshima. The statement made no mention of radiation effects and the notion of an atomic bomb simply being a bigger version of a regular bomb persisted in the press for days afterward.
- Died: Richard Bong, 24, United States Army major and highest-scoring air ace of WWII (killed in the crash of a test flight of an experimental aircraft); Hiram Johnson, 78, U.S. Senator from California

== August 7, 1945 (Tuesday) ==
- Radio Tokyo reported unspecifically about an attack on Hiroshima. The Americans were unable to immediately assess the results for themselves because of impenetrable cloud over the detonation site. Late in the day, Imperial Japanese headquarters referred to a "new type of bomb" used on Hiroshima, admitting that "only a small number of the new bombs were released, yet they did substantial damage."
- U.S. President Harry Truman announced the atomic bombing of Hiroshima while returning from the Potsdam Conference aboard the U.S. Navy heavy cruiser USS Augusta (CA-31), in the middle of the Atlantic Ocean.
- Josip Broz Tito refused to permit Peter II to return to Yugoslavia.
- The Nakajima Kikka made its first flight
- Born: Alan Page, jurist and Hall of Fame football player, in Canton, Ohio
- Died: Jacques Vaillant de Guélis, 38, British/French Special Operations Executive agent, in England from injuries received in automobile accident in Germany

== August 8, 1945 (Wednesday) ==
- Radio Tokyo gave its first full report on the Hiroshima bombing, concluding with the claim that the Americans had used methods which "have surpassed in hideous cruelty those of Genghis Khan."
- The Soviet Union declared itself to be in a state of war with Japan as of midnight August 9.
- The Nuremberg Charter was issued, setting down the laws and procedures by which the Nuremberg Trials were to be conducted.
- The United States ratified the United Nations Charter.
- The biographical war film Pride of the Marines starring John Garfield as U.S. Marine Al Schmid had a special world premiere in Schmid's home city of Philadelphia as part of "Al Schmid Day". More than 1,500 veterans of the Guadalcanal Campaign attended.
- Died: Joseph Pujol, Le Pétomane, 88, French flatulist

== August 9, 1945 (Thursday) ==
Excerpt of U.S President Harry Truman's speech regarding the nuclear attack on Hiroshima, Japan.

- Atomic bombing of Nagasaki: United States B-29 bomber Bockscar dropped a plutonium-239 atomic bomb codenamed "Fat Man" on the Japanese city of Nagasaki at 11:02 a.m. local time, resulting in between 39,000 and 80,000 deaths in the short term.
- The Soviet–Japanese War began with the invasion of Manchukuo.
- Mongolia declared war on Japan.
- The Michigan train wreck killed 34 people at Michigan City, North Dakota.
- Born: Tom O'Carroll, paedophilia advocate, in Warwickshire, England; Posy Simmonds, newspaper cartoonist and children's illustrator, in Berkshire, England
- Died: Harry Hillman, 63, American athlete and winner of three gold medals at the 1904 Summer Olympics; Jun Tosaka, 44, Japanese philosopher, in Nagano prison

== August 10, 1945 (Friday) ==
- The Japanese government announced that a message had been sent to the Allies accepting the terms of the Potsdam Declaration provided that it "does not comprise any demand that prejudices the prerogatives of the Emperor as sovereign ruler."
- The Chinese Civil War resumed with the beginning of the Opening Campaign.
- Died: Robert H. Goddard, 62, American engineer, physicist and inventor of the world's first liquid-fueled rocket

== August 11, 1945 (Saturday) ==
- The Soviet Invasion of South Sakhalin began when Soviet forces invaded the Japanese territorial portion of the island of Sakhalin.
- U.S. Secretary of State James F. Byrnes replied to Japan's offer with a refusal to compromise on the demand that the surrender be unconditional.
- The violent events referred to as the Kraków pogrom occurred in the Soviet-occupied city of Kraków, Poland.
- "On the Atchison, Topeka and the Santa Fe" by Johnny Mercer hit #1 on the Billboard singles charts.
- Died: Róża Berger, 56, only victim of the Kraków pogrom (shot by security forces)

== August 12, 1945 (Sunday) ==
- Soviet forces advanced onto the Korean Peninsula.
- The US government releases the Smyth Report, outlining the development of the atomic bomb, emphasizing the role of physics in its creation.
- Born: Ron Mael, American musician (Sparks), in Culver City, California
- Died: Karl Leisner, 30, German Roman Catholic priest, in a sanatorium at Planegg (Munich), of tuberculosis exacerbated by imprisonment in Dachau concentration camp

== August 13, 1945 (Monday) ==
- The Southern Jiangsu Campaign began as part of the Chinese Civil War.
- The World Zionist Congress demanded that 1 million Jews be admitted to Palestine.

== August 14, 1945 (Tuesday) ==
- Emperor Hirohito accepted the terms of the Potsdam Declaration and recorded a radio message to the Japanese people saying that the war should end and that they must "bear the unbearable." The recording was smuggled out of the Tokyo Imperial Palace. That night the Kyūjō incident occurred, an effort by a group of officers to steal the recording and stop the move to surrender. The attempt would fail and the conspirators would commit suicide. At 19:00 hrs in Washington, D.C. (23:00 GMT), U.S. President Harry S. Truman announced the Japanese surrender.
- The August Revolution began when the Viet Minh launched an uprising against French colonial rule in Vietnam.
- Alfred Eisenstaedt took the V-J Day in Times Square photograph of an American sailor kissing a woman in a white dress during V-J Day celebrations in New York City.
- Born: Steve Martin, comedian, actor, writer, producer and musician, in Waco, Texas; Wim Wenders, filmmaker, playwright, author and photographer, in Düsseldorf, Germany

== August 15, 1945 (Wednesday) ==
The Gyokuon-hōsō, the radio broadcast in which Hirohito read the Imperial Rescript on the Termination of the War, August 15, 1945

- Hirohito surrender broadcast (Gyokuon-hōsō): Emperor Hirohito's announcement of the unconditional surrender of Japan was broadcast on the radio a little after noon (12:00 Japan Standard Time is 03:00 GMT). This was probably the first time an Emperor of Japan had been heard by the common people. Delivered in formal classical Japanese, without directly referring to surrender and following official censorship of the country's weak position, the recorded speech was not immediately easily understood by ordinary people. The Allies called this day Victory over Japan Day (V-J Day). This ended the period of Japanese expansionism, and began the period of the Occupation of Japan and set the stage for Korean independence.
- Bombing of Kumagaya, Japan, by the United States using conventional bombs, beginning at 00:23.
- The Philippines Campaign ended in decisive Allied victory.
- The Battle of Baoying began in central Jiangsu, China as part of the Chinese Civil War.
- The British government revealed details of one of the biggest secrets of the war, radar.
- 89-year old Philippe Pétain was sentenced to death in Paris court for treason, but Charles de Gaulle gave him a reprieve on account of his age.
- The Provisional International Civil Aviation Organization was founded, as a specialized agency of the United Nations.
- Born: Miyuki Matsuhisa, Japanese artistic gymnast; Khaleda Zia, Bangladesh politician, Prime Minister of Bangladesh, in Jalpaiguri, Bengal
- Died: Korechika Anami, 58, Japanese general and War Minister (seppuku); Matome Ugaki, 55, Japanese admiral (killed attempting a final kamikaze mission)

== August 16, 1945 (Thursday) ==
- Emperor Hirohito issued a decree at 4:00 p.m. local time ordering all Japanese forces to cease fire. The Japanese cabinet resigned.
- Winston Churchill made a speech in the House of Commons referring to an "iron curtain" descending across Europe.
- The Battle of Yongjiazhen began as part of the Chinese Civil War.
- Died: Takijirō Ōnishi, 54, Japanese admiral (seppuku)

== August 17, 1945 (Friday) ==
- Indonesia declared its independence. The Indonesian National Revolution began afterwards.
- Prince Naruhiko Higashikuni became Prime Minister of Japan. He ordered the Imperial Army to obey the Emperor's call to lay down their arms.
- The Battle of Tianmen was fought as part of the Chinese Civil War, resulting in communist victory.
- George Orwell's allegorical and dystopian novella Animal Farm was published in England.

== August 18, 1945 (Saturday) ==
- Sukarno became 1st President of Indonesia.
- The Soviet Invasion of the Kuril Islands began, opening with the Battle of Shumshu.
- U.S. Army photographer Anthony J. Marchione became the last American to die in WWII when the B-32 he was flying in over Tokyo was damaged by enemy fire.
- Died: Netaji Subhas Chandra Bose, 48, Indian nationalist, in what is generally believed to be a plane crash in Formosa, although alternative theories persist.

== August 19, 1945 (Sunday) ==
- The Soviet assault on Maoka began.
- The Battle of Yongjiazhen ended in communist victory.
- Born: Ian Gillan, rock singer and songwriter (Deep Purple), in Chiswick, London, England
- Died: Tomás Burgos, 69, Chilean philanthropist

== August 20, 1945 (Monday) ==
- Vidkun Quisling went on trial in Oslo.
- British Foreign Secretary Ernest Bevin condemned Soviet policy in Eastern Europe as "one kind of totalitarianism replaced by another."

== August 21, 1945 (Tuesday) ==
- President Truman ordered that Lend-Lease aid be halted immediately.
- The first major Japanese surrender ceremony in China took place at the Zhijiang Airport in Hunan Province.
- Born: Raquel Zelaya, Guatemalan economist and politician

== August 22, 1945 (Wednesday) ==
- The Soviet assault on Maoka was completed.
- Soviet forces took Manchukuo's puppet ruler Puyi into custody.
- Born: Ron Dante, singer, songwriter and record producer, on Staten Island, New York

== August 23, 1945 (Thursday) ==
- The Battle of Shumshu ended in Soviet victory.
- The Battle of Baoying ended in communist victory.

== August 24, 1945 (Friday) ==
- The Battle of Wuhe was fought as part of the Chinese Civil War, resulting in communist victory.
- Matsue incident: Approximately 40 Japanese dissidents opposed to surrender attacked facilities in Matsue.
- British Prime Minister Clement Attlee told Parliament that Britain was in "a very serious financial position" due to the abrupt ending of Lend-Lease and that "the initial deficit with which we start the task of re-establishing our own economy and of contracting our overseas commitments is immense."
- Born: Vince McMahon, professional wrestling promoter, announcer and CEO of WWE, in Pinehurst, North Carolina

== August 25, 1945 (Saturday) ==
- The Invasion of South Sakhalin ended in Soviet victory.
- Spruille Braden was appointed Assistant Secretary of State for American Republic Affairs after Nelson Rockefeller resigned.
- The Bảo Đại Emperor abdicated as a result of the August Revolution ending the Empire of Vietnam after 2,000 years.
- Died: Willis Augustus Lee, 57, American admiral (heart attack)

== August 26, 1945 (Sunday) ==
- The Huaiyin–Huai'an Campaign and the Battle of Yinji began as part of the Chinese Civil War.
- Born: Tom Ridge, politician and 1st United States Secretary of Homeland Security, in Munhall, Pennsylvania
- Died: Franz Werfel, 54, Austrian-Bohemian novelist, playwright and poet

== August 27, 1945 (Monday) ==
- The Battle of Yinji ended in communist victory.
- The Texas hurricane made landfall near Seadrift, Texas. The storm resulted in three fatalities and $20 million in damage.
- Born: Marianne Sägebrecht, film actress, in Starnberg, Germany

== August 28, 1945 (Tuesday) ==
- The Allied occupation of Japan began.
- The Southern Jiangsu Campaign ended in communist victory.

== August 29, 1945 (Wednesday) ==
- The Xinghua Campaign began in China.
- The Rodgers and Hammerstein musical film State Fair starring Jeanne Crain, Dana Andrews and Dick Haymes was released.
- Died: Fritz Pfleumer, 64, German-Austrian engineer

== August 30, 1945 (Thursday) ==
- A British battle squadron led by the aircraft carrier Indomitable arrived at Hong Kong to reoccupy the colony.
- The Allied Control Council constituted itself in Germany.
- Douglas MacArthur landed in Japan and set up temporary headquarters in Yokohama.

== August 31, 1945 (Friday) ==
- Douglas MacArthur established the Supreme Allied Command in Tokyo.
- France ratified the United Nations Charter.
- The Liberal Party of Australia was founded to replace the United Australia Party.
- Born: Van Morrison, singer and songwriter, in Belfast, Northern Ireland; Itzhak Perlman, violinist and conductor, in Tel Aviv, Mandatory Palestine; Bob Welch, musician (Fleetwood Mac), in Los Angeles, California (d. 2012)
- Died: Stefan Banach, 53, Polish mathematician (lung cancer)
