= July 1945 =

Month of 1945

<<	July 1945					>>
Su	Mo	Tu	We	Th	Fr	Sa
1	2	3	4	5	6	7
8	9	10	11	12	13	14
15	16	17	18	19	20	21
22	23	24	25	26	27	28
29	30	31

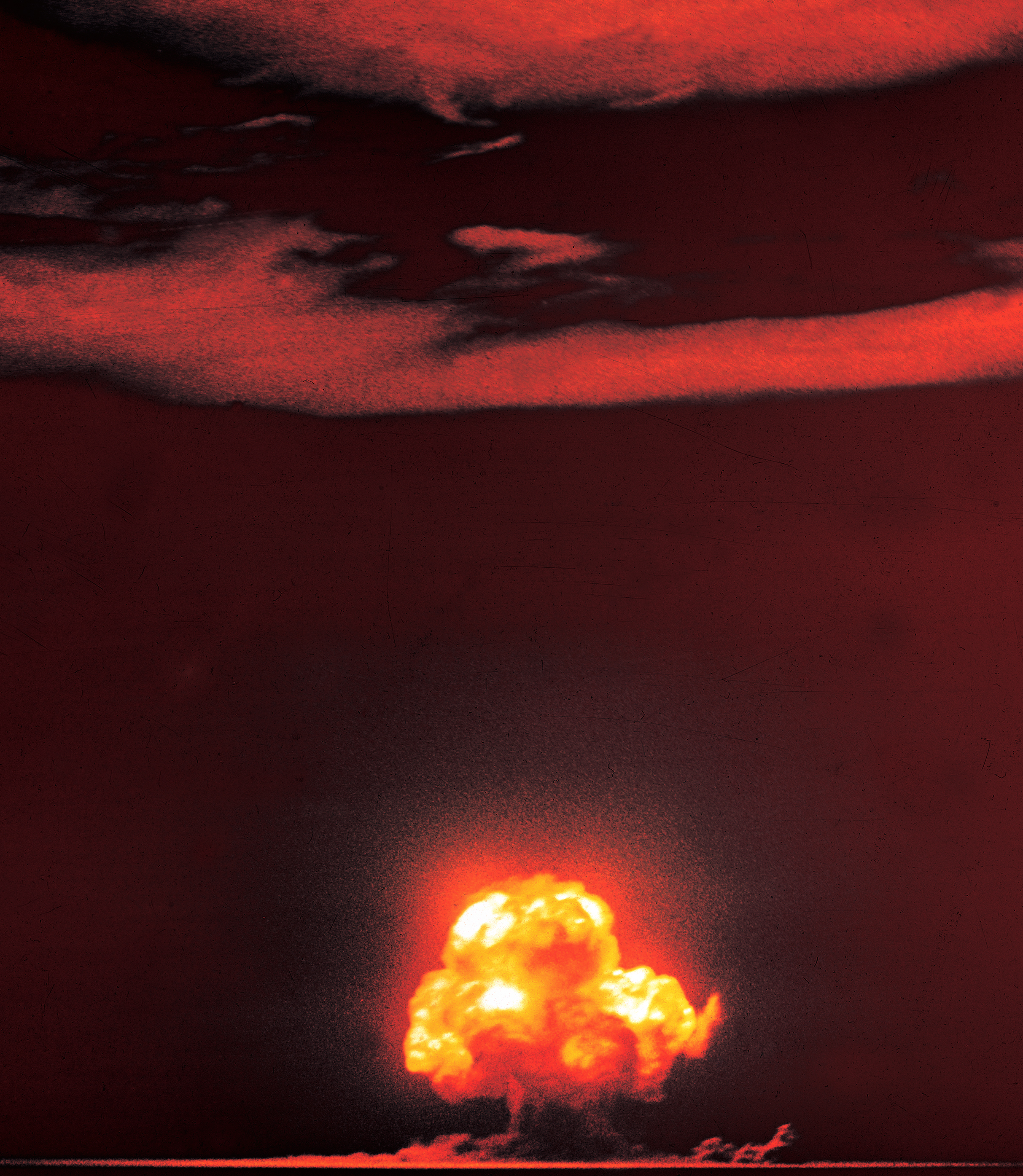
July 16, 1945: Trinity (nuclear test)

The following events occurred in July 1945:

== July 1, 1945 (Sunday) ==
- The Battle of Balikpapan began when Australian and Dutch troops made an amphibious landing a few miles north of Balikpapan, Borneo.
- The Inner German Border was established as the boundary between the Western and Soviet occupation zones of Germany.
- British troops withdrew from Magdeburg, now part of the Soviet occupation zone.
- A Lion is in the Streets by Adria Locke Langley topped the New York Times Fiction Best Sellers list.
- Born: Debbie Harry, singer-songwriter and actress (Blondie), in Miami, Florida
- Died: Willibald Borowietz, 51, German Generalleutnant (committed suicide by electrocution in a bathtub in the Camp Clinton, Mississippi POW camp)

== July 2, 1945 (Monday) ==
- Only 200,000 essential workers were left in Tokyo due to mass evacuations.
- The submarine USS Barb fired rockets on Kaihyo Island near Sakhalin, becoming the first American underwater craft to fire rockets in shore bombardment.
- The 1945 Sheikh Bashir Rebellion broke out in Burao and Erigavo in British Somaliland, led by Sheikh Bashir, a Somali religious leader.

== July 3, 1945 (Tuesday) ==
- Moscow radio announced that the body of Joseph Goebbels had been discovered in the courtyard of the Chancellery in Berlin.
- James F. Byrnes became United States Secretary of State.
- The first civilian passenger car made in the United States in three years rolled off the assembly line of the Ford Motor Company in Detroit.

== July 4, 1945 (Wednesday) ==
- About 500 Canadian troops rioted in Aldershot, England, in protest about the delay in sending them home.
- The Auxiliary Flight Research Station (AFRS) on Wallops Island, Virginia, launched its first test vehicle, a small two-stage, solid-fuel rocket to check out the installation's instrumentation.

== July 5, 1945 (Thursday) ==
- General Douglas MacArthur announced that the Philippines had been completely liberated.
- The United Kingdom general election was held. The results would not be announced until July 26 to allow time for the votes of troops serving overseas to be counted.
- Frank Forde became Prime Minister of Australia when the incumbent John Curtin died in office. Forde would serve for one week, making him the shortest-serving prime minister in Australian history.
- The Polish Provisional Government of National Unity was recognized by Britain and the United States.
- Died: John Curtin, 60, 14th prime minister of Australia

== July 6, 1945 (Friday) ==
- General Lewis Lyne took the salute during the first Allied forces victory parade in Berlin.
- Norway announced that it had declared war on Japan on December 7, 1941.
- Frank Forde became 15th Prime Minister of Australia one day after John Curtin's death in office.
- Michael I of Romania was awarded the Order of Victory, the Soviet Union's highest and rarest military decoration.
- Born: Burt Ward, television actor and activist, in Los Angeles, California.

== July 7, 1945 (Saturday) ==
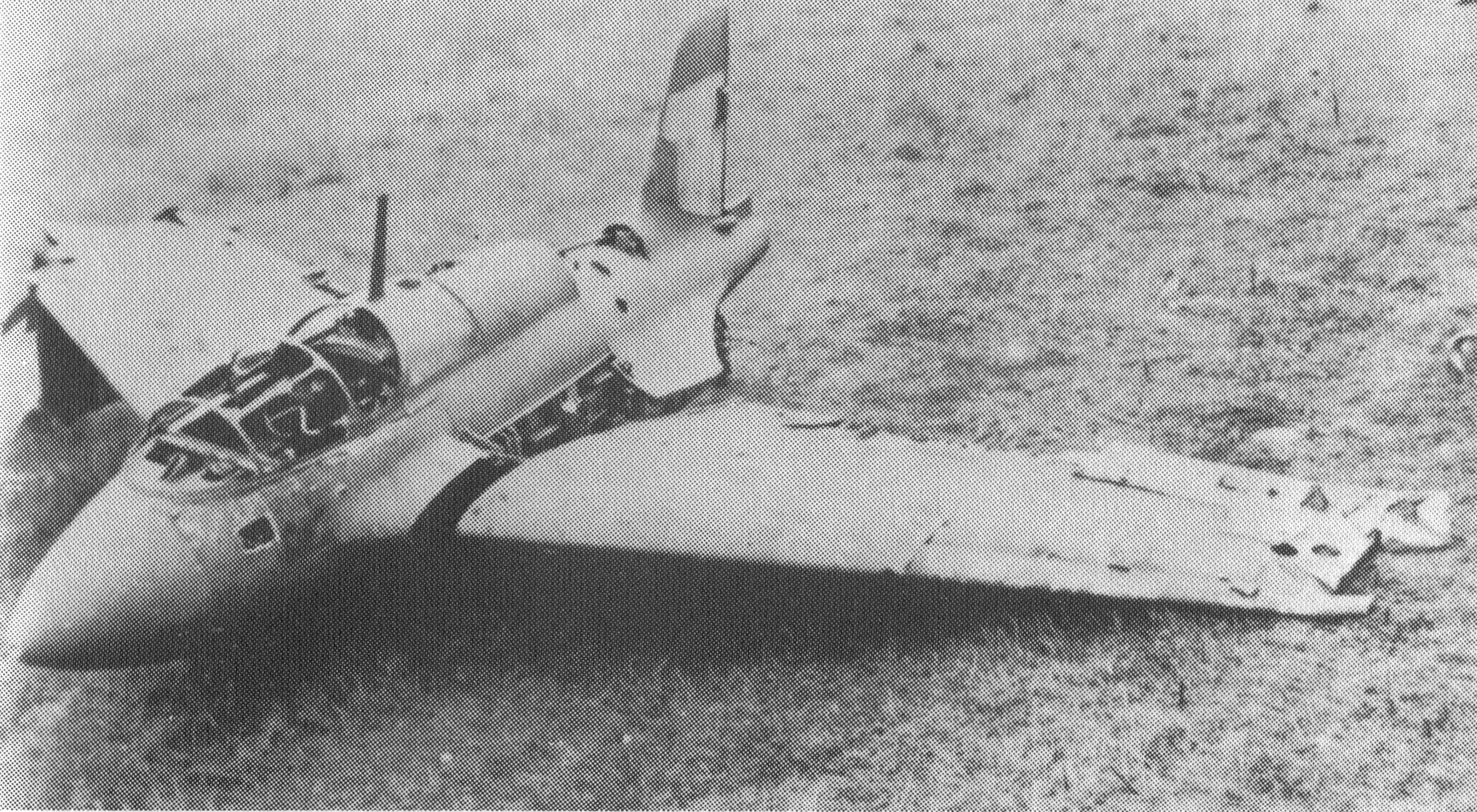
Mitsubishi J8M

- The Mitsubishi J8M, a Japanese rocket-powered aircraft copied from the Messerschmitt Me 163 Komet interceptor, made its first flight.
- Japanese soldiers in Burma carried out the Kalagong massacre, killing an estimated 600 villagers after they failed to provide any information under questioning about guerrillas in the area.
- Born: Michael Ancram, politician, in London, England; Heloísa Pinheiro, the source of inspiration for the song "The Girl from Ipanema"; Matti Salminen, operatic bass singer, in Turku, Finland

== July 8, 1945 (Sunday) ==
- The Utah prisoner of war massacre occurred just after midnight when an American soldier killed nine German prisoners of war and wounded twenty others at a camp in Salina, Utah.
- Australian troops landed at Penajam, Borneo.
- Born: Micheline Calmy-Rey, politician, in Sion, Switzerland

== July 9, 1945 (Monday) ==
- An estimated crowd of 30,000 lined the streets in Perth, Australia for the funeral procession of the late prime minister John Curtin.
- Charles de Gaulle proposed a national referendum to decide the system of government in France.
- Born: Dean Koontz, author, in Everett, Pennsylvania

== July 10, 1945 (Tuesday) ==
- Soviet forces and Polish communists began the Augustów roundup targeting the "cursed soldiers", anti-communist partisans and sympathizers.
- The Louvre reopened in Paris.
- Born: Ron Glass, actor, in Evansville, Indiana (d. 2016)

== July 11, 1945 (Wednesday) ==
- The Soviet Union agreed to hand over civilian and military control of West Berlin to British and U.S. forces.
- The Japanese destroyer Sakura struck a mine and sank in Osaka Harbor.
- Fadil Hoxha became President of the Assembly of Kosovo and Metohija.
- The musical revue Sigh No More by Noël Coward opened at the Manchester Opera House.
- Born: Richard Wesley, playwright and screenwriter, in Newark, New Jersey

== July 12, 1945 (Thursday) ==
- The British Army honored the Soviet military in a ceremony under the Brandenburg Gate in Berlin. Acting as a representative of King George VI, Field Marshal Bernard Montgomery awarded Georgy Zhukov with the Grand Cross of the Order of the Bath. Konstantin Rokossovsky was made a Knight Commander of the Order of the Bath while Vasily Sokolovsky and Mikhail Malinin were made Knights Commanders of the Order of the British Empire.
- Ben Chifley was elected Prime Minister of Australia on first ballot by the Labor Party. He took office the following day.
- Died: Wolfram Freiherr von Richthofen, 49, German field marshal (died in American captivity of a brain tumor)

== July 13, 1945 (Friday) ==
- The Berlin municipal council officially confiscated all property held by members of the Nazi Party.
- The American government admitted responsibility for the April 1 sinking of the Japanese hospital ship Awa Maru, claiming it was an error.
- Died: Alla Nazimova, 66, Russian actress (coronary thrombosis)

== July 14, 1945 (Saturday) ==
- Italy declared war on Japan effective the next day.
- Japanese destroyer Tachibana was bombed and sunk in Hakodate Bay by U.S. Navy aircraft.
- The Simla Conference on the future of Indian government ended in failure.
- The ban on Allied troops fraternizing with German women was lifted.

== July 15, 1945 (Sunday) ==
- Blackout restrictions for the West End of London were lifted.
- American vessels bombarded Muroran, the second-biggest steel center in Japan.
- Byron Nelson won the PGA Championship.
- Born: Jürgen Möllemann, politician, in Augsburg, Germany (d. 2003)

== July 16, 1945 (Monday) ==
- Trinity: As part of the Manhattan Project, the United States Army conducted the first detonation of a nuclear weapon in the Jornada del Muerto desert in New Mexico.
- Japanese submarine I-13 was possibly sunk in the Pacific Ocean on this date by the American destroyer escort Lawrence C. Taylor and aircraft from the escort carrier Anzio.
- Born: Victor Sloan, photographer and artist, in Dungannon, Northern Ireland
- Died: Addison Randall, 39, American film actor

== July 17, 1945 (Tuesday) ==
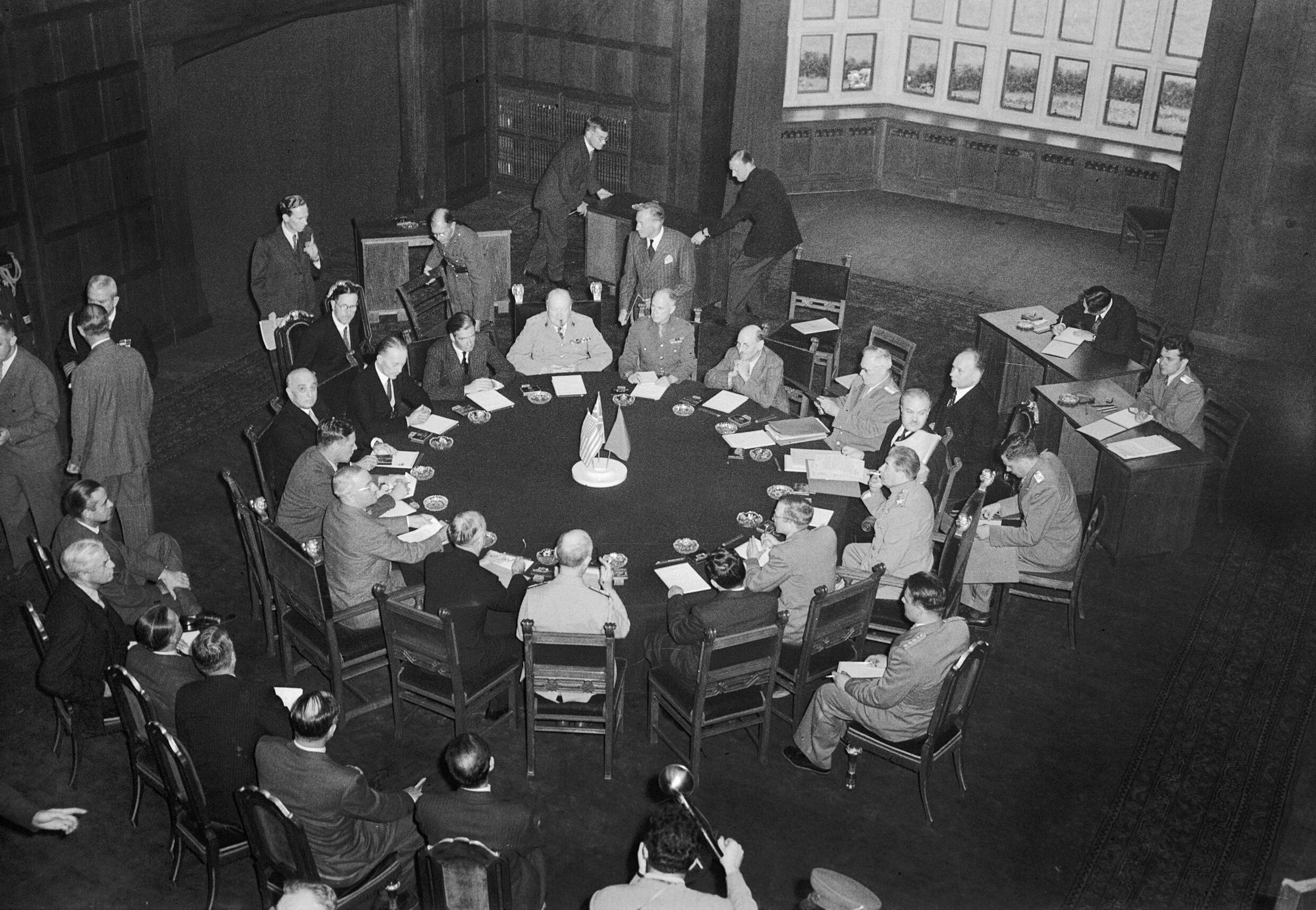
Beginning of the Potsdam Conference

- The Potsdam Conference began in Potsdam, occupied Germany. Representatives of the Soviet Union, the United Kingdom and the United States met to discuss how to administer postwar Germany.
- Born: Alexander, Crown Prince of Yugoslavia, in London, England
- Died: Ernst Busch, 60, German field marshal

== July 18, 1945 (Wednesday) ==
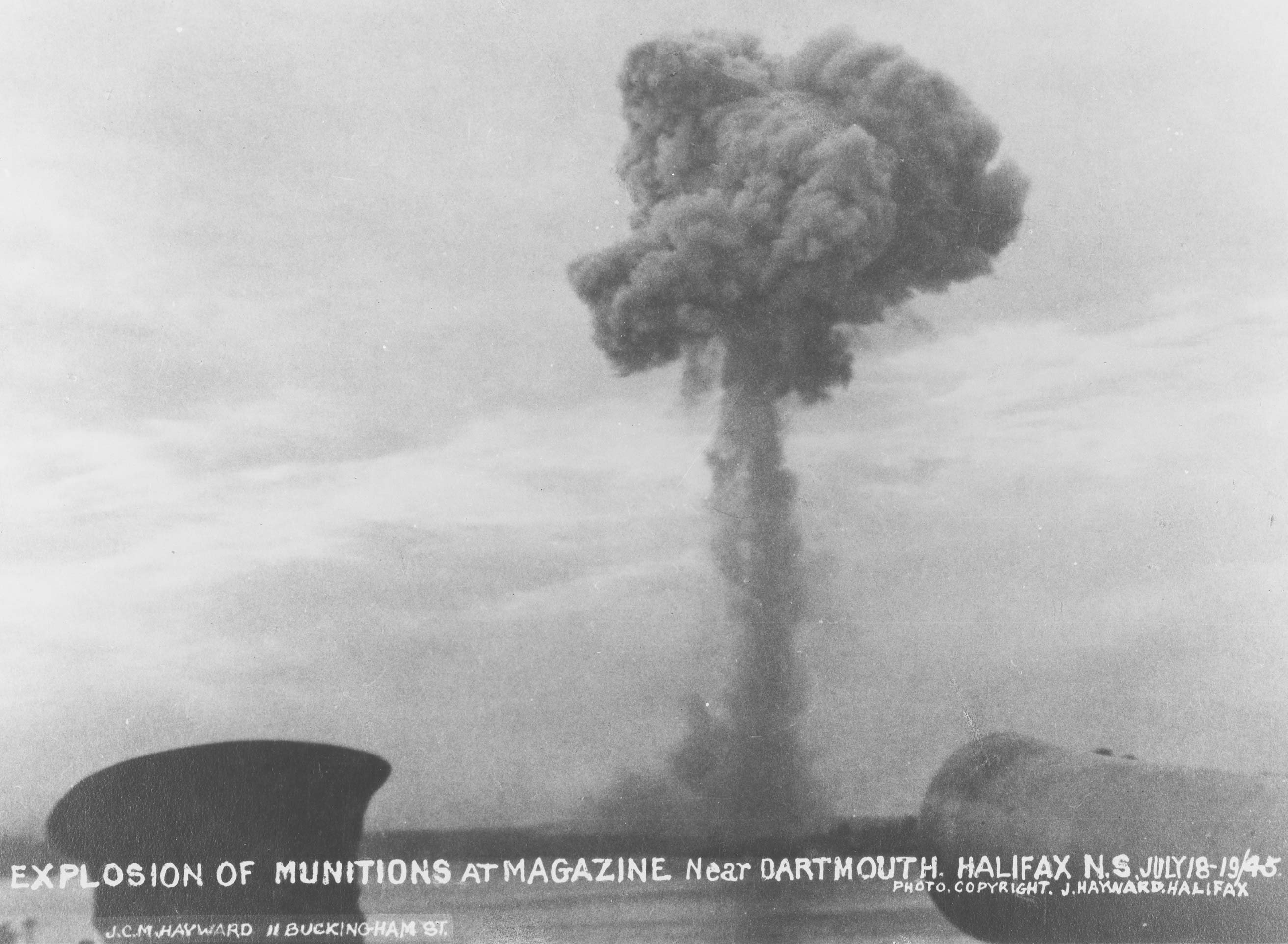
Blast cloud from Bedford Magazine explosion

- A fire broke out in Bedford, Nova Scotia, Canada, that spread to a dock where ammunition was temporarily being stored, creating a chain reaction of fires and explosions that continued for more than 24 hours.
- The Belgian senate voted to forbid the return of Leopold III.

== July 19, 1945 (Thursday) ==
- The United States Senate ratified the Bretton Woods system of monetary management, which would lead to the establishment of the International Monetary Fund and the International Bank for Reconstruction and Development.
- The musical film Anchors Aweigh starring Frank Sinatra, Kathryn Grayson and Gene Kelly premiered in New York City.

== July 20, 1945 (Friday) ==
- Belgian Prime Minister Achille Van Acker asked Leopold III to abdicate for his "grave and unpardonable mistakes."
- Born: Kim Carnes, singer-songwriter, in Los Angeles, California; Larry Craig, politician, in Council, Idaho
- Died: Paul Valéry, 73, French poet and philosopher

== July 21, 1945 (Saturday) ==
- The Battle of Balikpapan ended in Allied victory.
- A U.S. Navy captain in the Office of War Information broadcast in Japanese an unauthorized talk in which he stated that American patience was "rapidly running out" and told Japan to surrender unconditionally or face "virtual destruction".
- Born: John Lowe, professional darts player, in New Tupton, Derbyshire, England

== July 22, 1945 (Sunday) ==
- American, British and Russian officials agreed to allow their respective military police forces to move freely throughout all occupation zones of Berlin to thwart the city's runaway black market trade.
- Art treasures worth an estimated $500 million U.S. that had been looted by the Germans during the war were returned to two galleries in Florence, Italy.

== July 23, 1945 (Monday) ==
- The trial of Philippe Pétain opened in Paris.
- Died: George Lambton, 84, British thoroughbred racehorse trainer

== July 24, 1945 (Tuesday) ==
- The United States Third Fleet began the bombing of Kure. Japanese aircraft carrier Amagi was among the ships to take heavy damage.
- Harry S. Truman told Joseph Stalin that a new and powerful weapon was ready to be deployed against Japan, but did not provide any specific information.
- Born: Azim Premji, business tycoon, investor and philanthropist, in Bombay, British India

== July 25, 1945 (Wednesday) ==
- The Potsdam Conference adjourned temporarily so the British delegation could return to England to hear the election results.
- The U.S. government announced the end of all organized Japanese resistance on Mindanao.
- Japanese Patrol Boat No. 2 (former destroyer Nadakaze) was sunk by British submarine HMS Stubborn in the Java Sea.
- Philippe Pétain caused an uproar when he spoke for the first time during his trial, claiming that he was deaf and had not heard a thing that had been said in court up to that time. Many in the courtroom did not believe him, pointing out that he had frequently appeared to be listening attentively and fidgeted the most when serious charges were being made against him.

== July 26, 1945 (Thursday) ==
- The Potsdam Declaration was issued, outlining the Allied terms of surrender for the Empire of Japan.
- The results of the 1945 United Kingdom general election were announced: Clement Attlee's Labour Party won an unexpected landslide over Winston Churchill's Conservatives and Attlee took office as Prime Minister of the United Kingdom.
- British minesweeper Vestal was heavily damaged by a kamikaze attack. She would later be scuttled becoming the last Royal Navy ship sunk in World War II.
- Born: Helen Mirren, actress, in Hammersmith, London, England

== July 27, 1945 (Friday) ==
- On the island of Tinian in the Marianas chain, the Little Boy atomic bomb began being prepared for use.
- Japanese battleship Hyūga ran aground during the bombing of Kure and never returned to service.
- Chinese forces entered Guilin.
- Ernest Bevin became the new UK Foreign Affairs Secretary.

== July 28, 1945 (Saturday) ==
- 1945 Empire State Building B-25 crash: A B-25 Mitchell bomber crashed into the Empire State Building in New York City during a heavy fog, resulting in fourteen deaths.
- At a press conference, Japanese Prime Minister Kantarō Suzuki gave a response to the Potsdam Declaration that elicited confusion. The translation was unclear as to whether he refused to acknowledge the demand or wished to make no comment at that time.
- American B-29s carried out the bombing of Aomori.
- Japanese battleships Haruna and Ise and cruiser Ōyodo were sunk on the final day of the bombing of Kure.
- The American destroyer Callaghan was sunk by a Yokosuka K5Y kamikaze attack off Okinawa.
- The United States Senate ratified the Charter of the United Nations, signed a month earlier.
- Born: Jim Davis, cartoonist and creator of the Garfield comic strip, in Marion, Indiana
- Died: Margot Asquith, Countess of Oxford and Asquith, 81, British socialite, author and wit, widow of H. H. Asquith, Prime Minister of the United Kingdom, in London

== July 29, 1945 (Sunday) ==
- Henry Ford issued a statement that "the nation and the world are on the threshold of a prosperity and standard of living that never before were considered possible."
- The BBC Light Programme premiered.
- Born: Joe Beck, jazz guitarist, in Philadelphia, Pennsylvania (d. 2008)

== July 30, 1945 (Monday) ==
- In the last notable Japanese success of the war, the American cruiser USS Indianapolis was torpedoed and sunk in the Philippine Sea by the submarine I-58.
- The Battle of the Visayas in the Philippines ended in Allied victory.
- Born: Roger Dobkowitz, television producer, in San Francisco, California; Patrick Modiano, novelist and Nobel laureate, in Boulogne-Billancourt. France

== July 31, 1945 (Tuesday) ==
- On Tinian, the assembly of the Little Boy atomic bomb was completed.
- The Ústí massacre of ethnic Germans in the northern Bohemian city of Ústí nad Labem occurred.
- Pierre Laval was flown from Spain to Linz, Austria where he was handed over to French authorities.
- Died: Ludwig Müller, 63, German theologian and Nazi (suicide); Artemio Ricarte, 78, Filipino general
