= Opening Campaign =

Resumption of the Civil War in China after of the end of the World War II

- Part of World War II (until 2 September 1945) and the Chinese Civil War
Date	August 10, 1945 – January 10, 1946 (5 months)
Location	East China and Northeast China (Soviet occupation of Manchuria)
Result	Communists retreat to northeastern China, Partial Nationalist Victory Start of the Second Phase of the Chinese Civil War

Belligerents
Republic of China; United States	Chinese Communist Party; Soviet Union	Empire of Japan (August 1945)

Commanders and leaders
(Republic of China (1912–1949)) Chiang Kai-shek (Republic of China (1912–1949)) Bai Chongxi (Republic of China (1912–1949)) Li Zongren (Republic of China (1912–1949)) Yan Xishan	Mao Zedong; Zhou Enlai; Zhu De; Peng Dehuai (Soviet Union) Aleksandr Vasilevsky	(Empire of Japan) Otozō Yamada (Empire of Japan) Yasuji Okamura (Manchukuo) Puyi

Strength
110,000	100,000	600,000 (10–11 August) hundreds afterwards deserted

Casualties and losses
c. 45,000	Unknown	All killed, defected, deserted, or captured

The Opening Campaign was the start of second phase of the Chinese Civil War, beginning at the end of World War II with the surrender of Japan. After the war ended, the Second United Front had no more meaning, and it disbanded. The generals of the nationalist and communist causes scrapped for territory, beginning the second chapter of the bloody conflict.

== Campaign ==
Japan's defeat at the end of the Pacific War left a power vacuum across large parts of China, as the Kuomintang under Chiang Kai-shek and the Chinese Communist Party under Mao Zedong began to take over territories that were recently conquered by Japan. The end of World War II brought an end to the Japanese control over China and their puppet the Reorganized National Government of China's over Nanjing, but sporadic fighting between the Japanese and both Chinese political groups continued for a while. At the Battle of Tianmen on August 17, the communists destroyed a contingent of Japanese soldiers and Nationalist troops previously subservient to the rule of the Japanese occupiers. Some Japanese and many of the members of their puppet regimes actually joined the Nationalist Kuomintang Army, hoping to fight the Chinese Communists that, during the war, refused to make truces with the Japanese, while Chiang Kai-shek did so. But pretty soon, Nationalist forces moved in to capture the coastal cities of China, such as the cities of Shanghai and Guangzhou, while the communists managed to take Northeast China, which occupying Japanese forces previously organized under the puppet state of Manchukuo. As relations between the two opposing factions broke down, the Nationalist forces began to fight the communists and slowly push them northwards. Mao and his supporters lost over 45 percent of their fighting force in a few months, in between the Yetaishan Campaign and the beginning of the year of 1946, when the war began to become more serious. By then, the communists were pinned down in the northeast and the Nationalists controlled most of China.

== See also ==
- Outline of the Chinese Civil War
