= May 1945 =

Month of 1945

<<	May 1945					>>
Su	Mo	Tu	We	Th	Fr	Sa
		1	2	3	4	5
6	7	8	9	10	11	12
13	14	15	16	17	18	19
20	21	22	23	24	25	26
27	28	29	30	31

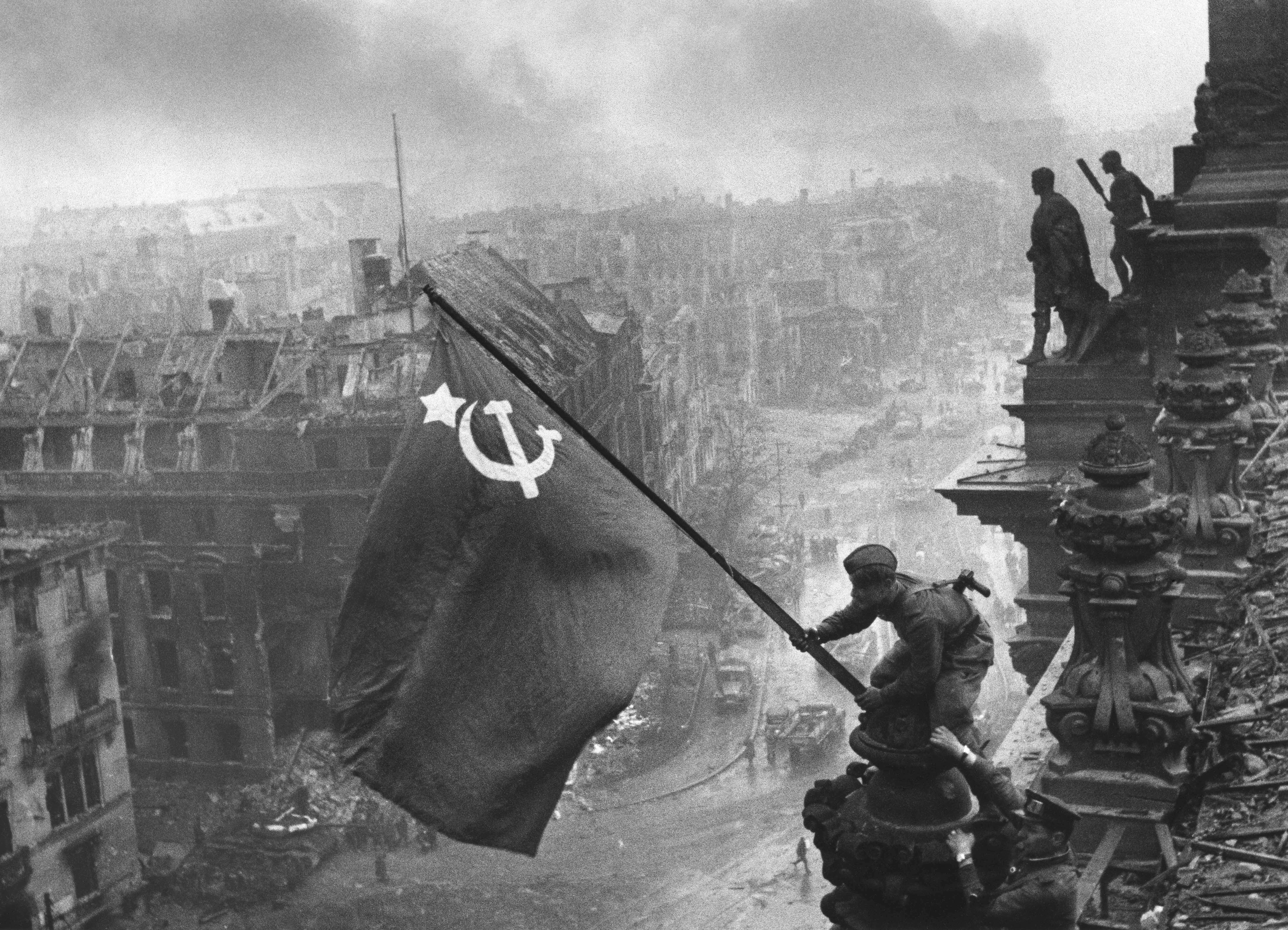
May 2, 1945: Raising a Flag over the Reichstag

The following events occurred in May 1945:

== May 1, 1945 (Tuesday) ==
- Reichssender Hamburg's Flensburg radio station announced that Adolf Hitler had fallen in Berlin while "fighting for Germany". President Karl Dönitz gave a broadcast that night declaring that it was his task to save the German people "from destruction by Bolshevists."
- Joseph Goebbels carried out his sole official act as Chancellor of Germany, dictating a letter to the Soviet commander in Berlin advising of Hitler's death and requesting a ceasefire. When the latter was refused, he and his wife Magda killed their six children and committed suicide themselves. Karl Dönitz appointed Lutz Graf Schwerin von Krosigk as the new de facto Chancellor of Germany, in the Flensburg Government.
- The U.S. Seventh Army reached Hitler's birthplace of Braunau am Inn, Austria.
- The Battle of Halbe ended in Soviet victory.
- Troops of the Yugoslav 4th Army, together with the Slovene 9th Corpus NOV, entered Trieste.
- An estimated 700–2,500 suicides took place in Demmin, after 80% of the German town had been destroyed by the Soviets during the previous three days.
- In the Pacific War, the Borneo campaign opened with the beginning of the Battle of Tarakan.
- Born: Rita Coolidge, American singer; in Lafayette, Tennessee
- Died: Joseph Goebbels, 47, German Nazi politician and Reich Minister of Propaganda (suicide); Magda Goebbels, 43, wife of Joseph Goebbels (suicide); the six Goebbels children, 4 through 12 (died by murder with cyanide)

== May 2, 1945 (Wednesday) ==
- The Battle of Berlin ended in decisive Soviet victory.
- A Holocaust death march from Dachau to the Austrian border was halted under 2 kilometres (1.2 mi) west of Waakirchen by the segregated, all-Nisei 522nd Field Artillery Battalion of the U.S. Army in southern Bavaria, saving several hundred prisoners.
- Yevgeny Khaldei took the iconic Raising a Flag over the Reichstag photograph, showing Soviet troops raising the flag of the Soviet Union atop the German Reichstag building in Berlin.
- Admiral Dönitz's Flensburg Government was formed, centered in the northern port of Flensburg.
- The Allied Spring offensive in Italy ended with the official surrender of German forces in Italy.
- Pierre Laval left Barcelona by air, forced back to Austria by General Charles de Gaulle who intervened with the Spanish. Laval was arrested by U.S. troops who turned him over to the Free French. He would be tried and executed in October 1945.
- Born: Bianca Jagger, social activist, born Blanca Pérez-Mora Macías in Managua, Nicaragua
- Died: Erich Bärenfänger, 30, German Generalmajor (suicide); Georg Betz, 41, German SS officer (killed trying to cross the Weidendammer Bridge in Berlin under heavy Soviet fire); Martin Bormann, 44, German Nazi official (probable suicide); Wilhelm Burgdorf, 50, German general (suicide by gunshot); Walther Hewel, 41, German diplomat (suicide); Peter Högl, 47, German SS-Obersturmbannführer (died of head wound sustained while crossing the Weidendammer Bridge); Hans Krebs, 47, German general (suicide by gunshot); Ewald Lindloff, 36, Waffen-SS officer (killed crossing the Weidendammer Bridge); Franz Schädle, 38, German commander of Hitler's personal bodyguard (suicide by pistol); Martin Strahammer, 54, German Generalmajor (shot by American forces near Parma, Italy); Joachim von Siegroth, 48, German Generalmajor (believed killed in action)

== May 3, 1945 (Thursday) ==
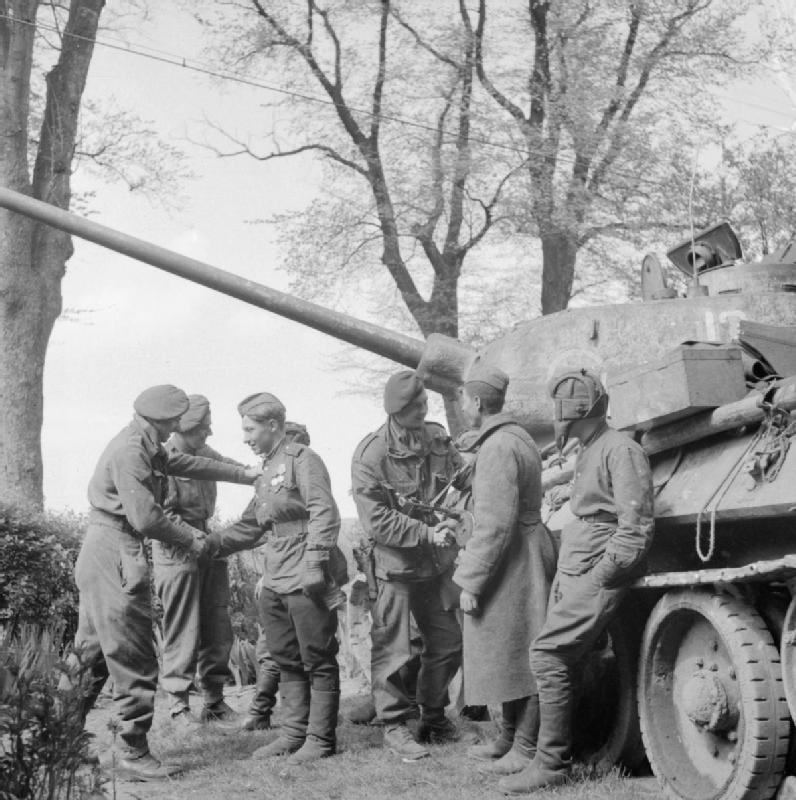
The British and Soviet forces near Wismar on the Baltic coast, 3 May 1945

- The German ocean liner Cap Arcona was sunk by British warplanes in the Bay of Lübeck with 5,000 concentration camp prisoners aboard. Over 400 SS personnel made it to lifeboats and were rescued but only 350 of the prisoners survived.
- Karl Dönitz arranged to send a surrender delegation to Bernard Montgomery's headquarters.
- The British Fourteenth Army captured Rangoon.
- The British Second Army occupied Hamburg unopposed.
- Irish Prime Minister Éamon de Valera offered his condolences to the German Minister in Dublin upon learning of the death of Adolf Hitler.
- At the United Nations Conference on International Organization, in San Francisco four committees began work on a United Nations charter.
- The government of Portugal ordered official flags to fly at half-mast in a day of national mourning for the death of Adolf Hitler.
- The romance film The Valley of Decision starring Greer Garson and Gregory Peck was released.
- Born: Jeffrey C. Hall, geneticist and chronobiologist, recipient of the Nobel Prize in Physiology or Medicine in 2017, in New York City; Davey Lopes, American baseball player; in East Providence, Rhode Island

== May 4, 1945 (Friday) ==
- German surrender at Lüneburg Heath: At Bernard Montgomery's headquarters, Wehrmacht forces in northwestern Germany, the Netherlands and Denmark surrendered to the Allies, effective at 8:00 a.m. on May 5.
- The Seventh United States Army captured Innsbruck, Salzburg and Berchtesgaden. The Holy Crown of Hungary was recovered in Mattsee, Austria, by the U.S. 86th Infantry Division, and eventually taken to the U.S. Bullion Depository (Fort Knox) for safe keeping.
- Soviet troops liberated Oranienburg concentration camp.
- Born: N. Ram, Indian journalist; in Madras, British India
- Died: Konrad Barde, 47, German Generalmajor (suicide); Fedor von Bock, 64, German field marshal (killed by a strafing British aircraft while traveling by car)

== May 5, 1945 (Saturday) ==
- Preparation for surrender of German forces in Norway began. With only some 30,000 Allied troops on hand against 350,000 German troops, a surrender was not immediately accepted by General Montgomery, and was later accomplished through preliminary persuasion and negotiation from Sir Andrew Thorne.
- The Prague uprising began when the Czech resistance launched an attempt to liberate the city of Prague from German occupation. The Battle of Czechoslovak Radio began.
- The Bratislava–Brno Offensive ended in Soviet-Romanian victory.
- The Battle for Castle Itter was fought in Austria, resulting in Allied victory.
- Japanese balloon bombs achieved their only success of the war when one killed five children and a pregnant woman near Bly, Oregon.
- The cartoon character Yosemite Sam first appeared in the Bugs Bunny animated short Hare Trigger.
- The Shakespearian-class trawler Coriolanus struck a mine west of Novigrad and sank.
- Born: Kurt Loder, American film critic, author, columnist and television personality; in Ocean City, New Jersey
- Died: Otto-Heinrich Drechsler, 50, German Nazi Commissioner of Latvia (committed suicide in British captivity)

== May 6, 1945 (Sunday) ==
- The Siege of Breslau ended after three months with Soviet victory.
- The 16th Armored Division of George S. Patton's Third Army captured Plzeň. Much to Patton's disgust, his men were prevented from advancing any further due to the occupation agreement between the Americans and the Soviets.
- German submarines U-853 and U-881 were lost to enemy action in the Atlantic Ocean.
- In the United States, the midnight curfew for all places of entertainment in effect since February 26 was lifted.
- Born:
  - Jimmie Dale Gilmore, American country musician; in Amarillo, Texas
  - Bob Seger, American musician; in Lincoln Park, Michigan

== May 7, 1945 (Monday) ==
- German general Alfred Jodl and admiral Hans-Georg von Friedeburg signed unconditional surrender documents at 2:41 a.m. at General Dwight D. Eisenhower's headquarters in Reims. At 2:27 p.m. Lutz Graf Schwerin von Krosigk, Leading Minister in the rump Flensburg Government, made a broadcast announcing the German surrender. Also this afternoon, American journalist Edward Kennedy broke an Allied embargo on news of the signing.
- The Battle of Kuryłówka was fought in southeastern Poland between anti-communists and Soviet NKVD units. The battle ended in a victory for the underground Polish forces.
- V-E Day celebrations in Halifax, Nova Scotia, got out of control when several thousand servicemen, merchant seamen and civilians went on a rampage and looted the city. Tensions had been high in Halifax for years due to the presence of thousands of servicemen straining the city's resources to the limit.
- Soviet newspaper Pravda carried the findings of a Soviet commission of enquiry into Auschwitz concentration camp (described as Oświęcim), making many details of the conditions there public for the first time but without mention that the majority of the inmates were Jewish; the report was published the following day in the English-language press.
- Francoist Spain severed diplomatic relations with Nazi Germany.
- The U.S. Supreme Court decided Jewell Ridge Coal Corp. v. United Mine Workers of America.
- The British government in India published the report of an official commission of enquiry into the Bengal famine of 1943 stating that it could have been prevented by government action.

== May 8, 1945 (Tuesday) ==
- Victory in Europe Day was observed by the Western Allies. At 11:00 p.m. the German Instrument of Surrender was signed in Karlshorst, Berlin, signifying the defeat of Nazi Germany.

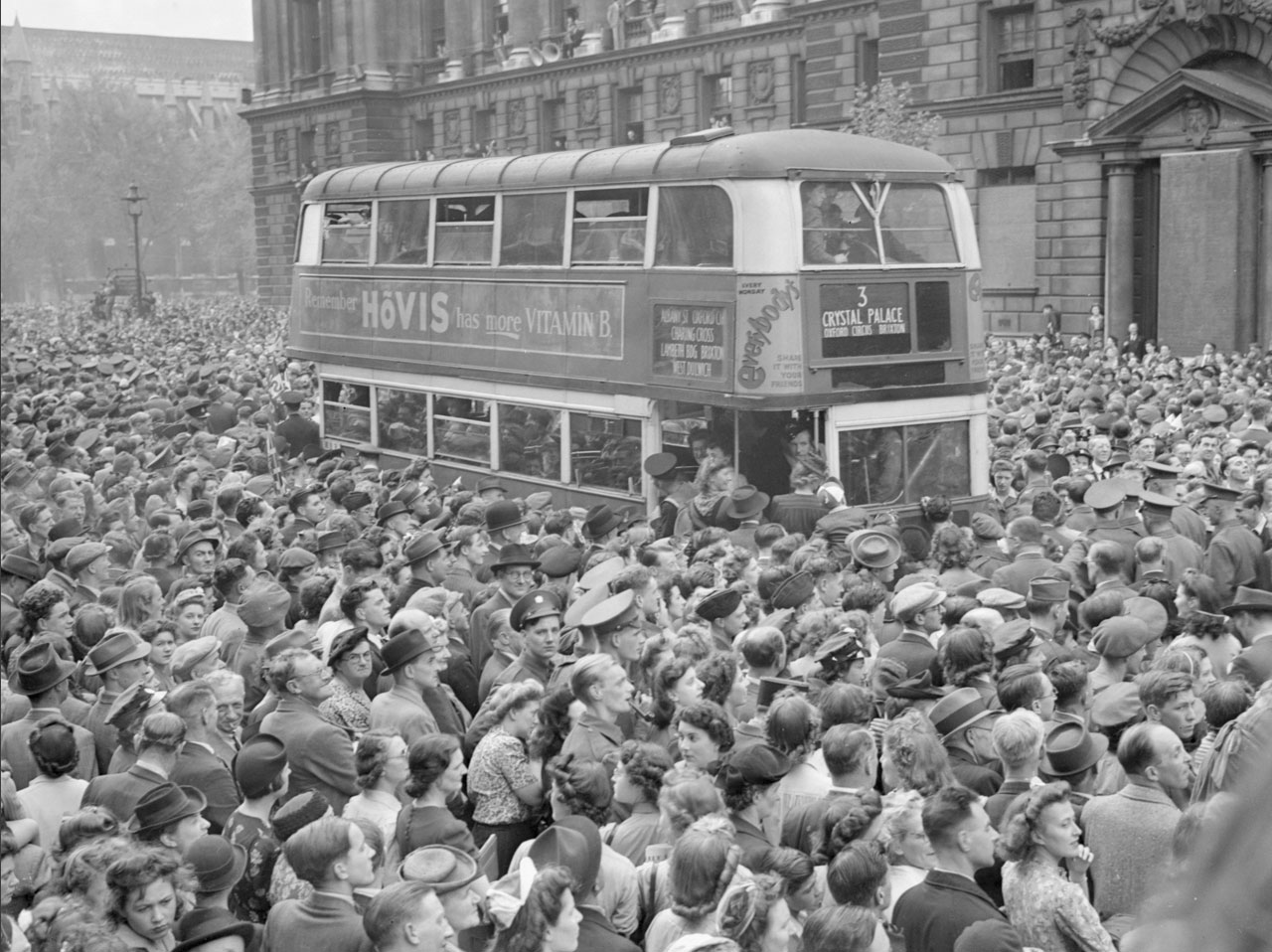
People gathered in Whitehall to hear Winston Churchill's victory speech and celebrate Victory in Europe

- At 3:00 p.m. (local time) Winston Churchill announced Germany's unconditional surrender in a radio broadcast from London. "Our gratitude to our splendid Allies goes forth from all our hearts in this Island and throughout the British Empire," Churchill stated. "We may allow ourselves a brief period of rejoicing; but let us not forget for a moment the toil and efforts that lie ahead. Japan, with all her treachery and greed, remains unsubdued. The injury she has inflicted on Great Britain, the United States, and other countries, and her detestable cruelties, call for justice and retribution. We must now devote all our strength and resources to the completion of our task, both at home and abroad."
- At 9:00 a.m. (local time) U.S. President Harry S. Truman (on his birthday) announced the surrender in a broadcast from the Oval Office and declared May 13 to be a national day of prayer. "I call upon the people of the United States, whatever their faith, to unite in offering joyful thanks to God for the victory we have won and to pray that He will support us to the end of our present struggle and guide us into the way of peace," the proclamation read. "I also call upon my countrymen to dedicate this day of prayer to the memory of those who have given their lives to make possible our victory."
- At 12:30 p.m. (local time) President Karl Dönitz announced the surrender to the German people in a speech broadcast from Flensburg, mentioning that the Nazi Party no longer had any role in government.
- Hermann Göring gave himself up to the Americans on a road near Radstadt, Austria. His Mercedes-Benz headed a column of staff cars and lorries carrying expensive luggage, and after being taken into custody he posed happily for photographers, drank champagne and chatted amiably with the American officers. When General Eisenhower learned of the friendly reception he became furious, and Göring soon found himself unceremoniously spirited away to a house in Augsburg for interrogation.
- German submarines were ordered to surface and report to the Allies.
- Canadian troops moved into Amsterdam, after the surrender of German troops.
- The Prague uprising ended with a ceasefire.
- The surrender of the Dodecanese was signed in Symi.
- The Eighth British Army, together with Slovene partisan troops and a motorized detachment of the Yugoslav 4th Army, arrived in Carinthia and Klagenfurt. The Croatian Armed Forces of the disestablished Independent State of Croatia were ordered by their commanders not to surrender to the Yugoslav Partisans, but to attempt to retreat to Austria and surrender to the British, part of the events leading to the Bleiburg repatriations.
- The Massacre in Trhová Kamenice occurred when German troops in the Czech village of Trhová Kamenice shot supposed partisans.
- The Sétif and Guelma massacre began when French police fired on local demonstrators at a protest in the Algerian market town of Sétif. Riots that followed would result in a total of 103 deaths in and around the town.
- The South Tyrolean People's Party was founded in northern Italy.
- Born: Keith Jarrett, American jazz and classical pianist and composer; in Allentown, Pennsylvania
- Died: Ernst-Günther Baade, 47, German general (gangrene from wounds sustained in battle two weeks earlier); Paul Giesler, 49, German Nazi official (suicide); Werner von Gilsa, 56, German military officer (suicide after being captured by the Russians); Wilhelm Rediess, 44, German commander of SS troops in Norway (suicide by gunshot); Bernhard Rust, 61, German Nazi Minister of Science, Education and National Culture (suicide); Josef Terboven, 46, German Reichskommissar for Norway during the Nazi occupation (committed suicide by detonating dynamite in a bunker)

== May 9, 1945 (Wednesday) ==
- The final Wehrmachtbericht (armed forces report) was broadcast in Germany, reporting that "the German Wehrmacht succumbed with honor to enormous superiority. Loyal to his oath, the German soldier's performance in a supreme effort for his people can never be forgotten. Up to the last moment the homeland had supported him with all its strength in an effort entailing the heaviest sacrifices. The unique performance of the front and homeland will find a final appraisal in the later, just judgment of history. The enemy, too, will not deny his tribute of respect to the performance and sacrifices of German soldiers on land, at sea and in the air. Every soldier, therefore, may lay aside his weapon proud and erect and set to work in these gravest hours of our history with courage and confidence to safeguard the undying life of our people."
- Joseph Stalin issued a V-E Order of the Day, congratulating the Red Army "upon the victorious termination of the Great Patriotic War. To mark the complete victory over Germany, today, on May 9, the Day of Victory, at 10 P.M., the capital of our Motherland-Moscow-on behalf of the Motherland, will salute the gallant troops of the Red Army and the ships and units of the Navy which have won this brilliant victory, by firing thirty artillery salvos from 1,000 guns." On this day, the Army's 1st Ukrainian Front entered Prague.
- The Battle for Czech Radio in Prague ended in Czech victory.
- General Alexander Löhr, Commander of German Army Group E near Topolšica, Slovenia, signed the capitulation of German occupation troops.
- Liberation of the German-occupied Channel Islands: British forces took the surrender of troops occupying Jersey and Guernsey.
- Vidkun Quisling and other members of the collaborationist Quisling regime in Norway surrendered to the Resistance (Milorg) and police at Møllergata 19 in Oslo, as part of the legal purge in Norway after World War II. The British began Operation Doomsday when the 1st Airborne Division began landing in Norway to act as a police and military force.
- Soviet Foreign Minister Vyacheslav Molotov left the United Nations conference for Moscow with the Polish question still unresolved.
- Stutthof concentration camp was liberated. It was the first German concentration camp set up outside German borders in World War II, in operation from 2 September 1939. It was also the last camp liberated by the Allies.
- Born: Jupp Heynckes, German footballer and manager; in Mönchengladbach
- Died: Walter Frank, 40, German Nazi historian (suicide)

== May 10, 1945 (Thursday) ==
- Citizens of Prague, the last European capital to be liberated, cheered as Soviet troops entered the city.
- The German garrison at Lorient surrendered, accounting for 24,850 prisoners.
- German General Heinz Guderian surrendered to U.S. troops.
- Liberation of the German-occupied Channel Islands: Occupation of Sark ended, with British forces taking the surrender of the occupying troops and leaving them under the orders of Dame Sibyl Hathaway.
- Died: Richard Glücks, 56, German Nazi official (suicide by cyanide capsule); Konrad Henlein, 47, Sudeten German politician and Nazi (committed suicide while in American captivity by cutting his veins with his broken glasses)

== May 11, 1945 (Friday) ==
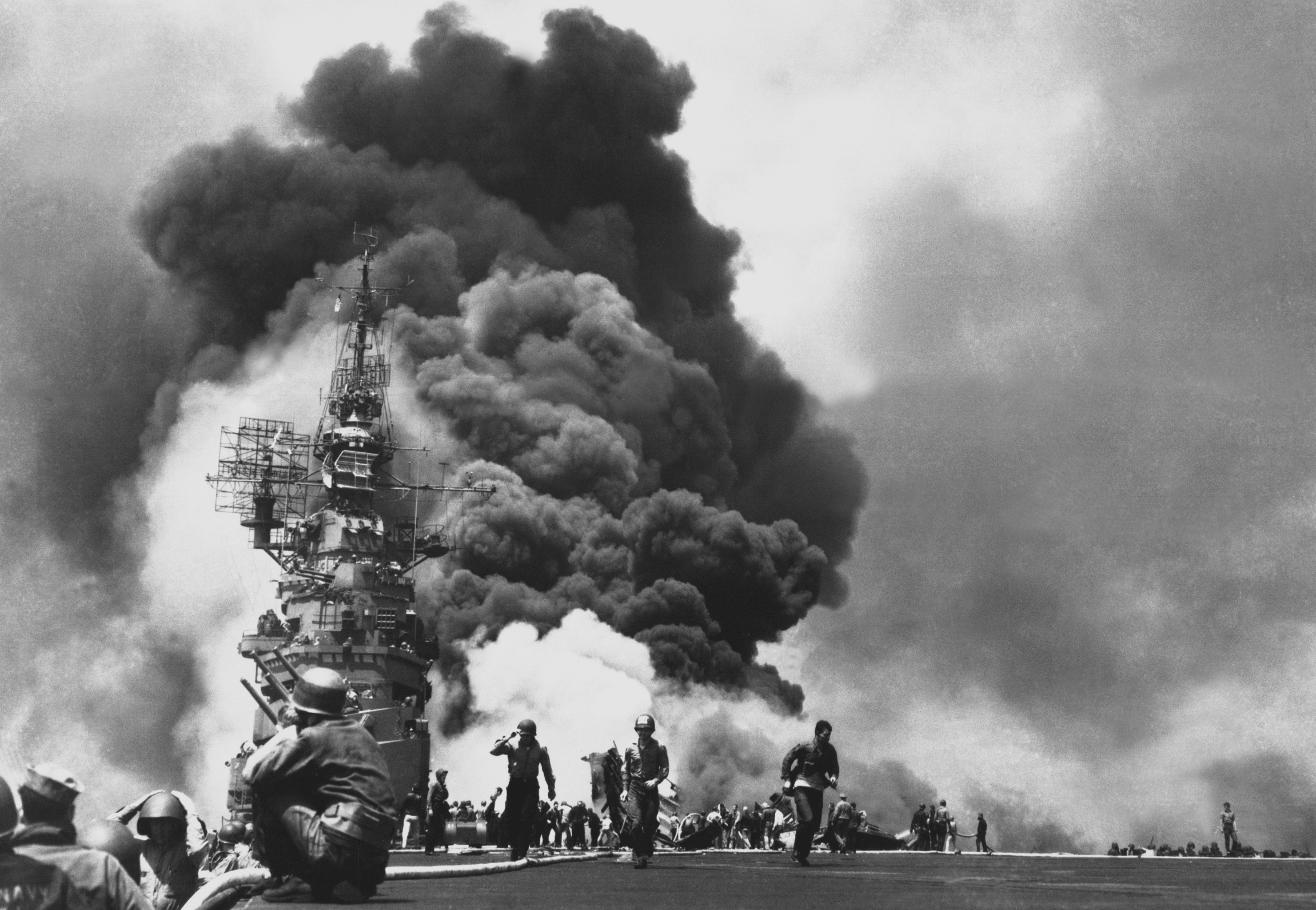
USS Bunker Hill hit by two kamikazes

- While supporting the Battle of Okinawa, the aircraft carrier USS Bunker Hill (CV-17) was badly damaged by Japanese kamikaze attacks and suffered about 600 casualties.
- The Battle of West Henan–North Hubei ended in tactical stalemate but a Japanese operational victory.
- General Eisenhower ordered that no combat soldiers who had fought in North Africa and Europe were to be sent to the Pacific.
- Died: Markus Faulhaber, 30, German Waffen-SS Sturmbannführer (drowned in a vehicular accident in Austria); Kiyoshi Ogawa, 22, and Seizō Yasunori, 21, Japanese kamikaze pilots killed in the attack on USS Bunker Hill

== May 12, 1945 (Saturday) ==
- The United Nations War Crimes Commission indicted Hermann Göring, Joseph Goebbels and Fritz Sauckel on eight counts.
- The U.S. Eighth Army captured Del Monte Airfield on Mindanao.
- The Security Committee at the United Nations Conference on International Organization agreed on an eleven-member security council, with non-permanent members chosen by the General Assembly.
- Rev. Wilbert Awdry's The Three Railway Engines, the first book in The Railway Series for children, was published in the U.K.
- Died: Richard Thomalla, 41, German SS commander and war criminal (executed by NKVD)

== May 13, 1945 (Sunday) ==
- The Battle of Pokoku and Irrawaddy River operations in Burma ended in decisive British victory.
- Winston Churchill gave a radio address telling the British people that "there is still a lot to do" and that "above all we must labor that the world organization which the United Nations are creating at San Francisco, does not become an idle name ... We must never forget that beyond all lurks Japan, harassed and failing but still a people of a hundred millions, for whose warriors death has few terrors. I cannot tell you tonight how much time or what exertions will be required to compel them to make amends for their odious treachery and cruelty. We have received-like China so long undaunted-we have received horrible injuries from them ourselves, and we are bound by the ties of honor and fraternal loyalty to the United States to fight this great war at the other end of the world at their side without flagging or failing."
- Riots took place outside a Catholic church in Santiago, Chile holding a mass in memory of Benito Mussolini. Several people were injured and four arrests were made.
- Captain from Castile by Samuel Shellabarger topped the New York Times Fiction Best Sellers list.
- Born: Kazys Uscila, Lithuanian journalist, translator of Polish and Russian literature; near to Vievis, Lithuania

== May 14, 1945 (Monday) ==
- The Battle of Poljana began in Yugoslavia.
- The Berlin U-Bahn resumes partial service in Berlin, under Soviet control.
- The provisional government of Austria nullified the 1938 Anschluss, declared the country to be once more independent and abolished the Nazi Party and all Nazi-era laws.
- Born: Yochanan Vollach, Israeli footballer; in Kiryat Bialik, Mandatory Palestine
- Died: Heber J. Grant, 88, American religious leader and seventh president of the LDS Church; Louis J. Hauge, Jr., 20, U.S. Marine and posthumous recipient of the Medal of Honor (killed in action during the Battle of Okinawa); Wolfgang Lüth, 31, German U-boat ace (accidentally shot and killed by a German sentry)

== May 15, 1945 (Tuesday) ==
- The Battle of Poljana ended in victory for the Yugoslav Partisans.
- The naval engagement known as the Battle of the Malacca Strait began between five British destroyers and one Japanese heavy cruiser and one destroyer.
- Japan abrogated all treaties with Germany, Italy and the other Axis countries.
- The comic book Marge's Little Lulu was published, marking the first appearance of Little Lulu in comic book form. The character, created by Marjorie Henderson Buell, had first appeared in a series of single-panel cartoons that ran in The Saturday Evening Post between 1935 and 1944.
- Born: Duarte Pio, Duke of Braganza; in Bern, Switzerland
- Died: Kenneth J. Alford, 64, British soldier and composer; Charles Williams, 58, British author

== May 16, 1945 (Wednesday) ==
- The Battle of the Malacca Strait ended in British victory and the sinking of the Japanese heavy cruiser Haguro.
- Born: Nicky Chinn, English-American songwriter and record producer; in London, England
- Died: Kaju Sugiura, 49, Japanese admiral (killed in the sinking of the Haguro)

== May 17, 1945 (Thursday) ==
- French troops landed in Beirut to reassert colonial control.
- Denmark broke diplomatic relations with Japan.
- A British white paper outlined postwar independence for Burma.
- Born: Tony Roche, Australian tennis player; in Wagga Wagga
- Died: Bobby Hutchins, 20, American child actor who played Wheezer in the Our Gang comedy short films (aviation accident at Merced Army Air Field in California)

== May 18, 1945 (Friday) ==
- During the Battle of Okinawa, the Tenth United States Army captured Sugar Loaf Hill.
- The U.S. Department of Justice announced the deportation of Nazi activist Fritz Julius Kuhn to Germany.
- Operation Unthinkable: British Prime Minister Winston Churchill secretly requested his military chiefs of staff to consider a plan for British, American and reactivated German forces to attack the Soviet Red Army on July 1 to preserve the independence of Poland. The operation was ruled militarily unfeasible.
- Died: William Joseph Simmons, 65, American founder of the second Ku Klux Klan

== May 19, 1945 (Saturday) ==
- Australian troops completed the conquest of Tarakan Island.
- British submarine HMS Terrapin (P323) was depth charged and damaged in the Java Sea by Japanese warships and rendered a constructive total loss.
- The Czechoslovak Extraordinary People's Court distributed over twenty thousand sentences - seven percent of them being for life or the death sentence - to "traitors, collaborators and fascist elements."
- Born: Pete Townshend, English guitarist, singer and songwriter (The Who); in Chiswick, London
- Died: Philipp Bouhler, 45, German Nazi official (committed suicide with a cyanide capsule while in a U.S. internment camp)

== May 20, 1945 (Sunday) ==
- U.S. forces captured Malaybalay on Mindanao.
- The Georgian uprising on Texel ended when Canadian forces arrived to enforce the German surrender and disarmed the remaining German troops.
- Died: Fritz Kater, 83, German trade unionist (died of wounds sustained twelve days earlier attempting to defuse a bazooka shell)

== May 21, 1945 (Monday) ==
- The Attack on the NKVD Camp in Rembertów took place on the outskirts of Warsaw. A unit of the pro-independence Home Army freed all Polish political prisoners from the Soviet NKVD camp.
- The British Labour Party decided at a meeting in Blackpool to withdraw its support for Winston Churchill's coalition government and force a national election.
- Born: Richard Hatch, American actor, writer and producer; in Santa Monica, California (d. 2017); Ernst Messerschmid, German physicist and astronaut; in Reutlingen

== May 22, 1945 (Tuesday) ==
- The Battle of the Hongorai River in New Guinea ended in Australian victory.

== May 23, 1945 (Wednesday) ==
- The Flensburg Government was dissolved by the Allies and its leaders were arrested, officially bringing to an end the era of the Third Reich.
- Churchill resigned as prime minister at the request of King George VI and formed a caretaker ministry that would govern until Britain could hold elections on July 5.
- President Truman performed a cabinet reshuffle. Tom C. Clark replaced Francis Biddle as Attorney General, Lewis B. Schwellenbach succeeded Frances Perkins as Labor Secretary and Clinton Presba Anderson replaced Claude R. Wickard as Agriculture Secretary.
- The United Nations Conference in San Francisco approved veto rights for the Big Five powers (China, France, the Soviet Union, the United Kingdom and the United States) on the Security Council.
- The notorious SS Commander Heinrich Himmler, captured on 21 May, died by cyanide capsule while in a British interrogation center.
- Born: Lauren Chapin, American child actress; in Los Angeles, California
- Died:
  - Hans-Georg von Friedeburg, 49, German admiral (suicide)
  - Heinrich Himmler, 44, German Nazi and Reichsführer-SS (suicide)

== May 24, 1945 (Thursday) ==
- During the Battle of Okinawa, the U.S. Tenth Army crossed the Asato River and entered the city of Naha.
- 550 U.S. bombers raided Tokyo with 4,500 tons of incendiaries.
- Born: Priscilla Presley (born Priscilla Wagner), American actress and business magnate; in Brooklyn, New York
- Died: Robert Ritter von Greim, 52, German field marshal, pilot and the last commander of the Luftwaffe (suicide by cyanide capsule)

== May 25, 1945 (Friday) ==
- The Battle of Odžak - the last battle of World War II in Europe - ended in victory for the Yugoslav Partisans.
- American landing ship USS LSM-135 was sunk by a Japanese kamikaze attack off Okinawa.
- Died: Ishii Kikujirō, 79, Japanese diplomat and cabinet minister (presumably killed during the firebombing of Tokyo)

== May 26, 1945 (Saturday) ==
- Allied headquarters transferred to Frankfurt.
- The Berlin Philharmonic gave its first performance since the end of the European war in the Titania Palace Theatre.
- Born: Vilasrao Deshmukh, Indian politician; in Babhalgaon, British India (d. 2012)

== May 27, 1945 (Sunday) ==
- The U.S. Sixth Army on Luzon captured Santa Fe and attacked around Wawa Dam.
- Died: Rudolf Querner, 51, German SS officer and police leader (committed suicide while in captivity)

== May 28, 1945 (Monday) ==
- The American destroyer USS Drexler was sunk northwest of Okinawa by a Japanese kamikaze attack.
- Broadcaster William Joyce ("Lord Haw-Haw") was arrested by the British in Flensburg, Germany.
- Born: Patch Adams, American physician, comedian, social activist and author; in Washington, D.C.; John Fogerty, American guitarist, singer and songwriter (Creedence Clearwater Revival); in Berkeley, California

== May 29, 1945 (Tuesday) ==
- 454 B-29s of the U.S. Twentieth Air Force dropped 2,570 tons of bombs on Yokohama and obliterated 85 percent of the city.
- French forces shelled Damascus as clashes between French troops and natives spread in Syria.
- Born: Gary Brooker, English singer, songwriter and pianist (Procol Harum), in Hackney, County of London (d. 2022)

== May 30, 1945 (Wednesday) ==
- The Brno death march, part of the expulsion of the German minority inhabitants of the Czech city of Brno, began.
- French troops took over the Damascus parliament building amid continued unrest in Syria.
- Born: Gladys Horton, American R&B and pop singer; in Gainesville, Florida (d. 2011)

== May 31, 1945 (Thursday) ==
- U.S. aircraft carried out the Raid on Taipei, resulting in thousands of dead and wounded despite American efforts to minimize civilian casualties.
- Levant Crisis: Winston Churchill informed Charles de Gaulle that British forces had been instructed to "intervene" in Levant states to end bloodshed and avoid threat to Allied supply lines in the Pacific.
- Born: Rainer Werner Fassbinder, German film director, screenwriter and actor; in Bad Wörishofen (d. 1982); Laurent Gbagbo, 4th President of Côte d'Ivoire; in Gagnoa, French West Africa
- Died: Odilo Globocnik, 41, Austrian Nazi (suicide by cyanide capsule after being captured by the British)
