= June 1945 =

Month of 1945

<<	June 1945					>>
Su	Mo	Tu	We	Th	Fr	Sa
					1	2
3	4	5	6	7	8	9
10	11	12	13	14	15	16
17	18	19	20	21	22	23
24	25	26	27	28	29	30

June 24, 1945: The Soviet Union celebrates Victory Day over the Nazis with a parade on Red Square

The following events occurred in June 1945:

== June 1, 1945 (Friday) ==
- Escorting 521 B-29 bombers, 27 P-51 Mustangs (of 148) were lost in a thunderstorm en route to attacking Osaka.
- Charles de Gaulle accused the British of meddling in French affairs. In response, the British accused the French of using Lend-Lease equipment to fight the Syrians and Lebanese in violation of the agreement with the United States.
- Born: Frederica von Stade, mezzo-soprano, in Somerville, New Jersey

== June 2, 1945 (Saturday) ==
- Pope Pius XII gave an address to the Sacred College of Cardinals warning that danger still existed in Europe, including "those mobs of dispossessed, disillusioned, disappointed, hopeless men who are going to swell the ranks of revolution and disorder in the pay of a tyranny no less despotic than those for whose overthrow men planned."
- In San Francisco, the Soviet delegation demanded a right of veto in the proposed United Nations Security Council.
- "Sentimental Journey" by Les Brown topped the Billboard singles charts.
- Born: Jon Peters, film producer, in Van Nuys, Los Angeles, California
- Died: August Hirt, 47, German anatomist and Nazi who performed experiments on concentration camp inmates (suicide)

== June 3, 1945 (Sunday) ==
- French troops left Damascus for billets outside the city. They were replaced by British peacekeeping forces.
- Born: Hale Irwin, golfer, in Joplin, Missouri
- Died: Vikenty Veresaev, 78, Russian writer and doctor

== June 4, 1945 (Monday) ==
- Winston Churchill committed a political gaffe during the UK election campaign when he said during a broadcast that a Labour government would require "some form of Gestapo" to enforce its agenda.
- Two regiments of the U.S. 6th Marine Division landed on the Oruku peninsula on Okinawa in an attempt to outflank the Japanese defensive positions.
- A general election was held in the Canadian province of Ontario. The Progressive Conservative Party led by George A. Drew increased their legislative seat count from a minority to a majority and would remain in power for the next 40 consecutive years.
- Born: Anthony Braxton, jazz saxophonist and composer, in Chicago, Illinois; Gordon Waller, singer, songwriter and guitarist (Peter and Gordon), in Braemar, Scotland (d. 2009)

== June 5, 1945 (Tuesday) ==
Germany is occupied in 4 zones by the Allied Powers following the Berlin Declaration

- The Berlin Declaration was signed by the United States, USSR, Britain and France, confirming the complete legal dissolution of Nazi Germany.
- 473 B-29 Superfortress bombers raided Kobe, dropping 3,000 tons of incendiary bombs.
- The U.S. 6th Marine Division captured most of the airfield on the Oruku peninsula.
- The U.S. Court of Appeals upheld Esquire magazine's second class mailing privileges after Postmaster General Frank C. Walker had suspended them on the grounds of the magazine's "Vargas Girl" drawings and other content being considered morally substandard. The case would go all the way to the Supreme Court with Hannegan v. Esquire, Inc. in 1946.
- Born: John Carlos, American Olympic track and field athlete and football player, in Harlem, New York

== June 6, 1945 (Wednesday) ==
- A Soviet spokesman from Georgy Zhukov's staff announced that Adolf Hitler's body had been found and identified in the Chancellery gardens.
- Brazil declared war on Japan.
- Czech troops ordered to massacre 5 German youths in Postoloprty (Postelberg).
- Born: David Dukes, character actor, in San Francisco, California (d. 2000)

== June 7, 1945 (Thursday) ==
- The Battle of West Hunan ended in Allied victory.
- Joseph Stalin instructed the Soviet delegation at San Francisco to drop its request for a Big Five veto over discussion of international disputes.
- King George VI visited the Channel Islands to pay tribute to their resolve under German occupation.
- Winston Churchill refused a demand from the House of Commons to reveal all that was discussed at the Yalta Conference, but said that there were no secret agreements.
- Born: Billy Butler, soul singer and songwriter, in Chicago, Illinois (d. 2015); Wolfgang Schüssel, Chancellor of Austria from 2000 to 2007, in Vienna

== June 8, 1945 (Friday) ==
- The Battle of Porton Plantation began on Bougainville Island.
- Action of 8 June 1945: Japanese cruiser Ashigara was torpedoed and sunk in the Bangka Strait by the British submarine Trenchant with the loss of about 1,300 lives.
- U.S. Undersecretary of State Joseph Grew denied reports that Russia would be given Korea among other states in exchange for its entry into the Pacific war.
- The musical film Wonder Man starring Danny Kaye and Virginia Mayo was released.
- Born: Steven Fromholz, country musician, actor and poet, in Temple, Texas (d. 2014)
- Died: Robert Desnos, 44, French surrealist poet (typhoid in Theresienstadt concentration camp); Karl Hanke, 41, German Nazi official (killed by Czech partisans while trying to escape captivity)

== June 9, 1945 (Saturday) ==
- An agreement was signed in Belgrade in which Yugoslavia agreed to evacuate Trieste and allow it to be occupied by an allied military government until the competing claims to the region were resolved.
- 1.5 million people watched a victory parade for George S. Patton and James Doolittle in Los Angeles, California. The parade was followed by a show in their honor at the Memorial Coliseum emceed by Jack Benny.
- Japanese Prime Minister Kantarō Suzuki told the Diet that Japan would "fight to the last."
- Hoop Jr. won the Kentucky Derby.
- Brooklyn Dodgers manager Leo Durocher was arraigned on charges of assaulting a fan at Ebbets Field. The evidence was too thin to convict Durocher, but a civil suit would force him to pay out a settlement to the victim.
- The all-G.I. musical stage show G.I. Carmen was performed for the first time in Tauberbischofsheim, Germany.
- Born: Nike Wagner, arts administrator and scholar, in Überlingen, Germany.

== June 10, 1945 (Sunday) ==
- The Battle of Porton Plantation ended in Japanese victory.
- The Battle of North Borneo began.
- The Battle of Labuan began between Allied and Japanese forces for the island of Labuan off Borneo.
- The Battle of Davao ended in decisive Allied victory.
- The American destroyer William D. Porter was sunk by a Japanese kamikaze attack off Okinawa.
- Born: Benny Gallagher, singer-songwriter and multi-instrumentalist (Gallagher and Lyle), in Largs, Scotland

== June 11, 1945 (Monday) ==
- A Canadian federal election was held. The incumbent Liberal Party led by Prime Minister William Lyon Mackenzie King was re-elected to its third consecutive mandate, although it was reduced to a minority government.
- In fighting on Okinawa, American forces captured an important height east of Mount Yaeju but an assault by the U.S. 1st Marine Division failed to capture Kunishi Ridge.
- The U.S. Supreme Court decided In re Summers, ruling 5-4 that the First and Fourteenth Amendment freedoms of a conscientious objector were not infringed when a state bar association declined to admit him to the practice of law.
- Born: Adrienne Barbeau, actress and author, in Sacramento, California

== June 12, 1945 (Tuesday) ==
- American troops on Okinawa took over the Yaeju Dake escarpment, breaching the last defense line of the Japanese garrison.
- Allied troops took over Trieste in accordance with the agreement of June 9.
- Dwight D. Eisenhower received the Freedom of the City of London and the Order of Merit.
- Born: Pat Jennings, footballer, in Newry, Northern Ireland

== June 13, 1945 (Wednesday) ==
- The Australian 9th Infantry Division captured Brunei.
- U.S. Army ordnance experts claimed that German plans to attack the United States with V-2 rockets might have been realized by November 1945 if the war had gone on that long.
- Born: Rodney P. Rempt, Vice Admiral of the United States Navy
- Died: Minoru Ōta, 54, Japanese admiral (suicide by handgun on Okinawa)

== June 14, 1945 (Thursday) ==
- The Northern Ireland general election was held, returning a large Ulster Unionist Party majority.
- Joachim von Ribbentrop was captured in Hamburg.
- An Allied victory parade was held in Rangoon.
- Gen. of the Army Dwight D. Eisenhower was decorated by Gen. Charles De Gaulle with the French Order of Liberation at the Arc de Triomphe. Ike later gave a speech at the Hotel de Ville, Paris attended by all senior military and civilian officials in the city.
- Born: Jörg Immendorff, painter, in Bleckede, Germany (d. 2007)

== June 15, 1945 (Friday) ==
- In the Philippines, the Battle of Bessang Pass ended in Allied victory.
- The longest British Parliament since the Cavalier Parliament of 1661–1679 was formally dissolved ahead of the July 5 elections.
- The North American F-82 Twin Mustang had its first flight.
- The film noir Conflict starring Humphrey Bogart, Alexis Smith and Sydney Greenstreet was released.
- Born: Françoise Chandernagor, writer, in Palaiseau, France
- Died: Carl Gustaf Ekman, 72, two-time prime minister of Sweden

== June 16, 1945 (Saturday) ==
- The American destroyer USS Twiggs was sunk off Okinawa by a Japanese kamikaze attack.
- American troops captured the former Hungarian Prime Minister Béla Imrédy.
- Polynesian won the Preakness Stakes.
- Born: Claire Alexander, ice hockey player, in Collingwood, Ontario, Canada; Ivan Lins, musician, in Rio de Janeiro, Brazil
- Died: Henry Bellamann, 63, American author; Nikolai Berzarin, 41, Soviet military officer (motorcycle accident); Aris Velouchiotis, 39, Greek resistance leader (suicide)

== June 17, 1945 (Sunday) ==
- On Luzon, elements of the 37th Division of the U.S. 1st Corps captured Naguilian after making a forced crossing of the Cagayan River.
- Born: Art Bell, broadcaster and actor, in Camp Lejeune, Jacksonville, North Carolina (d. 2018); Ken Livingstone, 1st Mayor of London, in London, England; Eddy Merckx, bicycle racer, in Meensel-Kiezegem, Belgium
- Died: Edgar Angeli, 53, Croatian rear admiral

== June 18, 1945 (Monday) ==
- Japanese Prime Minister Kantarō Suzuki informed the Japanese Supreme Council of Emperor Hirohito's intention to seek peace with the Allies as soon as possible.
- The American submarine USS Bonefish was sunk in Toyama Bay by Japanese warships.
- Trial of the Sixteen: officers of the Polish Home Army were put on trial in Moscow for fighting the Red Army.
- The U.S. Supreme Court decided Associated Press v. United States, Guaranty Trust Co. v. York and Southern Pacific Co. v. Arizona.
- Died: Simon Bolivar Buckner Jr., 58, American lieutenant general (killed during the Battle of Okinawa)

== June 19, 1945 (Tuesday) ==
- An estimated 4 million people turned out to cheer General Eisenhower in a 35-mile (56 km) motorcade through New York City.
- Spain was denied admission into the United Nations for as long as Francisco Franco held power.
- Iligan fell to the U.S. 1st Corps.
- Leopold III of Belgium refused to abdicate.
- French politician Marcel Déat was sentenced to death in absentia for collaborating with the enemy. He would die in 1955 while still in hiding in Italy.
- The El Teniente mining accident killed 355 men in Chile.
- Born: Radovan Karadžić, 1st President of Republika Srpska, in Petnjica, Šavnik, Yugoslavia; Aung San Suu Kyi, stateswoman and politician, in Rangoon, Burma; Greil Marcus, author, music journalist and cultural critic, in San Francisco, California

== June 20, 1945 (Wednesday) ==
- U.S. Marines on Okinawa reached the southern coast of the island at several points.
- The Australian 26th Infantry Brigade captured Hill 90 on Tarakan Island, ending organized Japanese resistance there.
- The United Nations conference settled its last controversy when the Big Five agreed to let the General Assembly have the right to discuss "any matters within the scope of the charter."
- Born: Anne Murray, singer, in Springhill, Nova Scotia, Canada; Marc Leepson, journalist, historian, author, in Newark, New Jersey, USA

== June 21, 1945 (Thursday) ==
- In Borneo, the Battle of Tarakan ended in Allied victory.
- The Battle of Labuan ended in Allied victory.
- On Okinawa, the Japanese headquarters on Hill 89 was taken by troops of the 32nd Regiment of U.S. 7th Infantry Division.
- The American destroyer USS Barry was sunk northwest of Okinawa by a Japanese kamikaze attack.
- Ferruccio Parri replaced Ivanoe Bonomi as Prime Minister of Italy.
- In Moscow, twelve of the sixteen officers of the Polish Home Army were found guilty of engaging in "underground activities".

== June 22, 1945 (Friday) ==
- The Battle of Okinawa ended in Allied victory.
- General Douglas MacArthur announced that Joseph Stilwell had been made the new commander of the U.S. Tenth Army, replacing Simon Bolivar Buckner, Jr. who had been killed in action four days earlier.
- Request by Emperor Hirohito for peace talks. "I desire that concrete plans to end the war, unhampered by existing policy, be speedily studied and that efforts made to implement them."
- Died: Isamu Chō, 50, Japanese lieutenant general (committed seppuku on Okinawa); Mitsuru Ushijima, 57, Japanese general (committed seppuku on Okinawa)

== June 23, 1945 (Saturday) ==
- Representatives of the Big Four powers (China, the United Kingdom, the United States and the Soviet Union) agreed to admit Poland to the United Nations.
- On Luzon, American paratroopers landed near Aparri without incident.
- Pavot won the Belmont Stakes.
- Died: Giuseppina Tuissi, 22, Italian communist and partisan (disappeared and presumed murdered)

== June 24, 1945 (Sunday) ==
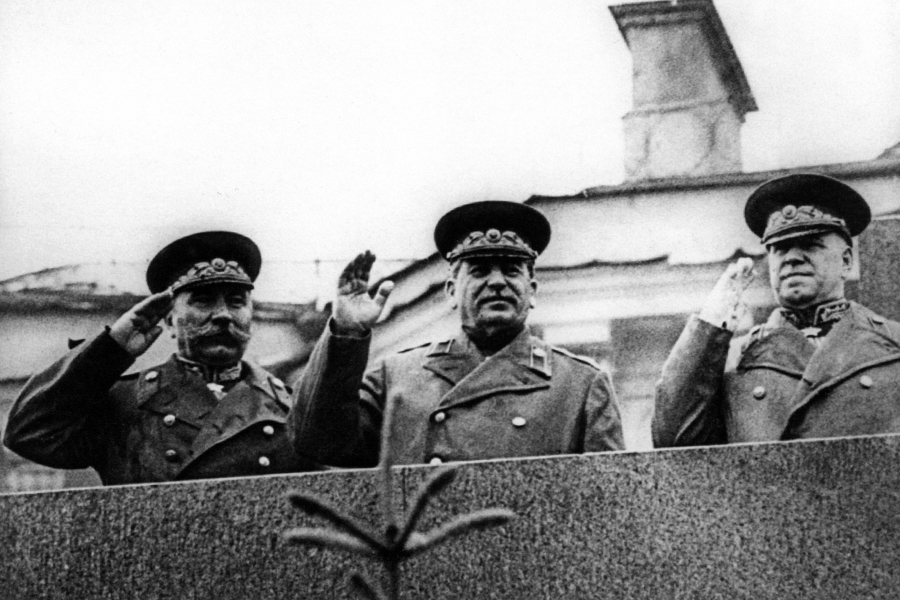
Georgy Zhukov, Joseph Stalin, and Semyon Budyonny watching as the Red Army celebrates Victory Day over the Nazis during a parade at Moscow's Red Square

- A victory parade was held in Moscow, led by Marshal Georgy Zhukov riding a white horse, the traditional Russian mount of a conquering hero. Two hundred captured Nazi banners were ceremonially dragged through Red Square and thrown on the ground before Lenin's Tomb.
- Allied forces landed on Halmahera in the Maluku Islands.
- Born: George Pataki, 53rd Governor of New York, in Peekskill, New York

== June 25, 1945 (Monday) ==
- Seán T. O'Kelly became 2nd President of Ireland.
- Einar Gerhardsen became Prime Minister of Norway.
- American forces on Luzon captured Tuguegarao and Gattaran.
- The Simla Conference to discuss the future Indian government of India began in Simla, India.

== June 26, 1945 (Tuesday) ==
- The United Nations Conference on International Organization concluded when the United Nations Charter was signed at the San Francisco War Memorial and Performing Arts Center by 50 of the 51 original member countries.
- The Christian Democratic Union of Germany was founded.
- The biographical film Rhapsody in Blue starring Robert Alda as George Gershwin premiered in New York City.

== June 27, 1945 (Wednesday) ==
- American forces on Luzon completed the occupation of the Cagayan Valley, effectively completing the recapture of the entire island.
- Japanese submarine I-165 was sunk east of Saipan by an American PV-2 Harpoon patrol bomber.
- The new supreme military rank of Generalissimo of the Soviet Union was created for and conferred on Joseph Stalin, though he continued to go by the title of Marshal.
- Born: Lu Sheng-yen, founder and spiritual leader of the True Buddha School, in Chiayi County, Taiwan
- Died: Detleff Neumann-Neurode, 65, German pediatric physical therapist

== June 28, 1945 (Thursday) ==
- The Soviet-backed Provisional Government of National Unity was formed to govern Poland. The Polish government-in-exile did not recognize it.
- General Douglas MacArthur announced that operations on Luzon were complete. About 11,000 Japanese troops remained isolated in the Sierra Madre Mountains and another 12,000 were trapped in the Kiangan-Bontoc region, which would be left for the Eighth United States Army and Filipino units to mop up.

== June 29, 1945 (Friday) ==
- U.S. President Harry S. Truman approved Operation Downfall, the planned invasion of Japan. The plan called for 5 million troops to invade Kyushu starting November 1 and then Honshu starting March 1, 1946.
- The Czechoslovak government ceded Ruthenia to the Soviet Union.
- U.S. General Lucius D. Clay, British General Sir Ronald Weeks, and Soviet Marshal Georgy Zhukov reached an agreement ensuring free access for the Western Allies to Berlin, allowing all road, rail, and air traffic on authorized routes to pass without border searches or military controls.
- Born: Chandrika Kumaratunga, 5th president of Sri Lanka, in Colombo

== June 30, 1945 (Saturday) ==
- American forces on Okinawa completed a week of mop-up operations in which 8,975 Japanese were reported killed and 2,902 captured.
- Liuzhou, the former U.S. air base in China, was recaptured from the Japanese by Chinese forces.
- Died: Muthiah Bhagavatar, 67, Indian composer
