= Raquel Zelaya =

Guatemalan economist and politician (born 1945)

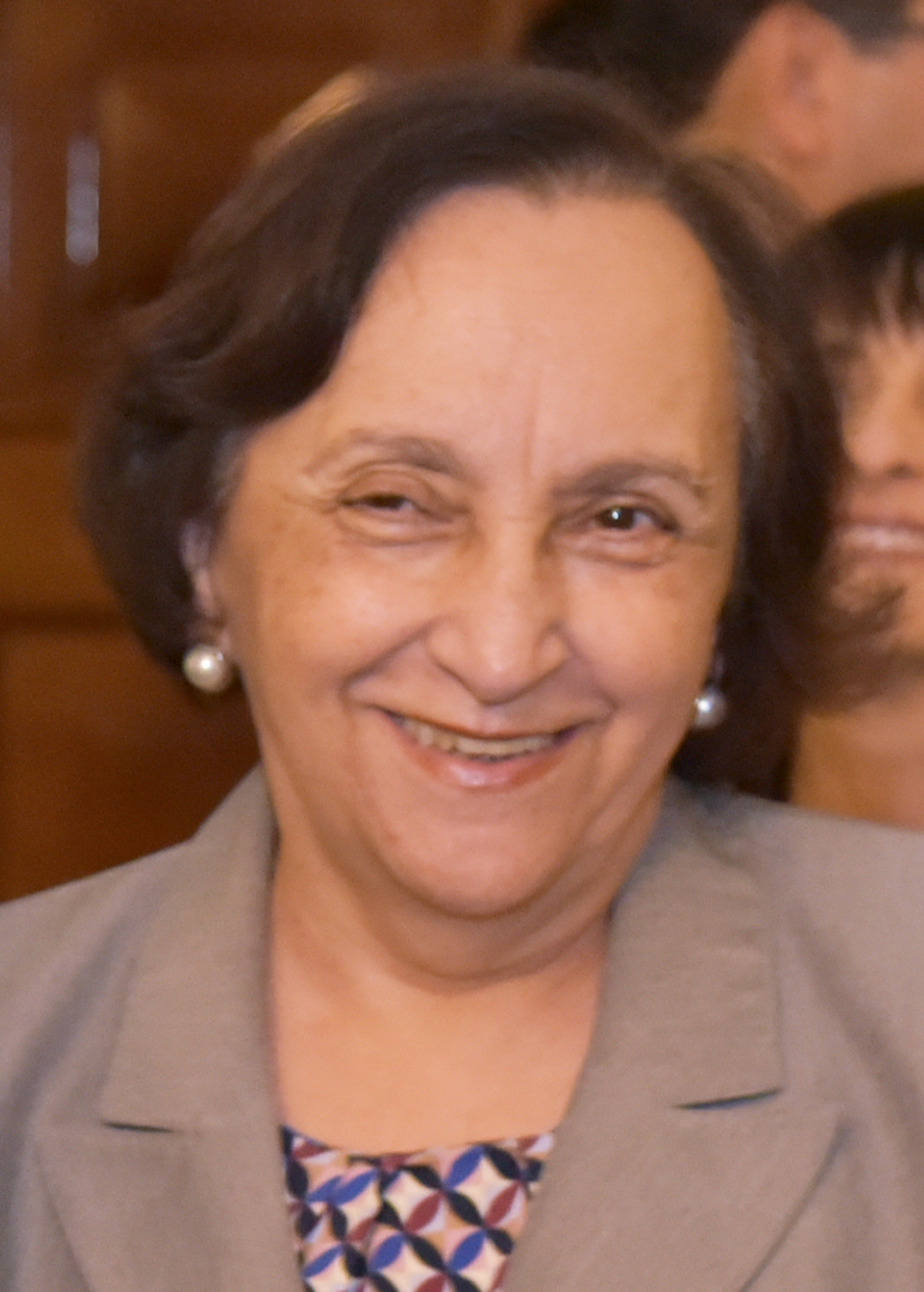
- Zelaya in 2017

Presidential Secretary of Peace
- In office 1997–2000
- President: Alvaro Arzú

Minister of Public Finance in the Government of Guatemala
- In office 16 April 1991 – 14 January 1991
- Preceded by: Marciano Castillo González
- Succeeded by: Richard Aitkenhead Castillo

Personal details
- Born: 21 August 1945 (age 81)
- Education: Rafael Landívar University

Irma Raquel Zelaya Rosales (born 21 August 1945) is a Guatemalan economist and politician. She was Minister of Public Finance in Government of Guatemala in 1991, participated in the signing of the Firm and Lasting Peace Agreement at the end of the Guatemalan Civil War in 1996, and was Presidential Secretary of Peace from 1997 to 2000.

== Biography ==
Zelaya holds a degree in economics from Rafael Landívar University in Guatemala City.

Zelaya was Minister of Public Finance in the Government of Guatemala, from 14 January 1991 to 16 April 1991. She resigned due to disagreements with president Jorge Serrano Elías and because of receiving anonymous death threats linked to her anti-corruption campaigns. She was succeeded as Finance Minister by Richard Aitkenhead Castillo.

After the conclusion of the Guatemalan Civil War (1960–1996), Zelaya participated in the signing of the Firm and Lasting Peace Agreement on 29 December 1996, as Executive Secretary. She was appointed as Presidential Secretary of Peace (SEPAZ) [es] in the government of Alvaro Arzú, from 1997 to 2000.

After her political career, Zelaya founded the non-profit and academic think tank Association for Research and Social Studies (Spanish: Asociación de Investigación y Estudios Sociales, ASIES), of which she is executive director. She was also a member of the United Nations Peacebuilding Fund Commission.

In 2015, Zelaya was on the shortlist to be elected as Vice President of Guatemala, but Alfonso Fuentes Soria was elected to the office.
