= Battle of Tianmen =

Chinese civil war

- Part of the Chinese Civil War
Date	August 17, 1945
Location	Hubei, China
Result	Communist victory

Belligerents
Flag of the National Revolutionary Army National Revolutionary Army	PLA New Fourth Army

Commanders and leaders
Unknown	Unknown

Strength
355+ (55 Japanese and 300+ Nationalist Chinese)	2,000

Casualties and losses
150+ (50 Japanese and 100+ Nationalist Chinese killed)	Several dozen (2+ killed)

The Battle of Tianmen (天门战斗) took place between the nationalists and the communists immediately after World War II during the Chinese Civil War in Tianmen, Hubei, China and resulted in communist victory.

== Prelude ==
Like similar clashes immediately after the end of World War II between the Communists and the Nationalists in China, this conflict was also rooted in the fact that Chiang Kai-shek had realized his nationalist regime simply had neither sufficient troops nor enough transportation assets to deploy his forces into the Japanese-occupied regions of China. Unwilling to let the Communists, who had already dominated most of the rural regions in China, to further expand their territories by accepting the Japanese surrender and thus would consequently control the Japanese-occupied regions, Chiang Kai-shek ordered the Japanese and their Chinese puppet regime not to surrender to the Communists and keep their fighting capabilities to “maintain order” in the Japanese-occupied regions, fighting off the Communists as necessary until the final arrivals and completion of the deployment of the Nationalist troops. As a result, most members of the Japanese puppet regimes and their military forces rejoined the Nationalists.

However, most of these former Nationalists-turned-Japanese-puppet-regime forces were not from Chiang Kai-shek’s own clique, but instead mainly consisted of troops of warlords who were only nominally under Chiang Kai-shek before World War II, since they were Nationalists in name only and mostly maintained their independent and semi-independent status. These warlords were only interested in keeping their own power and defected to the Japanese when Japanese invaders offered to let them keep their power in exchange for their collaboration. After World War II these forces once again returned to the Nationalist camp for the same reason they defected to the Japanese invaders. Obviously it was difficult for Chiang to immediately get rid of these warlords as soon as they surrendered to Chiang and rejoined the Nationalists, because such a move would alienate other factions within the Nationalist ranks, and these former warlords could still help the Nationalists gain more territories by holding on to what was under their control until Chiang completed the deployment of his own troops to take over. Chiang Kai-shek’s objective was to simultaneously solve two problems: the warlord problem that had plagued China for so long and the problem of the extermination of Communism together. This, as subsequent history has shown, was his fatal mistake.

== Nationalist Strategy ==
In accordance with his strategy to simultaneously solve these two problems, Chiang Kai-shek and his followers had hoped that these former Japanese puppet regime's warlords who rejoined the Nationalists would be able to hold on to their territories long enough for Chiang to deploy his own troops. If the Communists were victorious in such conflicts, however, the result could still benefit Chiang and China because the power of these warlords would be reduced as their military forces were smashed by the Communists, and the warlord problem that had plagued China for so long could thus be greatly reduced, while at the same time the Communists would be weakened by their battles with the warlords and Chiang's own troops would have an easier time in taking control.

== The battle ==
After the former nationalist forces who rejoined the nationalists after World War II had refused to surrender to the communists, the only Chinese force in the region under the order of Chiang Kai-shek’s regime, the 15th Brigade of the 5th Division of the communist New Fourth Army launched its offensive in Tianmen, Hubei, China against these units.

The battle lasted several hours, and after 50 Japanese troops and over 100 troops of the former nationalist turned Japanese puppet regime forces who rejoined the nationalists after World War II were killed, the remaining 5 Japanese troops and 200+ troops of the former nationalist turned Japanese puppet regime forces who rejoined the nationalists after World War II were forced to surrender. The communists had captured a cannon, a heavy machine gun, five light machine guns, and over 270 repeating rifles. The communist casualties was light in terms of numbers, but Huang Xiting (黄西廷), a battalion commander and Yang Li (杨力), a battalion level political commissar were among those killed.

== Outcome ==
Like other similar clashes immediately after the end of World War II between the communists and the nationalists in China, this conflict also showed that Chiang Kai-shek’s attempt to simultaneously solve the warlord problem that had plagued China for so long and the problem of the extermination of communism together proved to be a fatal mistake. Although the result of the campaign turned out exactly like Chiang Kai-shek and his subordinates had predicted, and consequently the power of the warlords in this region was indeed reduced as their military forces were smashed by the communists, so that the warlord problem plagued China for so long was thus reduced for this particular region, and Chiang Kai-shek’s secondary objective was achieved here, any positive gains obtained by the nationalists were negated by the politic fallout. The reason was that this success of achieving the secondary objective came at a huge cost in nationalists’ loss of popular support in this region formerly dominated by the Japanese, because the local population had already blamed nationalists for losing the regions to the Japanese invaders, while reassigning these former Japanese puppet regime forces as the nationalist forces to fight the communists, the only Chinese force left in the regions, only further alienated the local populace and strengthened the popular resentment to Chiang Kai-shek and his nationalist regime.

== See also ==
- Outline of the Chinese Civil War
- National Revolutionary Army
- History of the People's Liberation Army
