= 1945 in China =

- Decades: 1920s; 1930s; 1940s; 1950s; 1960s
- See also: Other events of 1945; History of China • Timeline • Years

Events from the year 1945 in the Republic of China. This year is numbered Minguo 34 according to the official Republic of China calendar.

== Incumbents ==
- President – Chiang Kai-shek
- Premier – Chiang Kai-shek (until 31 May); T. V. Soong (starting 31 May)
- Vice Premier – H. H. Kung (until 4 June); Weng Wenhao (starting 4 June)

== Events ==
=== August ===
- August 4 — Second Guangxi Campaign in Guangxi.
- August 9–20 — Soviet invasion of Manchuria
- August 14 — The signing of Sino-Soviet Treaty of Friendship and Alliance between the Republic of China and Soviet Union.
- August 13–28 — Southern Jiangsu Campaign.
- August 15–23 — Battle of Baoying in Jiangsu.
- August 16–19 — Battle of Yongjiazhen in Anhui.
- August 17 — Battle of Tianmen in Hubei.
- August 21 — Zhijiang Surrender Ceremony in Hunan.
- August 24 — Battle of Wuhe in Anhui.
- August 26–27 — Battle of Yinji in Henan.

=== September ===
- September 1–13 — Battle of Dazhongji in Jiangsu.
- September 4–5 — Battle of Lingbi in Anhui.
- September 8–12 — Taixing Campaign in Jiangsu.
- September 13–17 — Wudi Campaign in Shandong.
- September 18 — Battle of Xiangshuikou in Jiangsu.
- September 21 — Battle of Rugao in Jiangsu.

=== October ===
- October 10 — Double Tenth Agreement signing in Chongqing.
- October 12 — Peip'ing C-46 crash near Beiping.
- October 18 — Battle of Houmajia in Anhui.
- October 25
  - Retrocession Day of Taiwan in Zhongshan Hall in Taipei, Taiwan.
  - The establishment of Taiwan Provincial Government in Taiwan.

=== November ===
- November 15 — The renaming of Taihoku Imperial University to National Taiwan University in Taiwan.

=== December ===
- December 19–21 — Battle of Shaobo in Jiangsu.
- December 19–26 — Gaoyou–Shaobo Campaign in Jiangsu.
- December 21–30 — Battle of Tangtou–Guocun in Jiangsu.

== Births ==
=== January ===
- Chen Yuan, economist and eldest son of Chen Yun

=== February ===
- February 12 — Roman Tam, Hong Kong singer (d. 2002)
- February 19 — Nan Rendong, astronomer (d. 2017)

=== March ===
- March 14 — Wang Liqun, historian

=== April ===
- April 5 — Yu Zhengsheng, 8th Chairman of the Chinese People's Political Consultative Conference
- April 11 — An Min, politician
- April 25 — Chiang Hsiao-wu, second son of Chiang Ching-kuo (d. 1991)

=== June ===
- June 1 — Stanley Fung, Hong Kong actor and film director
- June 23 — Michael Sze, Hong Kong government official (d. 2022)
- June 26 — Paul Chun, Hong Kong actor

=== July ===
- July 21 — Lydia Shum, Hong Kong-Canadian comedian, MC, actress and singer (d. 2008)
- Bai Jingfu, politician

=== August ===
- August 7 — Li Dequn, material scientist (d. 2022)
- August 11 — Ma Dehua, actor

=== September ===
- September 24 — Chen Kuan-tai, Hong Kong martial arts actor, director and action choreographer
- September 26 — Ji Yunshi, politician

=== October ===
- October 11 — Zong Qinghou, businessman (d. 2024)
- October 15 — Deng Nan, politician and physicist
- October 22 — Liu Dawei, painter
- October 25 — Lin Kuang-hua, Governor of Taiwan Province (2003-2006)
- October 29 — Ching Li, Hong Kong actress (d. 2017)
- Wang Hongju, 16th Mayor of Chongqing

=== November ===
- November 3 — Eryue He, historical fiction writer (d. 2018)
- November 17 — Jenny Hu, Hong Kong actress
- November 22 — Liu Yandong, Vice Premier of China (d. 2026)
- November 26
  - Huo Da, Hui writer
  - Shang Chuan, historian (d. 2017)
- Sun Dafa, general of the People's Liberation Army (d. 2019)

=== December ===
- December 15 — Ge Jianxiong, historical geographer
- December 23
  - Lin Liguo, son of Chinese Marshal Lin Biao (d. 1971)
  - Min Huifen, erhu performer (d. 2014)

== Deaths ==
- January 26 — Ma Lin, 2nd Governor of Qinghai (b. 1876)
- September 15 — Zhang Mingqi, last Viceroy of Liangguang (b. 1875)
- September 17 — Yu Dafu, short story writer and poet (b. 1896)
- October 30 — Xian Xinghai, composer (b. 1905)
- December 25 — Wang Kemin, leading official in the Chinese republican movement and the Beiyang government (b. 1876)

=== Dates unknown ===
- Peng Yubin

== See also ==
- List of Chinese films of the 1940s
