= September 1945 =

Month of 1945

<<	September 1945					>>
Su	Mo	Tu	We	Th	Fr	Sa
						1
2	3	4	5	6	7	8
9	10	11	12	13	14	15
16	17	18	19	20	21	22
23	24	25	26	27	28	29
30

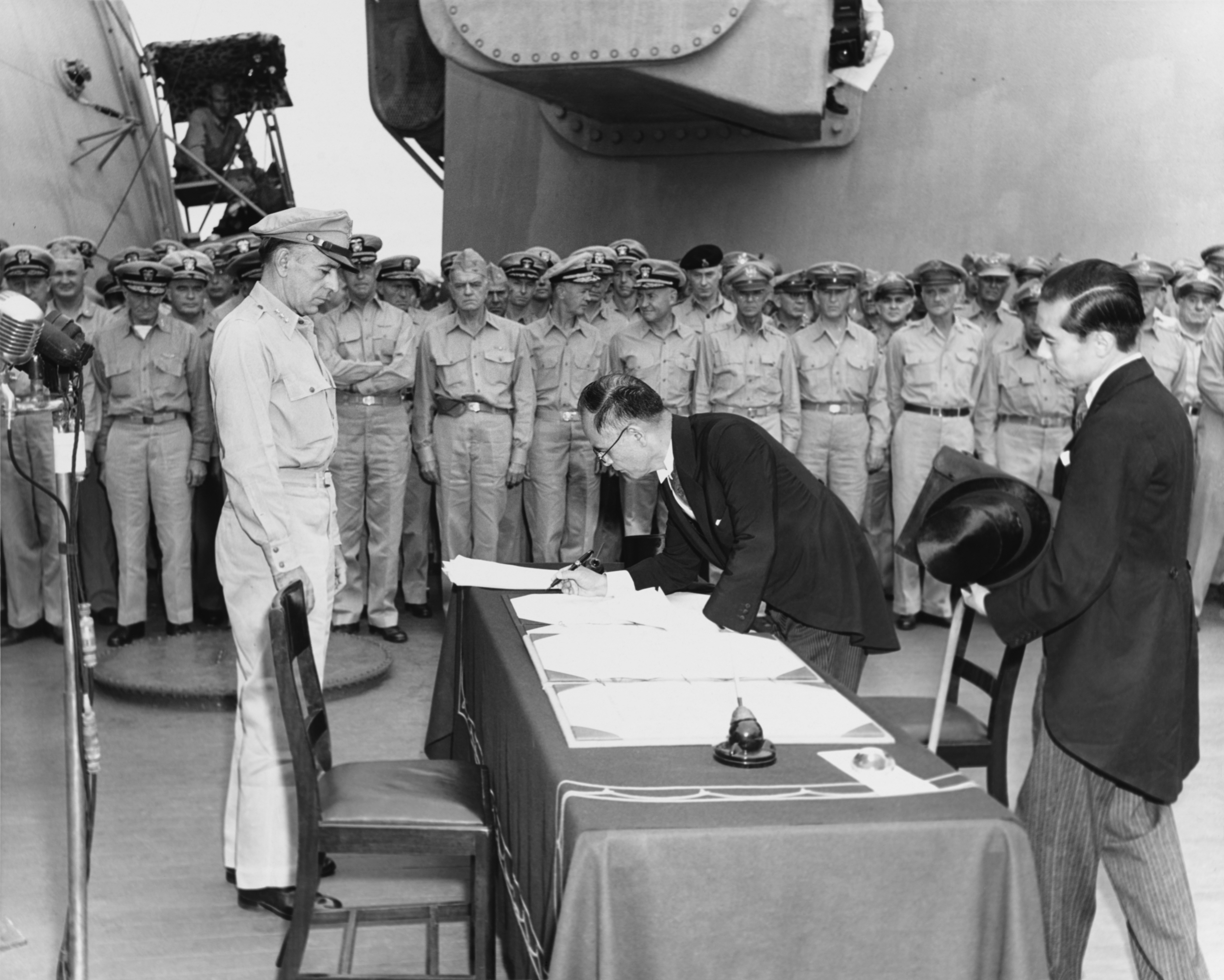
September 2, 1945: World War II officially ends with the final terms of surrender signed by the Empire of Japan

The following events occurred in September 1945:

== September 1, 1945 (Saturday) ==
- During the Chinese Civil War, the Xinghua Campaign ended in communist victory and the Battle of Dazhongji began.
- British colonial secretary Franklin Charles Gimson established a temporary government in Hong Kong.
- Born: Mustafa Balel, author, in Sivas, Turkey
- Died: Frank Craven, 70, American actor, playwright and screenwriter

== September 2, 1945 (Sunday) ==
- The Surrender of Japan became official when the Japanese Instrument of Surrender was signed aboard the battleship USS Missouri (BB-63) in Tokyo Bay. The Second World War ended after six years and one day.
- The Democratic Republic of Vietnam was proclaimed when revolutionary leader Ho Chi Minh declared independence from France.

== September 3, 1945 (Monday) ==
- General Tomoyuki Yamashita formally surrendered the remaining Japanese troops in the Philippines to United States Army General Jonathan M. Wainwright, the same commander who was compelled to surrender to Yamashita at Corregidor in 1942.
- Prime Minister of Liechtenstein Josef Hoop resigns under pressure from prince Franz Joseph II and is succeeded by Alexander Frick.

== September 4, 1945 (Tuesday) ==
- The Battle of Lingbi began as part of the Chinese Civil War.
- The Dominican Republic ratified the United Nations Charter.
- Emperor Hirohito personally opened a new session of the Japanese Diet with an appeal to his people to "win the confidence of the world" and "establish firmly a peaceful state."
- Born: Danny Gatton, guitarist, in Newburg, Maryland (d. 1994)

== September 5, 1945 (Wednesday) ==
- British troops landed at Singapore and took over without opposition.
- In China, the Battle of Lingbi ended in communist victory.
- Japanese American Iva Toguri D'Aquino was arrested in Yokohama on suspicion of being the wartime radio propagandist Tokyo Rose.
- Australian reporter Wilfred Burchett's story "The Atomic Plague – I Write This as a Warning to the World" appeared on the front page of the Daily Express newspaper in London, as the first dispatch from a Western reporter in Hiroshima.
- ZEEP, the first nuclear reactor both in Canada and outside the USA, went critical in Chalk River, Ontario.
- In an important early event of the Cold War, Igor Gouzenko, a cipher clerk for the Soviet Embassy to Canada, defected with 109 documents on Soviet espionage activities in the West. Gouzenko's defection would be kept secret from the public for five months, but it would force Prime Minister William Lyon Mackenzie King to call a Royal Commission to investigate espionage in Canada.
- Born: Al Stewart, singer-songwriter, in Glasgow, Scotland

== September 6, 1945 (Thursday) ==
- At Rabaul, the surrender of Japanese forces in southwest Asia was signed aboard the British aircraft carrier HMS Glory.
- Nicaragua ratified the United Nations Charter.
- Died: John S. McCain Sr., 61, U.S. Navy admiral

== September 7, 1945 (Friday) ==
- Berlin Victory Parade of 1945: The Allies held a victory parade in Berlin. The Soviet JS-3 heavy tank was displayed in public for the first time.
- Australia ratified the United Nations Charter.
- Born: Jacques Lemaire, ice hockey player and coach, in LaSalle, Quebec, Canada

== September 8, 1945 (Saturday) ==
- The Académie française expelled Philippe Pétain, Charles Maurras and Abel Bonnard for their collaboration with Germany.
- The Taixing Campaign began in China.
- Miss New York City Bess Myerson was crowned Miss America 1945.
- The Afghan government defeated a rebel force at Kunar Khas; Gerald Crichton, the British Charge de 'affairs in Kabul, described the victory as the “turning point” of the Afghan tribal revolts of 1944–1947.
- Born: Kelly Groucutt, bassist and co-lead vocalist of Electric Light Orchestra, in Coseley, England (d. 2009); Ron "Pigpen" McKernan, singer, organist and founding member of the Grateful Dead, in San Bruno, California (d. 1973); Rogie Vachon, ice hockey player, in Palmarolle, Quebec, Canada

== September 9, 1945 (Sunday) ==
- Japanese forces in Korea surrendered at Seoul.
- Japanese forces in China surrendered at Nanjing.
- American servicemen in Asia began returning home.
- The Japanese puppet state of Mengjiang was disestablished and replaced with the Inner Mongolian People's Republic.
- Dick Fowler of the Philadelphia Athletics pitched a 1-0 no-hitter against the St. Louis Browns.
- Born: Doug Ingle, organist, songwriter and lead vocalist of the rock band Iron Butterfly, in Omaha, Nebraska (d. 2024)

== September 10, 1945 (Monday) ==
- The Shangdang Campaign began in the Chinese Civil War.
- The Indonesian Navy was founded.
- The aircraft carrier USS Midway was commissioned into service.
- Born: José Feliciano, guitarist, singer and composer, in Lares, Puerto Rico

== September 11, 1945 (Tuesday) ==
- Japanese General Hideki Tojo attempted suicide when American troops arrived at his home to arrest him as a war criminal. Tojo shot himself below the heart with a revolver, but survived.
- A U.S. Senate resolution requesting a congressional probe of the Pearl Harbor attack was unanimously approved in the House of Representatives.
- Born: Franz Beckenbauer, footballer and manager, in Munich, Germany (d. 2024)

== September 12, 1945 (Wednesday) ==
- The Japanese surrender in Southeast Asia was concluded in Singapore.
- The Taixing Campaign ended in communist victory.
- Died: Hajime Sugiyama, 65, Japanese field marshal (suicide by revolver)

== September 13, 1945 (Thursday) ==
- The War in Vietnam (1945–1946) began.
- Chinese Civil War:
  - The Battle of Dazhongji ended in communist victory.
  - The Wudi Campaign began.
- The Valdostan Union, a new political party mainly representing the French-speaking minority in Aosta Valley, was founded in Italy.

== September 14, 1945 (Friday) ==
- The Belgian government announced that 17,000 troops would participate in the occupation of Germany.
- The Japanese garrison on Celebes surrendered at Manado.
- Strike wave of 1945-1946: The Ford Motor Company virtually stopped production in all its plants because unauthorized strikes had crippled output schedules.
- Born:
  - Martin Tyler, football commentator, in Chester, England
  - Thomas M. Holcomb, American politician and former member of the Michigan House of Representatives (d. 2024).

== September 15, 1945 (Saturday) ==
- Commemorative parades were held throughout Britain to celebrate the fifth anniversary of the RAF victory on Battle of Britain Day.
- The Homestead hurricane made landfall on Key Largo and then in southern Miami-Dade County, Florida. The hurricane killed 26 people and did $60 million in damage.
- The United States Office of War Information was dissolved.
- Born: Jessye Norman, opera singer and recitalist, in Augusta, Georgia (d. 2019)
- Died: Anton Webern, 61, Austrian composer (shot and killed by an American soldier)

== September 16, 1945 (Sunday) ==
- The Japanese garrison in Hong Kong surrendered.
- The first WAC Corporal dummy rocket was launched from White Sands Missile Range in New Mexico.
- A Victory Thanksgiving service was held in Westminster Abbey.
- Born: Pat Stevens, actress, in Linden, New Jersey (d. 2010)
- Died: John McCormack, 61, Irish tenor

== September 17, 1945 (Monday) ==
- Typhoon Ida made landfall near Makurazaki in Kagoshima Prefecture, Japan
- The Wudi Campaign ended in communist victory.
- The Belsen Trial began. Josef Kramer and 44 SS aides went on trial in British military court in Lüneburg on charges of conspiracy to commit murder in Nazi concentration camps.
- Born: Phil Jackson, basketball player, coach and executive, in Deer Lodge, Montana

== September 18, 1945 (Tuesday) ==
- The Battle of Xiangshuikou was fought as part of the Chinese Civil War, resulting in communist victory.
- Eisenacher Motorenwerk resumed production with the manufacturing of passenger cars mostly intended for the Soviet occupying power.
- 1,000 students walked out of Gary, Indiana public schools to protest racial integration.
- Born: John McAfee, British-American computer programmer and businessman, in Cinderford, Gloucestershire (d. 2021)

== September 19, 1945 (Wednesday) ==
- At the Old Bailey in London, William Joyce was sentenced to death for treason.
- British Prime Minister Clement Attlee made a worldwide broadcast promising independence for India "at the earliest possible date".
- New Zealand ratified the United Nations Charter.
- Kim Il Sung arrived at Port Wonsan and began to organize the Communist Party of Korea.
- Born: Randolph Mantooth, actor, in Sacramento, California

== September 20, 1945 (Thursday) ==
- The Allied Control Council in Germany passed Control Council Law No. 1 - Repealing of Nazi Laws.
- German rocket engineers captured at the end of the war and brought to the United States began work on the American rocket program.
- Born: Candy Spelling, author, television personality and philanthropist, née Carol Marer in Beverly Hills, California; Laurie Spiegel, composer of electronic music, in Chicago, Illinois
- Died: Jack Thayer, 50, American survivor of the sinking of the Titanic; Eduard Wirths, 36, German SS doctor (suicide by hanging while in British captivity)

== September 21, 1945 (Friday) ==
- The Battle of Rugao was fought during the Chinese Civil War, resulting in communist victory.
- Brazil ratified the United Nations Charter.
- Born: Shaw Clifton, 18th General of the Salvation Army, in Belfast, Northern Ireland (d. 2023); Kay Ryan, poet and educator, in San Jose, California

== September 22, 1945 (Saturday) ==
- The Huaiyin–Huai'an Campaign ended in communist victory.
- General George S. Patton complained in an interview that he had "never seen the necessity of the denazification program" and compared "this Nazi thing" to a "Democratic and Republican election fight."
- "Till the End of Time" by Perry Como hit #1 on the Billboard singles charts.

== September 23, 1945 (Sunday) ==
- The Egyptian government demanded that British forces withdraw from the Sudan prior to its incorporation with Egypt.
- So Well Remembered by James Hilton topped the New York Times Fiction Best Sellers list.
- Born: Paul Petersen, actor, singer, novelist and activist, in Glendale, California

== September 24, 1945 (Monday) ==
- Japanese Emperor Hirohito said that he did not want war and blamed Hideki Tojo for the attack on Pearl Harbor.
- Postwar anti-Jewish violence in Slovakia: Topoľčany pogrom in Czechoslovakia.
- Argentina ratified the United Nations Charter.
- Died: Hans Geiger, 62, German physicist

== September 25, 1945 (Tuesday) ==
- The Allied Commission declared the Nazi Party illegal.
- Born: Dee Dee Warwick, soul singer, in Newark, New Jersey (d. 2008)

== September 26, 1945 (Wednesday) ==
- The Japanese garrison surrendered the Andaman Islands to the Anglo-Indian sloop Narbada.
- The freedom of the English city of Aldershot was conferred on the Canadian Army, the first time any British community had presented its freedom to a complete visiting army.
- The U.S. State Department publicized a letter written by Franklin D. Roosevelt on March 10 saying that Spain could expect no help from the United States as long as Francisco Franco remained in power.
- El Salvador ratified the United Nations Charter.
- Born: Bryan Ferry, singer and songwriter, in Washington, Tyne and Wear, England
- Died: Béla Bartók, 64, Hungarian composer and pianist; A. Peter Dewey, 28, American soldier and the first U.S. fatality in French Indochina (killed by Viet Minh troops in a case of mistaken identity)

== September 27, 1945 (Thursday) ==
- Hirohito met General MacArthur in Tokyo.
- The neorealist drama film Rome, Open City premiered in Italy.
- Born: Jack Goldstein, artist, in Montreal, Quebec, Canada (d. 2003)

== September 28, 1945 (Friday) ==
- Anti-Dutch rioting took place in Indonesia.
- China and Turkey ratified the United Nations Charter.
- The drama film Mildred Pierce starring Joan Crawford, Jack Carson and Zachary Scott was released.

== September 29, 1945 (Saturday) ==
- The Weixian–Guangling–Nuanquan Campaign began in China.
- The Chicago Cubs clinched the National League pennant at Wrigley Field with a 4–3 victory over the Pittsburgh Pirates in the first game of a doubleheader.
- Born: Nadezhda Chizhova, Olympic gold medalist shot putter, in Usolye-Sibirskoye, USSR
- Died: George Van Haltren, 79, American baseball player

== September 30, 1945 (Sunday) ==
- The Bourne End rail crash killed 43 people in Bourne End, Hertfordshire, England when an overnight express train derailed due to driver error.
- The Medal "For the Victory over Japan" was established in the Soviet Union.
- The Detroit Tigers clinched the American League pennant in dramatic fashion on the last day of the season when Hank Greenberg hit a grand slam in the top of the ninth inning to give the Tigers a 6–3 win over the St. Louis Browns.
- The Black Rose by Thomas B. Costain topped the New York Times Fiction Best Sellers list.
- Born: Ehud Olmert, 12th Prime Minister of Israel, in Binyamina-Giv'at Ada, Mandatory Palestine
