= October 1945 =

Month of 1945

<<	October 1945					>>
Su	Mo	Tu	We	Th	Fr	Sa
	1	2	3	4	5	6
7	8	9	10	11	12	13
14	15	16	17	18	19	20
21	22	23	24	25	26	27
28	29	30	31

October 24: The United Nations is officially established

The following events occurred in October 1945:

== October 1, 1945 (Monday) ==
- Leopold III of Belgium arrived in Switzerland from Austria. That same day, a proclamation was issued to the Belgian people defending his actions during the war, saying that if he met with Hitler it was "only to better the lot of Belgian prisoners of war and obtain bread for your families."
- Born: Rod Carew, baseball player, in Gatún, Panama Canal Zone; Donny Hathaway, soul, jazz, blues and gospel musician, in Chicago, Illinois (d. 1979)

== October 2, 1945 (Tuesday) ==
- As a result of George S. Patton's controversial remarks about denazification, General Eisenhower's headquarters announced that Patton had been relieved as U.S. Third Army commander in Bavaria and made head of a unit compiling a military history of the war in Germany.
- United States Marshal for the Western District of Missouri Fred A. Canfil sent a gift to his friend, President Harry S. Truman: a painted glass sign mounted on a walnut base with the phrase "The Buck Stops Here!" Truman placed the sign on his desk and occasionally referred to it in public statements over the course of his presidency.
- Born: Don McLean, singer-songwriter, in New Rochelle, New York
- Died: William Sample, 47, American admiral (went missing on a flight near Wakayama, Japan)

== October 3, 1945 (Wednesday) ==
- The World Federation of Trade Unions was established to replace the International Federation of Trade Unions.
- The United Nations Executive Committee voted to recommend that the U.N. permanent headquarters be located in the United States, with San Francisco as the most preferred site.
- The Haitai company was founded in Korea.
- Born: Kay Baxter, bodybuilder, in Monroe County, Ohio (d. 1988); Viktor Saneyev, Olympic gold medalist triple jumper, in Sukhumi, Georgian SSR, Soviet Union (d. 2022)

== October 4, 1945 (Thursday) ==
- An unofficial dock strike began in Britain.
- The trial of Pierre Laval began in Paris.
- The comedy film Kiss and Tell starring Shirley Temple and Jerome Courtland was released.
- The comedy film Abbott and Costello in Hollywood starring Abbott and Costello was released.
- Born: Clifton Davis, actor, singer, songwriter and pastor, in Chicago, Illinois

== October 5, 1945 (Friday) ==
- Hollywood Black Friday: A six-month strike by set decorators represented by the Conference of Studio Unions (CSU) boiled over into a riot at the gates of Warner Brothers' studios in Burbank, California.
- Born: Brian Connolly, musician and actor, in Govanhill, Glasgow, Scotland (d. 1997)

== October 6, 1945 (Saturday) ==
- Curse of the Billy Goat: In Chicago, Billy Goat Tavern owner Billy Sianis was asked to leave Game 4 of the World Series at Wrigley Field because the odor of his pet goat Murphy was bothering other fans. According to baseball lore, Sianis placed a curse on the Cubs so they would never win the World Series again.
- Berita Film Indonesia was founded in Jakarta.
- Born: Ivan Graziani, singer-songwriter and guitarist, in Teramo, Italy (d. 1997)
- Died: Leonardo Conti, 45, Swiss-born Nazi and Reich Health Leader (suicide by hanging in his Nuremberg prison cell)

== October 7, 1945 (Sunday) ==
- The ocean liner SS Corfu docked at Southampton carrying the first 1,500 prisoners of war to return from the Far East.
- British reoccupation of the Andaman Islands from Japan begins after a delay due to shipping shortages.

== October 8, 1945 (Monday) ==
- Rudolf Hess was transferred from Britain to Nuremberg, Germany for trial.
- Parliamentary elections were held in Norway. The Labour Party led by Einar Gerhardsen won a majority.
- Attilio Piccirili, dies in New York City at 79

== October 9, 1945 (Tuesday) ==
- Pierre Laval was found guilty of plotting against the state and sharing intelligence with the enemy. He was sentenced to death and his property was ordered seized.
- Kijūrō Shidehara became Prime Minister of Japan.
- Typhoon Louise made landfall near Okinawa, Japan
- Denmark ratified the United Nations Charter.

== October 10, 1945 (Wednesday) ==
- British reoccupation of the Andaman Islands was complete.
- The Communist Party of Korea was founded. North Korea observes Party Foundation Day every October 10 as a national holiday.
- The Detroit Tigers defeated the Chicago Cubs 9-3 to win the World Series, four games to three.
- CBS conducted a successful experiment in color television when color images were sent between the Chrysler Building and CBS headquarters at Madison Avenue and 52nd Street.
- Died: Joseph Darnand, 48, French soldier and Waffen-SS officer (executed by firing squad for collaborating with the Nazis)
- The Nazi Party was formally abolished on 10 October 1945 by the Allied Control Council, and denazification began

== October 11, 1945 (Thursday) ==
- The Daughters of the American Revolution refused to allow Trinidadian-born pianist Hazel Scott to give a concert at Constitution Hall in Washington because of her race.
- Chile and the Philippines ratified the United Nations Charter.

== October 12, 1945 (Friday) ==
- German general Anton Dostler was sentenced to death in Rome for war crimes.
- The Supreme Court of Norway upheld the death sentence imposed on Vidkun Quisling.
- The Shangdang Campaign ended in communist victory.
- Born: Aurore Clément, actress, in Soissons, France; Dusty Rhodes, professional wrestler, as Virgil Runnels Jr. in Austin, Texas (d. 2015)

== October 13, 1945 (Saturday) ==
- The Christian Social Union in Bavaria was founded in Würzburg.
- Died: Milton S. Hershey, 88, American confectioner, philanthropist and founder of The Hershey Company

== October 14, 1945 (Sunday) ==
- The Indonesian People's Army declared war on the Netherlands.
- Hirohito formally dissolved the headquarters of the Japanese Imperial General Staff.
- Born: Lesley Joseph, British actress, in Finsbury Park, London

== October 15, 1945 (Monday) ==
- The 5th Pan-African Congress opened in Manchester, England. Over the next week 90 delegates discussed independence for African colonies.
- Cuba and Lebanon ratified the United Nations Charter.
- Born: Jim Palmer, baseball player, in New York City
- Died: Pierre Laval, 62, French politician (executed by firing squad for treason)

== October 16, 1945 (Tuesday) ==
- The Food and Agriculture Organization was established in Quebec City, Canada.
- Iran ratified the United Nations Charter.

== October 17, 1945 (Wednesday) ==
- In Argentina, deposed Vice President Juan Perón was released from prison in Martín García Island in response to a massive labour demonstration. October 17 was later commemorated in Argentina as Loyalty Day.
- Hirohito granted an amnesty to nearly one million Japanese as a step towards national unity.
- Iva Toguri D'Aquino, the most famous of the "Tokyo Rose" pro-Japanese English-speaking broadcasters of World War II, was arrested by Allied authorities.
- Luxembourg ratified the United Nations Charter.

== October 18, 1945 (Thursday) ==
- A coup in Venezuela overthrew President Isaías Medina Angarita.
- The Allied tribunal in Nuremberg formally charged 24 top Nazis including Hermann Göring, Rudolf Hess and Wilhelm Keitel with war crimes.
- The Battle of Houmajia was fought during the Chinese Civil War, resulting in communist victory.
- Saudi Arabia ratified the United Nations Charter.
- Born: Huell Howser, television personality, actor and voice artist, in Gallatin, Tennessee (d. 2013); Norio Wakamoto, voice actor, in Shimonoseki, Japan; Yıldo, talk show host, actor and athlete, in Konya, Turkey

== October 19, 1945 (Friday) ==
- Rómulo Betancourt became interim president of Venezuela.
- Charles de Gaulle signed an order introducing mandatory social insurance for all French employees.
- Syria ratified the United Nations Charter.
- Born: Angus Deaton, economist and Nobel laureate, in Edinburgh, Scotland; John Lithgow, actor, musician and author, in Rochester, New York
- Died: Plutarco Elías Calles, 68, President of Mexico from 1924 to 1928; N. C. Wyeth, 62, American artist and illustrator

== October 20, 1945 (Saturday) ==
- During the Indonesian National Revolution, the Battle of Ambarawa began between Indonesian and Dutch forces on Ambarawa.
- The United Kingdom ratified the United Nations Charter.
- An independence referendum was held in Mongolia. The vote was recorded as 100% in favor with 98.5% turnout.
- Born: George Wyner, actor, in Boston, Massachusetts

== October 21, 1945 (Sunday) ==
- Legislative elections were held in France to elect a Constituent Assembly to draft a constitution for a Fourth Republic. A three-party alliance of the French Communist Party, Popular Republican Movement and French Section of the Workers' International won a large majority. French women were allowed to vote for the first time. The election was accompanied by a constitutional referendum asking whether the new Assembly would serve as a Constituent Assembly, and whether the country would be governed according to a certain proposed set of laws until such time as a new constitution was approved. Both measures passed.
- General elections were held in Luxembourg, won by the Christian Social People's Party.
- Died: Henry Armetta, 57, Sicilian-born American actor

== October 22, 1945 (Monday) ==
- The Handan Campaign began during the Chinese Civil War.
- Egypt ratified the United Nations Charter.
- Born: Yvan Ponton, actor, commentator and television host, in Farnham, Quebec, Canada

== October 23, 1945 (Tuesday) ==
- Britain's new Chancellor of the Exchequer Hugh Dalton presented an interim budget that reduced taxes by almost £400 million but deferred other tax relief measures until the next financial year. "We must be resolute against inflation," Dalton said. "We must increase production of peacetime goods as rapidly as possible and be prepared to hold back purchasing power until there are enough goods to buy. The danger now is lest too much money should run after too few goods."
- The Brooklyn Dodgers signed Jackie Robinson to a minor league contract.
- Born: Kim Larsen, rock musician, in Copenhagen, Denmark (d. 2018)

== October 24, 1945 (Wednesday) ==
- The United Nations was established when the United Nations Charter came into effect at 4:50 p.m. EST, with ratification by the Soviet Union bringing the total number of signatories to 29.
- Czech President Eduard Benes signed a decree nationalizing commercial banks, insurance companies and 27 other industries.
- Born: Eugenie Scott, physical anthropologist, in the United States
- Died: Vidkun Quisling, 58, Norwegian military officer, collaborationist politician and head of the pro-Nazi puppet regime in Norway during World War II (executed by firing squad at Akershus Fortress in Oslo)

== October 25, 1945 (Thursday) ==
- Taiwan (Formosa) was returned to China after 50 years of Japanese rule.
- Charles de Gaulle commuted General Henri Dentz's death sentence for resisting the Allies in Syria to life imprisonment.
- Greece ratified the United Nations Charter.
- Born: Peter Ledger, commercial airbrush artist and illustrator, in Sydney, Australia (d. 1994); David Schramm, astrophysicist, in St. Louis, Missouri (d. 1997)
- Died: Robert Ley, 55, German Nazi politician (committed suicide by strangling while awaiting trial at Nuremberg for war crimes)

== October 26, 1945 (Friday) ==
- Communists and opposition members battled in the streets of Sofia, Bulgaria.
- In an interview published in the Atlantic Monthly, Albert Einstein said that the secret of the atomic bomb should be given to a world government with power over all military matters as a means of preventing nuclear war.
- Born: Pat Conroy, author, in Atlanta, Georgia (d. 2016)
- Died: Paul Pelliot, 67, French sinologist and Orientalist

== October 27, 1945 (Saturday) ==
- The Battle of Surabaya began as part of the Indonesian National Revolution.
- In Navy Day ceremonies in New York City, President Truman commissioned the new aircraft carrier USS Franklin D. Roosevelt and stated that American military strength would be used to maintain peace and establish "peaceful, democratic governments" in the former Axis countries.
- Born: Luiz Inácio Lula da Silva, President of Brazil from 2003 to 2011, in Caetés, Pernambuco, Brazil; Carrie Snodgrass, actress, in Barrington, Illinois (d. 2004)

== October 28, 1945 (Sunday) ==
- The Czechoslovak government ordered the confiscation of all German and Hungarian property in the country.
- An explosives magazine at Asnières-en-Bessin blew up and killed 41 people, including 30 German prisoners of war.
- Died: Gilbert Emery, 70, American actor

== October 29, 1945 (Monday) ==
- José Linhares became President of Brazil after Getúlio Vargas was deposed in a bloodless military coup.
- Japanese general Tomoyuki Yamashita went on trial for war crimes in a U.S. military court in Manila.
- Ballpoint pens first went on sale at Gimbels department store in New York.
- Born: Daniel Albright, literary critic and musicologist, in Chicago, Illinois (d. 2015); Melba Moore, singer, actress and entertainer, in New York City

== October 30, 1945 (Tuesday) ==
- Danish Folketing elections were held in Denmark. The Social Democratic Party remained the largest in the Folketing.
- India ratified the United Nations Charter.
- Born: Henry Winkler, actor and director, in Manhattan, New York

== October 31, 1945 (Wednesday) ==
- German church representatives became the first group of people permitted to freely travel in all four occupation zones.
- Peru ratified the United Nations Charter.
- The Alfred Hitchcock-directed psychological thriller film Spellbound starring Ingrid Bergman and Gregory Peck premiered in New York City.
- Born: Brian Doyle-Murray, American actor, comedian and screenwriter, in Evanston, Illinois
- Died: Henry Ainley, 66, English Shakespearean actor
