= Dai Bingnan =

Chinese general (1906–1949)

- 戴炳南
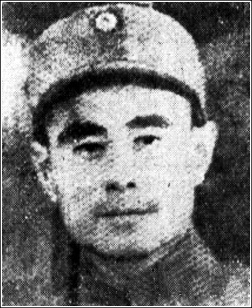
- Born: 4 December 1906; Jimo, Qingdao, China
- Died: 4 June 1949 (aged 42); Taiyuan, China
- Military career
- Allegiance: Republic of China
- Branch: (Republic of China (1912–1949)) National Revolutionary Army
- Rank: Lieutenant General (posthumously)
- Conflicts: Second Sino-Japanese War; Battle of Taierzhuang; Chinese Civil War; Taiyuan campaign

Dai Bingnan (Chinese: 戴炳南; pinyin: Dài Bǐngnán; Wade–Giles: Tai Ping-nan; 4 December 1906 – 4 June 1949) was a Chinese general from Jimo, Qingdao.

== Biography ==
Dai Bingnan was born on 4 December 1906, in Jimo, Qingdao. In 1922, he served as a soldier under Wu Peifu and later transferred to the National Revolutionary Army. During the Second Sino-Japanese War, he participated in battles such as the Pinghan Railway and the Battle of Taierzhuang. During the Battle of Niangziguan in 1937, he served as a battalion commander in Huang Qiaosong's brigade. In 1938, he was appointed commander of the 181st Regiment of the 91st Brigade, 31st Division, 30th Army, and participated in the Battle of Xuzhou. In April 1941, he entered the Central Training Corps. In June 1943, he was appointed major general and deputy divisional commander of the 30th Division, 30th Army.

== Chinese Civil War ==
In May 1946, Dai Bingnan became deputy brigade commander of the 30th Brigade, Reorganized 30th Division. In December 1947, he was appointed brigade commander of the 27th Brigade, Reorganized 30th Division. In September 1948, he became commander of the 27th Division, 30th Army. In early August 1948, the People’s Liberation Army encircled Taiyuan during the Taiyuan campaign. In mid-August, Chiang Kai-shek flew to Taiyuan and ordered Yan Xishan to defend the city at all costs. Later, in late August, Chiang Kai-shek had the Nationalist Army's 30th Army (commanded by Huang Qiaosong) airlifted from Xi'an to Taiyuan to reinforce Yan Xishan.

After arriving in Taiyuan, Huang Qiaosong was persuaded by letters from People's Liberation Army commanders, including Commander Xu Xiangqian and General Gao Shuxun, and decided to launch an uprising. On the morning of 3 November, Huang Qiaosong asked Dai Bingnan to enter Taiyuan, where they discussed the uprising plan with Tong Xuezeng, chief of staff of the Nationalist Army's 30th Army. After discussing the plan with Tong Xuezeng and others, Dai Bingnan went to Yan Xishan that evening and informed on them.

At around midnight that night, Huang Qiaosong was lured into a trap and arrested at the Taiyuan Pacification Headquarters by Yan Xishan. Subsequently, on 4 November, Yan Xishan's men arrested Jin Fu, chief of the Staff Section of the 8th Column of the North China First Corps of the People's Liberation Army, reconnaissance officer Zhai Xuyou, and Huang Qiaosong's liaison officer Wang Zhengzhong (then head of the intelligence unit of the Nationalist Army's 30th Army) at the defensive perimeter outside Taiyuan.

Afterward, Yan Xishan telegraphed Chiang Kai-shek, recommending that Dai Bingnan be promoted from division commander to commander of the 30th Army, and awarded him 30,000 yuan. He also arranged for Huang Qiaosong, Jin Fu, and others to be flown to Nanjing under guard. Huang Qiaosong, Jin Fu, and Wang Zhengzhong were subsequently executed at the Nanjing Military Prison on 27 November.

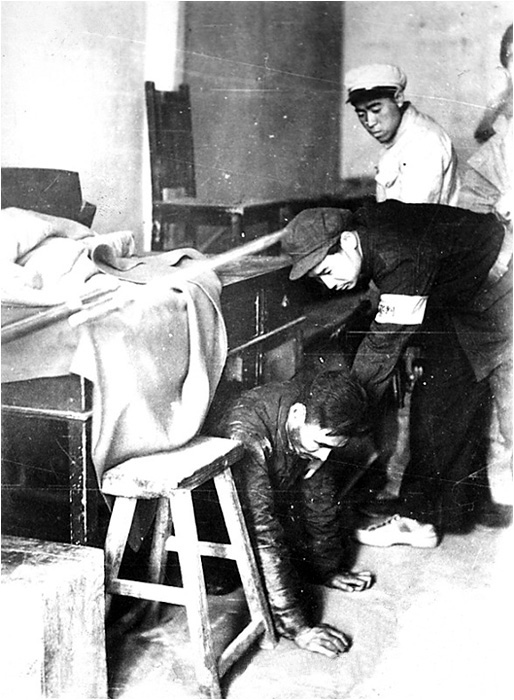
On 26 April 1949, Dai Bingnan was arrested at the home of his brother-in-law’s family, at No. 2 Yinyang Lane, Kaihua Temple, Taiyuan

On 29 April 1949, Yan Xishan fled Taiyuan by airplane. Seeing the situation, Dai Bingnan sought to find a place to hide by bribing local merchants. On 18 April, Dai spread a rumor that he had been killed by an artillery shell that day while directing the fighting. He subsequently had his family arrange an elaborate funeral for him, while he changed into civilian clothes and prepared to flee the city of Taiyuan.

On 24 April 1949, the People's Liberation Army captured Taiyuan. The Taiyuan Municipal Public Security Bureau immediately issued orders to search for and arrest Dai Bingnan. During a search of the prisoner-of-war camp, Dai Bingnan's personal attendant, Li Shijie, was identified. After being interrogated, Li Shijie disclosed Dai Bingnan's hiding place.

On April 26, Dai Bingnan was arrested. In July, a special court of the Taiyuan Municipal Military Control Commission held a public trial of Dai Bingnan, with Pei Lisheng serving as both presiding judge and chief judge. Dai Bingnan was sentenced to death and executed on 4 June 1949. Dai Bingnan was posthumously promoted to lieutenant general.
