= Handan Campaign =

Military campaign

- Part of Chinese Civil War
| Date | October 22, 1945 – November 2, 1945 |
| Location | Handan, Hebei, China |
| Result | Communist victory |

Belligerents
| National Revolutionary Army | Eighth Route Army |

Commanders and leaders
| (Republic of China (1912–1949)) Xue Yue (Republic of China (1912–1949)) Zhang Lingfu (Republic of China (1912–1949)) Gao Shuxun | Liu Bocheng; Deng Xiaoping; Gao Shuxun |

Strength
| 45,000 for the 1st echelon 100,000 for the 2nd echelon | 60,000 regular 100,000 militia |

Casualties and losses
| 3,000 killed 17,000 captured 10,000 defected | 4,708 total |

Handan Campaign (Chinese: 邯郸战役), also known as Pinghan Campaign (平汉战役), short for Beiping-Hankou Campaign (北平汉口战役), is one of the largest clashes between Communist and Kuomintang (KMT) forces immediately after the end of World War II. It resulted in Communist victory.

== Nationalist strategy ==
During the Shangdang Campaign, Communist units of the Shanxi-Hebei-Shandong-Henan Military Region succeeded in taking control over a 200 km section of the railway from Beijing to Hankou, and the adjacent regions along this section. The Kuomintang was determined to dislodge the Communists from their newly gained territory and planned an offensive that would significantly boost the KMT's bargaining chips in peace negotiations. Their plan aimed to bring the Communist-occupied territory in northern China firmly back under their control and secure passage to northeast China. The commander of the 40th Army, Ma Fawu, was also the commander-in-chief of the 11th War Zone, while the commander of the New 8th Army, Gao Shuxun, was also the deputy commander-in-chief of the 11th War Zone, and they were in charge of the entire operation.

The KMT deployed around 145,000 troops in two echelons. The first echelon was planned to strike northward from Xinxiang. It consisted of three armies divided from the 11th War Zone between two fronts: the left front consisted of the New 8th Army and the 30th Army, while the right front consisted of the 40th Army and the 9th Combat Engineering Regiment. The second echelon also consisted of two fronts. In the south, the 32nd Army of the 11th War Zone would follow the 40th Army to Anyang, and then would continue and linkup with the 3rd Army and the 16th Army of the 1st War Zone at Shijiazhuang. Once the three armies had joined their forces, they would continue push northward and linkup with the 92nd Army and 94th Army, which would strike southward from Beijing, where these two KMT armies had previously been airlifted into by the American Operation Beleaguer.

The New 8th Army was the most capable KMT unit and was thus tasked to bear the brunt of the fighting. However, this provoked resentment among the officers and soldiers of the New 8th Army. They had begun as a warlord army under the Guominjun clique and had later defected to Chiang Kai-shek. Since then, they had been under Chiang's direct control (rather than answering to a KMT-allied warlord clique, like many of Chiang's other forces). During the Second Sino-Japanese War, they had remained loyal to Chiang unlike many former warlord armies that defected to the Japanese. They felt that their loyalty was not being properly rewarded, and that they were being used as cannon fodder. Such resentment against Chiang and his regime was exploited to the maximum by the Communists in the latter stage of the Handan Campaign, resulting in their defection. This proved to be a significant factor that contributed to the KMT failure. To complete their plan, many Communist agents had already infiltrated the New 8th Army prior to the campaign.

== Communist strategy ==
The Communist plan was to concentrate a total of 60,000 regular troops from the 1st Column, the 2nd Column, the 3rd Column, and units of the Taihang (太行) Military Region, Hebei-Shandong-Henan Military Region, and Southern Hebei Military Region, along with 100,000 Communist militia. They planned to annihilate the KMT in the Fuyang (滏阳) region north the Zhang River and south of Handan. The strategy was to proceed in several phases:

First, Communist units would destroy railways from the north of Yellow River to Anyang, and harass the enemy and buy time. After the KMT has crossed the Zhang River, a Communist detachment would immediately take control the river crossing point and divide the KMT forces. The KMT units that had crossed the Zhang River would then be lured into the Fuyang region to be ambushed in a pre-selected spot. The ambush would be a pincer movement: the eastern pincer would consist of the 1st Column and units of Hebei-Shandong-Henan Military Region, while the western pincer would consist of the 2nd Column, 3rd Column, units from Taihang Military Region and Southern Hebei Military Region.

== Order of battle ==
Kuomintang order of battle 1st Echelon: 7 Divisions with 45,000 troops

- New 8th Army deployed at Xinxiang
- The 30th Army deployed at Xinxiang
- The 40th Army deployed at Xinxiang

2nd Echelon: 100,000 troops

- The 3rd Army deployed at Shijiazhuang
- The 16th Army deployed at Shijiazhuang
- The 32nd Army deployed at Anyang
- The 92nd Army deployed at Beijing
- The 94th Army deployed at Beijing

Communist order of battle 60,000 regulars:

- The 1st Column
- The 2nd Column
- The 3rd Column
- Units of Taihang Military Region
- Units of Hebei-Shandong-Henan (Jiluyu, 冀鲁豫) Military Region
- Units of Southern Hebei (Jinan, 冀南) Military Region

Another 100,000 militia

== First stage ==
The Kuomintang begun their push on October 14, 1945. By October 20, 1945, the KMT advance guards had occupied the positions at shore of Zhang River, providing cover to the troops building the bridges at the crossing point. On October 22, 1945, the KMT force crossed the Zhang River, where they were met head on with the Communist 1st Column deployed south of Handan, and the first shot of the campaign had been fired. By October 24, 1945, all three KMT armies had cross the Zhang River, and under the heavy artillery bombardment, the 106th Division of the KMT 40th Army assaulted the position of the 1st Brigade of the Communist 1st Column, succeeding in breaking through after a day of fierce fighting, penetrating the Communist defense at region between Cuiqu (崔曲), Jiati (夹堤), and by the evening, had successfully pushed to the Gaozhuang (高庄)—Nanpozi (南泊子) line. Unbeknown to the KMT force, the Communists were luring them into their trap, and northern group and the southern group had already begun to encircle the enemy from three directions: south of Handan, west of Ci County and east of Matouzhen (马头镇).

When the KMT force had reached Ci County and Matouzhen, the Communist encirclement was complete, while at the same time, the river crossing of Zhang River had also fallen into the Communist hands. Realizing that they were surrounded, the besieged KMT force retreated toward North and South Zuoliang (左良) and Cuiqu, and directly appealed to Chiang Kai-shek for help via radio. Chiang, in turn, ordered the entire second echelon to be mobilized to help the besieged first echelon. However, the KMT commanders of the second echelon were reluctant to help and unable to commit all of their forces. Instead, they only sent small detachments. On October 26, 1945, a portion of the KMT's 16th Army were sent from Shijiazhuang, but they were stopped by the Communist units of the Taihang Military Region and other local militia units at Gaoyi (高邑). Meanwhile, the KMT 32nd Army at Anyang sent out a detachment to reinforce their besieged comrade-in-arms, but this reinforcement from the south was also stopped by the Communist force at the Zhang River.

== Second stage ==
At dusk on October 28, 1945, the full-scale attack on the besieged KMT force begun. The Communist northern group targeted the KMT 40th Army while avoiding direct confrontation with the New 8th Army. By October 30, 1945, the 106th Division of the 40th Army was nearly wiped out, and the KMT's 30th Army was also badly mauled. Meanwhile, the Communist chief of staff Li Da personally went to the New 8th Army headquarters and convinced its commander Gao Shuxun to defect to the Communist side. The defection of their most capable fighting unit struck a devastating blow to KMT morale and worsened the situation for the remaining besieged units. Communist commander Liu Bocheng ordered the 1st Column and 3rd Column to open up the southern front and set a new trap along the road to lure out the besieged units from their strongholds.

On October 31, 1945, the KMT force attempted to escape thru the opening in the south exactly as Liu Bocheng had expected. Communist units of the Taihang Military Region and units of Hebei-Shandong-Henan Military Region stopped them at the northern shore of Zhang River. The KMT units were again besieged in the region along the line of the villages Qigan Zhang (旗杆漳), Xin Zhuang (辛庄), and Ma Ying (马营). On November 1, 1945, a detachment of the Communist 1st Column took the headquarters of the KMT 40th Army at Qigan Zhang, capturing the KMT commander-in-chief Ma Fawu alive. Kuomintang resistance ceased completely by the next day, while the KMT reinforcements on the road immediately withdraw back to their fortified positions behind the city walls upon hearing the news. The campaign ended on the November 2, 1945.

== Outcome ==
The Communist victory in the Handan Campaign reinforced their victory in the Shangdang Campaign, and strengthened the Communist position in the peace negotiations. It significantly slowed the KMT's deployment along the railway from Beijing to Hankou and thus provided cover for other Communist forces to seize northeast China.

=== Reasons for the Communist victory ===
The most obvious KMT mistake was Chiang Kai-shek's attempt to reduce the power of the warlord armies by using them to eradicate the Communists. This directly caused the New 8th Army to defect to the Communists. However, Chiang was faced with a dilemma: these troops earned their living by serving in the armed forces, and if they were discharged in peacetime, they would be forced to join the Communists for survival anyway when they were out of jobs, as they did later in northeast China.

The KMT also launched the offensive too early with insufficient strength. As Chiang had soon painfully realized, the Nationalist Government regime did not have enough resources to deploy its troops in a very short time span over the vast regions of China. When the surrounding countryside was dominated by the Communists, launching an offensive of the scale of Handan Campaign was overambitious. The KMT's second echelon failed to rescue their besieged comrade-in-arms because they were too far away, and the reinforcement sent by the 92nd and 94th Armies from Beijing did not even meet any enemy before the campaign was finished. They ignored Chiang's command to commit their full force, but they were already dangerously overstretched and overcommitting their forces risked letting the Communists seize the cities and destroy the KMT forces while they were on the road. Therefore, by disobeying Chiang's orders the commanders of the second echelon succeeded in preserving their forces. The successful preservation of the force, in turn, would later help the KMT buy time for troop deployment and strengthening their positions.

== See also ==
- Outline of the Chinese Civil War
- National Revolutionary Army
- History of the People's Liberation Army
