= Shang Chuan =

Chinese historian

- Born: November 1945; Baoding, Hebei, China
- Died: 26 December 2017 (aged 72); Beijing, China

Shang Chuan (Chinese: 商传; pinyin: Shāng Chuán; Wade–Giles: Shang Ch'uan November 1945 – 26 December 2017) was a Chinese historian of the Ming dynasty.

Born in 1945, Shang graduated in history from then Beijing Normal College. In 1981, he earned his master's degree from the Institute of History, Chinese Academy of Social Sciences, under Xie Guozhen's guidance. He concentrated on researching ancient politicians and ritual systems in his early days, but turned his attention to social and cultural history later. He was the president of the Chinese Society on Ming Dynasty History (2010–17) and a research fellow from the Institute of Archaeology, CASS.

Shang died in Beijing, on 26 December 2017, aged 72. His father, Hongkui, was also a well-known historian, whose speciality was the history of the Qing dynasty.
