= Gao Shuxun =

Chinese general (1897–1972)

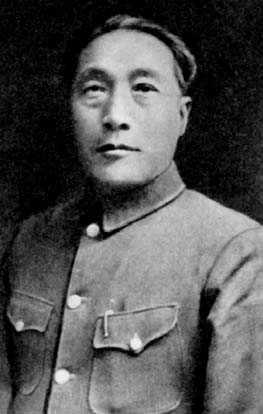
- Gao in 1945
- Native name: 高樹勛
- Born: 1897 Cangzhou, Zhili (now Hebei), Qing China
- Died: 19 January 1972 (aged 74–75) Beijing, China
- Allegiance: Republic of China (until 1945); People's Republic of China
- Branch: National Revolutionary Army
- Commands: 39th Army Group
- Conflicts: Central Plains War; Second Sino-Japanese War; Chinese Civil War; Handan Campaign

Gao Shuxun (simplified Chinese: 高树勋; traditional Chinese: 高樹勛; pinyin: Gāo Shùxūn; Wade–Giles: Kao Shu-hsun; 1897 – 19 January 1972) was a Chinese general from Zhili (now Hebei).

== Biography ==
Gao Shuxun was born in 1897 in Cangzhou, Zhili. In 1915, Gao became a soldier of the Beiyang government and was gradually promoted in the army led by Feng Yuxiang. In 1926, he was promoted to the commander of the Second Army of the National Revolutionary Army. In 1928, he led his army into Qinghai and surrendered Ma Qi, who dominated Qinghai. Later, he once acted as the chairman of the Qinghai provincial government. In 1930, during the Central Plains War, Gao fought against Chiang Kai-shek. After his defeat, Gao surrendered to Chiang and was appointed the 27th Division Commander of the 26th Route Army. In 1931, in the third encirclement of the Chinese Workers' and Peasants' Red Army in Jiangxi Province, he suddenly left the army and fled to Tianjin. Later, Gao secretly contacted the Chinese Communist Party (CCP). In 1933, Gao joined Feng Yuxiang to organize the Chahar People's Anti-Japanese Allied Army in Chahar and served as the second commander of the Chahar People's Anti-Japanese Allied Army. In 1937, after the outbreak of the Second Sino-Japanese War, Gao Shuxun served as the director of the Hebei Provincial Security Department and the general commander of the Hebei Guerrilla. In February 1939, he served as a member of the Chahar provincial government. In December 1940, due to his sworn brother Shi Yousan's attempt to surrender to the Japanese, Gao arrested him and buried him alive by Chiang Kai-shek's secret order. In January 1941, he was promoted to deputy commander-in-chief of the 39th Army. In May of the same year, he also served as the commander of the new 8th Army. Since then, he has served as commander-in-chief of the 39th Army Group, commander-in-chief of the Jicha Theater, and deputy commander of the 11th Theater.

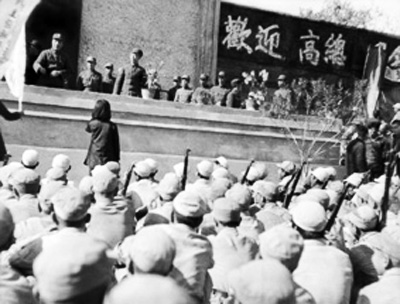
Gao Shuzun establishing the Democratic Founding Army at Wu'an, Hebei on November 10 1945.

After the end of the Second Sino-Japanese War, on 30 October, 1945, during the Handan Campaign, Gao Shuxun led the newly formed Eighth Army and the Hebei Civilian Army. The CCP Central Committee praised this. Soon, Mao Zedong launched the "Gao Shuxun Movement" to promote the Kuomintang army uprising, surrender, and accept the adaptation. On 10 November, 1945, Gao's Democratic Founding Army was established. Gao was appointed as the commander-in-chief of the Democratic Founding Army, Wang Dingnan was the director of the General Political Department, Fan Longzhang was the first army commander, and Qiao Mingli was the second army commander. On 13 November, 1945, with the approval of the CCP Central Committee Secretariat, introduced by Deng Xiaoping and Bo Yibo, Gao officially joined the CCP. After the establishment of the Democratic National Founding Army, the Jinji Luyu Military Region sent a batch of political work cadres to the Democratic National Founding Army to carry out political work, but these cadres were not happy with the general of the Democratic National Founding Army. On 14 June, 1947, the so-called "conspiracy riots" of the Democratic People's Republic of China were reported. On 15 June, 1947, Gao Shuxun was arrested and examined for the "conspiracy uprising" of the Democratic Founding Army, and the designation of the Democratic Founding Army was revoked. One year after the review, no evidence was found, and Gao Shuxun was appointed deputy commander of the North China Military Region. Later, after the 3rd Plenary Session of the 11th Central Committee of the Chinese Communist Party, the injustice of the so-called "conspiracy riot" by the Democratic People's Founding Army was finally vindicated.

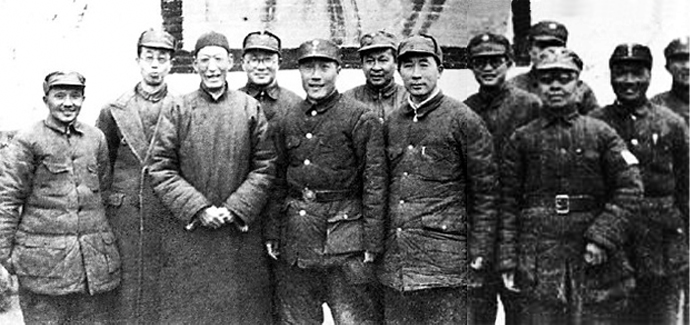
February 1946: Deng Xiaoping (far left), Liu Bocheng (4th from left), Bo Yibo (7th from left), Yang Xiufeng (2nd from left), Gao Shuxun (5th from left), Ma Fawu (3rd from left)

After the founding of the People's Republic of China, Gao Shuxun served as the Vice Chairman of the People's Government of Hebei Province, the Vice Governor of Hebei Province, the National People's Congress, the National Defense Committee of the People 's Republic of China, and the National Committee of the Chinese People 's Political Consultative Conference. On January 19, 1972, Gao Shuxun died in Beijing, at 76.
