= 1945 Beiping C-46 crash =

Aviation accident in China

Coordinates: 39°51′47.28″N 116°6′53.02″E

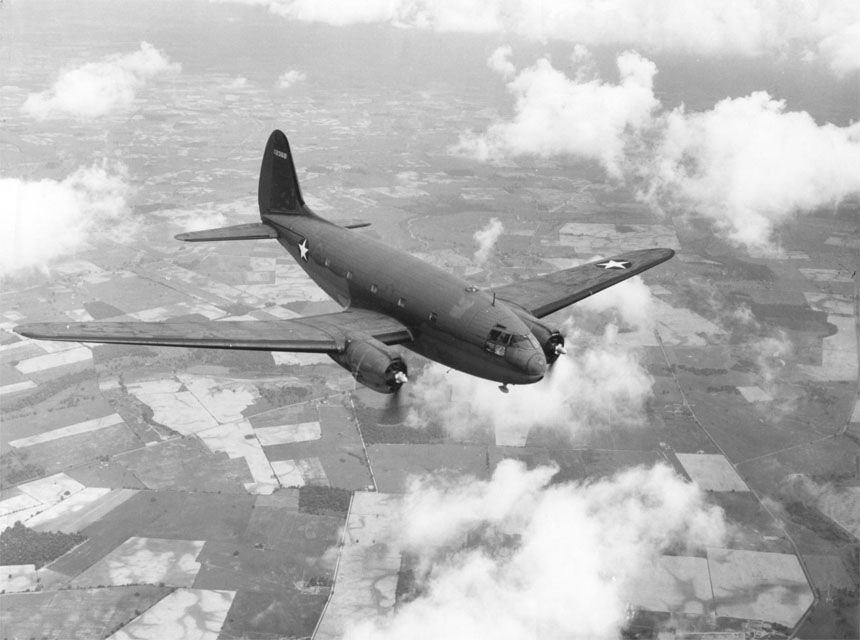
- A C-46 Commando similar to the accident aircraft

Accident
- Date: October 16, 1945
- Summary: Collision with radio antenna in poor visibility during approach
- Site: Near Beiping, Republic of China

Aircraft
- Aircraft type: Curtiss C-46F-1-CU Commando
- Operator: United States Army Air Forces
- Registration: 44-78591
- Flight origin: Hankou
- Destination: Nanyuan Airport, Beiping
- Occupants: 59
- Passengers: 55
- Crew: 4
- Fatalities: 59
- Survivors: 0

The 1945 Beiping C-46 crash was a fatal aviation accident involving a United States Army Air Forces (USAAF) Curtiss C-46 Commando that occurred on 16 October 1945 near Beiping (now Beijing), Republic of China. The aircraft was operating a military transport flight from Hankou to Nanyuan Airport when it crashed during its approach, killing all 59 people on board.

== Aircraft ==
The aircraft involved was a Curtiss C-46F-1-CU Commando, a twin-engine military transport aircraft manufactured in 1945. It carried the United States Army Air Forces serial number 44-78591 and manufacturer serial number (MSN) 22414. The C-46 was widely used during and immediately after World War II for cargo and personnel transport missions, particularly in the China-Burma-India theater.

== Accident ==
On 16 October 1945 at approximately 11:30 local time, the aircraft was approaching Nanyuan Airport following a flight from Hankou. During the descent, the crew encountered poor visibility, with low cloud cover reported at around 300 feet.

Approximately 25 kilometres northwest of the airport, the aircraft struck a radio antenna estimated to be about 300 metres tall and crashed into a field. All 59 occupants on board, including four crew members and 55 passengers, were killed in the accident.

The crash was attributed to controlled flight into terrain caused by poor visibility. Reports indicated that the flight crew were likely unaware of the presence of the antenna, as it was not marked on available navigation charts.
