= Peng Yubin =

Chinese general

Peng Yubin (Chinese: 彭毓斌; pinyin: Péng Yùbīn; also Peng Yu-pin; 1900 – 1945) was a Nationalist Chinese general.

== Military history ==
In 1936 Peng led the 1st Cavalry Division in the Suiyuan campaign.

In 1940 he was made Commanding General of the 1st Provisional Division.

In around September 1945, Peng Yubin lead the 23rd Army, the 83rd Army and other divisions totalling more than 20,000 men in the Shangdang Campaign. His force was ambushed and destroyed in October 1945 and Peng was killed at Siting.

== Sources ==
Guo Rugui, editor-in-chief Huang Yuzhang (2005-07-01). 中国抗日战争正面战场作战记 (China's Anti-Japanese War Combat Operations). Jiangsu People's Publishing House. ISBN 7-214-03034-9. Archived from the original on 2009-01-16.
