= Taixing Campaign =

1945 military campaign

- Part of Chinese Civil War
Date	September 8, 1945 – September 12, 1945
Location	Jiangsu, China
Result	Communist victory

Belligerents
Flag of the National Revolutionary Army National Revolutionary Army	PLA Chinese Red Army

Commanders and leaders
Cai Xinyuan	Unknown

Strength
6,500	>10,000

Casualties and losses
2,000+ killed 4,000+ captured alive	Unknown

Taixing Campaign (泰兴战役) was a series of battles fought in the Taixing (泰兴) region in central Jiangsu, and was a clash between the Communists and former Nationalists who fought for the Japanese puppet regime and rejoined the Nationalists after World War II. The campaign was part of the Chinese Civil War in the immediate post–World War II era and resulted in a Communist victory.

== Order of battle ==
Nationalists

- Temporarily Organized 19th Division of the 2nd Army

Communists

- Units of Central Jiangsu Military Region
- Local militias

== Campaign ==
On September 8, 1945, units of communist Central Jiangsu Military Region assisted by local militias decided to take the town of Taixing (泰兴) in central Jiangsu by force after learning that the local defenders consisted of former Nationalists turned Japanese puppet regime force who rejoined the Nationalists after World War II and refused to surrender. Three days later all Nationalist strongholds outside the town had fallen into Communist hands. On the night of September 11 the Communists launched assaults on the town itself, and by 8:00 a.m. Communist forces secured the town after capturing more than 4000 defenders, including the commander, Cai Xinyuan (蔡鑫元). In addition, the Communists captured 12 artillery pieces, over 140 machine guns and more than 2,700 firearms.

== See also ==
- Outline of the Chinese Civil War
- National Revolutionary Army
- History of the People's Liberation Army
