= Wudi Campaign =

Chinese military campaign

- Part of Chinese Civil War
Date	September 13, 1945 – September 17, 1945
Location	Northern Shandong, China
Result	Communist victory

Belligerents
National Revolutionary Army	People's Liberation Army

Commanders and leaders
Zhang Ziliang	Yang Guofu

Strength
6,000	60,000

Casualties and losses
6,000	Unknown

The Wudi Campaign (无棣战役) was a campaign fought in Wudi County in northern Shandong, and it was a clash between the communists and the former nationalists turned Japanese puppet regime force who rejoined the nationalists after World War II. The battle was one of the battles of the Chinese Civil War in the immediate post World War II era, and resulted in communist victory.

== Background ==
Like other similar clashes immediately after the end of World War II between the communists and the nationalists in China, this conflict also rooted from the fact that Chiang Kai-shek had realized that his nationalist regime simply had neither the sufficient troops nor enough transportation assets to deploy his troops into the Japanese-occupied regions of China. Unwilling to let the communists who had already dominated most of the rural regions in China to further expand their territories by accepting the Japanese surrender and thus would consequently control the Japanese occupied regions, Chiang Kai-shek ordered the Japanese and their turncoat Chinese puppet regime not to surrender to the communists and kept their fighting capabilities to "maintain order" in the Japanese occupied regions, fighting off the communists as necessary, until the final arrivals and completion of the deployment of the nationalist troops. As a result, most members of the Japanese puppet regimes and their military forces rejoined the nationalists.

However, most of these former nationalists turned Japanese puppet regime forces were not from Chiang Kai-shek's own clique, but instead, they were mainly consisted of troops of warlords who were only nominally under the Chiang Kai-shek's before World War II, since they were nationalists in name only and mostly maintained their independent and semi-independent status. These warlords were only interested in keeping their own power and defected to the Japanese side when Japanese invaders offered to let them keep their power in exchange for their collaborations. After World War II, these forces of former Japanese puppet regimes once again returned to the nationalist camp for the same reason they defected to the Japanese invaders. Obviously, it was difficult for Chiang to immediately get rid of these warlords for good as soon as they surrendered to Chiang and rejoined nationalists, because such move would alienate other factions within the nationalist ranks, and these former Japanese puppet regime's warlords could still help the nationalists to gain more territories by holding on to what was under their control until Chiang completed the deployment of his own troops to take over. Chiang Kai-shek's objective was to simultaneously solve the warlord problem that had plagued China for so long and the problem of the extermination of communism together, which proved to be an extremely fatal mistake for him and his nationalist regime later on, as shown in this conflict.

== Nationalist strategy ==
In accordance with his strategy to simultaneously solve the warlord problem that had plagued China for so long and the problem of the extermination of communism together, Chiang Kai-shek and his followers had hoped that these former Japanese puppet regime's warlords who rejoined the nationalists would be able to hold on to the regions long enough for Chiang to deploy his own troops by holding off communists. If the communists were victorious in such conflicts, however, the result would still benefit to Chiang and China because the power of these warlords would be reduced as their military forces were smashed by the communists, and the warlord problem plagued China for so long could thus be greatly reduced, while at the same time, communists would be weakened by the fights and Chiang's own troops would have easier time to take control.

For the former nationalist turned Japanese puppet regime forces, these warlords and their troops had no problem of following Chiang Kai-shek's orders, and they were eager to prove themselves. These warlords and their troops were well aware that due to the collaboration with the Japanese invaders during the Second Sino-Japanese War, they were well hated by the general population in China, including those nationalists who refused to surrender to the enemy and fought the enemy until the eventual victory. Therefore, in the impending demilitarization after World War II, they would certainly be disarmed and discharged, which would probably be the best outcome and the power of these warlord would be reduced or even eliminated as a result. Chiang Kai-shek's ordering them not surrendering to the communists and fighting off the communists was a savior for them because by carrying out such orders, these warlords and their troops could legitimize themselves and thus retain their power by fighting the communists who were targeted as rebels by Chiang Kai-shek and his nationalist regime.

== Communist strategy ==
The communist strategy was much simpler than that of the nationalists because there was not any huge division within the communist rank like that of the nationalist. The communists already earned considerable popular support by being the only Chinese force left in the region fighting the Japanese invaders and their puppet regime after the nationalist withdrew, and after successfully establishing communist bases in the rural regions where better life was provided to the general populace in comparison to that of Japanese occupied regions, the general Chinese populace agreed that the communists were well deserved to represent the China to accept the invaders' surrender in the region and takeover the regions occupied by the invaders.

== Prelude ==
In, 1945, the communist decided to take Shanxi by force after the local defenders consisted of former nationalists turned Japanese puppet regime force who rejoined the nationalists after World War II refused to surrender. By August 30, 1945, Zouping (邹平) and Qingcheng (青城) fell into the communist hands. By early September, 1945, other counties including Huimin (惠民), Jiyang (济阳), Qidong (齐东), Yanshan (盐山), and Ningjin (宁津) fell in a domino effect. On September 10, 1945, the communists succeeded in completely annihilating the four thousand strong Japanese puppet regime force headed by Cheng Jianji (成建基), thus the nationalists at Wuli was completely isolated when their last ally they would turn for help was destroyed. Both sides realized the inevitable final showdown and prepared accordingly.

Nationalist defenders of Wuli first strengthened their defense by further fortifying the positions. The city wall was widened to six to seven meters and its height was increased to eighteen meters. Watchtowers with height of twenty meters were constructed and serve as machine gun positions. A ditch five meters deep and twenty five meters wide surrounding the city was filled with water. In addition to other obstacles, numerous bunkers were also constructed in the positions outside the city wall. Inside the city, the nationalists also built four large bunkers with diameter greater than twenty meters. The 30 meter-high Haifeng (海丰) Pagoda to the southeast of the city was built in the Tang dynasty and it was used a machine gun position, which covers several villages surrounding the pagoda. The nationalist commander was confident on the defense of the city and he postulated that the communist enemy would not succeed in breaching the defense.

On August 6, 1945 (lunar calendar), communist commander Yang Guofu (杨国夫) gave the order to take the city of Wuli. By September 11, 1945, communist regular force from the 1st and 4th Military Sub-region of the communist Bohai Military Region had reached their assigned destination. The communist regular troops were assisted by over three thousand communist militias from Wuli (无棣), Yangxin (阳信), Zhanhua (沾化), and Qingyun (庆云) counties. The communists begun to dig a deep ditch of more than fifty kilometers long to isolate the city. On September 12, 1945, communist Specialized Battalion of the Bohai Military Region approached nationalist position at Tianqi (天齐) Temple before dawn, and planned to sever the communication line between Chengkou (埕口) and Yangxin (阳信), thus preventing any nationalist force from reinforcing the besieged city. The communist scout suddenly reported that there was a group of nationalist soldiers at the Lesser Ma Family Village (Xiaomajiacun, 小马家村) 1.5 km away. Song Jialie (宋家烈), the commander of the communist vanguard, the 3rd Company of the Specialized Battalion of the Bohai Military Region decided to immediately capture these nationalists before the sunrise, and the communists only had an hour to do so. The nationalist troops were caught completely off guard, and all of them were captured while in their sleep. It was soon revealed that in the afternoon on the previous day, the nationalist commander-in-chief was still claiming that within 150 km of the city, there was not a single communist troop in the area. The capture of the nationalist troops at the Lesser Ma Family Village (Xiaomajiacun, 小马家村) severed the communication link of the nationalist outpost at Tianqi (天齐) Temple outside the city. By the early evening, the communist attack force had surrounded the city from three sides, east, west and south. Soon after, the communist Muslim squadron took Shisanli (石三里), threatened the northern flank of the city and the communist siege of the city was complete.

== Order of battle ==
Nationalist order of battle:

- The 10th Advancing Column of Hebei – Chahar War Zone with Zhang Ziliang (张子良) as the commander-in-chief, Feng Ligang (冯立刚) as the deputy commander-in-chief, and Ma Ruzhen (马振儒) as the chief of staff
  - 1st Squadron commanded by Zhang Huanan (张化南) stationed inside the city
  - 2nd Squadron commanded by Luo Jingyi (罗景奕) guarding the Eastern Pass (Dongguan, 东关)
  - 3rd Squadron commanded by Ai Chuansheng (艾传圣) guarding the Western Pass (Xiguan, 西关)
  - 4th Squadron commanded by Zhao Zhongshun (赵仲顺) guarding the Southeastern Pass (Dongnanguan, 东南关)
    - A detachment of 4th Squadron commanded by Mou Songshan (牟松山) guarding the Tianqi (天齐) Temple and Haifeng (海丰) Pagoda
  - 5th Squadron commanded by Cheng Huichuan (程汇川) guarding the Southern Pass (Nanguan, 南关)
  - 6th Squadron commanded by Zhang Guanting (张观亭) guarding the Southwestern Pass (Xinanguan, 西南关)
  - 7th Squadron commanded by Wu Zanxun (吴赞勋) guarding the Northern Pass (Beiguan, 北关)
  - General reserve commanded by Jiang Xuekong (姜学孔)
  - Bodyguard Group commanded by Gao Bingchen (高炳辰)

Communist order of battle:

- Specialized Regiment of the Bohai Military Region
- 24th Regiment of the 7th Division of the Bohai Military Region
- Regiment directly under the control of the Bohai Military Region
- Muslim Squadron (Regiment)
- 3,000 militia from Wuli (无棣), Yangxin (阳信), Zhanhua (沾化), and Qingyun (庆云) counties

== Battle at Southern Pass ==
On September 13, 1945, the nationalists simultaneously launched several assaults from the city in different directions, in an attempt to find out which was the main direction of the enemy's attack. Most of the nationalist probes were immediately beaten back, with an exception of a group of forty troops that ventured out from the city via the southern gate. The communists planned to ambush this group in the region to the west of the Greater Ma Family Village (Damajiacun, 大马家村), and captured these nationalist troops for intelligence gathering purposes. However, the communist plan did not proceed according to the original goal due to a fatal mistake made by nationalists themselves: as the nationalist force approached the communist positions, the nationalist artillery providing fire support fell short and the entire barrage totaling several dozen rounds landed on their own troops, killing most of them. Less than ten out of the original forty nationalist troops survived and quickly retreated back to the safety of the city wall. After this incident, the nationalist defenders never ventured out to actively engaged the enemy again.

Haifeng (海丰) Pagoda was sheltered by the important position at Tianqi (天齐) Temple, which must be taken before attacking the pagoda. Zhang Ziliang ordered his two trusted commanders, Zhao Zhongshun (赵仲顺) and Mou Songshan (牟松山) to guard this critical position. At 9:00 AM on September 14, 1945, communists began their assault on the nationalist position. The battle begun with a fierce artillery duel and under the cover of artillery bombardment, the communist Specialized Battalion of the Bohai Military Region spearheaded the attack. Meanwhile, over 300 nationalist troops counterattacked under the cover of their own artillery fire support. The nationalists were successful in checking the initial communist assault by attacking the advancing communist vanguards, but in doing so, all 300 troops were killed. The loss of manpower meant that there were not enough troops left to defend the position, which fell into the communist hands. Realizing the severity of losing the position, the nationalists sent out more troops to launch another round of counteroffensive in order to take back the lost position, which was held by the 3rd company of the communist Specialized Battalion of the Bohai Military Region. Over two hundred nationalist dare-to-die team members charged the communist positions but the numerically inferior communist enemy proved to be much tougher than expected. Song Jialie (宋家烈), the communist company commander charged into the nationalist crowd and opened up his submachine gun, killing everyone around him, and Xing Shanyi (邢义善) and Wang Jiushou (王久寿), the political commissar and the deputy political commissar of the communist 3rd company, led the entire company to charge into the nationalist crowd to fight in close quarter, effectively naturalizing the superior firepower advantage of the nationalist artillery. With communist reinforcement arriving, the entire nationalist counterattack force was thoroughly wiped out by the early morning of September 15, 1945. The nationalist defeat at the Tianqi Temple and Haifeng Pagoda cost the entire nationalist reserve deployed at Southern Pass (南关), which meant that in the struggle for the pass in the next phase of the campaign, the nationalist defenders of the pass had to rely on themselves.

The Southern Pass was an important position, losing which would mean that the entire southern gate of the town would be exposed under the direct fire of the attackers. In the morning of September 15, 1945, the specialized regiment and the regiment directly under the control of the communist Bohai Military Region attacked the Southern Pass and the ancient Haifeng Pagoda respectively. Under the intense artillery barrage, the communist assault teams approached and took nationalist positions one by one, bunker by bunker, and hand grenades became the most effective weapon in the fierce close quarter combat. The defenders could not check the communist onslaught and were forced to retreat back to the safety of the city wall under the command of the nationalist commander of the 5th Squadron, Cheng Huichuan. As the nationalist commander Zhang Ziliang learnt the news of the retreat, he was furious and ordered the defenders atop of the city wall to machinegun his retreating troops and had the drawbridge pulled up, in the hope of forcing the retreating force to turn back and fight. However, the plan did not work, instead of making a stand and fighting, the trapped retreating nationalist troops simply laid down their arms and surrendered to the pursuing enemy. At the same time, the Haifeng Pagoda also fell into the communist hands, and eventually, a total of five out of six passes were firmly in the communist hands. The nationalist commander Zhang Ziliang decided to hold on until the dark and then attempted to breakout. At night of September 15, 1945, Zhang Ziliang ordered his chief of staff, Ma Zhenru, to accompany his in his breakout attempt, and ordered one of his subordinate, Jiang Xuekong (姜学孔) to lead the vanguards of breakout. However, the nationalist vanguards were immediately intercepted by the waiting communists as soon as they ventured out the northern gate, and were forced to turn back.

== The conclusion ==
After the first attempt to break out had failed, Zhang Ziliang returned to his headquarters and asked his protégé Han Binghua (韩炳华), who was a famed fortuneteller, to predict the fate of the defenders. The resulting prediction of the fortuneteller was that the defenders' fate would be catastrophic. The nationalist chief of staff, Ma Zhenru, was present, and was shocked that his commander would resort to fortunetelling to decide their fate. Coincidentally, a loud thunder had just struck after the depressing result of the fortunetelling was revealed, and the nationalist commander lost his composure and repeatedly murmured the superstitious claim "celestial drum had sounded" in front of everyone, implying that the end was near. The news of what happened at the meeting traveled fast and the nationalist morale decayed rapidly. To compound the problem, the defenders also learnt that their commander had attempted to break out earlier without them, and were outraged. At 7:00 AM on September 16, 1945, a group of commanders headed by Cheng Huichuan went to headquarters to see Zhang Ziliang, and accused him of abandoning his men. Zhang Ziliang was in no position to deny the blame and was forced to declare that whoever abandoned his post would be shot, himself included. Afterward, Zhang Ziliang led his commander to inspect the nationalist positions but they were discovered by the communist sentry atop of the Haifeng Pagoda, who immediately opened fire on them. Zhang Ziliang immediately retreated back to the safety of his headquarters and assigned his deputy Feng Ligang to continue the inspection for him.

At 9:00 AM on September 16, 1945, Zhang Ziliang asked his chief of staff, Ma Zhenru, if the defenders could hold on until darkness and what were their options. The chief of staff answered that if the communists just slightly increase the intensity of their assault, the city would fall for sure, and suggest another attempt to break out. Zhang Ziliang immediately summoned Gao Bingchen, the commander of bodyguard group, to escort him to breakout westward from the northern gate. Zhang Ziliang hidden some gold and silver on himself, and took his concubine and third daughter with him. The three hundred-member-strong force went out the northern gate and was intercepted by the Independent Regiment of the communist 1st Military Sub-region around a quarter kilometer away from the gate. The vanguard of the communist Independent Regiment, the 1st platoon of the 3rd Company managed to infiltrate the nationalist line and communist machine gunner Li Xinzhang (李欣章) opened up his light machine gun on the nationalists and killed Zhang Ziliang and those around him. Zhang Ziliang's deputy, Feng Ligang attempted to organize the nationalist survivors to continue the fight, but the situation was helpless. By 7:30 PM on September 17, 1945, the campaign concluded with communist victory. Over five thousands nationalist troops were captured, including the highest-ranking survivor, the deputy commander Feng Ligang, while another thousand nationalists were killed, and the town of Wuli was firmly in the communist hands.

== Outcome ==
Like other similar clashes immediately after the end of World War II between the communists and the nationalists in China, this conflict also showed that Chiang Kai-shek's attempt to simultaneously solve the warlord problem that had plagued China for so long and the problem of the extermination of communism together proved to be a fatal mistake. Although the result of the campaign turned out exactly like Chiang Kai-shek and his subordinates had predicted, and consequently the power of the warlords in this region was indeed reduced as their military forces were smashed by the communists, so that the warlord problem plagued China for so long was thus reduced for this particular region, and Chiang Kai-shek's secondary objective was achieved here, any positive gains obtained by the nationalists were negated by the politic fallout. The reason was that this success of achieving the secondary objective came at a huge cost in nationalists' loss of popular support in this region formerly dominated by the Japanese, because the local population had already blamed nationalists for losing the regions to the Japanese invaders, while reassigning these former Japanese puppet regime forces as the nationalist forces to fight the communists, the only Chinese force left in the regions, only further alienated the local populace and strengthened the popular resentment to Chiang Kai-shek and his nationalist regime.

The communists did not have the dilemmas faced by the nationalists and enjoyed popular support, and thus was able to easily overwhelm their nationalist adversary, and thus achieving victory without much difficulty. Like other similar clashes immediately after the end of World War II between the communists and the nationalists in China, the political gain was much greater than the military one for the communists as result of this battle.

== See also ==
- Outline of the Chinese Civil War
- National Revolutionary Army
- History of the People's Liberation Army
