= Battle of Dazhongji =

1945 battle during the Chinese Civil War

- Part of the Chinese Civil War
Date	September 1–13, 1945
Location	Jiangsu, China
Result	Communist victory

Belligerents
National Revolutionary Army	New Fourth Army

Commanders and leaders
Gu Zhenzhi	Unknown

Strength
3,700	Unknown

Casualties and losses
3,700 casualties	Minor

The Battle of Dazhongji (大中集战斗) was fought in September 1945 between the nationalists and the communists during the Chinese Civil War in the immediate post-World War II era in Jiangsu, China and resulted in the communist victory.

== Prelude ==
Like other similar clashes immediately after the end of World War II between the communists and the nationalists in China, this conflict was due to the fact that Chiang Kai-shek had realized that his nationalist regime simply had neither the sufficient troops nor enough transportation assets to deploy into the Japanese-occupied regions of China.

Unwilling to let the communists, who had already dominated most of the rural regions in China to further expand their territories by accepting the Japanese surrender and thus would consequently control the Japanese occupied regions, Chiang Kai-shek ordered the Japanese and their turncoat Chinese puppet regime not to surrender to the communists. They were to “maintain order” in the Japanese occupied regions by fighting off the communists as necessary, until the final arrival and completion of the deployment of the nationalist troops. As a result, most members of the Japanese puppet regimes and their military forces rejoined the nationalists.

However, most of these former nationalists turned Japanese puppet regime forces were not from Chiang Kai-shek's own clique, but instead consisted mainly of warlords troops who were only nominally under the Chiang Kai-shek's before World War II, considering they were nationalists in name only and mostly maintained their independent and semi-independent status.

These warlords were only interested in keeping their own power and defected to the Japanese side when Japanese invaders offered to let them keep their power in exchange for their collaborations. After World War II, these forces of former Japanese puppet regimes once again returned to the nationalist camp for the same reason they defected to the Japanese invaders. Obviously, it was difficult for Chiang to immediately eliminate these warlords once they surrendered and rejoined the nationalists. Taking such action would risk alienating other factions within the nationalist ranks. Additionally, the former warlords of the Japanese puppet regime could still be of assistance to the nationalists in gaining more territories by retaining control over their current holdings. Chiang had to wait until he could deploy his own troops to take over those areas. Chiang Kai-shek's objective was to simultaneously solve the warlord problem that had plagued China for so long and the problem of the extermination of communism together, which proved to be an extremely fatal mistake for him and his nationalist regime later on, as shown in this conflict.

== Nationalist strategy ==
In accordance with his strategy to simultaneously solve the warlord problem that had plagued China for so long and the problem of the extermination of communism together, Chiang Kai-shek and his followers had hoped that these former Japanese puppet regime's warlords who rejoined the nationalists would be able to hold on to the regions long enough for Chiang to deploy his own troops by holding off communists. If the communists were victorious in such conflicts, however, the result would still benefit to Chiang and China because the power of these warlords would be reduced as their military forces were smashed by the communists, and the warlord problem plagued China for so long could thus be greatly reduced, while at the same time, communists would be weakened by the fights and Chiang's own troops would have easier time to take control.

For the former nationalist turned Japanese puppet regime forces, these warlords and their troops had no problem of following Chiang Kai-shek's orders, and they were eager to prove themselves. These warlords and their troops were well aware that due to the collaboration with the Japanese invaders during the Second Sino-Japanese War, they were well hated by the general population in China, including those nationalists who refused to surrender to the enemy and fought the enemy until the eventual victory. Therefore, in the impending demilitarization after World War II, they would certainly be disarmed and discharged, which would probably be the best outcome and the power of these warlord would be reduced or even completely eliminated as a result. Chiang Kai-shek's ordering them not surrendering to the communists and fighting off the communists was a savior for them because by carrying out such orders, these warlords and their troops could legitimize themselves and thus retain their power by fighting the communists who were targeted as rebels by Chiang Kai-shek and his nationalist regime.

== Communist Strategy ==
The communist strategy was much simpler than that of the nationalists because there were not any notable divisions within the communist ranks like that of the nationalists. The communists had considerable popular support by being the only Chinese force left in the region fighting the Japanese invaders and their puppet regime after the nationalists withdrew, and after successfully establishing communist bases in the rural regions where better life was provided to the general populace in comparison to that of Japanese occupied regions, the general Chinese populace agreed that the communists were well deserved to represent the Chinese to accept the invaders’ surrender in the region and takeover the regions occupied by the invaders.

== The Battle ==
After those former nationalist-turned Japanese puppet regime force had rejoined the nationalists after the end of World War II, they refused to surrender to the communists, the only Chinese force in the region according to Chiang Kai-shek's order. This had obvious led to numerous clashes with the communists and the local population that strongly supported the communists, and eventually the full scale battle between the two sides erupted in the beginning of September 1945.

The clashes was concentrated around the Great Central Village (Da Zhong Ji, 大中集), an important town of Dongtai, Jiangsu and the communist units of the New Fourth Army of the communist Central Jiangsu Military District first took the outposts outside the Great Central Village (Da Zhong Ji, 大中集), and finally launched the final assault on the town on 13 September 1945. After fierce battle, the town fell on the same day and the entire garrison, the nationalist 7th Brigade was completely annihilated, with majority of the troops killed, including the commander, Gu Zhenzhi (谷振之), while the surviving 1,500 were captured alive by the attacking enemy.

== Outcome ==
Like other similar clashes immediately after the end of World War II between the communists and the nationalists in China, this conflict also showed that Chiang Kai-shek's attempt to simultaneously solve the warlord problem that had plagued China for so long and the problem of the extermination of communism together proved to be a fatal mistake. Although the result of the campaign turned out exactly like Chiang Kai-shek and his subordinates had predicted, consequently the power of the warlords in this region was indeed reduced as their military forces were smashed by the communists. The warlord problem plagued China for so long was thus reduced for this particular region. Chiang Kai-shek's secondary objective was achieved here, and any positive gains obtained by the nationalists were negated by the politic fallout. The reason was that this success of achieving the secondary objective came at a huge cost in nationalists’ loss of popular support in this region formerly dominated by the Japanese. As the local population had already blamed nationalists for losing the regions to the Japanese invaders, while reassigning these former Japanese puppet regime forces as the nationalist forces to fight the communists, the only Chinese force left in the regions further alienated the local populace and strengthened the popular resentment to Chiang Kai-shek and his nationalist regime.

== See also ==
- Outline of the Chinese Civil War
- National Revolutionary Army
- History of the People's Liberation Army
