= Battle of Xiangshuikou =

Battle in the Chinese Civil War

- Part of the Chinese Civil War
| Date | September 18, 1945 |
| Location | Jiangsu, China |
| Result | Communist victory |

Belligerents
| Flag of the National Revolutionary Army National Revolutionary Army | PLA Chinese Red Army |

Commanders and leaders
| Xu Jitai | Unknown |

Strength
| 1,000 | 4,000 |

Casualties and losses
| 1,000 casualties | Minor |

The Battle of Xiangshuikou (Chinese: 响水口战斗) was fought between the nationalists and the communists in northern Jiangsu during the Chinese Civil War in the immediate post-World War II era, and resulted in a communist victory.

== Prelude ==
Like other similar clashes immediately after the end of World War II between the communists and the nationalists in China, this conflict also rooted from the fact that Chiang Kai-shek had realized that his nationalist regime simply had neither the sufficient troops nor enough transportation assets to deploy his troops into the Japanese-occupied regions of China. Unwilling to allow the communists, who had already dominated most of the rural regions in China, to further expand their territories by accepting the Japanese surrender and thus control the Japanese-occupied regions, Chiang Kai-shek ordered the Japanese and their turncoat Chinese puppet regime not to surrender to the communists and keep their fighting capabilities to “maintain order” in the Japanese-occupied regions, fighting off the communists as necessary, until the final arrivals and completion of the deployment of the nationalist troops. As a result, most members of the Japanese puppet regimes and their military forces rejoined the nationalists.

Many of the former Nationalist troops who served in Japanese-backed collaborationist forces during World War II had previously belonged to regional warlord armies rather than forces directly controlled by Chiang Kai-shek. Although nominally affiliated with the Nationalist government, these regional commanders had retained considerable military and political autonomy. Some subsequently joined Japanese-backed administrations while maintaining control over their existing forces and territories.

Following Japan's surrender in 1945, a number of these commanders rejoined the Nationalist forces. Their reintegration presented difficulties for Chiang's government, which sought to consolidate military authority while continuing its conflict with the Chinese Communist Party. The Nationalists also relied on some former collaborationist forces to maintain control of territories pending the arrival of regular Nationalist troops. These arrangements reflected the continuing influence of regional military commanders during the renewed Chinese Civil War.

== Nationalist strategy ==
In accordance with his strategy to simultaneously solve the warlord problem that had plagued China for so long and the problem of the extermination of communism together, Chiang Kai-shek and his followers had hoped that these former Japanese puppet regime's warlords who rejoined the nationalists would be able to hold on to the regions long enough for Chiang to deploy his own troops by holding off communists. If the communists were victorious in such conflicts, however, the result would still benefit to Chiang and China because the power of these warlords would be reduced as their military forces were smashed by the communists, and the warlord problem plagued China for so long could thus be greatly reduced, while at the same time, communists would be weakened by the fights and Chiang's own troops would have easier time to take control.

For the former nationalist turned Japanese puppet regime forces, these warlords and their troops had no problem of following Chiang Kai-shek's orders, and they were eager to prove themselves. These warlords and their troops were well aware that due to the collaboration with the Japanese invaders during the Second Sino-Japanese War, they were well hated by the general population in China, including those nationalists who refused to surrender to the enemy and fought the enemy until the eventual victory. Therefore, in the impending demilitarization after World War II, they would certainly be disarmed and discharged, which would probably be the best outcome and the power of these warlords would be reduced or even eliminated as a result. Chiang Kai-shek's ordering them not surrendering to the communists and fighting off the communists was a savior for them because by carrying out such orders, these warlords and their troops could legitimize themselves and thus retain their power by fighting the communists who were targeted as rebels by Chiang Kai-shek and his nationalist regime.

== Communist strategy ==
The communist strategy was much simpler than that of the nationalists because there was not any huge division within the communist rank like in that of the nationalists. The communists had already earned considerable popular support by being the only Chinese force left in the region fighting the Japanese invaders and their puppet regime after the nationalists withdrew, and after successfully establishing communist bases in the rural regions where better life was provided to the general populace in comparison to that of Japanese occupied regions, the general Chinese populace agreed that the communists were well deserved to represent the China to accept the invaders’ surrender in the region and takeover the regions occupied by the invaders.

== Battle ==
On September 18, 1945, the 10th Brigade of the 3rd Division of the communist New Fourth Army with the help of local communist militia launched their assault in the Xiangshuikou (响水口) region of Jiangsu, China, after the nationalist garrison consisted of four battalions refused to surrender. The nationalist battalions were the former nationalists turned Japanese puppet regime force rejoined nationalist after World War II, and they were ordered by Chiang Kai-shek's regime to hold on the land they controlled, and not to surrender to the communists, and fight off communists if necessary until Chiang could deploy his own troops to the region. However, these units were no match for their longtime communist adversary, and just like previous battles during the Second Sino-Japanese War, they were easily defeated without popular support, with nearly all of the force totaling over a thousand being wiped out by the attacking enemy. As the few remaining survivors fled, they left behind important cities and town to the enemy, including Xiangshuikou (响水口), Chen Family's Port (Chen Jia Gang, 陈家港), Guanyun (灌云) and Guannan (灌南). The communist victory ensured their total control of the region along the Guan (灌) River, and the important cash generating salt production fields in northern Jiangsu.

== Outcome ==
Like other similar clashes immediately after the end of World War II between the communists and the nationalists in China, this conflict also showed that Chiang Kai-shek's attempt to simultaneously solve the warlord problem that had plagued China for so long and the problem of the extermination of communism together proved to be a fatal mistake. Although the result of the campaign turned out exactly like Chiang Kai-shek and his subordinates had predicted, and consequently the power of the warlords in this region was indeed reduced as their military forces were smashed by the communists, so that the warlord problem plagued China for so long was thus reduced for this particular region, and Chiang Kai-shek's secondary objective was achieved here, any positive gains obtained by the nationalists were negated by the politic fallout. The reason was that this success of achieving the secondary objective came at a huge cost in nationalists’ loss of popular support in this region formerly dominated by the Japanese, because the local population had already blamed nationalists for losing the regions to the Japanese invaders, while reassigning these former Japanese puppet regime forces as the nationalist forces to fight the communists, the only Chinese force left in the regions, only further alienated the local populace and strengthened the popular resentment to Chiang Kai-shek and his nationalist regime.

== See also ==
- Outline of the Chinese Civil War
- National Revolutionary Army
- History of the People's Liberation Army
