= Battle of Rugao =

1945 battle

- Part of the Chinese Civil War
Date	September 21, 1945
Location	Rugao, Jiangsu, China
Result	Communist victory

Belligerents
Flag of the National Revolutionary Army National Revolutionary Army	PLA New Fourth Army

Commanders and leaders
Kong Ruiwu	Unknown

Strength
3,000	Unknown

Casualties and losses
3,000	Minor

The Battle of Rugao (如皋战斗) was fought between the nationalists and the communists for the control of the town of Rugao, in Jiangsu Province, during the Chinese Civil War immediately after the World War II era and resulted in a communist victory.

== Background ==
Like similar clashes immediately after the end of World War II between the communists and the nationalists in China, the conflict rooted from the fact that Chiang Kai-shek had realized that his nationalist regime simply lacked the troops or the transportation to deploy his troops into the Japanese-occupied regions of China. Unwilling to let the communists, who already dominated most rural regions in China, to expand their territories by accepting the Japanese surrender to control the Japanese-occupied regions, Chiang ordered the Japanese and their turncoat Chinese puppet regime not to surrender to the communists but to keep their fighting capabilities to "maintain order" in the Japanese-occupied regions and to fight off the communists as necessary, until the final arrivals and completion of the deployment of the nationalist troops. As a result, most members of the Japanese puppet regime and their military forces rejoined the nationalists.

However, most of the former nationalists turned Japanese puppet regime forces were not from Chiang's own clique but were troops of warlords, who were only nominally under Chiang before the war since they were nationalists in name only and mostly maintained their independent and semi-independent status. The warlords wanted only their own power and defected to the Japanese invaders, who offered to let them keep power in exchange for collaboration. After the war, the forces of the Japanese puppet regime returned to the nationalists for the same reason they had defected to the Japanese invaders. It was difficult for Chiang to get rid of the warlords immediately as soon as they surrendered to Chiang and rejoined nationalists, which would alienate other factions within the nationalist ranks. The former Japanese puppet regime's warlords could still help the nationalists gain more territories by holding on to what was under their control until Chiang completed the deployment of his own troops to take over the regions.

== Nationalist strategy ==
Chiang's objective was to solve the warlord problem that had plagued China for so long and the problem of the communists together. In accordance with this strategy, Chiang Kai-shek and his followers had hoped that these former Japanese puppet regime's warlords who rejoined the nationalists would be able to hold on to the regions long enough for Chiang to deploy his own troops by holding off communistss. If the communists were victorious in such conflicts, however, the result would still benefit Chiang and China. The power of the warlords would be reduced as their military forces were smashed by the communists, the warlord problem that had plagued China for so long could be greatly reduced, and the communists would be weakened, so Chiang's own troops would more easily take control.

For the former nationalist forces that turned toward the Japanese puppet regime forces, the warlords and their troops had no problem following Chiang's orders, and they were eager to prove themselves. The warlords and their troops were well aware that their collaboration with the Japanese invaders during the Second Sino-Japanese War made them hated by the general population in China, including the nationalists who refused to surrender and fought the enemy until the eventual victory. Therefore, in the impending demilitarization after World War II, they would certainly be disarmed and discharged, and the power of the warlords would be reduced or even eliminated as a result. Chiang's orders not to surrender to the communists and to fight saved the warlords, whose troops could legitimize themselves and thus retain their power.

== Communist strategy ==
The communist strategy was much simpler than that of the nationalists because there was not a large division in the communist ranks, unlike for the nationalists. The communists had already earned considerable popular support by being the only Chinese force left in the region fighting the Japanese invaders and their puppet regime after the nationalists withdrew, and after successfully establishing communist bases in the rural regions, a better life was provided to the general populace than to that of Japanese-occupied regions. The general Chinese populace agreed that the communists deserved to represent China, to accept the invaders' surrender in the region, and to take over the regions occupied by the invaders.

== Battle ==
After the former nationalist forces that turned to the Japanese puppet regime and then rejoined the nationalists after World War II had refused to surrender to the communists, the only Chinese forces in the region were under the command of Chiang Kai-shek. A unit of the communist New Fourth Army, from the 4th Sub-Military Region of the communist Central Jiangsu Military Region, launched its offensive in Rugao, Jiangsu, China against those units. Unable to fend off the communist attack and without any popular support from the local populace, the entire nationalist Independent Brigade of the Second Front Army garrisoning Rugao, totaling more than 3,000, was completely annihilated. Everyone, including the commander Kong Ruiwu (孔瑞五) and the deputy com生) was either killed or captured alive. The communists also capture two mortars, 22 machine guns, and more than 2,600 other firearms.

== Aftermath ==
As in similar post-World War II clashes between the communists and the nationalists in China, the conflict showed that Chiang Kai-shek's attempt to solve simultaneously the warlord problem that had plagued China for so long and the problem of the extermination of communism proved fatal. The result of the campaign turned out exactly as Chiang and his subordinates had predicted, and consequently the power of the warlords in this region was indeed reduced as their military forces were smashed by the communists. The warlord problem was thus reduced for that particular region. But while Chiang's secondary objective was achieved, any gains obtained by the nationalists were negated by the political fallout. The success of achieving the secondary objective came at a huge cost in nationalists' loss of popular support in the region, which had been dominated by the Japanese, because the local population had already blamed nationalists for losing the regions to the Japanese invaders. It also reassigned the former Japanese puppet regime forces as the nationalist forces to fight the communists, the only Chinese force left in the regions, which further alienated the local populace and strengthened the popular resentment to Chiang's nationalist regime.

== See also ==
- Outline of the Chinese Civil War
- National Revolutionary Army
- History of the People's Liberation Army
