= Shangdang Campaign =

Series of battles in the Chinese Civil War (Sept-Oct 1945)

- Part of the Chinese Communist Revolution
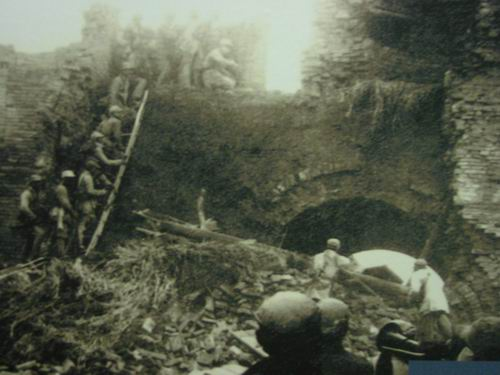
Date	10 September 1945 –12 October 1945
Location	Shanxi Province, Republic of China
Result	Communist victory

Belligerents
Nationalist government: Shanxi clique	Chinese Communist Party

Commanders and leaders
Yan Xishan	Liu Bocheng; Deng Xiaoping

Units involved
National Revolutionary Army Ground Forces	Eighth Route Army

Strength
~35,000	~80,000

Casualties and losses
35,000, most of them captured	4,708 killed

The Shangdang Campaign (simplified Chinese: 上党战役; traditional Chinese: 上黨戰役) was a series of battles fought between Eighth Route Army troops led by Liu Bocheng and Kuomintang troops led by Yan Xishan (aka Jin clique) in what is now Shanxi Province, China. The campaign lasted from 10 September 1945, through 12 October 1945. Like all other Chinese Communist victories in the clashes immediately after Imperial Japan's surrender in World War II, the outcome of this campaign altered the course of the peace negotiation held in Chongqing from 28 August 1945, through 11 October 1945, resulting in a more favourable outcome for Mao Zedong and the party.

== Prelude ==
After the end of World War II, the conflict between the Chinese Communist Party and the Kuomintang resumed the intensity that it had had before the outbreak of the Second Sino-Japanese War (Second United Front). Under the direction of Chiang Kai-shek, the commander-in-chief of the second war zone, Yan Xishan, ordered the commander of the 19th Army, Shi Zebo (史泽波), to lead the 19th Army, part of the 61st Army, and other units, totaling more than 17,000 to invade the Communist base in the Shangdang (上党) region of southeastern Shanxi in mid-August 1945. Three Nationalist divisions were stationed in the largest city of the region, Changzhi, while the rest were stationed in the following cities/towns: Xiangyuan (襄垣), Changzi (长子), Tunliu (屯留), Lucheng, Huguang (壶关), and other counties; and, from these newly established bases, the Nationalists planned to take the entire southeastern Shanxi region from the Communists. The Communists anticipated the Nationalist attack and mobilized 31,000 troops from the Taihang (太行), Taiyue (太岳), and Southern Hebei (冀南) military districts to prepare for the upcoming battles.

The communist commander Liu Bocheng was assisted by his political commissar Deng Xiaoping, who was excellent at motivating the soldiers. Many Chinese communist troops worried about the safety of Mao Zedong, who was in Chongqing negotiating a peace treaty with Chiang Kai-shek. Deng Xiaoping told the soldiers that the greater the victory for the upcoming battle, the safer Mao Zedong would be, and the stronger the position the communists would have at the negotiations. This did indeed raised the morale of the Communist troops in Shanxi. The communists also mobilized an additional 50,000 militia to ease logistical concerns associated with the campaign, and to fill vacancies left behind by the regular troops who were on the front lines.

== First stage ==
The campaign officially started on 10 September 1945, when the first shot of the first battle was fired. The Chinese communists Taihang column first attacked Tunliu, while Taiyue (太岳) and Southern Hebei columns prepared for an ambush. One day later, the Taihang column entered a skirmish with the 6,000 Nationalist troops from Changzhi, but the Nationalist commander was extremely careful; and, once contact with the communist force was made, the Nationalist unit immediately withdrew back to Changzhi. Although the communists' ambush failed, they did take the town of Tunliu on 12 September 1945. On 13 September 1945, the Chinese communists used the same tactics again, with the Taihang column attacking Changzi (长子), while the Taiyue (太岳) and Southern Hebei columns prepared for another ambush. However, the Nationalist commander Shi Zebo anticipated the communists' ambush, and did not send out any reinforcements from Changzhi.

Realizing that their original plan would not be successful, Liu Bocheng and Deng Xiaoping promptly changed their strategy from decimating the nationalist force to retaking lost territory, taking Xiangyuan, Changzi, Tunli, Lucheng, Huguang and other counties by 19 September 1945, annihilating over 7,000 Nationalist troops in the process. The next day, communist forces attacked garrisons outside of Changzhi from the south, east and west. The communists planned to let the Nationalists escape to the north and ambush them while they were fleeing. Again, the communist plan failed to materialize when Nationalist commander Shi Zebo, still at Changzhi, again anticipated the ambush and decided to hold out. When the attack on Changzhi began on 24 September 1945, but the communists failed to take the city (attributed largely to the superior arms of the Nationalist defenders). A stalemate was reached following the successful defense of Changzhi.

== Second stage ==
After Yan Xishan learned of the emergency facing Shi Zebo at Changzhi, he sent out reinforcements led by the deputy commander-in-chief of the 2nd Army Group, Peng Yubin (彭毓斌). Peng's units consisted of the 23rd Army, the 83rd Army, and other divisions totalling more than 20,000 men. Learning these troop movements on 28 September 1945, the communists planned an ambush in the area between Tunliu and Xianghuan, leaving the Southern Hebei column and local militia to maintain the siege of Changzhi, while redeploying Taihang and Taiyue columns to the north.

On 2 October 1945, the Nationalist reinforcements clashed with the ambushing communist forces at a region northwest of Tunliu known as "Wangjiaqu" (王家渠). After the initial battle, the Nationalist reinforcements were engaged at regions along Laoyeling (老爷岭), Mopannao (磨盘脑), and Yulin (榆林) line. The Nationalists maintained a tight formation, making communication more efficient due to the shorter distance between units. The Nationalists benefitted from superior equipment, and effectively concentrated their superior firepower to inflict heavy casualties on the attacking communist force. The Communists were forced to redeploy the Southern Hebei column for reinforcement, leaving only the local militia to besiege Changzhi. The Communists changed tactics, attacking from 3 sides while leaving the north side open so that the enemy would escape to the north and be ambushed on the way. This tactic proved successful when, on 5 October 1945, Peng Yubin scaped to the north exactly as the Communists had hoped. His force was soon defeated, and Peng Yubin himself was killed at Siting (虒亭) by the waiting Communist Taiyue column.

== Third stage ==
Learning that his reinforcements were annihilated, the Nationalist commander Shi Zebo at Changzhi planned a breakout from the west on 8 October 1945, under the cover of darkness, hoping to reach Linfen. Liu Bocheng and Deng Xiaoping immediately ordered the Taiyue column to move to Mabi (马壁) from Siting to intercept the fleeing enemy. On 12 October 1945, the communist force caught up with the fleeing Nationalist force at the Jiangjunling (将军岭) and Peach River (桃川) regions, decimating the demoralized enemy and capturing the Nationalist commander Shi Zebo alive.

== Conclusion ==
The Shangdang Campaign cost the Kuomintang 13 divisions totalling more than 35,000 troops, with more than 31,000 of those 35,000 captured as POWs by the communists. Of the two Nationalist commanders, Peng Yubin was killed and Shi Zebo was captured alive. The communists suffered over 4,000 casualties, with none captured by the Nationalists. In addition to decimating the Nationalist force with relatively light casualties, the communist force also obtained an important supply of weapons that its force desperately needed, capturing 24 mountain guns, more than 2,000 machine guns, and more than 16,000 rifles, submachine guns, and handguns. The campaign had additional importance for the communists because it was the first campaign in which a communist force engaged an enemy using conventional tactics and succeeded, marking a transition from the guerrilla warfare commonly practiced by the Communists.

On the political front, the campaign was a great boost for the communists in their negotiations at the peace talks in Chongqing. The Kuomintang suffered from the loss of territory, troops, and materiel. The Kuomintang also lost face before the Chinese public.

== See also ==
- Outline of the Chinese Civil War
- History of the People's Liberation Army
