= Fifth encirclement campaign against the Jiangxi Soviet =

Military campaign during the Chinese Civil War

- Part of the Chinese Civil War
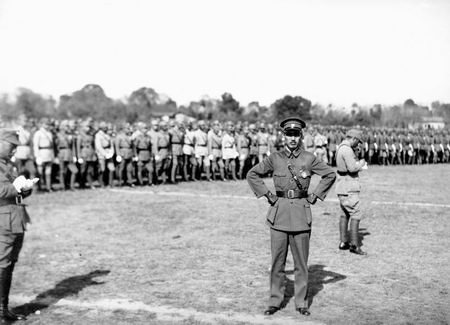
- Generalissimo Chiang Kai-shek in 1933
| Date | September 25, 1933 – October 10, 1934 (1 year, 2 weeks and 1 day) |
| Location | Jiangxi province, China |
| Result | Nationalist major victory; Jiangxi Soviet Eliminated; Red Army forced onto Long March |

Belligerents
| Nationalist China; Nationalist Army; Air Force; Allied Clique Troops; Supported by: (Nazi Germany) Germany | Chinese Soviet; Red Army; Supported by: Soviet Union |

Commanders and leaders
| Chiang Kai-shek; Chen Cheng; Chen Jitang; Xue Yue; Gu Zhutong; Tang Enbo; Alexander von Falkenhausen | Wang Ming; Zhou Enlai; Bo Gu; Otto Braun; Lin Biao; Peng Dehuai; Yang Youlin (executed) |

Strength
| 1,000,000 total mobilised; 500,000 Chiang Kai-shek regime; 300,000 Chen Jitang Clique; 200,000 from various; Northeast; Sichuan; Hunan; Fujian; Guangxi; ～1000 trucks; ～500 artillery pieces; ～270 aircraft | 70,000–150,000 |

Casualties and losses
| 2,626 total casualties ~1,000 killed 1 aircraft lost in accident | ~60,000 total casualties ~9600 killed 1,000+ POW |

The fifth encirclement campaign against the Jiangxi Soviet (Note: Chiang Kai-shek and the Nationalists referred to this operation as the fifth encirclement campaign (Chinese: 第五次圍剿; pinyin: dì wǔ cì wéijiǎo), while the Communists described it as the fifth counter-encirclement campaign at the Central Soviet (Chinese: 中央苏区第五次反围剿; pinyin: zhōngyāng Sūqū dì wǔ cì fǎnwéijiǎo), also known as the fifth counter-encirclement campaign at the Central Revolutionary Base (Chinese: 中央革命根据地第五次反围剿; pinyin: Zhōngyāng gémìng gēnjùdì dì wǔ cì fǎnwéijiǎo) or simply the fifth extermination campaign.) was a series of military operations undertaken during the Chinese Civil War, spanning from September 1933 to October 1934. The conflict pitted the forces of Chiang Kai-shek's Chinese Nationalist Party (Kuomintang) against the Chinese Communists.

Unlike earlier attempts to crush the Chinese Soviet Republic, the fifth campaign was marked by a more methodical strategy. Chiang Kai-shek implemented a policy of gradual advance fortified by the construction of blockhouses, aiming to systematically isolate and annihilate Communist-controlled areas. This tactic ultimately proved effective in tightening the Nationalist stranglehold over the Jiangxi region.

Despite fierce resistance, the Communist forces—under increasingly constrained circumstances—suffered significant losses. By October 1934, the Nationalist Forces had succeeded in overrunning the principal Communist base areas. This defeat forced the Communist leadership to initiate a massive strategic retreat, later memorialised as the beginning of the Long March.

The campaign represented a turning point in the civil conflict, not only due to its military consequences but also for how it reshaped the Communist Party's internal leadership and strategic doctrine in the years that followed.

== Prelude ==
Following the failure of the fourth encirclement campaign in the spring of 1933, Chiang Kai-shek promptly began preparations for a renewed offensive. In response, Nationalist troop mobilisation surged to over one million soldiers, the majority of whom were drawn from the armies of regional warlords. Among these, the most significant contribution came from the Guangdong warlord Chen Jitang, whose force of over 300,000 men constituted approximately 30% of the total Nationalist strength.

Chen's troops were tasked with blockading the southern frontier of the Jiangxi Soviet. However, many warlords displayed only lukewarm commitment to the campaign, driven by self-preservation and political pragmatism. Having already witnessed the failure of four prior encirclement attempts, most warlord leaders were reluctant to risk their own forces. Consequently, their armies largely assumed passive roles—serving as blockade units and occupying previously seized Communist territories—rather than engaging in front-line combat.

In contrast, it was Chiang Kai-shek's own Chinese Nationalist central forces that bore the brunt of the actual fighting during the campaign. This dynamic highlighted the ongoing tensions between the central Nationalist government and the semi-autonomous regional militarists who often prioritised local control over national unity.

== Nationalist Forces ==
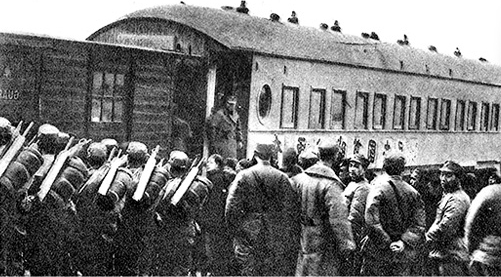
Nationalist troops boarding a military train en route to the front line in Jiangxi.

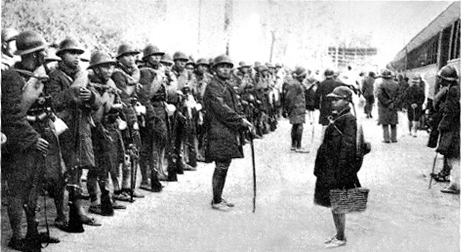
Warlord-affiliated troops gathered before deployment; such units were integrated into the Nationalist campaign.

In July 1933, the Chinese National Revolutionary Army established a review committee to assess and correct errors made during earlier encirclement campaigns. At the divisional level, new training organisations were created to enhance operational readiness. Foreign advisors, most notably from the German Military Mission (Chinese: 德國顧問團), were further integrated into NRA operations. Their expertise was leveraged to modernise both tactics and strategy. The German advisors advocated for a more methodical and structured approach.

The revised strategy began with surrounding and isolating the Communist-controlled zones, thereby cutting off essential logistical supplies such as raw materials, rice, and salt. The next step involved the systematic construction of blockhouses made from concrete and other materials, forming fortified lines capable of delivering suppressive fire and halting breakout attempts by Communist forces. As the encirclement advanced, older blockhouses were abandoned and new ones were established progressively closer to the Communist core. Additionally, new roads were built in the rear areas to streamline supply lines. These methods had previously been employed inconsistently and with limited success, but were now unified under a broader strategic framework.

Within the Chinese Nationalist Party (KMT) ranks, there was a widespread belief that defeating the Chinese Communist Party (CCP) was "70% political and 30% military" (Chinese: 三分軍事，七分政治). This idea was encapsulated in a popular slogan of the time. In line with this philosophy, the ancient Baojia system was revived. Under KMT direction, NRA forces reintroduced village security teams and reconstructed local administrative structures to assert Nationalist control.

The Nationalist fielded approximately 700,000 troops, organised into four main Task Forces and supported by five air groups from the Nationalist Air Force:

- The Northern Task Force, comprising 30 divisions consists mainly of the National Revolutionary Army, was deployed along the Jishui–Jinxi–Nankang–Li'an (黎安) front.
- The Southern Task Force included 11 divisions from Guangdong and one independent regiment, positioned along the Wuping–Anyuan–Ganxian–Shangyou line.
- The Western Task Force was composed of nine divisions from Hunan and three independent regiments, tasked with defending the Gan River and blocking any westward advance by Red Army forces.
- The Eastern Task Force, consisting of 14 divisions, guarded the Fujian–Jiangxi border in the wake of the Fujian Rebellion.
- Lastly, the Fujian–Jiangxi–Zhejiang Military Region Headquarters controlled 11 divisions and four security regiments to secure the northeastern sector.

This deployment resulted in a total force of 75 divisions and 8 independent regiments. Estimates place the main assault force at between 400,000 and 500,000 troops, with up to 1,000,000 personnel committed overall. The strength of the five Aviation Units was estimated to range from 200 to 270 aircraft.

=== Order of Battle (January 1934) ===
Generalissimo: Chiang Kai-shek

==== Northern Task Force (Chinese: 北路軍) ====
Commander-in-Chief: Gu Zhutong
Frontline Commander: Chen Cheng

  - 1st Route Army
    Acting Commander-in-Chief: Gu Zhutong
    Deputy Commander and Garrison Unit Commander: Liu Xing (Chinese: 劉興)
  - 3rd Route Army
    Commander-in-Chief: Chen Cheng
    Deputy Commander: Luo Zhuoying
    - 3rd Column: Fan Songfu
    - 5th Column: Luo Zhuoying
    - 8th Column: Zhou Hunyuan
    - Garrison Unit: Mao Bingwen
    - Reserve Unit
  - 6th Route Army
    Commander-in-Chief: Xue Yue
    - 6th Column: Liu Shaoxian (Chinese: 劉紹先)
    - 7th Column: Wu Qiwei (Chinese: 吳奇偉)
  - 26th Route Army
    Commander-in-Chief: Sun Lianzhong
  - Zhejiang–Jiangxi–Fujian Border Region
    Security Commander: Zhao Guantao
  - General Reserve
    Commander: Qian Dajun

==== Eastern Task Force (Chinese: 東路軍) ====
Commander-in-Chief: Jiang Dingwen

  - 2nd Route Army
    Commander-in-Chief: Jiang Dingwen
    - 4th Column: Li Yannian
  - 5th Route Army
    Commander-in-Chief: Wei Lihuang
    - 9th Column: Liu Heding
    - 10th Column: Tang Enbo
  - General Reserve**
    - 2nd Column: Wang Jingjiu

==== Western Task Force (Hunan) (Chinese: 西路軍) ====
Commander-in-Chief:** He Jian

  - 1st Column: Liu Jianxu
  - 2nd Column: Liu Yinggu (Chinese: 劉膺古)
    - 5th Army: Tan Daoyuan
  - 3rd Column: Chen Jicheng

==== Southern Task Force (Guangdong) (Chinese: 南路軍) ====
Commander-in-Chief:** Chen Jitang

  - 1st Army: Yu Hanmou
  - 2nd Army: Xiang Hanping
  - 3rd Army: Li Yangjing

==== Air Force (Chinese: 空軍) ====
  - 1st Bomber Group
  - 2nd Bomber Group
  - 3rd Reconnaissance and Bomber Group (Provisional)
  - 4th Reconnaissance and Bomber Group (Provisional)
  - 5th Reconnaissance and Bomber Group (Provisional)
- Aircraft Operated: Vought O3U/V-92C, Douglas O-2MC, Breguet 273 and other types.

== Communist Forces ==
The Chinese Red Army had made limited preparations for the fifth encirclement campaign, having prioritised the recruitment of a large standing force for conventional warfare. By late October 1933, the Red Army had grown to approximately 100,000 soldiers. However, this number placed a significant strain on the logistical capacity of the Chinese Soviet Republic, which lacked the infrastructure to support such a large force. Notably, systematic revenue and supply collection had only commenced in August 1933.

Other sources estimate the Red Army's strength at this time to have been either 150,000 or as low as 70,000.

Red Army Organisation
| First Corps | Third Corps | Fifth Corps | Seventh Corps | Eighth Corps | Ninth Corps |
|---|---|---|---|---|---|
| First Division | Fourth Division | Thirteenth Division | Nineteenth Division | Third Division | Twenty-first Division |
| Second Division | Fifth Division | Fifteenth Division | Twentieth Division | Fourteenth Division | Twenty-third Division |
| | Sixth Division | Thirty-fourth Division | | | Twenty-second Division |
| | | | | | Twenty-fourth Division |

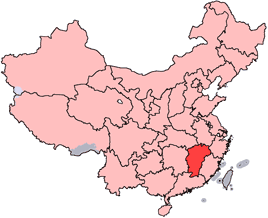
Location of the Jiangxi Soviet

=== Order of Battle (October 1933) ===
Military Commission of the Central Committee of the Chinese Communist Party (Chinese: 中共中央軍事委員會)
*Chairman: Zhu De
*Vice Chairman: Zhou Enlai

- Chinese Workers' and Peasants' Red Army**
  - Commander-in-Chief: Zhu De
  - Political Commissar: Zhou Enlai
  - Director of the Political Department: Wang Jiaxiang

==== First Front Army ====
- Commander: Zhu De
- Political Commissar: Zhou Enlai
- Chief of Staff: Ye Jianying

===== Main Units =====
- 1st Army Group – Lin Biao
- 3rd Army Group – Peng Dehuai
- 5th Army Group – Dong Zhentang
- 7th Army Group – Xiao Jinguang
- 12th Army

==== Regional Military Commands ====
- Jiangxi Military District – Chen Yi
- Hunan–Hubei–Jiangxi Military District – Kong Hechong (Chinese: 孔荷寵)
- Hunan–Jiangxi Military District – Cai Huiwen (Chinese: 蔡會文)
- Fujian Military District – Luo Binghui
- Zhejiang–Jiangxi–Fujian Military District – Tang Caigang (Chinese: 唐在剛)

==== Independent Unit ====
- 2nd Army Group – He Long

== The Campaign ==
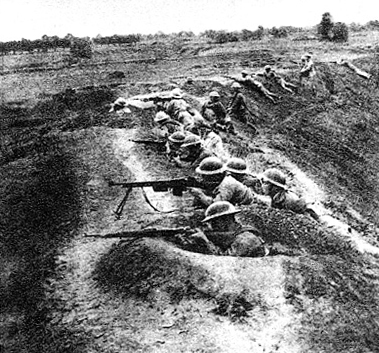
Nationalist infantry entrenched in forward positions during the Fifth Encirclement Campaign.

The campaign officially commenced on 25 September 1933, when the first Nationalist Army assault on Communist positions was launched. Just three days later, the Communists lost control of Lichuan. Although Communist forces managed to halt the Nationalist advance southwest of Lichuan, subsequent operations proved disastrous. On 9 October 1933, the 24th Division of the Red Army attempted to capture Siaoshi Township (Chinese: 懷寧縣小市鎮), but the town remained firmly in Nationalist hands. Over the following days, Communist troops were forced to withdraw, sustaining heavy casualties in the process.

Witnessing this success, Chiang Kai-shek issued a new directive on 17 October 1933, instructing his forces to adopt the principle of tactical defence, strategic offence in order to perfect the Blockhouse Strategy. In contrast, the Communist leadership failed to revise their tactical approach and continued launching ineffective frontal assaults on NRA blockhouses. Between 25 September and mid-November 1933, the Red Army failed to achieve any major victories, suffering significant losses not only from combat, but also due to defection and disease.

=== The Blockhouse Doctrine ===
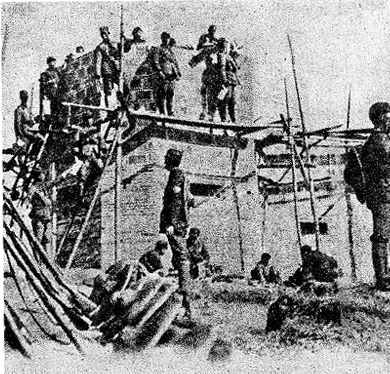
Construction of a Nationalist blockhouse by military engineering units in 1933.

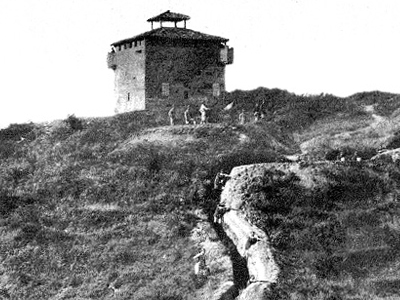
A completed blockhouse overlooking a trench, key to Chiang Kai-shek's fortified encirclement strategy.

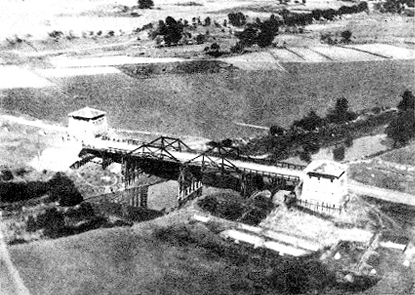
Aerial view of a fortified bridge in Jiangxi Province, part of the Nationalist Army's blockhouse network.

As commander-in-chief of the Nationalist forces, Chiang Kai-shek established his headquarters in Nanchang. Alongside the mobilisation of regional warlord troops, Chiang adopted a strategy of systematic encirclement of the Jiangxi Soviet through the use of fortified blockhouses. This strategy—commonly referred to as the Blockhouse Doctrine (Chinese: 堡壘戰術)—sought to apply gradual, methodical pressure on Communist-held territories through static defence and incremental territorial gains.

Although this approach is often attributed to German military advisers such as Hans von Seeckt and Alexander von Falkenhausen, later analysis suggests the strategy was a synthesis of both foreign guidance and domestic planning. In early 1933, General von Seeckt recommended to Chiang that the Red Army be targeted not through rapid offensives, but by avoiding direct confrontation and instead advancing slowly with strong defensive support. He advised that even if only one kilometre were gained per day, the Communist Central Revolutionary Base Area could be fully subdued within a year.

At a military strategy conference held in Nanchang in June 1933, Chiang officially endorsed this approach. The plan proposed by Nanchang Headquarters staff officer Liu Weiyuan (Chinese: 柳維垣) was adopted, advocating a shift from rapid offensives to a block-by-block advance, with fortifications and roads constructed en route. A special section for blockhouse construction was established under Liu's direction.

By July, Chiang expanded the initiative with a formal officer training programme at Lushan, where the tactical doctrine was further refined to compress and gradually erode the Jiangxi Soviet:

"Blockhouses were to be constructed in a grid, like pattern, advancing cautiously with a focus on area denial, Advance one step, then hold one step." (Chinese: 務期星羅棋布……以守為攻，乘機進剿，對峙則守，得隙則攻……進得一步，即守一步)

Between 1933 and the autumn of 1934, the Nationalist Army reportedly constructed 14,294 blockhouses across the front, with the highest concentration around Fuzhou. A defensive line was formed stretching some 400 kilometres from the eastern boundary of Lichuan to the western approaches of Ji'an and Jizhou, sealing off key transport routes into the Jiangxi Soviet. In eight counties alone— Yihuang, Nancheng, Le'an, Lichuan, Jinxi, Chongren, Zixi, and Nanfeng—over 2,000 blockhouses were established.

The Red Army, suffering from severe shortages of artillery and ammunition, with some units limited to only ten rounds per soldier, was unable to effectively breach the fortifications. This strategy of fortified containment inflicted devastating pressure on the Communist forces, marking a turning point in the Campaign.

Under the strategic direction of a three-man Communist committee—Bo Gu, Zhou Enlai, and Otto Braun—the Red Army launched repeated offensives against these fortified positions. However, these attacks resulted in severe losses and little tactical gain. Over the course of 1933–1934, the territory of the Jiangxi Soviet was drastically reduced. By the end of the campaign, only a small number of towns and cities remained under Communist control.

=== December Offensive ===
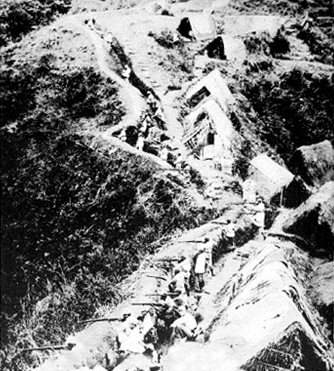
A Nationalist trench line in mountainous terrain, part of the static warfare approach adopted in 1933.

On 11 December 1933, a total of eight columns of NRA troops moved out of their fortified positions and initiated the second phase of the offensive. In response, the Communist leadership resolved to confront the numerically and technologically superior Nationalist forces in open battle. The outcome was devastating for the communists, as Red Army units were decisively defeated.

By the end of January 1934, regional warlord armies had also begun to participate in the campaign. Troops from the Fujian warlord faction attacked from the east, coordinating their assault with Nationalist forces advancing from the north and south.

=== Battle of Guangchang ===
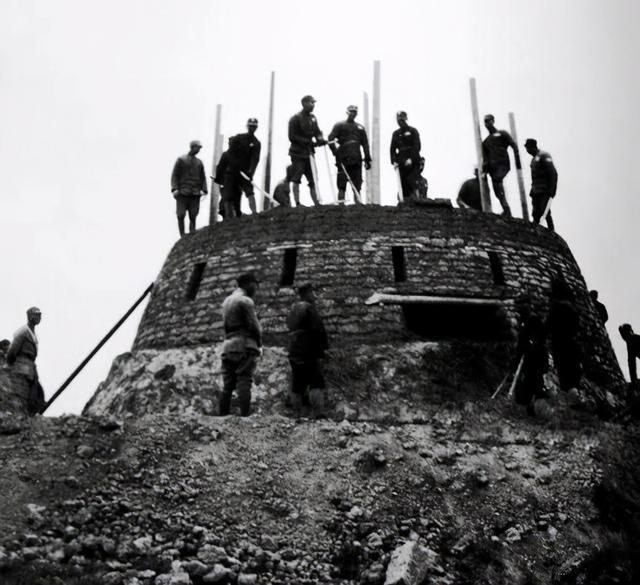
NRA Fortification near Guangchang

On 10 April 1934, eleven divisions of the NRA commenced a major offensive against the town of Guangchang, a strategic stronghold considered the "northern gateway" to the Jiangxi Soviet. In response, the Red Army concentrated nine divisions for its defence, including forces commanded by Peng Dehuai and Yang Shangkun.

Heavy fighting soon erupted along both banks of the Xu River (Chinese: 旴江), with early engagements at Ganzhu, Daluo Mountain (Chinese: 大羅山), and Yanfuzhang (Chinese: 延福嶂) resulting in Nationalist gains due to superior manpower and firepower. The Red Army constructed dozens of bunkers in advance, attempting to use the terrain to mount a determined defence.

On 19 April, the Red Army launched a counterattack against Nationalist positions at Daluo Mountain, but was repelled with significant losses. Meanwhile, the Nationalist Air Force played a growing role in the campaign. From 21 April onward, aircraft from the 1st, 2nd, and 3rd Bombing Groups, along with a reconnaissance squadron, were deployed to support ground operations. These units carried out aerial reconnaissance and bombed key Communist positions around Guangchang, including Changsheng Bridge (Chinese: 長生橋), Qianshan Street (Chinese: 千善街), Daluo Mountain, and Huagai Peak (Chinese: 華蓋尖). Over 1,000 bombs were dropped, and more than 100,000 rounds of machine-gun fire were expended.

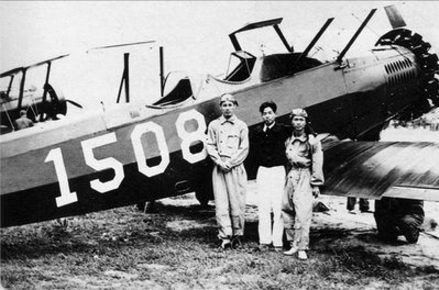
Douglas O2MC-4 aircraft, modified by local Chinese engineers and technicians as bomber aircraft. Such type of aircraft had been used extensively during the air raid of Guangchang.

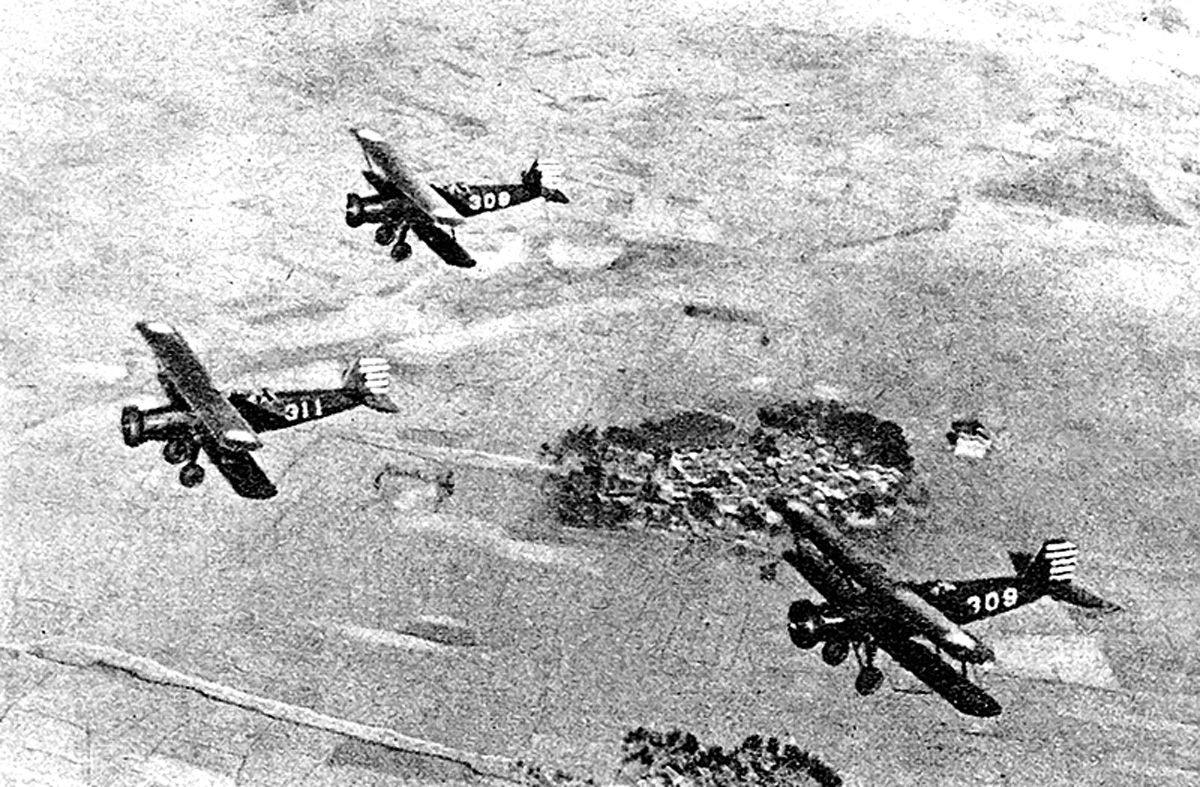
Three Chinese Nationalist Air Force Douglas O2MC-4 aircraft flying in formation during anti-Communist operations.

On 27 April, the NRA launched its final assault on Guangchang. By the evening of 28 April, the Nationalist Army had taken complete control of the town. The battle resulted in 5,093 Communist casualties. Remaining Red Army forces retreated south and west under cover of darkness. More than ten Red Army regimental commanders and officers of higher rank were captured, while over 200 Communist officers below the regimental level surrendered. It was considered one of the most decisive victories achieved by Nationalist forces during the five encirclement campaigns.

Among the most notable losses of the defending communist forces, was one battalion from the Red 3rd Army Corps' 4th Division, which held out in a fortified position at Qingshuitang (Chinese: 清水塘). After withstanding multiple assaults, the position was ultimately destroyed by aerial bombardment, resulting in the complete annihilation of the unit. As Communist General Peng Dehuai later vividly recounted the battle:

"The enemy attacking Guangchang numbered seven divisions and one artillery brigade. Every day some 30 to 40 sorties of aircraft supported their advance. Dragging 'turtle shells' (blockhouses), they advanced step by step, covering only 1,000 to 2,000 metres at a time. Under complete fire superiority, they would halt, fortify their position with fieldworks and firepower, and then resume their advance. Each wave of six or seven aircraft bombed in turn from 8 or 9 in the morning until around 4 in the afternoon. So-called permanent fortifications were levelled. We launched several assaults that day but failed, with nearly 1,000 casualties. One battalion assigned to defend within Otto Baurn's so-called permanent fortifications was completely wiped out, none survived!"

The Battle of Guangchang marked a decisive moment in the Fifth Encirclement Campaign. It underscored the shortcomings of the temporary Communist Central Committee leadership under Bo Gu and Otto Braun, who had rejected Mao Zedong's strategy of mobile warfare in favour of static positional defence. Their insistence on defending Guangchang at all costs—motivated partly by political concerns about abandoning key territory—contributed to the Red Army's heavy losses.

=== Final Phase ===
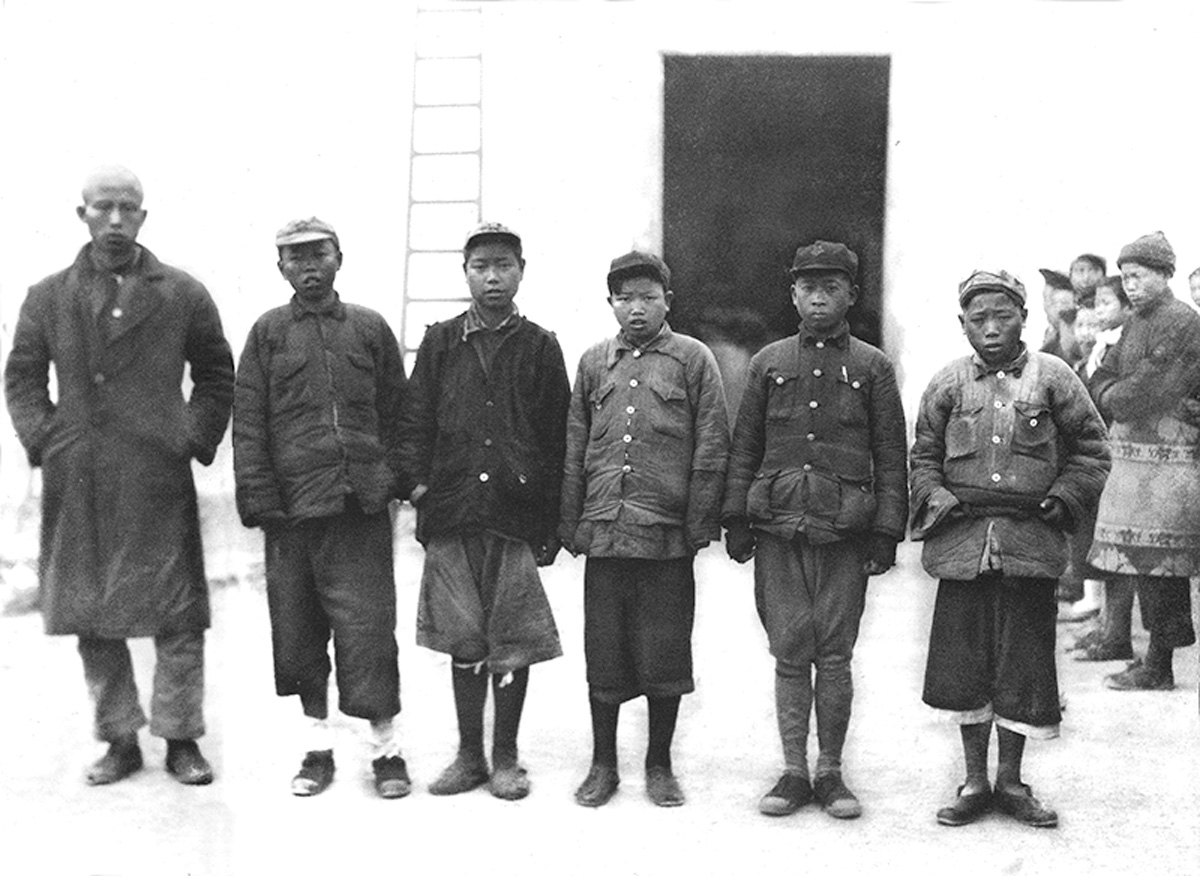
Captured Red Army soldiers, many of them teenagers, held as prisoners of war. In accordance with "Reorganisation Policies (Chinese: 編遣制度)", large numbers of POWs from the Red Army were forcibly conscripted into poorly treated irregular troops.

Following the capture of Guangchang, the NRA advanced further into the Jiangxi Soviet. Red Army forces mounted rearguard actions at Gaohunao (Chinese: 高虎腦) and Wannian Pavilion (Chinese: 萬年亭), but were unable to halt the Nationalist advance. By October 1934, worsening military conditions forced the Communists to abandon their base in Jiangxi.

In early July 1934, the Communist leadership—still led by the three-man committee of Bo Gu, Zhou Enlai, and Otto Braun—divided the main Red Army into six separate groups. On 5 August, nine Nationalist divisions launched renewed offensives from fortified positions, seizing areas north of Yiqian (Chinese: 驛前鎮) and surrounding regions. By late September, the Jiangxi Soviet was reduced to a few scattered areas including Ruijin, Huichang, Xingguo, Ningdu, Shicheng, Ninghua, and Changting.

In October 1934, Chiang Kai-shek flew to Lushan to secretly convene a high-level military conference with provincial commanders from five regions. There, the Iron Bucket Encirclement (Chinese: 鐵桶合圍) plan was adopted, aimed at achieving the total annihilation of the Central Red Army. Under this strategy, half a million Nationalist troops would coordinate a multi-front encirclement of the Communist stronghold centred on Ruijin, Huichang, Yudu, and Xingguo.

The plan envisioned a tightening siege over a 150-kilometre radius, to be completed within months. Before the blockade was sealed, twelve divisions were instructed to skirmish with the Red Army to delay and mislead them. Once the encirclement was complete, these divisions would withdraw to prevent any leakage of information and sever supply routes. According to the plan, for every 0.5 kilometres of advance toward Juichin, one layer of barbed wire was to be installed, and every 5 kilometres a blockhouse line would be constructed. In total, over 300 layers of barbed wire and 30 lines of blockhouses were projected. Up to 1,000 American 10-ton trucks stationed in Nanchang were placed on standby to rapidly deploy reserves and prevent any breakout.

This highly secret meeting, however, was compromised. Mo Xiong, then Commissioner of the Fourth Administrative District of Northern Jiangxi and concurrently Security Commander, was secretly sympathetic to the Communist cause. Several underground agents from the CCP's Shanghai intelligence branch had been placed in his office in key roles. After the conference ended, Mo Xiong passed the multi-pound dossier of strategic plans to a Communist agent named Xiang Yunian, whose public cover was Deputy Commander of Northern Jiangxi's Security Forces in De'an.

To safely deliver the intelligence, Hsiang disguised himself as a travelling schoolteacher and painstakingly copied the documents onto silk paper. His route from De'an to Ruijin crossed eight counties, spanning nearly 1,000 kilometres of mountainous terrain. Travelling mostly at night to avoid suspicion, he reportedly even knocked out four of his own front teeth with bricks to further obscure his identity. Upon arriving in Ruijin, Hsiang delivered the intelligence directly to Zhou Enlai. According to some accounts, Zhou barely recognised him due to his altered appearance.

With this critical warning, the Red Army made a hasty yet organised withdrawal on the night of 10 October 1934, just before the encirclement could be completed. Approximately 86,000 troops broke out of the collapsing Soviet base and embarked on what would become known as the Long March. Later, Mao Zedong would remark that it was the Communist intelligence network that ensured the survival of the Central Red Army and preserved the revolution's core.

== Conclusion ==
Subsequent analyses by the Chinese Communist Party attributed the failure of the Communist forces during the Fifth Encirclement Campaign primarily to strategic and organisational missteps by the Party leadership:

- The campaign had evolved into a prolonged war of attrition, which the Red Army was ill-equipped to sustain. The Communists were unable to replenish lost personnel and supplies. Unlike Mao, the new leadership rejected guerrilla warfare and mobile warfare as outdated, opting instead for conventional warfare—a shift that proved disadvantageous given the Red Army's limited resources and mobility.
- The new leadership adopted a confrontational stance towards all Nationalist forces. Under Mao's previous strategy, a distinction had been drawn between Chiang Kai-shek's Central Army and the regional warlord forces, allowing the Communists to occasionally maintain fragile neutrality with the latter. Consequently, in earlier encirclement campaigns, only around 50,000 of Chiang's own troops were actively engaged. However, the new leadership regarded all Nationalist-aligned troops as equal threats, thus dramatically increasing the effective size of the enemy force the Communists had to confront.
- The Red Army was instructed to adopt static defensive tactics, imitating the strategy used by the Nationalist forces. However, unlike the Nationalists—who relied on fortified concrete blockhouses capable of withstanding the Red Army's rudimentary artillery—the Communists built bunkers from wood and mud. These makeshift defences proved highly vulnerable, not only to Nationalist artillery and aerial bombardment but also to severe weather conditions such as heavy rain and strong winds. Ultimately, these fragile positions became death traps that aided the Nationalist offensive.
- Intelligence was poorly utilised. The Communist leadership showed little confidence in signals intelligence or cryptographic analysis. In earlier campaigns, decrypted Nationalist codes had provided the CCP with a significant advantage. However, the new leadership failed to make effective use of such intelligence, often disregarding it entirely. This neglect persisted until the Long March, when Mao returned to command and prioritised both human and cryptographic intelligence in military planning.
- The strength of the Nationalist forces had increased substantially. In previous campaigns, Nationalist troops had been too few to occupy newly captured territory or provide continuous rear-area security. Gaps between urban garrisons and fortifications allowed the Red Army to exploit weaknesses and infiltrate deep into Nationalist-controlled zones. By contrast, during the Fifth Encirclement Campaign, Chiang Kai-shek commanded a vastly expanded force—estimated at over 500,000—enabling more thorough encirclement, elimination of strategic gaps, and more efficient consolidation of occupied areas.

As a result of the Communist failure to halt the Fifth Encirclement, the largest Communist Base Area in China at that time was irretrievably lost, marking a turning point in the Chinese Civil War.

== See also ==
- Chinese Civil War
- Outline of the Chinese Civil War
- Sino-German cooperation (1911–1941)
- First encirclement campaign
- Second encirclement campaign
- Third encirclement campaign
- Fourth encirclement campaign
