= Third encirclement campaign against the Jiangxi Soviet =

Military campaign during the Chinese Civil War

Third encirclement campaign
- Part of the Chinese Civil War
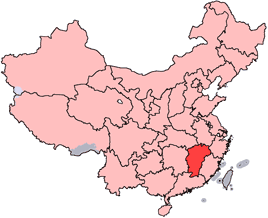
- Location of Jiangxi
Date	July 1 – September 18, 1931
Location	Jiangxi
Result	Red Army victory

Belligerents
(Republic of China (1912–1949)) Republic of China: Kuomintang; Republic of China Armed Forces	Chinese Communist Party: Chinese Workers' and Peasants' Red Army; Chinese Soviet Republic; Jiangxi–Fujian Soviet

Commanders and leaders
Chiang Kai-shek (Director-General of the Kuomintang) He Yingqin Chen Mingshu	Mao Zedong (Chairman of the Chinese Communist Party; Zhu De

Strength
300,000	30,000+

Casualties and losses
30,000	3000

The third encirclement campaign (Chinese: 第三次围剿) against Jiangxi Soviet was the third campaign launched by the Chinese Nationalist Government in the hope of destroying the Red Army in Jiangxi. It was launched less than a month after the previous campaign failed. However, this encirclement was repelled by the Red Army's third counter-encirclement campaign at the Central Soviet (Chinese: 中央苏区第三次反围剿), also called as the third counter-encirclement campaign at the Central Revolutionary Base (Chinese: 中央革命根据地第三次反围剿).

== Strategy ==
Merely three weeks after the defeat of the second encirclement campaign, Chiang Kai-shek reached Nanchang on June 21, 1931, with his foreign military advisory delegations including military advisors from Great Britain, Germany and Japan. The nationalists planned to launch another encirclement campaign in very short time so that their communist enemy would not have enough time to regroup and prepare for the upcoming battles, and Chiang himself became the commander-in-chief of the nationalist force consisting of twenty-four divisions totaling more than three hundred thousand troops. The attacking nationalist forces were divided into two army groups, with the He Yingqing named as the commander-in-chief of the left flank army group, and Chen Mingshu as the commander-in-chief as the right flank army group.

== Order of battle ==
Nationalist order of battle (300,000+ total)

- Left flank army group commanded by He Yingqing would attack from Nancheng (南城)
  - 5th Division commanded by Zhou Hunyuan (周浑元)
  - 6th Division commanded by Zhao Guantao (赵观涛)
  - 8th Division commanded by Mao Bingwen (毛炳文)
  - 9th Division commanded by Jiang Dingwen
  - 11th Division commanded by Luo Zhuoying
  - 14th Division commanded by Chen Cheng
  - 24th Division commanded by Xu Kexiang (许克祥)
- Right flank army group commanded by Chen Mingshu would attack from Ji'an, Yongfeng (永丰), Yue'an (乐安)
  - 25th Division commanded by Sun Lianzhong
  - 27th Division commanded by Gao Shuxun (高树勋)
  - 47th Division commanded by Shangguan Yunxiang (上官云相)
  - 52nd Division commanded by Han Deqin
  - 54th Division commanded by Hao Mengling
  - 60th Division commanded by Cai Tingkai
  - 61st Division commanded by Dai Ji (戴戟)
- General Reserve
  - 10th Division commanded by Wei Lihuang
  - Urban Assault Brigade commanded by Li Yannian (general)
  - 53rd Division commanded by Li Yunheng (李韫珩) would station at Ji'an
- Western Flank along the Gan River:
  - 28th Division commanded by Gong Bingpan (公秉藩)
  - 77th Division commanded by Luo Lin (罗霖)
  - 34th Brigade of the 12th Division commanded by Ma Kun (马昆)
- Eastern Flank at the border region of Fujian-Jiangxi-Guangdong provinces:
  - 49th Division commanded by Zhang Zhen (张贞)
  - 56th Division commanded by Liu Heding (刘和鼎)
  - Newly Organized 14th Brigade commanded by Zhou Zhiqun (周志群)
- Counterguerrilla garrisons in the regions including Zhangshu, Fuzhou, Jiangxi, Yihuang (宜黄), Nancheng, (南城), Lichuan (黎川):
  - 1st Cavalry Division commanded by Guan Shuren (关树人)
  - 23rd Division commanded by Li Yunjie (李云杰)
  - 79th Division commanded by Lu Xiaochen (路孝忱)
- 5 wing of RoCAF:
  - 1st wing
  - 3rd wing
  - 4th wing
  - 5th wing
  - 7th wing
- Other nationalist forces mobilized as the second line units.

Communist order of battle: (30,000+ total)

- First Front Army of Chinese Red Army

== Campaign ==
On July 1, 1931, the nationalists began their offensive. The communists had not fully recovered yet from the last encirclement campaign and Wang Ming's protégés including Xiang Ying had to agree with Mao Zedong's decision to adopt the proven strategies in the earlier campaigns by letting the nationalists penetrate deep into the communist base and then to counterattack individual isolated enemy formations as they were dispersed. On July 10, 1931, the communist main force left western Fujian and traveled more than five hundred kilometers back to Xingguo in southern Jiangxi and waited their opportunities to counterattack. By the end of July 1931, nationalists had discovered that the communist main force had withdrawn to Xingguo, and Chiang Kai-shek immediately ordered his troops to simultaneously attack southward from north and westward from east, so that communists would be forced onto the eastern bank of Gan River and annihilated. The communists, in turn, decided to avoid direct clash with main nationalist force but instead, attack the weaker ones by outflanking the nationalists.

To achieve their goal, communists planned to strike Futian (富田) from Xingguo via Wan'an (万安), and then to strike eastward from the west to sever the nationalist communication/supply lines while the main nationalist force was trapped deep inside the communist base. As the main communist force moved toward Futian (富田), its intent was discovered by the nationalists and the nationalist 11th and 14th Division reached Futian (富田) ahead of the communists, resulting in the communist main force being blocked by the Gan River in the west, and facing the nationalist forces in the east, south and north. The communist high command decided to change their strategy by breaking through in the center and move eastward to the regions of Liantang (莲塘), Liangcun (良村), and Huangbi (黄陂).

In order to hide their true objective, the 35th Army and the 35th Division of the 12th Army of the Chinese Red Army pretended to be the communist main force and moved towards the Gan River to fool nationalists. The main communist force, meanwhile, swiftly moved to the region of Liantang (莲塘) at the night under the cover of the darkness on August 4, 1931 via passing through a twenty-kilometer gap in the nationalist lines between the nationalist divisions commanded Cai Tingkai and Jiang Dingwen. On August 7, 1931, communists succeeded in annihilating more than a brigade of troops from the nationalist 47th Division in the region of Liantang (莲塘), and soon afterward, badly mauling the nationalist 54th Division in Liangcun (良村). On August 11, 1931, communists succeeded in completely destroying four regiments of the nationalist 8th Division at Huangbi (黄陂), and after three consecutive defeats, the nationalist advance was checked temporarily.

Realizing the communist main force was moving eastward, the nationalist troops moving southward and westward were ordered to move eastward on August 9, 1931, in an attempt to sounding the communist main force in the region to the east of Junbu (君埠). The communists ordered their 12th Army (missing its 35th Division) of the Chinese Red Army to move toward Yue'an (乐安) to lure the nationalists northeastward, while the communist main force secretly returned to Xingguo by quietly passing a ten kilometer-wide gap in the nationalist encirclement in the mountain. Half a month later, nationalists chasing the communist 12th Army realized they were after the wrong target and abandoned the chase. As the over stretched nationalist forces attempted to regroup, the communists already had plenty of time to rest and regrouped already, and the nationalist morale dropped to a new low while their supplies had run out. Realizing further fighting was impossible, nationalists were forced to abandon their plans by starting to withdraw in early September 1931.

Taking the opportunity, communists counterattacked, and the only nationalist offensive still remaining was successfully checked when the nationalist 60th Division and 61st Division were forced to be on the defensive and abandoned all offensive attempts. Communists were not satisfied with this success and did not consider it a victory, but a draw instead, and continued their offensive on other fronts. On September 7, 1931, they succeeded in destroying an entire brigade of the nationalist 9th Division in the region of Laoyingpan (老营盘), and on September 15, 1931, another brigade of the nationalist 9th Division and the entire nationalist 52nd Division were completely destroyed by the communists in the region of Fangshiling (方石岭). The nationalist commander of the 52nd Division, Han Deqin, was captured alive together with his staff, becoming the highest ranking nationalist commander captured, but they had successfully avoided being identified by disguising themselves as ordinary soldiers and each received two dollars in silver when released after the campaign. A total of seven nationalist divisions were badly mauled in the six battles, which communists themselves labeled as five victories and one draw, and nationalists suffered over 30,000 casualties. In addition, the communists also captured more than 20,000 rifles in their victory.

== Aftermath ==
Capitalizing on their victory, communists launched their offensives into the nationalist dominated regions, further expanding their communist base in Jiangxi, resulting in previously two separate communist bases in southern Jiangxi and western Fujian joining together into a larger one, covering twenty-one counties totaling more than fifty square kilometers, with permanent residents totaling more than two and half a million. The communist success paved the way for the communist base to later expand to its ultimate size with population over three million. It was worth to note that though Mao Zedong was still viewed by many communists as the supreme commander, his positions had already been actually reduced significantly since the last encirclement campaign, and it was only because Wang Ming's protégés had not yet fully established their absolute authority, plus the fact that Mao's previous proven strategies had once more been applied in this campaign that created the false impression that Mao was still the supreme leader. After this campaign, Mao soon fell from power as the internal political power struggle intensified and Wang Ming emerged victorious. The encirclement stopped because the Japanese launched the Mukden Incident.

== See also ==
- Outline of the Chinese Civil War
- National Revolutionary Army
- History of the People's Liberation Army
- First encirclement campaign against Jiangxi Soviet
- Second encirclement campaign against Jiangxi Soviet
- Fourth encirclement campaign against Jiangxi Soviet
- Fifth encirclement campaign against Jiangxi Soviet
