= Second encirclement campaign against the Jiangxi Soviet =

Military campaign during the Chinese Civil War

Second encirclement campaign
- Part of the Chinese Civil War
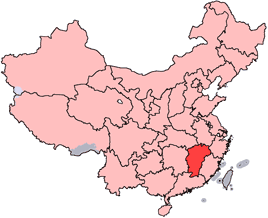
- Location of Jiangxi
Date	April 1 – May 31, 1931
Location	Jiangxi province
Result	Red Army victory

Belligerents
Nationalist China	Chinese Red Army

Commanders and leaders
He Yingqin; Chiang Kai-shek	Zhu De; Mao Zedong

Strength
200,000	30,000+

Casualties and losses
30,000	3000

The second encirclement campaign (Chinese: 第二次围剿) against Jiangxi Soviet was a series of battles launched by the Chinese Nationalist Government in the hope of encircling and destroying the Jiangxi Soviet after the previous campaign had failed. The Red Army repelled the encirclement by launching their second counter-encirclement campaign (Chinese: 中央苏区第二次反围剿), also called by the communists as the second counter-encirclement campaign at Central Revolutionary Base (Chinese: 中央革命根据地第二次反围剿), in which the local Chinese Red Army successfully defended the Jiangxi Soviet against the Nationalist attacks from April 1, 1931, to May 31, 1931.

== Strategies ==
TIME magazine reported that on Jan. 26, 1931, Chiang Kai-shek ordered an offensive launched on January 19 by the 18th army division, when the Red Army managed to encircle it, they gave up their weapons along with the defection of the entire division to the Communist side. 100,000 were reported killed by the Communists. The communists demanded that 2 Million Mexican dollars be paid for the release of the divisional Commander Chang Chi-tsan, Chiang responded with a renewed 4 division offensive.

After the defeat of the first encirclement campaign, the nationalists quickly regrouped and prepared for the second encirclement campaign against the Jiangxi Soviet. In February 1931, Chiang Kai-shek named He Yingqing the acting commander-in-chief and deployed nineteen divisions totaling over 200,000 troops for the second encirclement. The nationalists completed their planned deployment by late March 1931.

In contrast, the Chinese Communist Party was slow to develop its own strategies because of internal power struggles. Wang Ming's protégé Xiang Ying had reached the Jiangxi Soviet after the third plenary session of the 6th National Congress of the Chinese Communist Party, and on January 15, 1931, the communist Jiangxi Soviet (Communist) Central Bureau for political administration and the Central Military Commission were formed. Xiang Ying became the head of both organizations, as party secretary of the bureau and chairman of the commission.

Zhu De and Mao Zedong lost power, as both were only named as deputy chairmen of the commission - though Zhu was named as the commander-in-chief and Mao was named as the political commissar of the 1st Front Army of the Chinese Red Army. Mao was also named as the director of the general political directorate. Xiang Ying's power was further strengthened in April 1931, when Wang Ming's delegation reached the Jiangxi Soviet to assist him to lead. As a result, the communists disagreed on the strategies that should be taken in countering the upcoming nationalist encirclement campaign. The communist leadership dominated by Wang Ming and represented by Xiang Ying decided on strategies consisted of following principles:

- Concentrate numerically superior force to destroy the enemy before they grouped together.
- Luring the enemy deep into the communist base was a strategy that only applied to the early stages, and communist force should attack the nationalist dominated regions to destroy the enemy instead.
- When necessary, Jiangxi Soviet should be abandoned in an attempt to establish new communist bases elsewhere.

Given the strength of the communist force at the time, this impractical strategy was obviously out of touch with reality and faced strong opposition. Some members of Wang Ming's own camp even disagreed, and suggested the alternative strategy of separating the communist force to defeat enemy at the multiple fronts. Obviously, this alternative strategy was equally out of touch with reality and at the conference of the communist Central Bureau held from March to April 1931, it could not be decided whether to engage the nationalist 19th Route Army first, or the nationalist 6th Route Army first.

With the support of most commanders, Mao Zedong opposed both impractical strategies developed by the newly arrived protégés of Wang Ming. Mao reasoned the nationalist 6th Army, 19th Army and 26th Army were some of the strongest armies among nationalist forces, and thus were difficult targets. In contrast, the 43rd Division, 47th Division, and 54th Division of the nationalist 5th Army were just newly arrived from north, while the 28th Division and 77th Division of the nationalist 5th Army were previously defeated by the communists in the last encirclement campaign, thus they were weak and less enthusiastic in actively engaging communist forces, hence should be engaged first by the communists. In the meantime, if the communists were to strike westward from the east, the Gan River would be a limit. If the communists were to strike eastward from Futian (富田) in the west, then not only there would not be any geographic limits, but regions in the border of Fujian and Jiangxi including Lichuan, Taining, and Jianning would likely to fall into Communist hands more easily, resulting in expanding the Communist base. Therefore, Communists should adopt the same successful strategies proven in the last encirclement campaign, and Mao's idea was accepted by everyone after lengthy debates. On March 23, 1931, Communist forces withdrew to regions including Yongfeng, Le'an, Yihuang and Nanfeng, at the northern border of the Jiangxi Soviet to regions in the south, including Guangchang, Shicheng, Ningdu and Ruijin. Massive mobilization efforts were conducted to mobilize local population to defend the Communist base.

== Order of battle ==
Nationalist order of battle (200,000+ total)

- 5th Route Army commanded by Wang Jingyu (王金钰) would attack Donggu and Tengtian (藤田) from Ji'an, Taihe, Jishui, and Yongfeng
  - 28th Division commanded by Gong Bingpan (公秉藩)
  - 43rd Division commanded by Guo Huazong (郭华宗)
  - 47th Division commanded by Shangguan Yunxiang
  - 54th Division commanded by Hao Mengling
  - 77th Division commanded by Luo Lin (罗霖)
- 6th Route Army commanded by Zhu Shaoliang would attack Guangchang and Huangbo (黄陂) from Nanfeng and Badu (八都).
  - 5th Division commanded by Hu Zuyu (胡祖玉)
  - 8th Division commanded by Mao Bingwen
  - Newly Organized 13th Division commanded by Lu Xiaochen (路孝忱)
  - 24th Division commanded by Xu Kexiang (许克祥)
  - 56th Division commanded by Liu Heding (刘和鼎) had a mission different than the rest of divisions of the 6th Route Army in that it was tasked to attack from Anyuan to prevent the communists from fleeing southeastward.
- 19th Route Army commanded by Cai Tingkai would attack Longgangtou (龙冈头) and Ningdu from Xingguo
  - 34th Brigade of the 12th Division commanded by Ma Kun (马昆)
  - 60th Division commanded by Cai Tingkai
  - 61st Division commanded by Dai Ji
- 26th Route Army commanded by Sun Lianzhong would attack Dongshao and Xiaobu from Le'an and Yihuang
  - 25th Division commanded by Sun Lianzhong
  - 27th Division commanded by Gao Shuxun
  - 1st Cavalry Division commanded by Guan Shuren (关树人)
- Following nationalist units were tasked to prevent communists from fleeing southeastward:
  - 49th Division commanded by Zhang Zhen (张贞) would strike from Shanghang and Wuping
  - 62nd Division commanded by Xiang Hanping would strike from Jiaoling
  - Newly Organized 14th Brigade commanded by Zhou Zhiqun (周志群) would strike from Ninghua
  - Independent 32nd Brigade commanded by Lu Xingbang (卢兴邦) would strike from Liancheng, and Changting
- 52nd Division commanded by Han Deqin was tasked to protect the riverine transportation line of Gan River.
- 3 wings of the RoCAF were tasked with bombing and reconnaissance missions.

Communist order of battle: (30,000+ total)

- First Front Army of Chinese Red Army

== Campaign ==
On April 1, 1931, the second encirclement campaign against Jiangxi Soviet formally began as the nationalists attacked in four fronts and by April 23, they had taken regions abandoned by the communists, including Jiangbeidong (江背洞), Longgangtou (龙冈头), Futian (富田), Shuinan (水南), Yanfang (严坊), Zhaoxie (招携) and Guangchang. In the meantime, the communist force withdrew to regions including Longgang, Shanggu (上固) and Donggu to wait for the opportunity to pounce on the nationalists, and secretly gathered right next to the nationalist force in the Donggu region without being detected for twenty-five days.

On May 13, 1931, the communists got the opportunity they had been waiting for when the nationalist 28th Division and a brigade of the nationalist 47th Division began to move toward Donggu (东固) from Futian (富田). The communists ambushed the unsuspecting nationalists and after two days of fighting that lasted from May 15 to May 17, 1931, the ambushed nationalist force was completely destroyed in the regions of Zhongdong (中洞) and Jiucunling (九寸岭). Continuing their counteroffensives, the communists badly mauled the nationalist 43rd Division on May 19 in the region of Baisha (白沙), the nationalist survivors were forced to flee to the region of Yongfeng (永丰). Unaware that their comrades-in-arms had already been defeated, nationalist 27th Division went out to reinforce their besieged comrades-in-arms and was ambushed in the region of Zhongcun (中村) on May 22, with an entire brigade acting as a vanguard was lost. Unable to rescue its vanguard, the rest of the nationalist 27th Division wisely chose to abandon the fight and withdrew safely.

On May 27, 1931, the communist counteroffensive led their victory at Guangchang, retaking the city and badly mauling the nationalist 5th Division in the process, including severely wounding its commander Hu Zuyu (胡祖玉), who eventually died of his wounds in the campaign. On May 31, 1931, the communists attacked Jianning (建宁), badly mauling the nationalist 56th Division, which lost an entire brigade. After five consecutive defeats in sixteen days and being pushed back near four hundred kilometers thus losing all of their newly gained territory, the nationalists had enough and decided to end the campaign by withdrawing. The communists subsequently declared a victory.

== Aftermath ==
The communists managed to annihilate over thirty thousand nationalist troops and captured over twenty thousand guns, and Gong Bingpan (公秉藩), the commander of the nationalist 28th Division was captured alive by the communists, the highest ranking nationalist captured in the campaign, but he cleverly escaped by avoiding being recognized by the communists:

After the nationalists withdraw, each nationalist prisoner was given two silver dollars to go home. Gong Bingpan carefully waited all the way in the back of the crowd to avoid being identified and recognized, but as he was called to receive his money, there was only one silver dollar left. Communists in charge wanted Gong Bingpan to wait so that they could get another silver dollar for him but this delay would only provide more chances for him to be recognized. Gong Bingpan cleverly told the communists: "Comrades, I have friends in Ji'an who could provide me financial assistance, and I would only need a single silver dollar, there is no need to get another one". The communists were of course very happy in saving a silver dollar and thus let him go with only one silver dollar. Gong Bingpan's experience was important because it would later help other high ranking nationalist commanders captured in later encirclement campaigns to successfully escape, thus avoiding certain jail time or even possible execution.

Capitalizing on their victory, the communists launched a series of offensives against the nationalists, taking several counties in eastern Jiangxi and western Fujian, including Lichuan, Nanfeng, Jianning, Taining, Ninghua, and Changting, further expanding the Jiangxi Soviet.

== See also ==
- Outline of the Chinese Civil War
- National Revolutionary Army
- History of the People's Liberation Army
- First encirclement campaign against Jiangxi Soviet
- Third encirclement campaign against Jiangxi Soviet
- Fourth encirclement campaign against Jiangxi Soviet
- Fifth encirclement campaign against Jiangxi Soviet
