= Fourth encirclement campaign against the Jiangxi Soviet =

Military campaign during the Chinese Civil War

Fourth encirclement campaign
- Part of the Chinese Civil War
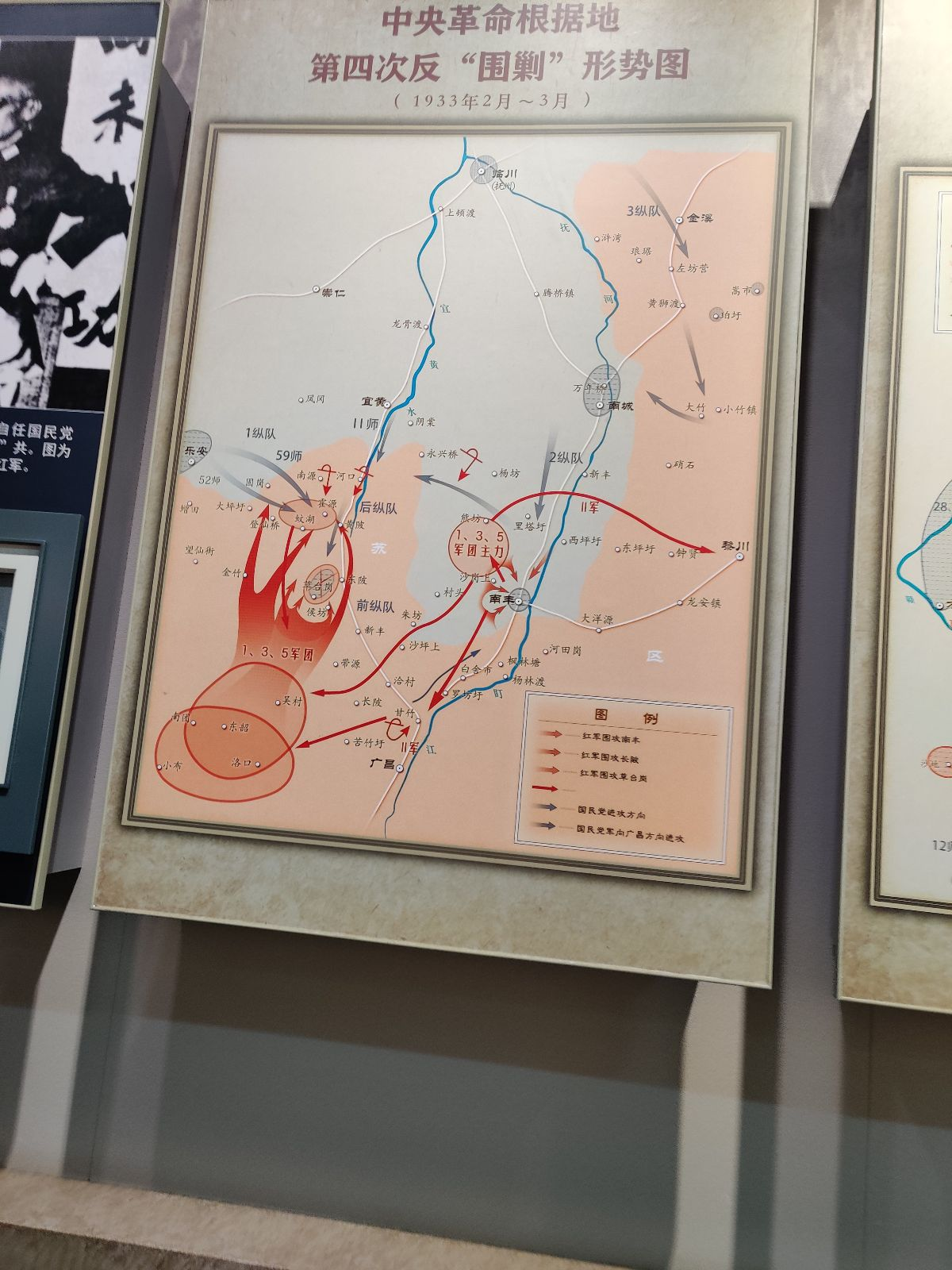
- Map of the Fourth encirclement campaign against the Jiangxi Soviet, from the Zunyi Conference museum
| Date | February – March 1933 |
| Location | Jiangxi province |
| Result | Red Army victory |

Belligerents
| Nationalist China | Chinese Red Army |

Commanders and leaders
| Chiang Kai-shek; He Yingqin; Chen Cheng; Cai Tingkai | Zhu De; Zhou Enlai; Bo Gu; Li De |

Strength
| 500,000+ | 70,000+ |

Casualties and losses
| 30,000 | ? |

The fourth encirclement campaign against the Jiangxi Soviet (Chinese: 第四次围剿) was the fourth campaign launched by the Chinese Nationalist Government in hope to destroy the Red Army in Jiangxi. The Nationalist headquarters in the provincial border of Jiangxi-Guangdong-Fujian organized nearly 400,000 men, and prepared for another major encirclement on the Chinese Soviet Republic. As a response, the Jiangxi Soviet launched the fourth counter-encirclement campaign at the Central Soviet (Chinese: 中央苏区第四次反围剿), also called as the fourth counter-encirclement campaign at the Central Revolutionary Base (Chinese: 中央革命根据地第四次反围剿). Although the Red Army achieved victory once again, their counter encirclement was not as successful as the previous ones this time, and the Red Army elsewhere suffered considerable loss when many other Communist bases were lost, including two major ones.

The battle happened between February and March 1933.

== See also ==
- List of battles of the Chinese Civil War
- National Revolutionary Army
- History of the People's Liberation Army
- Chinese Civil War
- First encirclement campaign
- Second encirclement campaign
- Third encirclement campaign
- Fifth encirclement campaign
