= Jiangxi Soviet =

Part of the Chinese Soviet Republic in the Chinese Civil War

Central Revolutionary Base Area 中央革命根據地
- Revolutionary base area of the Chinese Soviet Republic
- 1931–1934
- Flag
- Capital: Ruijin
- Historical era: Chinese Civil War
  - Established: 1931
  - Disestablished: 1934
Preceded by	Succeeded by
Communist-controlled China	Communist-controlled China; Republic of China

Jiangxi Soviet
- Traditional Chinese: 閩贛蘇區
- Simplified Chinese: 闽赣苏区
Transcriptions
Standard Mandarin
- Hanyu Pinyin: Mǐn-Gàn Sūqū
- Wade–Giles: Min-kan Su-ch'ü

Central Revolutionary Base Area
- Traditional Chinese: 中央革命根據地
- Simplified Chinese: 中央革命根据地
Transcriptions
Standard Mandarin
- Hanyu Pinyin: Zhōngyāng Gémìng Gēnjùdì
- Wade–Giles: Chung-yang Ko-ming Ken-chü-ti

Central Soviet Zone
- Traditional Chinese: 中央蘇區
- Simplified Chinese: 中央苏区
Transcriptions
Standard Mandarin
- Hanyu Pinyin: Zhōngyāng Sūqū
- Wade–Giles: Chung-yang Su-ch'ü

The Jiangxi Soviet, (Note: Sometimes referred to as the Jiangxi–Fujian Soviet, which is romanized as the "Kiangsi–Fukien Soviet" in Wade-Giles. The official name was the Central Revolutionary Base Area.) sometimes referred to as the Jiangxi-Fujian Soviet, was a soviet area governed by the Chinese Communist Party (CCP) that existed between 1931 and 1934 in southeastern Jiangxi and southwestern Fujian province. It was the largest component of the Chinese Soviet Republic (CSR) and home to its capital, Ruijin. At the time, the CCP was engaged in a rural insurgency against the Kuomintang-controlled Nationalist Government as part of the Chinese Civil War. CCP leaders Mao Zedong and Zhu De chose to create the soviet in the rugged Jinggang Mountains on the border of Jiangxi and Fujian because of its remote location and defensible terrain. The First Red Front Army successfully repulsed a series of encirclement campaigns by the Kuomintang's National Revolutionary Army (NRA) during the first few years of the Soviet's existence, but they were eventually defeated by the NRA's fifth attempt between 1933 and 1934. After the Jiangxi Soviet was defeated militarily, the CCP began the Long March towards a new base area in the northwest.

== Beginning ==
The Jiangxi Soviet was a large base area in the 1930s, and the first component of the Chinese Soviet Republic.

On November 7, 1931, on the anniversary of the 1917 Russian Bolshevik Revolution, the Soviet Union helped organize a National Soviet People's Delegates Conference in Ruijin, Jiangxi province. Ruijin was the county seat and was selected as the capital of the new Soviet republic. The "Chinese Soviet Republic" was born, though the majority of China was still under the control of the Nationalist-led Government of the Republic of China. On that day, they had an open ceremony for the new country, and Mao Zedong and other communists attended a military parade. Claiming its own bank, printing its own money, and collecting tax through its own tax bureau, the modern Chinese Communist Party considers this the beginning of Two Chinas.

With Mao Zedong as both head of state (Chinese: 中央执行委员会主席) and head of government (人民委员会主席), the CSR expanded, especially within Jiangxi-Fujian border region, reaching a peak territory claim of more than 30,000 km^{2} (12,000 sq mi) and a population that numbered more than three million, covering considerable parts of two provinces (with Tingzhou in Fujian). Its economy was doing better than most other areas that were under the control of the Chinese warlords, though still suffered by comparison to non-warlord-controlled China. In addition to militia, its regular army numbered more than 140,000 by the early 1930s -- larger than the armies of most contemporary Chinese warlords, though still smaller than the Nationalist forces. The Chinese Red Army also possessed modern communications equipment, such as telephones, telegraphs, and radios, which most Chinese warlords' armies still lacked, and was regularly transmitting and receiving wireless coded messages.

== Policy ==
By 1930, Deng Zihui's experiments with land reform in Minxi had been widely disseminated in CCP publications and became an important point of reference for the Jiangxi Soviet's land policies from 1931 to 1934.

The constitution of the Jiangxi Soviet endorsed separation of church and state.

In opposition to traditional arranged marriage customs, the laws of the Jiangxi Soviet protected freely chosen marriage. These laws became a model for marriage laws in other CCP-controlled areas.

== Purges and massacres ==
As Marc Opper (2018) wrote,

In its drive to prevent defection to the GMD [also spelled "KMT"] and to ensure continued compliance, the CCP engaged in a widespread campaign of violence against civilians. The CCP detained those it suspected of being unreliable, confiscated their property, and organized them into hard labor brigades. Yet others were killed because they were regarded as suspect by the CCP because they criticized the CSR [Chinese Soviet Republic in Jiangxi]'s enormous extraction of manpower and resources. But by far the greatest amount of violence was against those the CCP suspected of being sympathetic to the advancing GMD. [...] Mass killings took place throughout the CSR in anticipation of the GMD attack, as well as prior to the CCP's evacuation of territory. Mass executions of civilians were reported in Ruijin and Ningdu, and relief work by the Red Swastika Society, a religious charity, gave proper burials to thousands of bodies in Ningdu and Guangchang. The scale of the killing was so extensive that the then-leader of the CCP, Zhang Wentian, called for moderation, but only once and only briefly.

According to Li Weihan, a high-ranking CCP member in Jiangxi at the time, "The reaction from local authorities, he noted, was usually to send armed squads after those attempting to flee and kill them on the spot, producing numerous mass graves throughout the CSR [Chinese Soviet Republic in Jiangxi] that would later be uncovered by the KMT and its allies." According to censuses, Jiangxi's population declined by 3.16 million from 1931 to January 1936 due to the Chinese Civil War, among which there was a drop of 700,000 (roughly 20%) in the fifteen counties under the Jiangxi Soviet. Jon Halliday and Jung Chang in the book Mao: The Unknown Story estimated all these 700,000 deaths were attributable to the regime of the Jiangxi Soviet. Causes of death included being murdered as class enemies, worked to death, or suicide.

In 1983, the Ministry of Civil Affairs ordered local governments to politically rehabilitate the dead who were wrongfully purged during this period. As a result, around 250,000 Jiangxi people were posthumously recognized as "revolutionary martyrs", including both the purged and civilian war casualties. Among these 250,000, 160,000 were from Ganzhou and Ji'an, the base of the Jiangxi Soviet.

== Encirclement ==
The government of China, the Kuomintang (KMT), led by Chiang Kai-shek, moved against the Soviet republic, consolidating many former Chinese warlords in the creation of the National Revolutionary Army to repeatedly besiege the various enclaves of the Soviet Republic, launching what Chiang and his fellow Nationalists called encirclement campaigns (the Communists called their counterattacks "counter-encirclement campaigns"). While the first, second and third military encirclements were defeated by the First Front Red Army, they suffered massive losses: the Red Army was nearly halved, with most of its equipment lost during Chiang and von Seeckt's fifth encirclement campaign, utilizing fortified blockhouses.

In an effort to break the blockade, the Red Army under the orders of the three-man committee besieged the forts many times but continued to suffer heavy casualties with little success at the hands of untrained, untested, and uncaring leadership. The Jiangxi Soviet shrank significantly in size due to the disastrous leadership, manpower, and material losses. By the fall of 1934, the Communists faced near-total annihilation. This situation had already convinced Mao Zedong and his supporters to believe that the Communists should abandon their bases in the Jiangxi Soviet republic. However, the Communist leadership refused to accept the failure, continuing to plot the defeat of the Nationalist forces. The three-man committee devised a plan of diversions, and then a regroup after a temporary retreat. Once the regroup was complete, a counterattack would be launched in conjunction with the earlier diversion forces, driving the enemy out of the Jiangxi Soviet.

The first movements of the retreating diversion were undertaken by Fang Zhimin. Fang Zhimin and his deputy, Xun Weizhou, were first to break through Kuomintang lines in June, followed by Xiao Ke in August. Though these movements were unexpected, as the Kuomintang were numerically superior to the Communists at the time and did not expect an attack on their fortified perimeter, things did not turn out as the Communists had hoped: Fang Zhimin's force was crushed after its initial success, and with Xun Weizhou killed in action, nearly every commander in this force was wounded and captured alive, including Fang Zhimin himself, and all were executed. The only exception was Su Yu, who managed to escape. Xiao Ke fared no better: although his force initially managed to break through and then reached He Long's Communist base in Hubei, but even with their combined forces, they were entirely defeated and unable to challenge the far superior Nationalist force besieging the Jiangxi Soviet, never to return until the establishment of the People's Republic of China 15 years later.

The failure of the diversion forces resulted in their loss of contacts with the Jiangxi Soviet, and the Communist leadership failed to coordinate its next proper move in a timely fashion, still believing that a temporary retreat near or within the Jiangxi Soviet would allow them to recover and counterattack, eventually driving out the Nationalist force.

== Collapse ==
In late September 1934, Chiang distributed his top-secret "Iron Bucket Plan" to his general headquarters at Lushan (the alternative summer site to Nanchang), which detailed the final push to totally annihilate all Communist forces. The plan was to build 30 blockade lines supported by 30 barbed wire fences, most of them electric, in the region 150 km (93 mi) around Ruijin, to starve the Communists. In addition, more than 1,000 trucks were to be mobilized to form a rapid reaction force in order to prevent any Communist breakout. Realizing the certain annihilation of the Communists, Mo Xiong handed a copy of the document weighing several kilograms to his Communist handler Xiang Yunian (項與年) the same night he received it, risking not only his own life but that of his entire family.

With the help of Liu Yafo (劉亞佛) and Lu Zhiying, the Communist agents copied the important intelligence onto four dictionaries and Xiang Yunian was tasked to take the intelligence personally to the Jiangxi Soviet. The trip was hazardous, as the Nationalist force would arrest and often execute anyone who attempted to cross the blockade. Xiang Yunian was forced to hide in the mountains for a while, and then used rocks to knock out 4 of his own teeth, resulting in swollen face. Disguised as a beggar, he tore off the covers of the four dictionaries and hid them at the bottom of his bag with rotten food, then successfully crossed several lines of the blockade and reached Ruijin on October 7, 1934. The valuable intelligence provided by Mo Xiong finally convinced the Communists in the Jiangxi Soviet to abandon its base and started a general retreat before Chiang could complete the building of his blockade lines with supporting barbed wire fences and mobilizing trucks and troops, thus saving themselves from total annihilation.

As the result of their catastrophic defeat, Xiang Ying was removed from his post of the chairman of the communist central military committee, and replaced by Zhou Enlai. Xiang Ying was put in charge of 20,000 soldiers that were assigned to stay behind in the Jiangxi Soviet to continue the fight against the Nationalists after the communist main force consisted of more than 80,000 had broken out. Xiang Ying was assisted by other top-ranking communist cadres assigned to stay behind with him, including Chen Yi, Zeng Shan, He Chang, and Ruan Xiaoxian, but Xiang had not learned from his previous disastrous blunder and continued his early practice when conducting battles, against the strong objection of Chen Yi. As a result of another huge blunder committed by Xiang Ying, the Chinese Red Army stayed behind was soon annihilated by the superior Nationalist force, Xiang was barely able to escape with his own life, while many of his comrades were killed, including He Chang and Ruan Xiaoxian. So insignificant was the communist threat left had become that the Nationalist reward for capturing Chen Yi was once dropped to 500 dollars in silver, a tiny .25% of its earlier peak of 200,000 dollars in silver.

The Jiangxi Soviet was the departure point of the Long March. On October 10, 1934, the three-man committee Communist leadership formally issued the order of the general retreat, and on October 16, 1934, the Chinese Red Army begun what was later known as the Long March, fully abandoning the Jiangxi Soviet. 17 days after the main Communist force had already left its base, the Nationalists were finally aware that the enemy had escaped after reaching the empty city of Ruijin on November 5, 1934. Contrary to the common erroneous belief, the original destination was He Long's Communist base in Hubei, and the final destination Yan'an was not decided on until much later during the Long March, after Mao Zedong had assumed command. To avoid panic, the goal was kept a secret from most people, including Mao Zedong, and the public was told that only a portion of the Chinese Red Army would be engaged in mobile warfare to defeat Nationalist forces, and thus this part of the army would be renamed as the Field Army.

== First Front Red Army ==
In reality, the portion of the Chinese Red Army engaged in the Field Army included the majority of the Communist force, which was making a general retreat from the city. However, the bulk of this force was only a fraction of what used to be more than 140,000 men army at its peak. With most of its equipment lost, many of the surviving members of the Chinese Red Army were forced to arm themselves with outdated weaponry. According to the Statistical Chart of the Field Army Personnel, Weaponry, Ammunition, and Supply (Currently kept at the People's Liberation Army's Archives) completed by the Chinese Red Army on October 8, 1934, two days before the Long March began, the Communist Long March force consisted of the following:

=== Order of battle ===
The escaping communists included a total of 72,313 combatants and additional noncombatants, and they were organized into 7 formations, 5 armies (called legions by the communists) and 2 divisions (called columns by the communists), and these included:

- (Communist) Central Military Committee Column (1st Column)
  - Committee chairman / Commander-in-Chief: Zhu De
  - Deputy committee chairmen: Zhou Enlai and Wang Jiaxiang
  - Chief-of-general-staff: Liu Bocheng
  - Director of the General Political Directorate: Li Fuchun
- (Communist) Central (Committee) Column (2nd Column)
  - Commander: Zhou Enlai
  - Political commissar: Li Weihan (using alias Luo Mai 罗迈参 at the time)
  - Chief-of-staff: Zhang Yunyi
  - Security Bureau chief: Deng Fa
  - Senior Cadres Regiment consisted of Chinese Red Army University cadets:
    - Commander: Xiao Jinguang
  - Cadres Regiment consisted of Chinese Red Army (Junior) Academy cadets:
    - Commander: Chen Geng
    - Political Commissar: Song Renqiong
    - Chief-of-staff: Bi Shiti, aka Yang Lin (杨林, a Korean communist)
    - Director of the Political Directorate: Mo Wenhua
  - National Garrison Regiment
    - Commander: Yao Zhe
    - Political commissar: Zhang Nansheng
- The 1st Legion (The largest of the five armies, with 19,880 combatants)
  - Commander: Lin Biao
  - Political commissar: Nie Rongzhen
  - Chief-of-staff: Zuo Quan
  - (Communist) Central (Committee) Local Work Regiment commander:
  - Security Bureau special appointee: Luo Ruiqing
  - Secretariat political secretary: Fang Qiang (方强)
- The 3rd Legion
  - Commander: Peng Dehuai
  - Political commissar: Yang Shangkun
  - Chief-of-staff: Deng Ping
  - Director of the Political Directorate: Yuan Guoping
  - (Communist) Central (Committee) Local Work Regiment commander: Guo Qian (郭潜), later defected to the Nationalist side and changed his name to Guo Qianhui (郭乾辉)
  - Security Bureau special appointee: Zhang Chunqing (张纯清)
- The 5th Legion
  - Commander: Dong Zhentang
  - Political commissar: Cai Shufan
  - Chief-of-staff: Chen Bojun
  - Director of the Political Directorate: Li Zhuoran
  - (Communist) Central (Committee) Local Work Regiment commander: Zheng Zhenxun (郑询振)
- The 8th Legion (The newest and smallest of the five, with 10,922 combatants)
  - Commander: Zhou Kun
  - Political commissar: Kai Feng
  - Chief-of-staff: Zhong Weijian (钟伟剑)
  - Director of the Political Directorate: Liu Shaoqi
  - (Communist) Central (Committee) Local Work Regiment commander: Liu Xiao
- The 9th Legion
  - Commander: Luo Binghui
  - Political commissar: He Changgong
  - Chief-of-staff: Zhang Zongxun
  - Director of the Political Directorate: Wang Shoudao
  - (Communist) Central (Committee) Local Work Regiment commander: Feng Xuefeng

The 5 armies and the 2 columns had a total of 86,859 combatants when they first left their abandoned base in Jiangxi.

=== Weaponry ===
The Statistical Chart of Field Army Personnel, Weaponry, Ammunition, and Supply also provided the weaponry and provisions prepared for the Long March, and the weapons deployed included:

- Artillery: 39 total
  - Mortars: 38
  - Mountain guns: 1 (originally not included, but was added later on)
- Breechloading Firearms: 33,244 total (with 1,858,156 rounds of munition), and of these, a total of 29,016 were distributed to the 5 corps, including:
  - Rifles: 25,317
  - Machine guns: 618
  - Submachine guns: 28
  - Handguns: 2,804

Other weapons included:

- Lances: 6,101
- Chinese sabres: 882

Various weapons were also deployed but their numbers were not counted, and these included:

- Muzzle-loading rifles and smoothbore muskets
- Flintlock and Snaphance guns
- Matchlock and Wheellock guns
- Spears and rakes (although later during the Long March, spears were most useful as canes)
- Axes and polearms (although later during the Long March, poles were most useful as building material such as that for stretchers)
- Daggers and knives

Other material included:

- Provisions
- Winter clothing: 83,100 sets
- Horses: 338
- Herbal medicine: 35,700 kg
- Salt: 17,413 kg

== Economics ==
1.642 million dollars of the Soviet Republic. Out of the Soviet's stamps, most are imperforate and are printed on white newspaper-quality paper. The numerals printed on the stamp are of the complex style to prevent forgery. They are quite rare today, with prices ranging from US$1,000 to over $25,000.

When the Long March began in October 1934, the Communist bank was part of the retreating force, with 14 bank employees, over a hundred labourers and a company of soldiers escorting them while they carried all of the money and mint machinery. One of the important tasks of the bank during the Long March whenever the Chinese Red Army stayed in a place for longer than a day was to tell the local population to exchange any Communist paper bills and copper coins to goods and currency used in Nationalist controlled regions, so that the local population would not be persecuted by the pursuing Nationalists after the Communists had left. After the Zunyi Conference, it was decided that carrying the entire bank on the march was not practical, so on January 29, 1935, at Tucheng, the bank employees burned all Communist paper bills and mint machinery under order. By the time the Long March had concluded in October 1935, only 8 out of the 14 original employees survived; the other 6 had died along the way.

The mint also produced China Soviet Silver Dollars. These dollars have the full name of China Soviet Republic and the hammer and sickle inside a globe on the reverse side. Some coins also have the slogan of "Proletarians of all countries, unite!". China Soviet Silver coins are rare. A genuine China Soviet Silver coin should have a fair market value of US$20000-25000 (200,000 China yuan). China Soviet Silver coin is like the Cultural Revolution type of China stamps - historic or cultural item of the PRC. For example, a W7 China Cultural Revolution stamp set has a value of around US$2500–3000. A genuine coin of China Soviet is 8-10 times more expensive but 100 times more difficult to find than the W7 stamp set.

=== Red tourism ===
In 2002, the building of the CSR National Tax Bureau was fixed for visitors.

== See also ==
- Revolutionary base area
- Communist-controlled China (1927–1949)
- Outline of the Chinese Civil War
