= Mo Xiong =

- 莫雄
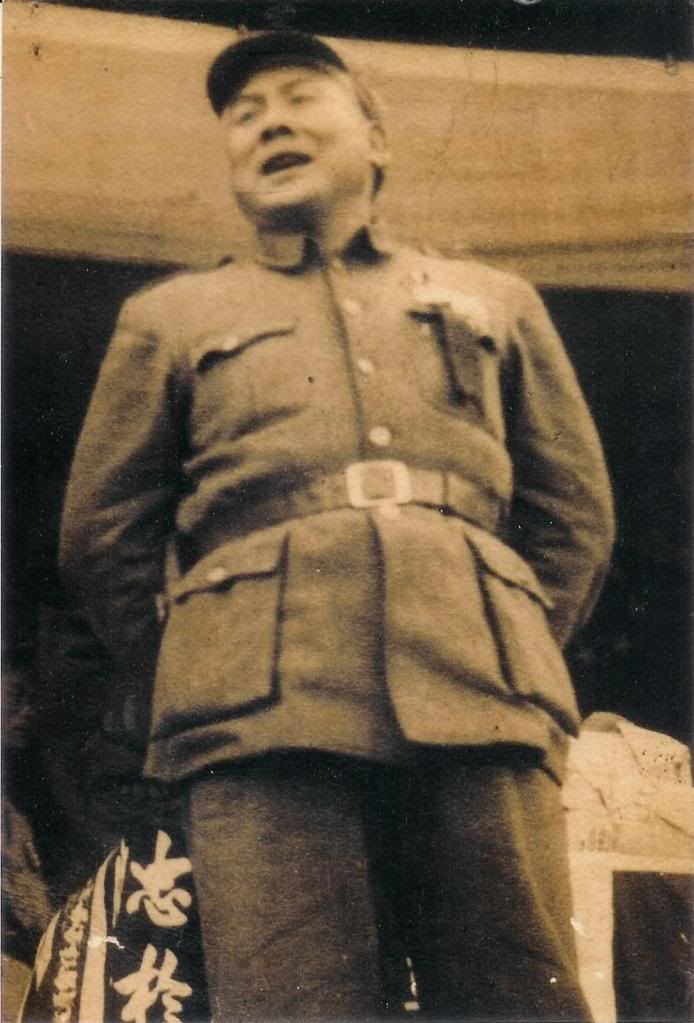
- Born: 1891; Yingde, Guangdong, China
- Died: February 1980 (aged 88–89); People's Republic of China
- Occupation: Military official
- Employer(s): Chinese Communist Party; Nationalist Regime
- Known for: Communist spy in the Nationalist era
- Political party: Chinese Communist Party
- Children: 1 son

Mo Xiong (Chinese: 莫雄; pinyin: Mò Xióng; 1891 – February 1980) was born in Yingde, Guangdong and was a close friend of Sun Yat-sen, and member of Tongmenghui, a member of Kuomintang, and a communist sympathizer / agent. He served high ranking positions in both the Republic of China and the People's Republic of China. In both Mao Zedong's and Zhou Enlai's words, Mo Xiong had saved the Chinese Communist Party and the Chinese Communist Revolution in 1934 when he provided important intelligence on Chiang Kai-shek's military plans, and thus saved the Communists from total annihilation.

== Early work with the Communist Party ==
Mo Xiong was originally an ardent revolutionary, following the footsteps of Sun Yat-sen in his struggle to overthrow the Qing dynasty, such as participating in the Huanghuagang Uprising. Later, he distinguished himself in the National Protection War and campaigns against Chen Jiongming, and as well as the Northern Expedition, steadily rising from regimental commander to brigade commander, and finally to divisional commander. However, Mo became disillusioned with the Kuomintang after witnessing its corruption and power struggles and left the army. With the help of T. V. Soong, in 1930 he managed to get a job in the finance ministry in Shanghai. Due to his leftist nationalistic stand within the Kuomintang, he was sympathetic toward communists. After an accidental contact with Liu Yafo (刘亚佛), a Communist, Mo kept his contact with the Communist Party and eventually asked to join the Chinese Communist Party. The Chinese Communists, however, believing that Mo would be much more valuable if he remained as a non-Communist member, convinced him to give up the idea.

== Rise in status ==
Under the recommendation of Chiang Kai-shek's secretary-general Yang Yongtai (杨永泰), who was unaware of Mo's communist activities, Mo Xiong steadily excelled in Chiang Kai-shek's regime, eventually becoming an important member within Chiang Kai-shek's general headquarter in the early 1930s and by January 1934, Chiang Kai-shek named him as the administrator and commander-in-chief of the fourth special district in northern Jiangxi. Mo used his position to plant more than a dozen communist agents within Chiang's general headquarters, including Liu Yafo (刘亚佛), the Communist who first introduced him to the Chinese Communist Party, Xiang Yunian (项与年) his communist handler, whom he hired as his secretary, and Lu Zhiying (卢志英), the Communist agent who was the acting head of the spy ring.

== Transfer of intelligence ==
After the successful siege of the adjacent regions of Ruijin, the capital of the Jiangxi Soviet, and occupying most of the Jiangxi Soviet, Chiang was confident that he would finish off the Communists in one final decisive strike. In late September 1934, Chiang distributed his top secret plan named "Iron Bucket Plan" to everyone in his general headquarters at Lushan, which detailed the final push to totally annihilate the Communist force. The plan was to build 30 blockade lines supported by 30 barbed wire fences, most of them electric, in the region 150 km (93 mi) around Ruijin, to starve the Communists. In addition, more than 1,000 trucks were to be mobilized to form a rapid reaction force in order to prevent any communist breakout. Realizing the certain annihilation of the Communists, Mo Xiong handed the document weighing several kilograms to his communist handler the same night he received it, risking not only his own life, but that of his entire family.

With the help of Liu Yafo (刘亚佛) and Lu Zhiying (卢志英), the Communist agents copied the important intelligence on four dictionaries and Xiang Yunian (项与年) was tasked to take the intelligence personally to the Jiangxi Soviet. The trip was hazardous, as the nationalist force would arrest and even execute anyone who attempted to cross the blockade. Xiang Yunian was forced to hide in the mountain for a while, and then used rocks to knock out four of his own teeth, resulting in a swollen face. Disguised as a beggar, he tore off the covers of the four dictionaries and hid them at the bottom of his bag with rotten food, then successfully crossed several lines of blockade and reached Ruijin on October 7, 1934. The valuable intelligence provided by Mo Xiong finally convinced the Communists in the Jiangxi Soviet to abandon its base and started the Long March before Chiang could complete the building of his blockade lines with supporting barbed wire fences, and mobilizing trucks and troops, thus saving themselves from total annihilation. The intelligence was so secret that only Zhou Enlai, Bo Gu and Otto Braun (Li De) of the three men committee of the Communist leadership had known about it, not even Mao Zedong. On October 10, 1934, the Communist leadership formally issued the order of the general retreat, and on October 16, 1934, the Chinese Red Army begun what was later known as the Long March, fully abandoning the Jiangxi Soviet. Seventeen days after the main Communist force had already left its base, the nationalists were finally aware that the enemy had escaped after reaching the empty city of Ruijin on November 5, 1934.

== Recognition ==
Mao Zedong learned of Mo Xiong's contribution and after the final Communist victory, Mao Zedong and Zhou Enlai personally ordered Mo Xiong to be escorted from Guangzhou to Beijing to witness the national day celebration on October 1, 1956, and Ye Jianying held a special banquet specifically dedicated to him and Xiang Yunian, who was escorted to the capital from Fuzhou. Mo was awarded with high ranking positions in both the provincial and the national Chinese People's Political Consultative Conference. However, what Mo did for the Chinese Red Army was kept a secret by the Chinese government for decades and it was not until the late 1990s was Mo's contribution to the communists were finally allowed to be publicized, well after Mo's death.
