= Lu Zhiying =

Chinese Communist Party intelligence officer

Lu Zhiying (simplified Chinese: 卢志英; traditional Chinese: 盧志英; 1906 – December 27, 1948), original name Lu Zijiang (Chinese: 卢子江), was a Chinese Communist Party intelligence officer.

== Biography ==
Lu was born in Changyi County, Shandong Province. He joined the Chinese Communist Party (CCP) in 1925, and participated in the Northern Expedition under the command of Feng Yuxiang. In 1929, he engaged in intelligence work on behalf of the CCP in Shanghai.

After the September 18 Incident, he went to Xi'an to work for Yang Hucheng. In March 1932, he went to De'an County, Jiangxi Province where he was appointed as chief of staff to Kuomintang administrator Mo Xiong, who was sympathetic to the CCP. In October 1934, Lu and other communists in Mo's staff provided Zhou Enlai with intelligence on the Kuomintang's Iron Bucket Plan against the Chinese Workers' and Peasants' Red Army. Zhou only shared the information with Bo Gu and Otto Braun. The intelligence saved the CCP from being wiped out by Chiang Kai-shek's National Revolutionary Army in Jiangxi and enabled the Long March, which ended in October 1935 at Bao'an (Shaanxi).

In February 1936, Lu went to Guizhou Province to become general services section chief and commissioner of the CCP. During the Second Sino-Japanese War, he was chief of staff to the New Fourth Army in northern Jiangsu Province. After the victory over the Japanese and resumption of the Chinese Civil War in 1946, Lu returned to Shanghai to resume intelligence work for the eventual CCP conquest of the city. Lu, however, did not live to see Shanghai come under CCP control or the creation of the People's Republic of China. On March 2, 1947, he was discovered, arrested and secretly imprisoned by the Nationalist authorities in Shanghai. He was executed toward the end of the following year.
