= Xingguo County =

Xingguo County 兴国县 Hingkwo
- County
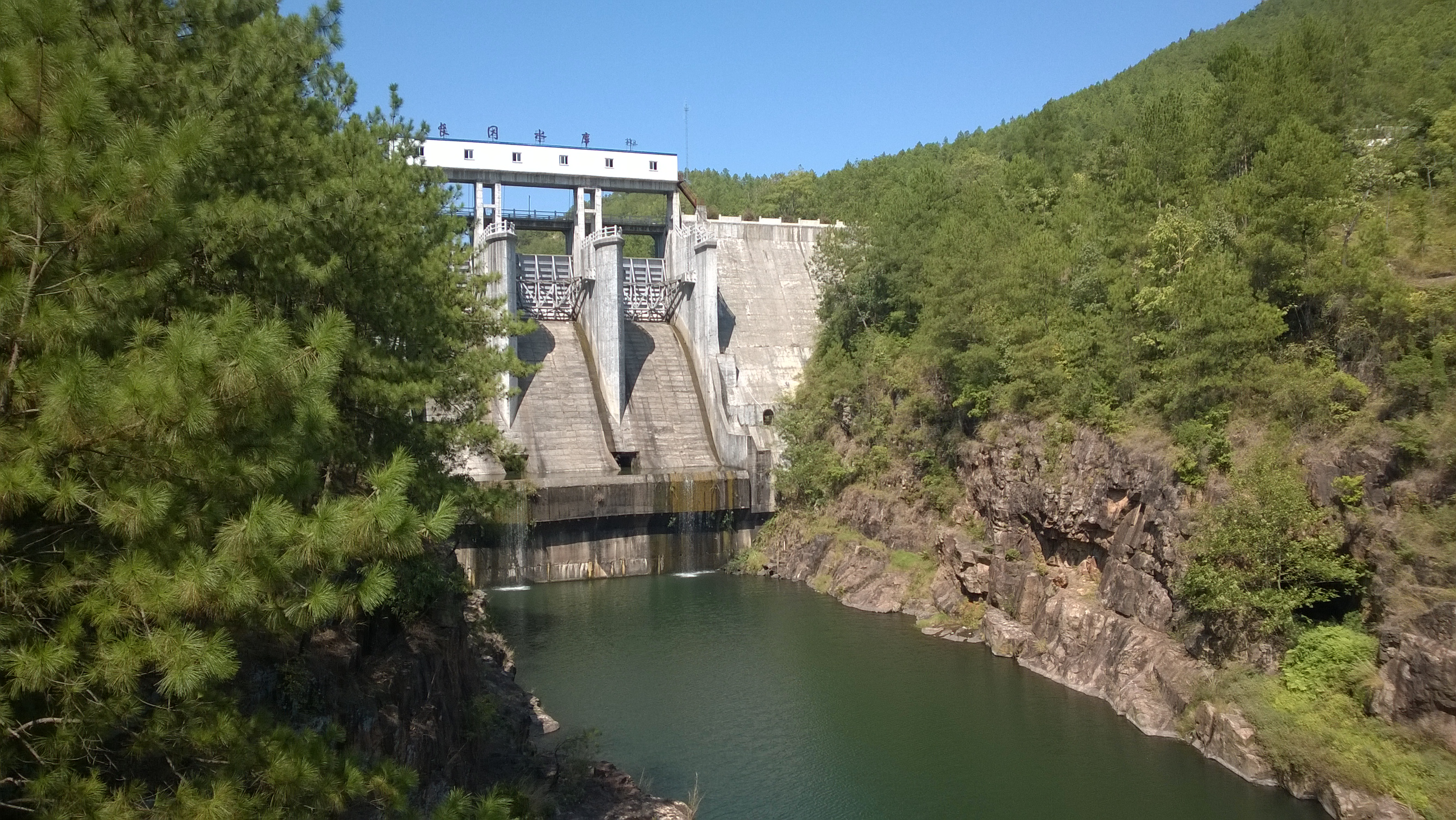
- Dam of Changgang Reservoir
- Nickname: County of Generals (将军县)
- Location of Xingguo County (red) in Jiangxi
- Coordinates: 26°20′02″N 115°20′46″E
- Country: People's Republic of China
- Province: Jiangxi
- Prefecture-level city: Ganzhou
- Seat: Lianjiang (潋江镇)

Area
  - Total: 3,214.46 km^{2} (1,241.11 sq mi)

Dimensions
  - Length: 84 km (52 mi)
  - Width: 71.5 km (44.4 mi)

Population (2010)
  - Total: 719,830
  - Density: 223.93/km^{2} (579.99/sq mi)
- Time zone: UTC+8 (China Standard)
- Postal code: 342400
- Area code: 0797
- Website: www.xingguo.gov.cn

Xingguo County (simplified Chinese: 兴国县; traditional Chinese: 興國縣; pinyin: Xīngguó Xiàn) is a county in south central Jiangxi province, People's Republic of China. It is under the administration of and located in the north of the prefecture-level city of Ganzhou, with a total area of 3,214.46 km^{2} (1,241.11 sq mi). Its population was 719,830 at the 2010 census.

== History ==
In 236 during the Three Kingdoms period Pingyang County was set up in the current area of Xingguo County. In 982 during the Northern Song period the county of Xingguo was set up, named after the Taipingxingguo era (AD 976 – 984) of the emperor of that time.

Xingguo was one of the counties controlled by the Chinese Communist Party in the Jiangxi–Fujian Soviet, a constituent entity of the Chinese Soviet Republic from 1931. Xingguo county was the site of pioneering achievements in land reform, educational reform, and organizational development. Mao Zedong praised these successes as part of "Xingguo Model" in 1934, and they became an important point of reference for other Communist Party policy experiments in the later 1930s and the 1940s.

The county was captured by the Kuomintang forces in 1934 as part of the fifth encirclement campaign.

== Administration ==
As of end of 2019, Xingguo has jurisdiction over 8 towns, 17 townships and 1 economic development zone. The seat of the county locates at the Lianjiang Town.

8 towns

- Lianjiang Town (潋江镇)
- Jiangbei Town (江背镇)
- Gulonggang Town (古龙冈镇)
- Meijiao Town (梅窖镇)
- Gaoxing Town (高兴镇)
- Liangcun Town (良村镇)
- Longkou Town (龙口镇)
- Chenggang Town (城岗镇)

17 townships

- Xingjiang Township (兴江乡)
- Zhangmu Township (樟木乡)
- Dongcun Township (东村乡)
- Xinglian Township (兴莲乡)
- Jiecun Township (杰村乡)
- Shefu Township (社富乡)
- Butou Township (埠头乡)
- Yongfeng Township (永丰乡)
- Longping Township (隆坪乡)
- Juncun Township (均村乡)
- Chayuan Township (茶园乡)
- Chongxian Township (崇贤乡)
- Fengbian Township (枫边乡)
- Nankeng Township (南坑乡)
- Fangtai Township (方太乡)
- Dinglong Township (鼎龙乡)
- Changgang Township (长冈乡)

== Geography ==
The location of Xingguo (in red) within Jiangxi Province.

=== Location ===
Xingguo County locates in the central south of Jiangxi Province, and in the north of Ganzhou prefectural level city. The distance to the center of Ganzhou is about 82 kilometers, and the distance to the provincial capital Nanchang is about 346 kilometers.

=== Topography ===
The length from east to west is 84 kilometers and the width from north to south is 71.5 kilometers. Xingguo is mostly covered by hills and mountains: mountains over 1000 meters on the east, north and west edges, while hilly areas in the center and south parts, with a small basin around the county seat Lianjiang Town. The highest point is the Mount Dawushan at Fengbian Township in the north with elevation of 1204 meters, while the lowest point locates at Mubu Village, Longkou Township in the south with elevation of 127.9 meters.

=== Rivers ===
The rivers in Xingguo are mostly tributaries to Gong River, which forms Gan River together with Zhang River near the city center of Ganzhou.

There are several reservoirs in Xingguo, the largest one being Changgang Reservoir at Changgang Township.

=== Climate ===
Xingguo has a humid subtropical climate. The annual average temperature is 19.0 °C, and the average annual precipitation is 1545 mm.

Climate data for Xingguo, elevation 184 m (604 ft), (1991–2020 normals, extremes 1981–2010)
Month	Jan	Feb	Mar	Apr	May	Jun	Jul	Aug	Sep	Oct	Nov	Dec	Year
Record high °C (°F)	26.4 (79.5)	30.5 (86.9)	31.9 (89.4)	34.7 (94.5)	36.0 (96.8)	37.5 (99.5)	40.4 (104.7)	40.4 (104.7)	37.9 (100.2)	36.5 (97.7)	32.8 (91.0)	26.6 (79.9)	40.4 (104.7)
Mean daily maximum °C (°F)	12.2 (54.0)	15.1 (59.2)	18.3 (64.9)	24.7 (76.5)	28.8 (83.8)	31.3 (88.3)	34.5 (94.1)	33.9 (93.0)	30.8 (87.4)	26.5 (79.7)	21.0 (69.8)	15.0 (59.0)	24.3 (75.8)
Daily mean °C (°F)	7.8 (46.0)	10.3 (50.5)	13.8 (56.8)	19.7 (67.5)	23.9 (75.0)	26.8 (80.2)	29.2 (84.6)	28.5 (83.3)	25.6 (78.1)	20.8 (69.4)	15.3 (59.5)	9.6 (49.3)	19.3 (66.7)
Mean daily minimum °C (°F)	4.9 (40.8)	7.2 (45.0)	10.7 (51.3)	16.1 (61.0)	20.4 (68.7)	23.5 (74.3)	25.1 (77.2)	24.8 (76.6)	21.9 (71.4)	16.8 (62.2)	11.4 (52.5)	6.0 (42.8)	15.7 (60.3)
Record low °C (°F)	−4.5 (23.9)	−3.3 (26.1)	−1.7 (28.9)	3.8 (38.8)	10.0 (50.0)	14.2 (57.6)	19.3 (66.7)	20.3 (68.5)	13.9 (57.0)	5.0 (41.0)	−0.7 (30.7)	−6.3 (20.7)	−6.3 (20.7)
Average precipitation mm (inches)	70.5 (2.78)	92.1 (3.63)	178.4 (7.02)	173.7 (6.84)	230.9 (9.09)	258.7 (10.19)	160.3 (6.31)	163.8 (6.45)	68.6 (2.70)	57.4 (2.26)	74.0 (2.91)	53.1 (2.09)	1,581.5 (62.27)
Average precipitation days (≥ 0.1 mm)	11.2	12.6	17.9	16.4	17.3	16.8	11.5	14.0	8.6	5.9	7.7	8.4	148.3
Average snowy days	1.8	1.0	0.1	0	0	0	0	0	0	0	0	0.5	3.4
Average relative humidity (%)	78	79	82	80	80	80	73	76	76	73	76	75	77
Mean monthly sunshine hours	81.3	82.3	79.5	109.5	129.1	143.3	244.3	216.1	179.9	166.6	134.5	120.4	1,686.8
Percentage possible sunshine	25	26	21	29	31	35	58	54	49	47	42	37	38
Source: China Meteorological Administration

== Demographics ==
According to the official website, the population in 2015 was about 820,000. Xingguo is Hakka area, the ancestors of the population mostly came from Henan, Gansu and other provinces such as Shaanxi, Hebei, Shanxi and Shandong.

There are a small number of She people living in Xingguo. According to the records, there were 810 households and 4419 She people in 1986. Four villages in Xingguo are designated to She people.

== Places of interests ==
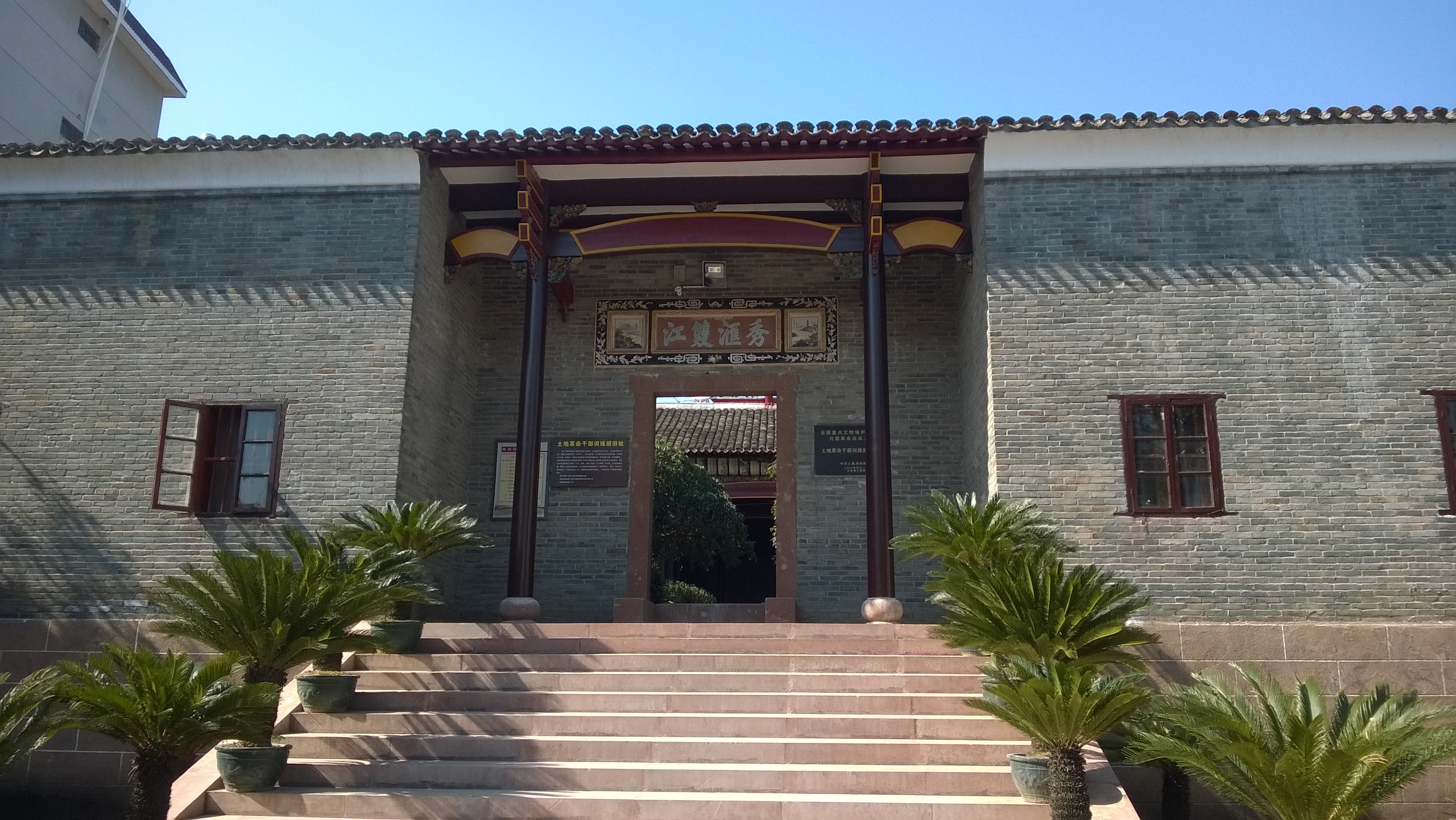
Lianjiang Academy.

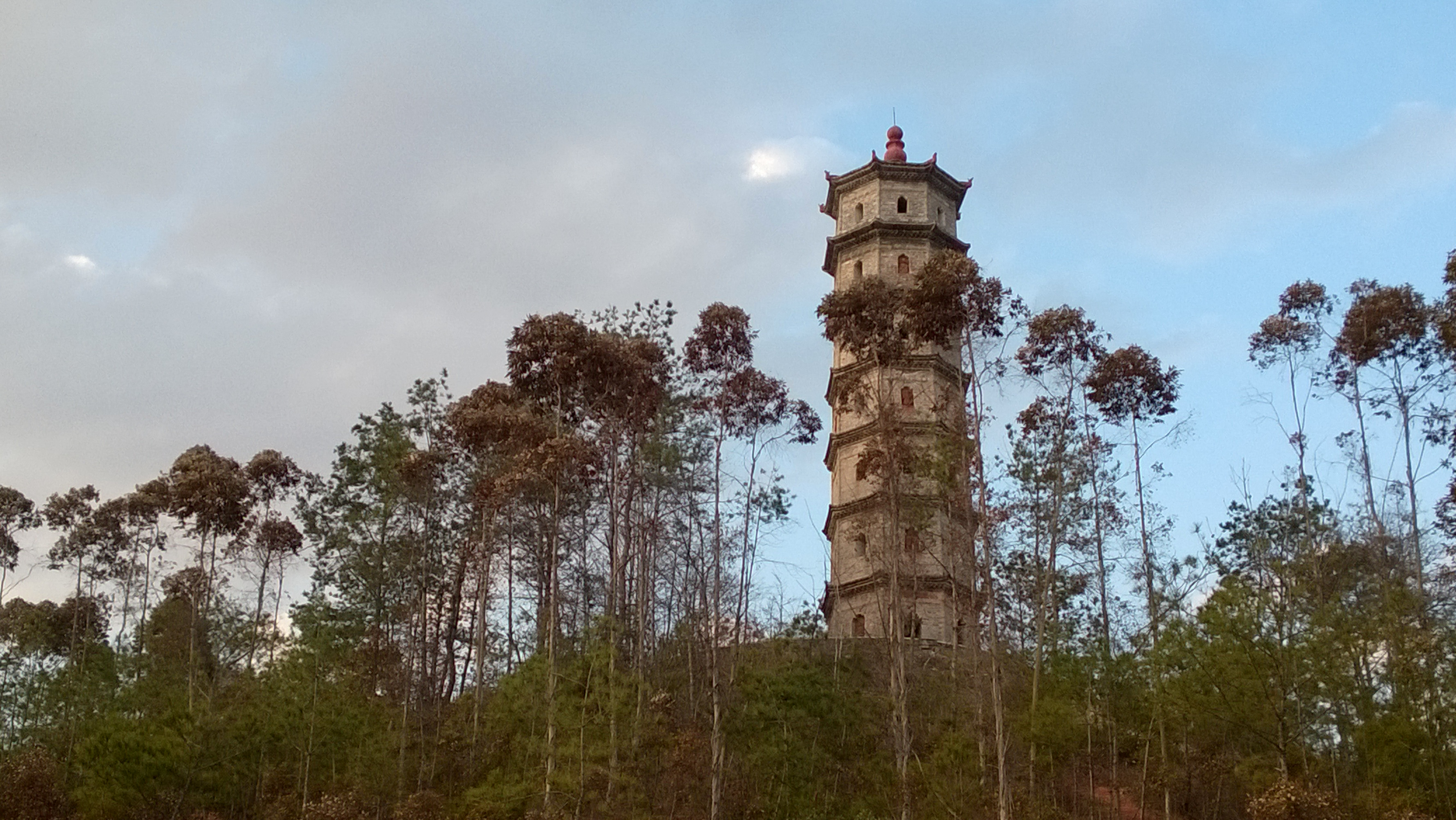
Zhuhua Pagoda.

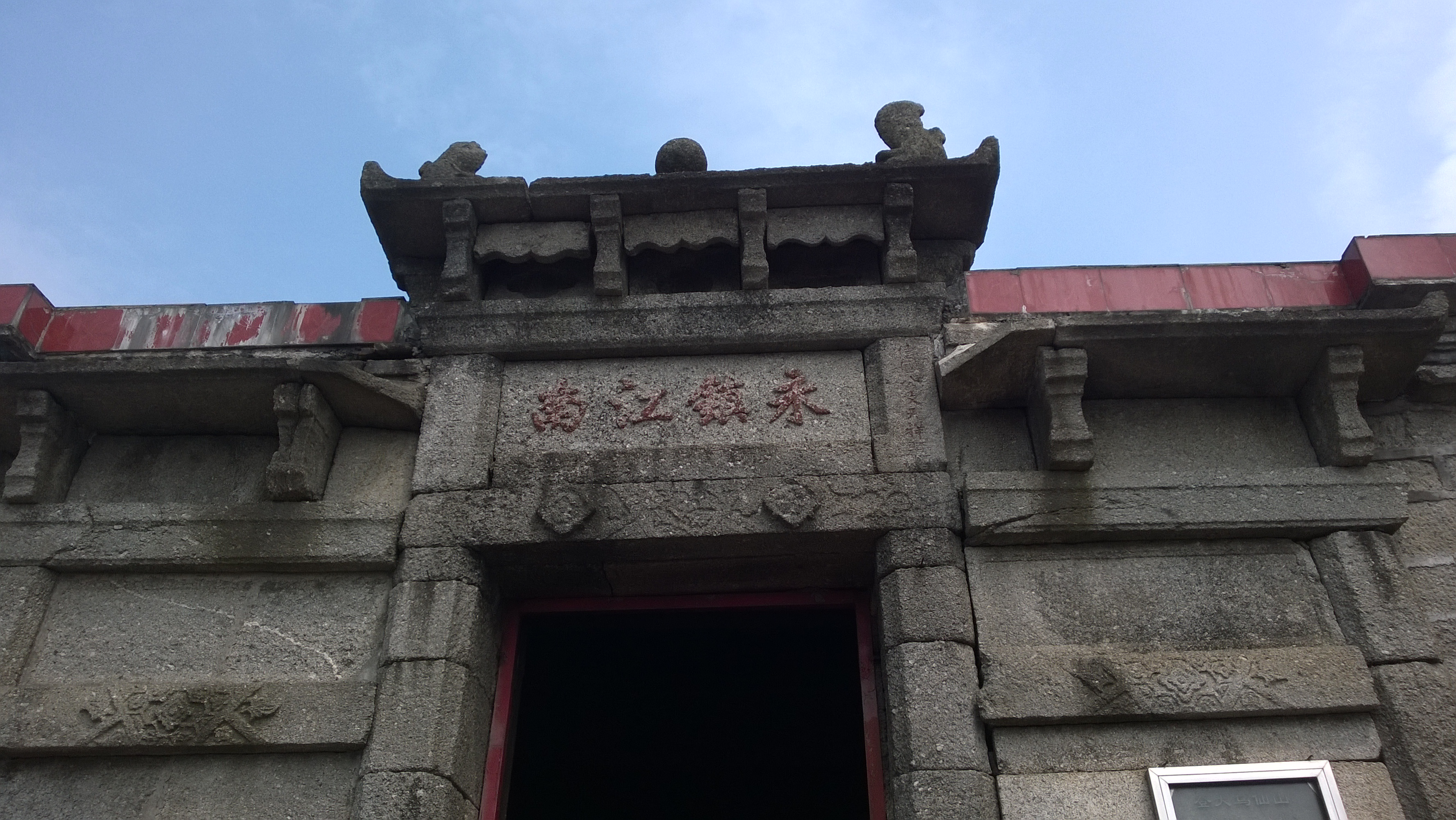
The inscription "Yongzhen Jiangnan" on top of the Mount Dawushan.

The Revolutionary Sites of Xingguo is on the list of Major Historical and Cultural Sites Protected at the National Level. It includes 5 different sites where Mao Zedong, Communist Party, and Red Army had had activities during 1929 - 1933. As a result of these activities, there has been 54 persons from Xingguo appointed as major generals, lieutenant generals, or colonel generals in the army (later additional 2 persons were appointed). So Xingguo is nicknamed as the County of Generals.

In addition, there are 19 historical and cultural sites protected at the provincial level, 9 sites at the prefectural city level, and 25 sites at the county level.

- Lianjiang Academy: Built in 1738 as an academy of classical learning. Mao Zedong held the training class for cadre on land reforms here in 1929. Later it functioned as the seat of the Soviet government of Xingguo County from 1930 to 1934. Protected at the national level as a part of the Revolutionary Sites of Xingguo.
- Zhuhua Pagoda: Initially built during the Tang dynasty, later rebuilt in 1550 during the Ming dynasty. The central pillar is in square shape, which is quite uncommon among pagodas. Protected at the provincial level.
- Inscription "Yongzhen Jiangnan" ("Eternally safeguarding the south of Yangtze") by Wen Tianxiang: It locates in a temple at the top of Mount Dawushan. Protected at the provincial level.
- Bingxin Cave: Scenery with Danxia landform.
- Taipingyan Cave: A cave in Karst landscape area in Meijiao Town.

== Transportation ==
=== Highways and roads ===
- Expressways of China: G72 Quanzhou–Nanning Expressway, Xingguo–Ganxian Expressway
- China National Highways: G238, G319, G356
- Provincial roads: S227, S229

=== Railway ===
There are two railway stations in the county. High-speed services call at Xingguo West railway station and all other services call at Xingguo railway station.

=== Air ===
Both airports are within 100 kilometers distance.

- Ganzhou Huangjin Airport
- Jinggangshan Airport

== Culture ==
=== Hakka culture ===
Xingguo is a settlement for Hakka people, so it has the characteristics of Hakka culture, including the Hakka Chinese language.

=== Folk song ===
In Xingguo there is a unique folk song genre called Xingguo Shan'ge (mountain song).

=== Feng shui ===
Xingguo is also one of the founding places of feng shui philosophy. Sanliao Village in Meijiao Town is known as the First Village of Feng Shui Culture.

== Notable people ==
- Colonel generals: Chen Qihan, Xiao Hua
- Lieutenant general: Qiu Huizuo
- Politicians: Guo Shengkun, Wang Taihua, Yang Shangkui, Zeng Qinghong

== Cuisine and specialities ==
- Xingguo red carp
- Steamed and dried sweet potato
- Xingguo fish noodle: made from fish meat and sweet potato powder.
- Fen long chuang: fish or meat covered by sweet potato powder, together with spicy taro or sweet potato slices and rice noodles, steamed in a big bamboo case. Together with 4 small dishes, Mao Zedong named it as Si xing wang yue (fours stars gazing at the moon).
