= Kun Zhou =

Chinese engineer

Kun Zhou (Chinese: 周昆), an engineer from the Zhejiang University, Hangzhou, China, was named Fellow of the Institute of Electrical and Electronics Engineers (IEEE) in 2015 for contributions to shape modeling and GPU computing.
