= Han Deqin =

Chinese general (1892–1988)

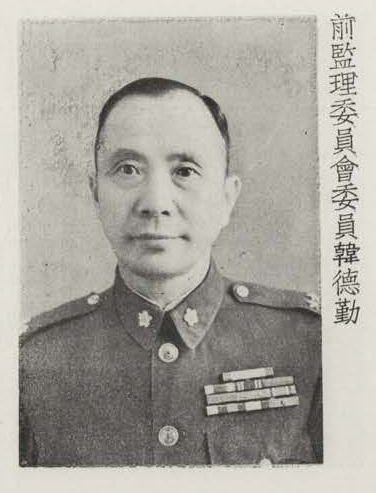
- Han in 1948
- Born: 8 October 1892; Suqian, Jiangsu, Qing dynasty
- Died: 15 August 1988 (aged 95) Taipei, Taiwan
- Allegiance: Republic of China
- Branch: (Republic of China (1912–1949)) National Revolutionary Army
- Conflicts: Xinhai Revolution; Northern Expedition; Central Plains War; Chinese Civil War; Third encirclement campaign against the Jiangxi Soviet; Battle of Huangqiao; Second Sino-Japanese War; Battle of Xuzhou; Battle of Wuhan

Han Deqin (traditional Chinese: 韓德勤; simplified Chinese: 韩德勤; pinyin: Hán Déqín; Wade–Giles: Han Teh-chin; 8 October 1892 – 15 August 1988) was a general of the Republic of China during the Second Sino-Japanese War and the Chinese Civil War. He commanded Nationalist forces the Battle of Huangqiao, the precursor to the New Fourth Army incident, which effectively ended the uneasy Second United Front between the Kuomintang and the Chinese Communist Party.

== Early career ==
Han Deqin was born in Jiangsu in 1892. He entered the Jiangsu Army Primary School in 1909 and participated in the 1911 Revolution against the Qing dynasty. After the establishment of the Republic of China, he returned to school, graduating in 1913. He entered the Baoding Military Academy in 1917, graduating in 1919. He joined the National Revolutionary Army in Guangzhou in 1926 and participated in the Northern Expedition. He then fought in the Central Plains War and was promoted to the commander of the 52nd Division in 1930.

Han was the commander of the Nanchang garrison during the Third encirclement campaign against the Jiangxi Soviet, but his troops were defeated by the Chinese Red Army and he only escaped by pretending to be an unimportant soldier. Han was then demoted to deputy commander of the Second Division and was transferred to Henan. He then served as a member of both the Jiangsu Provincial Government and the Guizhou Provincial Government as well as the general director of the Chongqing branch of the Military Affairs Commission and was promoted to lieutenant general in 1936.

== Battle of Huangqiao ==
After the outbreak of the Second Sino-Japanese War, Han became the chief of staff of the deputy commander-in-chief of the Third War Zone. He also served as the director of the Jiangsu Civil Affairs Department, overseeing guerrilla warfare in the province. In 1938, Han became the deputy commander-in-chief of the 24th Army Group and also acted as the commander of the 89th Army and the 33rd Division. He commanded troops during the Battle of Xuzhou and the Battle of Wuhan. In 1939 he became the chairman of Jiangsu, where he suppressed the local Communist guerrillas. In October 1940, the Communist New Fourth Army attacked Han's troops at Huangqiao, Jiangsu. The Communist forces quickly overran the Nationalists and took over the town. As a response to the battle, Chiang Kai-shek ordered the New Fourth Army to move north of the Yangtze valley, a command that was not followed through. Chiang then used the prior events as a pretext to encircle the New Fourth Army in the subsequent New Fourth Army incident.

== Later career ==
In 1945, Han was promoted to deputy commander of the Third War Zone. After the end of the war with Japan, he was sent to Jiangsu to reincorporate the troops of the Collaborationist Chinese Army back into the National Revolutionary Army. In 1946, Han became the deputy director of the Xuzhou Appeasement Office, and the following year, he became a deputy commander-in-chief of the General Suppression Headquarters of Xuzhou Garrison. After the Kuomintang defeat in the Chinese Civil War, he left for Taiwan and retired in 1952. He died in Taipei on 15 August 1988 at the age of 95.
