= Le'an County =

Le'an County 乐安县 Loan
- County
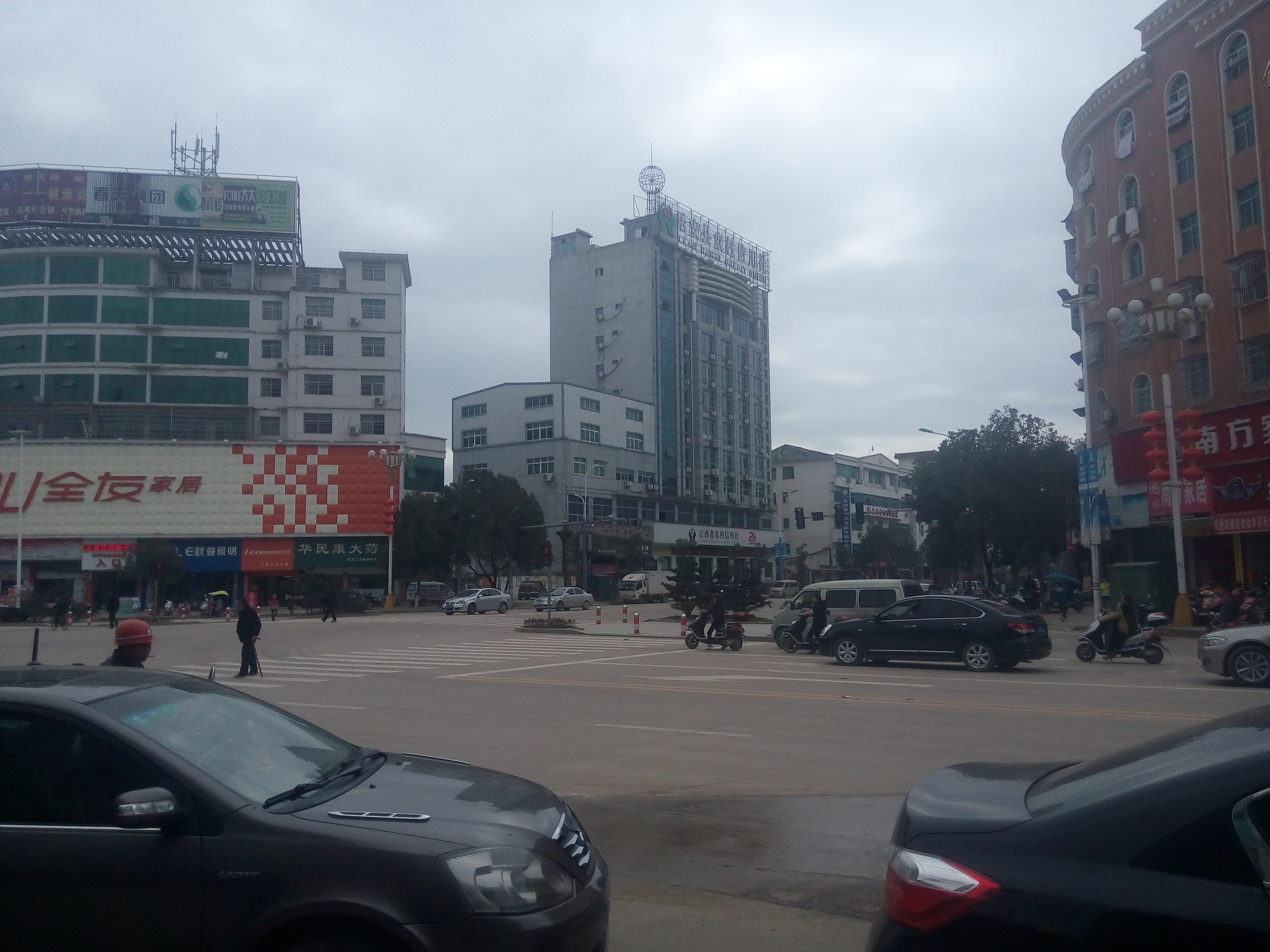

- Coordinates: 27°23′N 115°50′E
- Country: People's Republic of China
- Province: Jiangxi
- Prefecture-level city: Fuzhou

Area
  - Total: 2,412.59 km^{2} (931.51 sq mi)

Population ((2018))
  - Total: 365,000
  - Density: 151/km^{2} (392/sq mi)
- Time zone: UTC+8 (China Standard)
- Postal Code: 344300

Le'an County (simplified Chinese: 乐安县; traditional Chinese: 樂安縣; pinyin: Lè'ān Xiàn) is a county of central Jiangxi province, People's Republic of China. It is under the jurisdiction of the prefecture-level city of Fuzhou.

== Administrative divisions ==
In the present, Le'an County has 9 towns, 5 townships and 1 ethnic township.

9 towns

- Aoxi (鳌溪镇)
- Gongxi (公溪镇)
- Shandang (山砀镇)
- Gongfang (龚坊镇)
- Daifang (戴坊镇)
- Niutian (牛田镇)
- Wanchong (万崇镇)
- Zengtian (增田镇)
- Zhaoxie (招携镇)

5 townships

- Huxi (湖溪乡)
- Luobei (罗陂乡)
- Huping (湖坪乡)
- Nancun (南村乡)
- Gugang (谷岗乡)

1 ethnic township

- Jinzhu She ethic township (金竹畲族乡) (see She people)

== Demographics ==
The population of the district was 335,878 in 1999.

== Climate ==
Climate data for Le'an, elevation 182 m (597 ft), (1991–2020 normals, extremes 1981–2010)
Month	Jan	Feb	Mar	Apr	May	Jun	Jul	Aug	Sep	Oct	Nov	Dec	Year
Record high °C (°F)	26.3 (79.3)	30.7 (87.3)	32.6 (90.7)	35.2 (95.4)	36.3 (97.3)	37.1 (98.8)	40.7 (105.3)	40.0 (104.0)	37.7 (99.9)	35.8 (96.4)	32.0 (89.6)	27.3 (81.1)	40.7 (105.3)
Mean daily maximum °C (°F)	10.2 (50.4)	13.4 (56.1)	17.1 (62.8)	23.7 (74.7)	28.0 (82.4)	30.6 (87.1)	34.1 (93.4)	33.3 (91.9)	29.6 (85.3)	24.7 (76.5)	19.1 (66.4)	13.0 (55.4)	23.1 (73.5)
Daily mean °C (°F)	5.8 (42.4)	8.4 (47.1)	12.2 (54.0)	18.4 (65.1)	22.9 (73.2)	26.1 (79.0)	29.0 (84.2)	28.2 (82.8)	24.7 (76.5)	19.3 (66.7)	13.5 (56.3)	7.7 (45.9)	18.0 (64.4)
Mean daily minimum °C (°F)	2.9 (37.2)	5.2 (41.4)	8.8 (47.8)	14.5 (58.1)	19.1 (66.4)	22.7 (72.9)	24.9 (76.8)	24.4 (75.9)	21.0 (69.8)	15.4 (59.7)	9.6 (49.3)	4.1 (39.4)	14.4 (57.9)
Record low °C (°F)	−6.8 (19.8)	−7.7 (18.1)	−4.8 (23.4)	0.8 (33.4)	8.4 (47.1)	12.0 (53.6)	17.9 (64.2)	18.2 (64.8)	11.7 (53.1)	1.2 (34.2)	−3.2 (26.2)	−11.1 (12.0)	−11.1 (12.0)
Average precipitation mm (inches)	83.4 (3.28)	104.8 (4.13)	204.7 (8.06)	215.3 (8.48)	233.0 (9.17)	294.1 (11.58)	174.8 (6.88)	150.4 (5.92)	78.7 (3.10)	59.2 (2.33)	86.6 (3.41)	65.2 (2.57)	1,750.2 (68.91)
Average precipitation days (≥ 0.1 mm)	13.4	13.9	19.0	17.7	17.0	16.4	11.3	12.1	8.0	7.1	9.8	10.4	156.1
Average snowy days	2.8	1.6	0.2	0	0	0	0	0	0	0	0	0.8	5.4
Average relative humidity (%)	81	81	82	80	79	80	73	76	77	75	78	77	78
Mean monthly sunshine hours	77.2	77.0	78.7	104.7	125.9	127.7	223.1	192.7	149.4	147.0	123.4	116.8	1,543.6
Percentage possible sunshine	23	24	21	27	30	31	53	48	41	42	38	36	35
Source: China Meteorological Administration
