= Jiang Dingwen =

Chinese general (1895–1974)

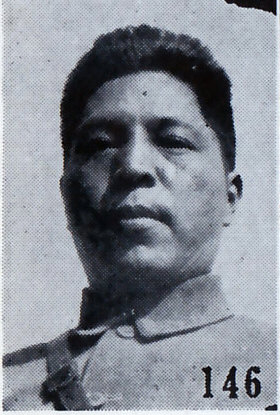
- Born: December 30, 1895; Shaoxing, Zhejiang
- Died: January 2, 1974 (aged 78) Taipei, Taiwan
- Allegiance: Republic of China
- Branch: (Republic of China (1912–1949)) National Revolutionary Army
- Conflicts: Northern Expedition; Central Plains War; Second Sino-Japanese War

Jiang Dingwen (traditional Chinese: 蔣鼎文; simplified Chinese: 蒋鼎文; pinyin: Jiǎng Dǐngwén; December 30, 1895–2 January 1974), courtesy name Mingsan (銘三), was a KMT general from Zhuji, Zhejiang. He was a recipient of the China War Memorial Medal.
