= First encirclement campaign against the Jiangxi Soviet =

Military campaign during the Chinese Civil War

First encirclement campaign
- Part of the Chinese Civil War
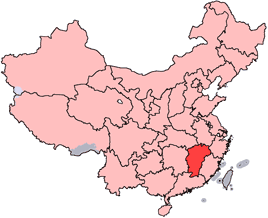
- Location of Jiangxi
Date	November 1930 – January 1931
Location	Jiangxi
Result	Communist victory

Belligerents
Republic of China	Chinese Communist Party

Commanders and leaders
Chiang Kai-shek; Lu Diping; Tan Daoyuan; Zhang Huizan (executed)	Mao Zedong; Zhu De

Units involved
Third Route Army; Sixth Route Army (elements); Ninth Route Army; Nineteenth Route Army (elements); 3 air bombing corps	First Front Army; Irregular troops

Strength
44,000 (initial); 100,000 (final)	40,000

Casualties and losses
15,000 captured	

The first encirclement campaign against the Jiangxi Soviet was a Chinese Civil War offensive by the Kuomintang-led (KMT) Republic of China (ROC, or the Nationalists) against the Chinese Communist Party (CCP, or the Communists) from November 1930 to January 1931. The objective was the destruction of the CCP's autonomous Jiangxi Soviet, which was the main base of the Chinese Red Army. The ROC suffered from inadequate coordination, reconnaissance, and strength. The Communists deliberately withdrew to overextend the KMT's National Revolutionary Army (NRA), permitting the ROC to occupy most of the Soviet by the end of December. The Communist began counterattack began at the end of December, and the campaign ended after the destruction of two NRA divisions. Victory gave the Communists much needed confidence, political support, and supplies. The ROC regrouped for another attack. Communist preparations against the second encirclement campaign were underway by March 1931.

== Names ==
Names for the campaign in English-language histories include the "first encirclement campaign" (or noted as being part of the encirclement campaigns), the "first extermination campaign", and the "First Encirclement and Suppression Campaign" with various capitalizations. The appellations frequently do not include the term "Jiangxi Soviet" (i.e. "First Encirclement Campaign of the Jiangxi Soviet.")

== Background ==
=== Mao's retreat to Jiangxi ===
In 1927, the First United Front collapsed and fighting broke out between the KMT and the CCP. The Communists initially used defectors and Communist-controlled units from the KMT-dominated National Revolutionary Army and worker militias for its armed forces but these were insufficient. The Communists suffered heavy losses from KMT purges and suppressed uprisings, particularly in urban areas where the Communists were ideologically based. By August, the CCP was reorganizing as a clandestine movement to survive. The Communists' rural Autumn Harvest Uprising in September 1927 also failed with heavy losses.

The CCP's 1st Division of the First Workers' and Peasants' Revolutionary Army, led by Mao Zedong, in northeast Hunan survived the Autumn Harvest Uprising. It retreated southward to the Jinggang Mountains (Jinggangshan) on the Hunan-Jiangxi border where in early October it established a base area. In April 1928, they were joined by Zhu De's survivors from the 1927 Nanchang uprising. The two forces merged to create the Fourth Red Army with Zhu as army commander and Mao as party representative. According to Short, Fourth Red Army was the largest CCP force with 8000 troops; Hsu puts the starting strength at 10,000-12,000 troops.

The ROC regularly launched campaigns against the base area starting in late-May. By the fall, the ROC blockade was effective. By December there were critical shortages of food and commodities needed to last the winter; in November, the deteriorating economy caused Mao to develop a contingency plan to retreat to southern Jiangxi. The Communists also learned that the next ROC campaign, the largest yet with 30,000 troops, was imminent. The arrival of Peng Dehuai's Fifth Red Army with 800 troops forced a break-out due to the supply situation. In mid-January 1929, Mao and Zhu broke-out while Peng remained in Jinggangshan as a rear-guard. Mao and Zhu were forced by enemy action to retreat into Guangdong at the end of January instead of clearing a path for Peng. Peng was forced to break-out in late-January or early-February. Enemy action on the march forced him to abandon the sick and wounded.

Mao and Zhu returned north along the Fujian–Jiangxi border. In early February they defeated two pursuing NRA regiments with the aid of Lin Biao's regiment. Peng's survivors rejoined within two weeks. The victory, and the ROC's preoccupation with the Central Plains War and its lead-up, gave the Communists time to recover and expand. By April, the Jiangxi Soviet base area controlled 20 counties in Jiangxi and Fujian. The Fourth Red Army captured an arsenal, absorbed two guerrilla regiments, and recruited 5000 NRA soldiers.

=== Nationalist preparations ===
In August 1930, the ROC established a Field Headquarters in Wuhan to direct counterinsurgency operations in Hunan, Hubei, and Jiangxi.

ROC leader Chiang Kai-shek and General He Yingqin began planning the campaign before September 1930; by that time the KMT was close to victory in the Central Plains War. The plan was to encircle the Jiangxi Soviet and then capture it with advances on Donggu, Longgang and Dongshao; victory was expected within six months. The NRA's 9th Route Army – headquartered in Nanchang and led by Jiangxi governor Lu Diping – was assigned the task; it was augmented by Zhu Shaoling's 6th Route Army and Jiang Guangnai's 19th Route Army. The initial force had 44,000 men (five divisions and three air bombing corp) and may have grown to 100,000 in December. Chiang directed Lu to "drive straight through" and to "advance separately, attack together".

=== Communist preparations ===
The CCP launched the unsuccessful Li Lisan line urban insurrection campaign in mid-1930. The Fourth Red Army and Fifth Red Army were renamed as the First Red Corps and Third Red Corps respectively and subordinated to the new First Front Army commanded by Mao and Zhu. In early October the First Front Army captured Ji'an to consolidate the southwestern territory of the Jiangxi Soviet. The Li Lisan line was ended in part because the Communists learned of the impending encirclement campaign from intelligence captured in Ji'an.

The Communist strategy was decided at the Front Committee meeting at Luofang, 75 miles southwest of Nanchang, in late October. A rejected strategy was to attack Nanchang and Jiujiang, continuing the Li Lisan line, to divert ROC away from and reduce damage to the Soviet. Mao proposed withdrawing eastward into the Soviet. The First Front Army would build-up along the way by recruiting and requisitioning supplies. Irregular forces would be organized to harass the enemy's rear. The pursuing NRA would become overextended and fragmented, and vulnerable to counterattack. He summarized the strategy with the phrase "luring the enemy in deep". Mao reasoned that defeating the NRA in the field would leave the cities undefended against Communist attack. Mao's plan was chosen on 30 October with Zhu's support, and orders were issued the next day.

The strategy required the Red Army to rapidly concentration to generate and exploit tactical superiority. Quick and decisive engagements would reduce demands on the limited supply pool, especially as the Red Army relied heavily on captured supplies. It also required support from the local population, who needed to resist the NRA occupation without Red Army support.

By this time, the First Front Army had 40,000 men. It was a motivated force composed mainly of illiterate peasants; the poor quality of rural recruits and standards of living continued to affect combat readiness. Efforts to improve training and professionalism were underway during the Li Lisan line. These included standards for unit composition and personnel capabilities, standards for officer selection, formal junior officer training, and improvements to staff work. Most troops had modern rifles, but heavy weapons and other modern equipment were in short supply; there were standing orders to capture equipment and technical personnel. The First Red Corps contained the Third, Fourth, Twelfth, Twentieth, and Twenty-second Red Armies; the Third Red Corps contained the Fifth and Eight Red Armies.

Readiness was reduced by continuing internal unrest. From February 1930, the Jiangxi CCP purged suspected ROC agents in the Anti-Bolshevik League incident (AB League), but which also persecuted rich peasants, Li Lisan supporters and Mao's opponents. The purges reached the First Front Army by early November; 4,000 members of the Twentieth Red Army were arrested and over 2,000 were executed. The purges may have increased the discipline and commitment of the survivors.

== Campaign ==
=== Communist withdrawal ===
From 1 November to mid-November the First Front Army withdrew eastward across the Gan River. During this time, members of the Third Red Corps recruited from near Ji’an mutinied against the plan, insisting on occupying the western bank; they were suppressed by Peng. The NRA followed on 18 November; with Third Column (Note: A column is comparable to a corps.) occupying Ji'an in the southwest, First Column occupying Yongfeng and Jishui in the center, and Second Corps occupying Le’an and Yihuang in the east. By 26 November, the First Front Army's had withdrawn further south – to Donggu, Nanlong, and Longgang – and into territory where it had strong local support.

Chiang arrived in Nanchang in December. Two more divisions deployed to enforce the blockade of the Jiangxi Soviet.

The continuing AB League purges led to the Futian incident in early December. A battalion of the Twentieth Red Army mutinied against Mao's leadership when the Twentieth Red Army underwent another round of purges. They freed recently purged members at Futian, established a rival soviet at Yongyang west of the Gan, and denounced Mao for abandoning the Li Lisan line issued by the party center. The Yongyang soviet was suppressed by the Jiangxi Soviet in July 1931. In the meantime, the mutiny weakened the Communists' position and they fell back from the Donggu and Futian areas on 15 December. The Third Red Corps moved to the northern area of Ningdu county.

The NRA detected the Communist political division and attacked. The New Fifth and Eighteenth Divisions were ordered to attack the Donggu area on 16 December. The New Fifth Division arrived at Donggu first and engaged the rearguard of the retreating Red Army. The Eighteenth Division entered later and was unaware of the presence of the New Fifth Division; the two were separated by a ridge line. On 20 December, the Eighteenth Division mistakenly attacked the New Fifth Division for half a day.

=== Communist counterattack ===
By late December, the NRA held most of the Jiangxi Soviet but they were overextended. The Eighteenth Division occupied Donggu, the Twenty-eighth Division occupied Futian, and the Fiftieth Division was advancing on Yuantou. Two thirds of the NRA's Third Route Army was engaged in rear area duties against guerrilla attacks and an uncooperative population.

On 24 December, Third Red Corps moved north to ambush the advancing NRA Fiftieth Division, led by Tan Daoyuan. The NRA detected the trap and halted. The Communists abandoned the plan four days later.

The Eighteenth Division, commanded by Zhang Huizan, planned to attack Longgang with two brigades on 30 December. The Communists learned of the attack from the local population and deployed the First Front Army to destroy the brigades. The Red Army moved into position near the town on the night of 30 December. The NRA entered the town on the morning of 30 December and were trapped by the Communist counterattack. The First Red Corps encircled the town while the Fourth Red Army and parts of the Third Red Corps blocked NRA reinforcements. By the end of the day the Eighteenth Division was destroyed. The Communists captured Zhang, two brigade commanders, 9,000 other prisoners, 5,000 rifles and 30 machine guns.

Lu Diping ordered the NRA to retreat and regroup after the Eighteenth Division's destruction. Fiftieth Division moved south toward Yuantou; the Communists learned of the movement on 2 January and pursued it. The First Front Army caught the Fiftieth Division at Dongshao on the morning of 3 January. The division "disintegrated" under attack from three directions and destroyed. Many NRA troops escaped as Third Red Army did not complete the encirclement in time. 3,000 prisoners and considerable equipment were captured, including a complete signals unit that would be used to form the Red Army's first radio section two weeks later.

== Aftermath ==
Victory gave the Communists increased confidence and regional public support, and validated Mao's strategy. It produced enough captured materiel for the Red Army to continue operations. Over 15,000 prisoners were taken. The Communists were not organized or resourced to keep so many prisoners. Most were released shortly after capture with a little money, which improved the Red Army's image. Individuals of intelligence value were retained. Zhang Huizan was executed and his head sent to the ROC as a warning or a taunt.

ROC after-action review identified problems with the execution of the campaign. Units were unprepared for the campaign. Force strength was inadequate against a mobile enemy in such a large area. Poor coordination between units made providing mutual support difficult, and allowed the Communists to attack units that had become isolated. The findings were applied to planning the second encirclement campaign; the Communists began preparatory operations against the new campaign in March.

== Sources ==
- Dillon, Michael (2010). China: A Modern History. London, United Kingdom: I.B. Tauris. ISBN 978-1-85043-582-2.
- Domes, Jürgen (1985). Peng Te-huai: The Man and the Image. Stanford, California: Stanford University Press. ISBN 0-8047-1303-0.
- Hsu, Wilbur W. (2012). Survival Through Adaptation: The Chinese Red Army and the Extermination Campaigns, 1927-1936 (PDF). Art of War Papers. Fort Leavenworth, Kansas, USA: Combat Studies Institute Press.
- Short, Philip (2017). Mao: The Man Who Made China. New York, New York, USA: I.B.Tauris & Co. Ltd. ISBN 978-1-78453-463-9.
- Uhalley, Stephen (1988). A History of the Chinese Communist Party. Honolulu, Hawaii, USA: Hoover Press. ISBN 9780817986131.
- Van de Ven, Hans J. (2003). War and Nationalism in China, 1925-1945. New York: RoutledgeCurzon. ISBN 0-203-74844-1.
- Worthing, Peter (2016). General He Yingqin: The Rise and Fall of Nationalist China. Cambridge, United Kingdom: Cambridge University Press. ISBN 978-1-316-50781-0.
- Whitson, William W.; Huang, Chen-hsia (1973). The Chinese High Command: A History of Communist Military Politics, 1927-71. London, United Kingdom: MacMillan Press. ISBN 978-1-349-01982-3.
