= Otto Braun (communist) =

German communist writer (1900–1974)

- 李德
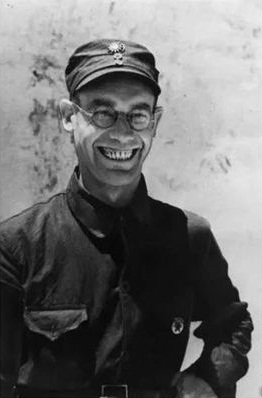
- Otto Braun (Li De) in China
- Born: 28 September 1900; Ismaning, Kingdom of Bavaria, German Empire
- Died: 15 August 1974 (aged 73); Varna, Bulgaria
- Education: Frunze Military Academy
- Occupations: Comintern Agent, Political and Military Adviser
- Employer: Soviet Union
- Organization: Comintern
- Political party: Communist Party of Germany
- Other political affiliations: Chinese Communist Party
- Spouse(s): Olga Benário; Xiao Yehua; Li Lilian

Otto Braun (28 September 1900 – 15 August 1974) was a German communist journalist and functionary of the Communist Party of Germany with a long and varied career. His most significant role was as a Comintern agent sent to China in 1934 to advise the Chinese Communist Party (CCP) on military strategy during the Chinese Civil War. At the time Braun adopted a Chinese name, Li De (Chinese: 李德; pinyin: Lǐ Dé). It was only many years later that it became known that Otto Braun and "Li De" were the same person. He was also the first secretary of the Writers' Union in the GDR.

== Early life ==
Otto Braun was born in Ismaning, Upper Bavaria, near Munich. Even though his mother was still alive, he grew up in an orphanage.

He enrolled at a teachers' training college in Pasing in the Munich area. In June 1918, Braun was drafted into the ranks of the Bavarian army, part of the Imperial German Army, but the First World War ended before he could face combat duty.

After the armistice he went back to complete his studies at the teachers' training college. However, he did not take a job as a primary school teacher. Rather, he joined the newly founded Communist Party of Germany (KPD).

== Communist activity in the 1920s and early 1930s ==
He was involved in the theft of certain sensitive documents from Colonel Freyberg, a White Russian emigrant based in Berlin. He was detained by the police in July 1921 for his part in the matter. He was put on trial but avoided going to jail, and instead, went into hiding.

By that time, he was already a core member of the KPD apparatus by not only regularly writing articles for the party papers but also, after 1924, heading the party's "counter-espionage" efforts. He was also intimately involved in its militia and paramilitary activities.

The police caught up with him again in September 1926. He first served his "Freyberg sentence" of 1922 and then was kept in detention at the Moabit Prison. However, on 11 April 1928, a band of Communists, including his then-lover Olga Benário, succeeded a jail break.

The daring escape received worldwide publicity. Braun and Benário then made their way to Moscow, where they became involved in the Communist International. Both of them were at the Lenin School, which was operated by the Comintern. Braun enrolled in the Frunze Military Academy while Benário worked as an instructor at the Communist Youth International, first in the Soviet Union, then in France and England, where she participated in coordinating anti-fascist activities.

Braun and Benário parted ways in 1931. She went on to marry the famous Brazilian revolutionary leader Luís Carlos Prestes and moved to his country. She was later arrested by the Getúlio Vargas dictatorship and extradited to Germany, where she was eventually taken to the gas chamber at the Bernburg Euthanasia Centre.

Braun went on to become the Comintern representative in China.

== In China ==
In 1932, following his graduation from the Frunze Academy, Soviet Military Intelligence's Fourth Directorate dispatched Braun to Harbin in Manchuria, China. From there he traveled to Shanghai, where he joined the local Comintern bureau. There he was in military affairs under the orders of "General Kleber" (nom de guerre of Manfred Stern), who maintained a "military section" in the city, and in political issues under Arthur Ewert, a fellow German Communist.

However, Shanghai was at that time a backwater in Chinese revolutionary affairs, the local communist movement having been effectively crushed by Chiang Kai-shek's Kuomintang (KMT) in the Shanghai massacre of 1927. The CCP had subsequently retreated to the countryside and started to organize in the province of Jiangxi. In the later part of 1933 Braun arrived in Ruijin, at that time capital of the "Chinese Soviet Republic" set up by the surviving Chinese Communists, where he became a military adviser.

The precise circumstances of his getting this appointment and his activities in the following years are still debated, with some aspects remaining unclear. As noted by Freddy Litten, who thoroughly researched this part of Otto Braun's career, "[Braun]'s memoirs are an important, though dubious, source for the events of these years".

At the time, the Kuomintang, perceiving the CCP as a dangerous threat to its rule, launched a series of vigorous attacks on the CCP in urban areas. Its forces came near to Ruijin, which was in danger of being surrounded and became untenable. The CCP initiated the Long March to escape this danger. Braun, under his assumed Chinese name "Li De", was nearly the only foreigner to participate in the Long March.

In the later part of 1934, Braun/Li De assumed a position of command in the early First Front Army, together with Zhou Enlai and Bo Gu, with authority to make all military decisions. In the Fifth Counter-Encirclement Campaign, Braun advocated for the First Front Army to directly attack the far larger and better-equipped KMT Army. The First Front Army's suffered great casualties, and so CCP forces fell drastically from 86,000 to about 25,000, within a year.

The Red Army was forced, in October 1934, to break out of Jiangxi province and begin the Long March to meet up with other Chinese communist armies to the east. Braun and Bo Gu were still leading the army at this point. In January 1935, after seizing the town of Zunyi, the CCP held the Zunyi Conference to assess their recent defeat. Mao Zedong and Peng Dehuai expressed their opposition to Braun, Bo Gu and their tactics. Mao argued that the direct attacks had cost lives and suggested that smaller and less-well-equipped forces should have run and surrounded the KMT by using the guerrilla tactics for which Mao was to become famed. Mao already distrusted European advisers from the Comintern, especially since in the 1920s advisers such as the Dutch Henk Sneevliet had given disastrous advice to the CCP. Other military wing leaders agreed with Mao, and so Braun and Bo Gu were removed as the military commanders, and Mao became the leader of the Long March. After this conference, the Comintern was pushed aside, and "Native Communists" took control of the CCP.

Braun continued on the Long March along with the CCP. He remained in China until 1939.

In 1933, Braun married Xiao Yuehua, a Chinese Communist Party member. They had a son but later divorced when Otto fell in love with the more beautiful and educated Li Lilian, whom Otto married in 1938. Li Lilian was a Chinese actress and also a member of the Communist Party. On 28 August 1939, Braun left for the Soviet Union and never saw Li Lilian again. Though Braun never returned to China after 1939, he continued to show interest in China's affairs for the rest of his life.

== Soviet period in the 1940s ==
In 1939 Braun arrived in the Soviet Union. At the time, it was a very dangerous place for foreign communists, many of whom, including German communists, were imprisoned, tortured, or killed by Joseph Stalin's secret police (NKVD), despite being completely loyal to the revolutionary cause and having often undergone persecution for its sake in their own countries. Braun managed to avoid such a fate, though he faced some political difficulties immediately upon his arrival.

The Moscow Foreign Languages Press gave him employment as an editor and translator. After the German invasion of the Soviet Union in 1941, use was made of his German antecedents by making him a "polit-instrukteur" striving to turn the loyalty of German officers captured by the Soviets. In that role, he used an old alias from the 1920s, "Kommissar Wagner". He later performed a similar role towards captive Japanese officers as well.

Between 1946 and 1948, he was based at Krasnogorsk, Moscow Oblast, where he lectured in the Antifascist Central School. Afterward, he had another period of working in the Moscow Foreign Languages Press.

== Return to Germany and later years ==
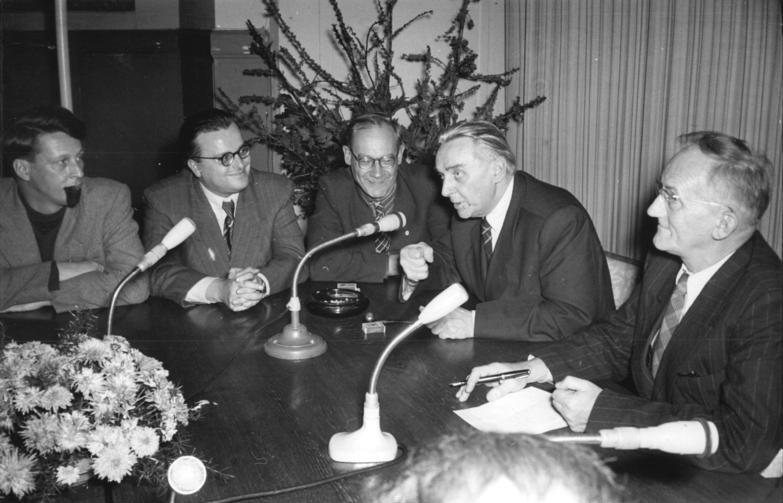
Braun (center) at a meeting of German and Soviet writers and scholars at the Academy of Arts in East Berlin, 22 October 1954

Only after the death of Stalin was Otto Braun allowed to return to his homeland after nearly three decades of exile.

Following his arrival at the German Democratic Republic (East Germany), Braun became a fellow at the Institute for Marxism-Leninism maintained by the Central Committee of the ruling Socialist Unity Party (SED), as the communist party was officially called. His main responsibility was the publication in German of the writings of Vladimir Lenin.

He was First Secretary of the German Writers' Association from 1961 to 1963—when he fell from grace. Already in his mid-sixties, he was for some time a pensioner doing some freelance translation from Russian.

His return to the authorities' good books was evident when, in 1964, the ruling party's organ Neues Deutschland carried the revelation that the otherwise unknown Li De, involved in the Chinese Long March of the 1930s, had been in fact none other than the German Otto Braun.

This gave Braun the possibility and the impetus to write his Chinese Notes. As mentioned, researchers consider these as full of interesting information, particularly useful as offering a different angle to that of official CCP historiography—offering a unique foreign perspective on that revolutionary period. They were written in the late 1960s when Braun was also a fellow of the Institute for Social Sciences. The memoirs were published in book form in 1973 and translated to Chinese, English and other languages.

Braun died at age 74 while on vacation in Varna, Bulgaria. He was buried in East Berlin, and his obituaries appeared in Pravda and in The New York Times.
