= Wang Zhen (general) =

Chinese general known for governing Xinjiang

- 王震
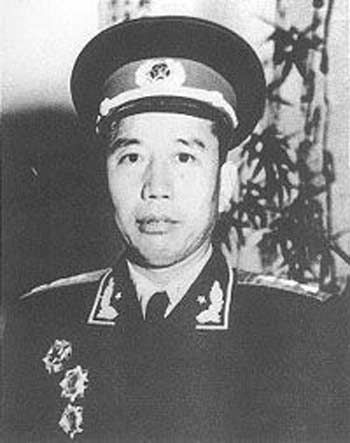
- General Wang Zhen in 1955

Vice President of China
- In office March 15, 1988 – March 12, 1993
- President: Yang Shangkun
- Preceded by: Ulanhu
- Succeeded by: Rong Yiren

Vice Chairman of the Central Advisory Commission
- In office April 1982 – June 1985
- Leader: Deng Xiaoping
- Preceded by: Office established
- Succeeded by: Song Renqiong

Vice Premier of China
- In office January 17, 1975 – September 10, 1980
- Premier: Zhou Enlai; Hua Guofeng

First Secretary of Xinjiang
- In office 1950–1955
- Preceded by: Office established
- Succeeded by: Wang Enmao

Personal details
- Born: April 11, 1908 Liuyang County, Hunan, Qing China
- Died: March 12, 1993 (aged 84) Guangzhou, China
- Party: Chinese Communist Party
- Relations: Wang Jun (businessman) (son)
- Awards: Order of Bayi (First Class); Order of Independence and Freedom (First Class); Order of Liberation (China) (First Class)
- Nickname(s): "Mustachio Wang" (Wáng húzi, 王胡子)

Military service
- Branch/service: People's Liberation Army Ground Force
- Years of service: 1929-1956
- Rank: Colonel General

Wang Zhen
- Chinese: 王震
Transcriptions
Standard Mandarin
- Hanyu Pinyin: Wáng Zhèn

Alternative Chinese name
- Traditional Chinese: 餘開
- Simplified Chinese: 余开
Transcriptions
Standard Mandarin
- Hanyu Pinyin: Yú Kāi

Second alternative Chinese name
- Chinese: 正林
Transcriptions
Standard Mandarin
- Hanyu Pinyin: Zhènglín

Third alternative Chinese name
- Chinese: 建成
Transcriptions
Standard Mandarin
- Hanyu Pinyin: Jiànchéng

Wang Zhen (April 11, 1908 – March 12, 1993), also named Yu Kai (Chinese: 余开), Zhenglin (正林), Jiancheng (建成), and Wang Huzi (simplified Chinese: 王胡子; traditional Chinese: 王鬍子; pinyin: Wáng Húzi), was a native of Liuyang, Hunan. He was a former main leader of the People's Republic of China and the Chinese Communist Party, and also a founding Colonel General of the People's Liberation Army.

He was the 4th Vice President of China and served under President Yang Shangkun. Wang Zhen was the first Vice Chairman to serve in the Central Advisory Commission, under Chairman Deng Xiaoping.

== Biography ==
=== Early career ===
Wang Zhen enlisted in the army in Changsha in 1922. Subsequently, he became a railroad worker, assuming the role of head of the workers' picket line and serving as an executive member of the Changsha section of the Guangzhou–Hankou railway Trade Union, among other positions. Wang Zhen became a member of the Communist Youth League of China in January 1927 and subsequently joined the Chinese Communist Party in May 1927.

=== First Kuomintang-Communist War ===
In 1927, following the collapse of Kuomintang-Communist collaboration and the KMT's systematic extermination of communists, Wang Zhen traversed Changsha and Wuhan, advocating for participation in the workers' movement, clandestine logistics, and military operations. In 1929, he contributed to the establishment of the revolutionary stronghold in Hunan-Jiangxi Border, subsequently holding various positions, including political commissar of the Red Army's First Independent Division of Xiangdong, secretary of the Party Committee of the Division, political commissar of a division within the Red Eighth Army, chief of the Political Department of the Army, and acting commander of the Red Eighth Army. In May 1933, during the Battle of Jiuduchong, he commanded the Red Eighth Army to obliterate over 500 nationalists and capture more almost 1,000 nationalists, so demonstrating his military prowess.

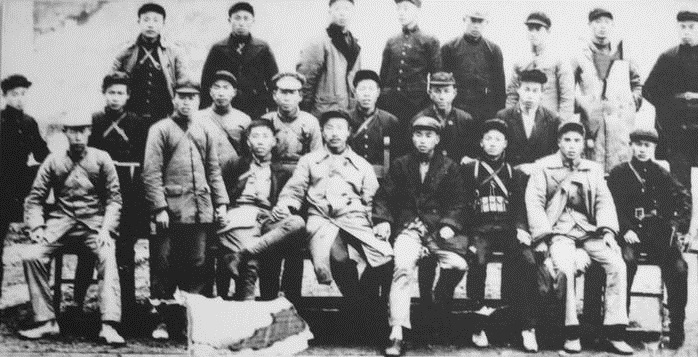
On November 29, 1935, commanders of the Red Sixth Army Corps in Xinhua, Hunan. Front row from left to right: Zhou Renjie, Li Quan, Wang Zhen, Xia Xi, Xiao Ke.

Beginning in July 1934, Wang Zhen held the position of a member of the Military and Political Committee of the Red Sixth Army Corps and worked as a political commissar. Under Ren Bishi's leadership, he conducted a westward expedition alongside army commander Xiao Ke. In October 1934, following the encounter between the Red Sixth Army Corps under their command and the Red Third Army (subsequently reinstated as the Red Second Army Corps) led by He Long and Guan Xiangying, Wang Zhen held positions as a member of the CPC Hunan-Anhui-Sichuan-Guizhou Provincial Committee, a member of the Central Military Commission Branch, and an acting commander of the military region. He participated in commanding the combat involving Battle of Shiwanping and obliterated over 3,000 Kuomintang. He subsequently participated in leading the fights of Chenjiahe, Taozixi, Zhongbao, Banliyuan, among others, while also establishing, strengthening, and solidifying the revolutionary bases of Hunan-Anhui-Sichuan-Guizhou.

In November 1935, when the Kuomintang intensified its encirclement strategy, the Second and Sixth Red Army Corps proactively commenced the Long March. In early July 1936, they encountered the Fourth Red Army in the Garzê region, Sichuan. Subsequently, the Second and Sixth Red Army Corps, along with the Red 32nd Army, established the Red Second Front Army. Wang Zhen, together with Ren Bishi, He Long, and Guan Xiangying, staunchly opposed and resisted Zhang Guotao's division of the Red Army and the Communist Party, and diligently implemented the Party Central Committee's directive to advance northward to combat the Japanese. In October 1936, he arrived in Huining County, Gansu with the Second Red Army, effectively achieving the division of the three principal units of the Red Army.

=== Second Sino-Japanese War ===
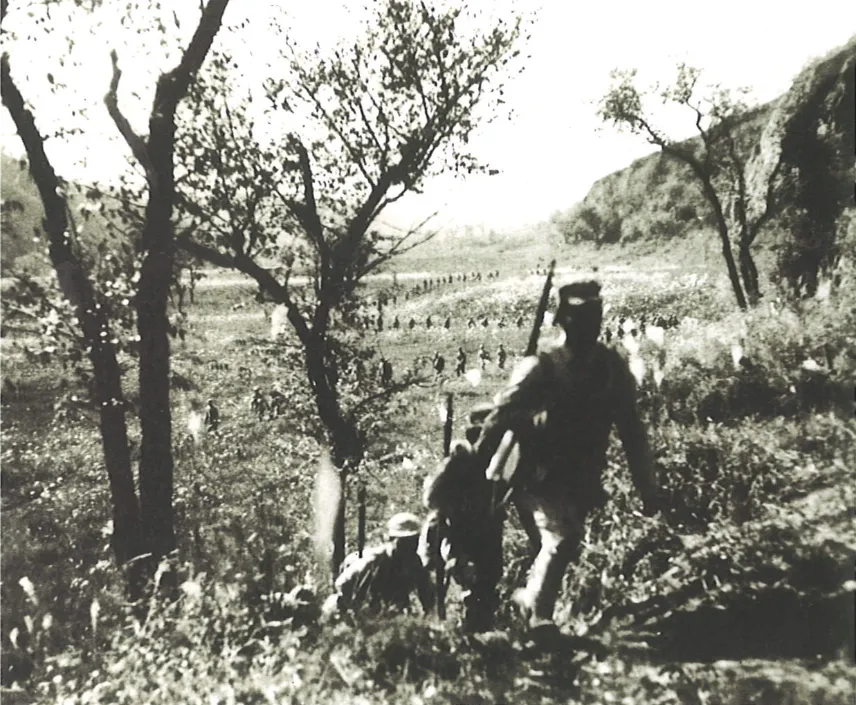
In 1940, the 359th Brigade entered Nanniwan.

Following the commencement of the Second Sino-Japanese War, Wang Zhen held many positions including member of the military and political committee of the 120th Division of the Eighth Route Army, deputy brigade commander of the 359th Brigade of the 120th Division (when Wang was designated a Major General in the National Revolutionary Army), brigade commander, and political commissar. He commanded his forces at the anti-Japanese front in Shanxi, starting in February 1938, successfully recaptured seven counties, including Ningwu, to establish an anti-Japanese regime and a base in northwestern Shanxi. Subsequently, he sent his forces to penetrate the Jin-Cha-Ji Border Region, establishing the anti-Japanese stronghold of Yanbei, situated on Hengshan Mountain. From early 1939 to August, he commanded the 359th Brigade to fight against the Japanese forces in Shanxi. During the confrontation at Xinshuzui, the Japanese executed gas bomb assault; however, they were unable to thwart the advance of the 359th Brigade.

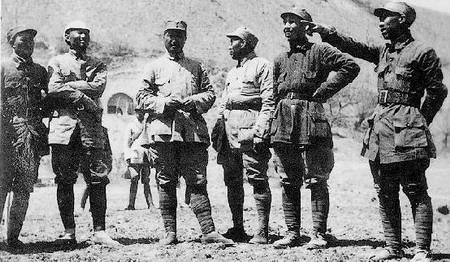
In 1942, Zhu De and He Long, accompanied by Wang Zhen (second from the right), inspected Nanniwan.

In August 1939, to safeguard the Shaanxi-Gansu-Ningxia Border Region, Wang Zhen was instructed to take his forces back to northern Shaanxi, specifically to Suide, Mizhi, and other locations, where he assumed the roles of Suide Police Reserve District Commander and political commissar. During World War II when the Communist base in Northwestern China was blockaded by Kuomintang forces under the command of Hu Zongnan, Wang Zhen gained fame as the Commander of the 359th Brigade for successfully converting waste land in Nanniwan into productive farm land, and the agricultural output not only supported the brigade itself, but also with a substantial surplus to support other parts of the communist base. The success was later lauded by the communists as an example of self-sufficiency. In 1942, he held the positions of secretary of the CPC Yan'an Committee, Commander of the Yan'an Military Sub-District, garrison commander, and oversaw the mass production movement.

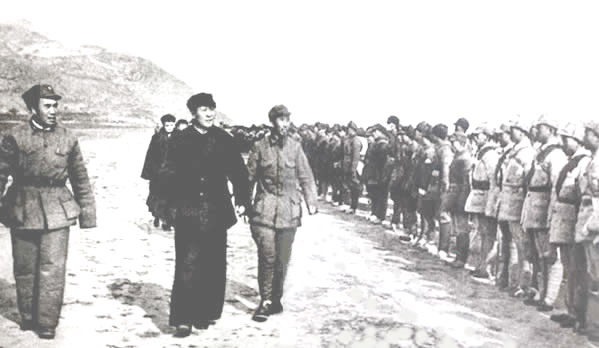
On November 10, 1944, Chairman of the Central Military Commission Mao Zedong, Commander-in-Chief Zhu De, accompanied by Wang Zhen, inspected the Southward Detachment.

In October 1944, the Japanese forces defeated the Kuomintang army in Operation Ichi-Go. Wang Zhen and Wang Shoudao was directed to command the primary contingent of the 359th Brigade to establish the "1st Guerrilla Detachment of the 18th Group Army of the National Revolutionary Army" (also the Southward Detachment of the Eighth Route Army), and proceeded into Hunan-Guangdong-Jiangxi. In January 1945, the detachment encountered Li Xiannian's 5th Division of the New Fourth Army, thereafter proceeded southward, successfully crossed the Yangtze, and reached the Pingjiang and Liuyang regions of Hunan, where it was rebranded as the "Hunan People's Anti-Japanese Salvation Army".

In June 1945, the army continued to advance southward, and when it reached the central part of Hunan, the Japanese surrendered, allowing Chiang Kai-shek to mobilize Xue Yue's forces to besiege this lone Communist army. Upon reaching the Nanxiong region of Guangdong, Wang Zhen's initial strategy of joining the East River Column was disrupted, necessitating his return north to coordinate with the 5th Division of the New Fourth Army and Wang Shusheng's troops in the Henan Military Region, where he concurrently held the positions of Deputy Commander and Chief of Staff of the Central Plains Military Region. During his mission, Wang Zhen was elected as an alternate member of the Central Committee of the Chinese Communist Party at the 7th National Congress of the Chinese Communist Party.

=== Second Kuomintang-Communist War ===
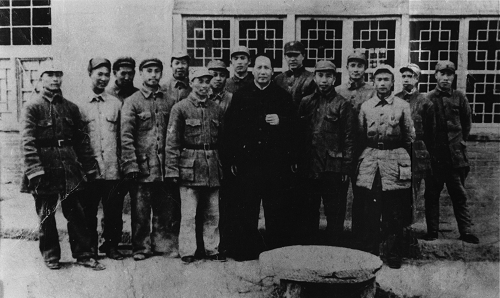
In October 1946, Mao Zedong and the cadres of the Southern Detachment of the Eighth Route Army returning to Yan'an. Wang Zhen is second from the right in the front row.

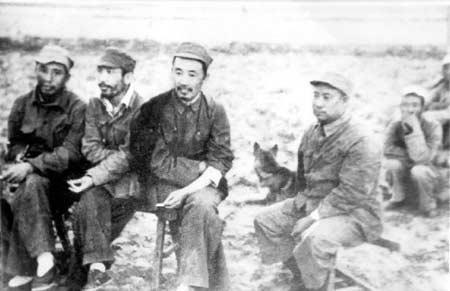
Some PLA generals fighting in Northern Shaanxi in 1947, from left: Wang Zhen, Liu Jingfan, Ma Wenrui, He Bingyan

Following the conclusion of the Second Sino-Japanese War, Wang Zhen held the positions of Deputy Commander and Chief of Staff of the Central Plains Military Region, aiding Li Xiannian in directing a segment of the Central Plains Military Region forces to the Southern Shaanxi (i.e., the Campaign of the North China Plain Pocket). The forces were encircled by ten combined divisions of Hu Zongnan and Liu Zhi at the border of Henan and Shaanxi, subsequently executing many breakouts. In September 1946, the 359th Brigade returned to Northern Shaanxi, having traversed almost 20,000 miles, an expedition referred to by Mao Zedong as the "Second Long March." Subsequently, Wang Zhen traveled to Lüliang for rest and recuperation, assuming the roles of commander and political commissar of the second column of the Jinsui Military Region. By the end of 1946, he collaborated with Chen Geng to initiate the Battle of Lüliang and the Battle of Fenxiao. In March 1947, he directed his forces to cross the Yellow River westward, participating in the defense of Yan'an, and became the Commander and Political Commissar of the 2nd Column of the Northwest Field Army. He achieved consecutive victories in the Battles of North Shaanxi alongside other units, which significantly altered the dynamics of the Northwest Battlefield. During the winter offensive in the Yongfengzhen, Wang Zhen directly led the second column to obliterate over 10,000 troops of the Nationalist Army and seized Li Riji, the commander of the 76th Army of the Nationalist Army.

In 1949, he assumed the roles of Commander and Political Commissar of the 2nd Army of the People's Liberation Army, and during the Second Plenary Session of the Seventh Central Committee of the CPC in March, Wang Zhen offered to advance into Xinjiang. In June, he was elevated to the position of commander and political commissar of the 1st Army Corps, leading his forces in the Battle of Central Shaanxi and successfully capturing Xi'an. He subsequently engaged in the organization and direction of the Battle of Fumei, directing the 1st Army Corps to vanquish four armies of Hu Zongnan's forces. Subsequently, the First Field Army progressed westward, with Wang Zhen directing the 1st Army Corps to bifurcate along the western route, traversing Tongwei, Tianshui, Baoji, and Lintao, ultimately capturing Linxia. The forces then proceeded through Qinghai, defeating the Ma clique, seizing Xining and Zhangye, and advancing towards Xinjiang.

=== Xinjiang ===
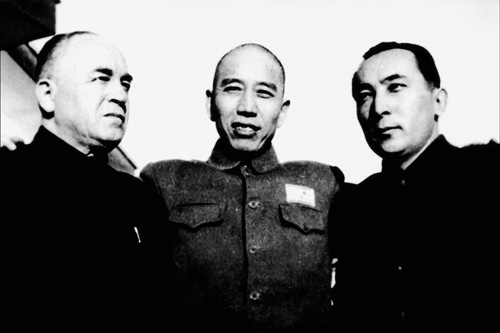
Burhan Shahidi, Wang Zhen and Saifuddin Azizi in December 1949

In 1949, Wang Zhen commanded his forces to seize the Yumen Pass, and on September 25 of that year, the national army in Xinjiang initiated a rebellion, resulting in the peaceful liberation of Xinjiang. On November 7, 1949, the Xinjiang Branch of the CCP Central Committee was officially established, with Wang Zhen appointed as its secretary, a member of the People's Government Committee of Xinjiang, and the Acting Commander and Political Commissar of the Xinjiang Military Region, with headquarters located at Ürümqi. Wang continued to serve as an alternate member of the CCP Central Committee. Simultaneously, he was a member of the Northwest Military and Political Committee, directing the activities of the Northwest Bureau's Xinjiang Sub-Bureau. Wang was also appointed a Vice Chairman of the Sino-Soviet Friendship Association's Xinjiang Branch. When Tao Zhiyue's troops were reorganized into the PLA's 22nd Army Corps, he became its political commissar.

In January 1950, the First Field Army assumed control of the entire Xinjiang territory, and he directed the People's Liberation Army forces in Xinjiang to execute an extensive production campaign, establishing numerous water conservancy projects, cultivating millions of acres of land, and successfully introducing long-staple cotton and sugar beet cultivation for the first time in the Northern Xinjiang. In July 1952, the CIA reported his involvement with the activities of the Sino-Soviet Colored and Rare Metals Joint Stock Corporation and the arrangement of security in mining areas. The Kung Sheung Daily News alleged that Wang was the Chinese commander in Xinjiang "in name only", that his troops have been sent to fight in Korea and reported the use of slave labor, accused of reactionary activities, in the mining sector, where the Soviets have "virtually complete control". On June 28, 1952, Wang Zhen was dismissed from his primary CCP roles, administration, and military due to the Xinjiang Branch's operations in the pastoral regions. He maintained solely the role of commander of the Xinjiang Military Region, and at his proactive recommendation, in 1954, the Central Military Commission concurred to establish the Xinjiang Production and Construction Corps, a structure that persists to this day.

=== Railway Corps ===
The Wang Zhen's Statue in front of the Army Reclamation Museum in Shihezi, Xinjiang, China

In February 1954, Wang Zhen was appointed as the Commander and Political Commissar of the People's Liberation Army Railway Corps, and later that year, he assumed the role of Deputy Chief of Joint Staff of PLA. He commanded the Railway Corps in China's infrastructure development, finishing the over 300-kilometer Litang–Zhanjiang railway in under nine months. He subsequently directed his forces to finish the Yingtan–Xiamen railway, formerly projected to require three years for completion and spanning over 700 kilometers, in under 26 months. In 1955, Wang Zhen received the rank of Colonel General in the People's Liberation Army (PLA).

=== Ministry of Agriculture and Reclamation ===
Beginning in May 1956, Wang Zhen held the position of Minister of the Ministry of Agriculture and Reclamation. In September 1956, he was elected to the Central Committee of the Chinese Communist Party during the 8th CCP Congress. He commanded over 100,000 officers and soldiers in agricultural reclamation, alongside numerous border-supporting youth, engineers, and technicians, to the Junggar Basin in Xinjiang, the Great Northern Wilderness in Heilongjiang, Guangdong, Hainan, Yunnan, and other regions, establishing numerous military reclamation farms and local state-run farms. In July 1958, Bayi University of Reclamation in Heilongjiang was formed, with Wang Zhen serving as the inaugural president. Subsequently, Tarim University was established in October 1958, with Wang Zhen also serving as its honorary president.

=== Beijing ===
Wang Zhen was re-elected as a member of the CCP Central Committee during the 9th and 10th CCP Congress. In 1972, he assumed a role in the operational leadership of the State Council, and in January 1975, he was appointed Vice Premier of the State Council at the First Session of the 4th National People's Congress. He aided Zhou Enlai in economic initiatives and endorsed Deng Xiaoping in his endeavors to reform and advance the national economy. Following the apprehension of the Gang of Four in 1976, Wang Zhen, like Ye Jianying and Chen Yun, advocated for Deng's prompt reinstatement and opposed Hua Guofeng and his "Two Whatevers" policy.

During the 11th and 12th CCP National Congress, Wang Zhen was re-elected as a member of the CCP Central Committee and served on the 11th and 12th Politburo of the Chinese Communist Party. He served as a member of the Standing Committee of the Military Commission of the CPC Central Committee, deputy director of the Central Advisory Committee, and president of the Central Party School in April 1982. He was re-elected as Vice Premier of the State Council during the First Session of the Fifth National People's Congress in 1978. In April 1988, he was elected Vice President of the People's Republic of China during the First Session of the 7th National People's Congress.

He died in Guangzhou on March 12, 1993, at the age of 85, and bequeathed his corneas posthumously. On April 5, 1993, his ashes were dispersed in the Tianshan Mountains of Xinjiang. Foreign obituaries described Wang as one of the harshest and most outspoken critics against political and cultural liberalization among the Chinese leadership. Such views gained him many detractors among Beijing's populace. On April 11, 2008, the CCP Central Committee organized a symposium to commemorate the 100th anniversary of the birth of Wang Zhen, presided over by the then Minister of the Organization Department Li Yuanchao, with then vice-president of the People's Republic of China Xi Jinping delivering a speech.

== Family ==
Wang Zhen was born into a destitute peasant family and received his education under the guidance of his grandfather, who was violently suppressed when Wang Zhen participated in the revolution. Wang Zhen's spouse, Wang Jiqing (Chinese: 王季青), pursued her studies in the History Department at Beiping University. Subsequently, as a result of the Anti-Japanese War, she reached the Taiyuan Office of the Eighth Route Army, where she became affiliated with the 120th Division, overseeing the expansion of the Civilian Transportation Department of the 120th Division. Wang Zhen was introduced by He Long and Guan Xiangying, subsequently marrying Wang Jiqing. Wang Zhen commanded the 359th Brigade in Shanxi, then overseeing Xinjiang and reclaiming Heilongjiang, accompanied by Wang Jiqing. They had three sons: Wang Bing, Wang Jun, and Wang Zhi.

== See also ==
- List of officers of the People's Liberation Army
- Wang Zhen's Former Residence

Political offices
Preceded by Ulanhu	Vice President of China; 1988–1993	Succeeded by Rong Yiren
