= Third encirclement campaign against the Honghu Soviet =

1931 military campaign

- Part of the Chinese Civil War
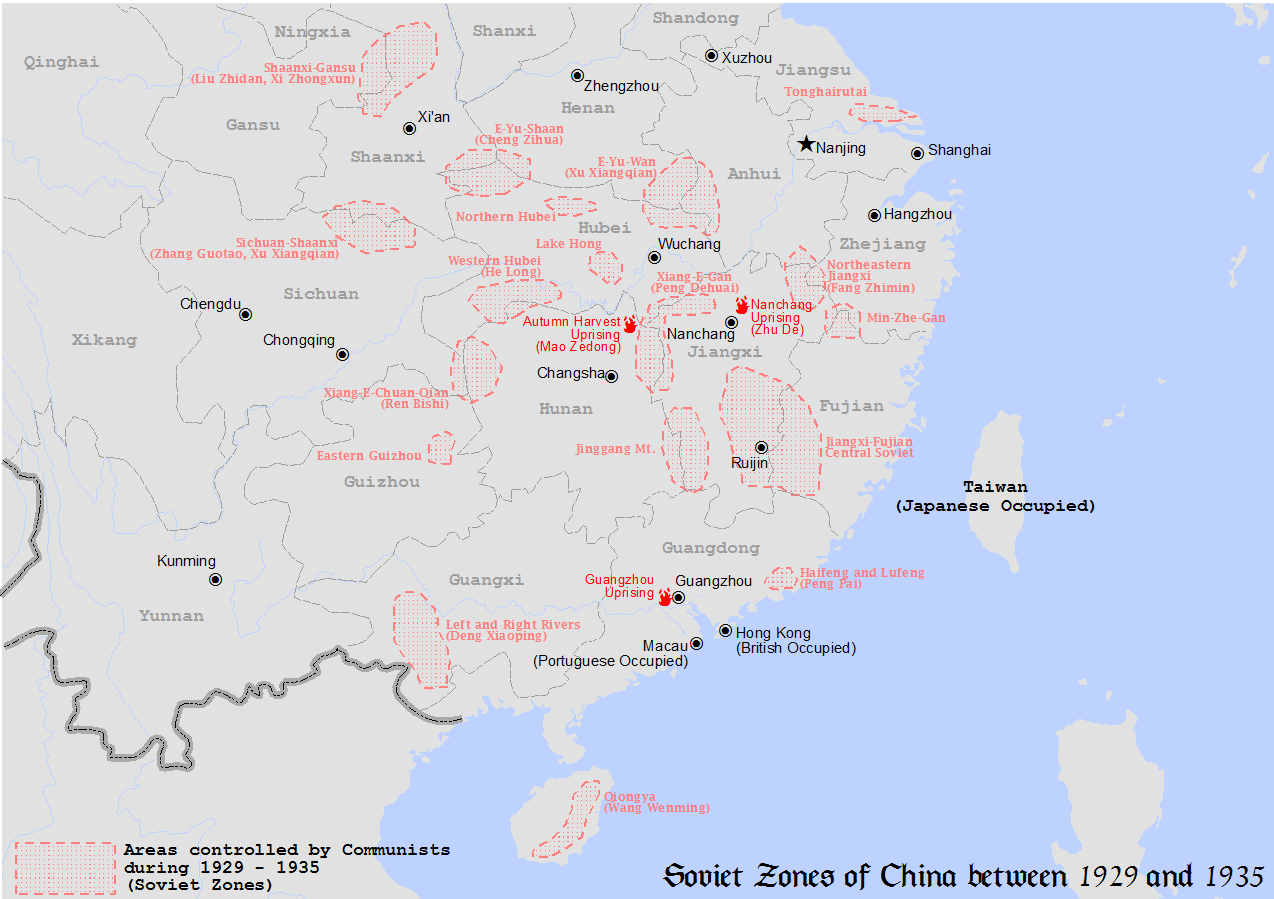
- Location of the Honghu (Lake Hong) Soviet
Date	Early September 1931 – May 30, 1932
Location	Honghu, Jingzhou, China
Result	Communist victory

Belligerents
Nationalist China	Chinese Red Army

Commanders and leaders
Xu Yuanquan	He Long; Xia Xi

Strength
>45,000	15,000

Casualties and losses
Near 10,000	4,000

The third encirclement campaign against the Honghu Soviet was an encirclement campaign launched by the Chinese Nationalist Government that was intended to destroy the communist Honghu Soviet and its Chinese Red Army in the local region. The Red Army successfully defended their soviet republic against the Nationalist attacks from early September 1931 to 30 May 1932.

== See also ==
- Outline of the Chinese Civil War
- National Revolutionary Army
- History of the People's Liberation Army
