= Duan Dechang =

Chinese Red Army general

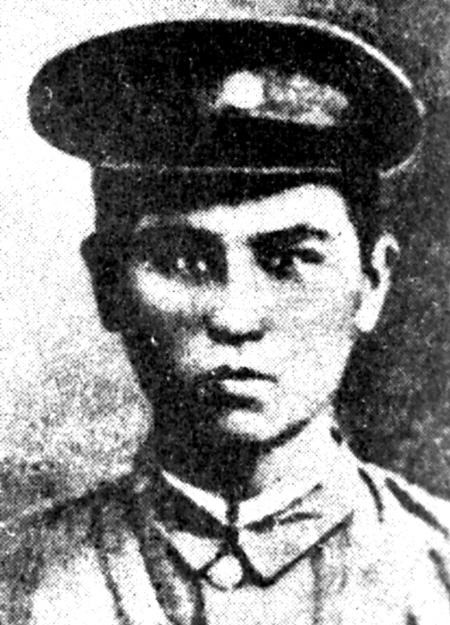
- Born: August 19, 1904; Nan County, Yiyang, Hunan Province, Qing Empire
- Died: May 1, 1933 (aged 28) Badong County, Hubei, Republic of China
- Allegiance: Chinese Communist Party
- Branch: Chinese Workers' and Peasants' Red Army
- Conflicts: Northern Expedition Chinese Civil War: Nanchang Uprising
- Education: Republic of China Military Academy

Duan Dechang (Chinese: 段德昌; August 19, 1904 – May 1, 1933) was a member of the Chinese Workers' and Peasants' Red Army. He was born in Nan County, Yiyang, Hunan Province. He joined the Communist Youth League of China in June 1925 and the Chinese Communist Party (CCP) in September 1925. He participated in the Northern Expedition. Around this time, he met Peng Dehuai. In August 1927, after the beginning of the Chinese Civil War between the CCP and the Kuomintang, Duan participated in the Nanchang Uprising. After its defeat, he went to Gong'an County in Jingzhou, Hubei Province.

In November 1931, he traveled from the Honghu Soviet in Hubei in Ruijin in the Jiangxi Soviet for a conference to coordinate the various Soviets. During the purges carried out by Xia Xi, Duan was one of those who died. He was killed in Badong County, Hubei. After requesting the executioners not to use bullets, he was put to death by the sword.

== Legacy ==
On 10 September 2009, Duan was voted to be one of the 100 heroes who made significant contribution to the establishment of the People's Republic of China. Xu Jishen, another Red Army commander who was killed in the purges carried out by Zhang Guotao and Xia Xi, was also honored as part of the group.
