= Chinese Red Army =

Armed forces of the Chinese Communist Party from 1928 to 1937

Chinese Workers' and Peasants' Red Army
- 中國工農紅軍
- Active: 1911–1949
- Disbanded: 1949
- Country: China
- Allegiance: Chinese Communist Party
- Branch: Central Military Commission
- Type: Army
- Role: Ground warfare
- Headquarters: Jinggang Mountains (1911–1929); Ruijin, Jiangxi Soviet (1929–1937); Yan'an, Yan'an Soviet (1937–1949)

Commanders
- Notable commanders: Mao Zedong; Peng Dehuai; Zhu De

Chinese Workers' and Peasants' Red Army
- Traditional Chinese: 中國工農紅軍
- Simplified Chinese: 中国工农红军
Transcriptions
Standard Mandarin
- Hanyu Pinyin: Zhōngguó Gōngnóng Hóngjūn
- Bopomofo: ㄓㄨㄥ ㄍㄨㄛˊ ㄍㄨㄥ ㄋㄨㄥˊ ㄏㄨㄥˊ ㄐㄩㄣ
- Gwoyeu Romatzyh: Jonggwo Gongnong Horngjiun
- Wade–Giles: Chung^{1}-kuo^{2} Kung^{1}-nung^{2} Hung^{2}-chün^{1}
- Tongyong Pinyin: Jhongguó Gong-nóng Hóng-jyun
- IPA: [ʈʂʊ́ŋ.kwǒ kʊ́ŋ.nʊ̌ŋ xʊ̌ŋ.tɕýn]
Hakka
- Romanization: Tiong-kok Kûng-nùng Fùng-kiûn
Yue: Cantonese
- Yale Romanization: Jūnggwok Gūngnùhng Hùhnggwān
- Jyutping: zung1 gwok3 gung1 nung4 hung4 gwan1
- IPA: [tsʊŋ˥ kʷɔk̚˧ kʊŋ˥ nʊŋ˩ hʊŋ˩ kʷɐn˥]
Southern Min
- Hokkien POJ: Tiong-kok Kong-lâng Âng-kun

Chinese People's Red Army
- Traditional Chinese: 中國人民紅軍
- Simplified Chinese: 中国人民红军
Transcriptions
Standard Mandarin
- Hanyu Pinyin: Zhōngguó Rénmín Hóngjūn
- Bopomofo: ㄓㄨㄥ ㄍㄨㄛˊ ㄖㄣˊ ㄇㄧㄣˊ ㄏㄨㄥˊ ㄐㄩㄣ
- Gwoyeu Romatzyh: Jonggwo Renmin Horngjiun
- Wade–Giles: Chung^{1}-kuo^{2} Jen^{2}-min^{2} Hung^{2}-chün^{1}
- Tongyong Pinyin: Jhongguó Rén-mín Hóng-jyun
- IPA: [ʈʂʊ́ŋ.kwǒ ɻə̌n.mǐn xʊ̌ŋ.tɕýn]
Hakka
- Romanization: Tiong-kok Jîn-bîn Fùng-kiûn
Yue: Cantonese
- Yale Romanization: Jūnggwok Yàhnmàhn Hùhnggwān
- Jyutping: zung1 gwok3 jan4 man4 hung4 gwan1
- IPA: [tsʊŋ˥ kʷɔk̚˧ jɐn˩ mɐn˩ hʊŋ˩ kʷɐn˥]
Southern Min
- Hokkien POJ: Tiong-kok Ngìn-mìn Âng-kun

Abbreviation: Red Army
- Traditional Chinese: 紅軍
- Simplified Chinese: 红军
Transcriptions
Standard Mandarin
- Hanyu Pinyin: Hóngjūn
- Gwoyeu Romatzyh: Horngjiun
- Wade–Giles: Hung^{2}-chün^{1}
- Tongyong Pinyin: Hóng-jyun
- IPA: [xʊ̌ŋ.tɕýn]
Hakka
- Romanization: Fùng-kiûn
Yue: Cantonese
- Yale Romanization: Hùhnggwān
- Jyutping: hung4 gwan1
- IPA: [hʊŋ˩ kʷɐn˥]
Southern Min
- Hokkien POJ: Âng-kun

The Chinese Red Army, formally the Chinese Workers' and Peasants' Red Army (Note: Alternatively, the Chinese Workers' and Peasants' Revolutionary Army) (中國工農紅軍) or just the Red Army (紅軍), was the military wing of the Chinese Communist Party (CCP) from 1911 to 1949. It was formed when Communist elements of the National Revolutionary Army (NRA) splintered and mutinied in the Nanchang Uprising. The Red Army was reincorporated into the NRA as part of the Second United Front with the Kuomintang to fight against the Empire of Japan during the Second Sino-Japanese War of 1937–1945. In the later stages of the Chinese Civil War the Red Army splintered off once again and was renamed the People's Liberation Army.

== History ==
=== Formation ===
Flag of Chinese Workers' and Peasants' Red Army before January 1934.

Prior to the Chinese Red Army's formation, the Chinese Communist Party (CCP) and the Kuomintang were in cooperation through the First United Front from 1924-1927. wherein the Nationalists would allow the Communists to join the Kuomintang. Tensions between the two factions were high from the beginning, but the alliance, originally created as part of a deal in exchange for Soviet aid, was held together in the beginning by the prestige of Sun Yat-sen, who led the coalition. Following his death in 1925, tensions began to rise until in 1927, Chiang Kai-shek's violent purge of communists within the United Front caused tensions to reach a breaking point, and the First United Front was officially dissolved in July of 1927 by the CCP.

Just a few months later, on 1 August 1927, tensions turned into outright rebellion with The Nanchang Uprising. Roughly 25,000 Communist insurgents stormed the Nationalist garrison in the city of Nanchang at 2:00 in the morning, and had control of the city by 9:00 in the morning. Following this uprising, the Chinese Red Army was then created.

In accordance with CCP's plan, the 25,000 insurgents, under the command of General He Long, left Nanchang on August 3 and headed for Guangdong with the intention of establishing a revolutionary government in the city. After one day, Cai Tingkai led the 10th division, nearly a quarter of the forces, away. After three days, heat, hunger, illness, and desertion had cost the force an additional third of its remaining manpower. The army reached the city of Fuzhou on the 7 of August, and stopped there to regroup. Afterwards, they continued their march and took the city of Ruijin, defeating the forces of Qian Dajun. Fearing that the KMT was aware of their route through intelligence from deserters, the insurgent army, now known as the 9th and 20th armies, changed their planned route and marched through Changting and Shanghang. At Changting, the army decided to split their forces, leaving a garrison in the city of Sanheba, and sending a main force to the cities of Chaozhou and Shantou.

After 3 days of fighting and failing to capture the two cities, the main force abandoned Chaozhou and Shantou and concentrated their forces in Tangkeng, with roughly 6,000 Communist insurgents facing 20,000 Nationalist troops. The main force failed to take Tangkeng, and General Zhu De eventually withdrew his remaining 2,500 forces and, following a decision made in a CCP meeting, had half of his forces transferred to the 11th division of the Red Army, and marched his remaining 1,200 to the cities of Haifeng and Lufeng.

In these cities, the 1,200 men joined up with local peasant forces and became the 2nd Red Army Division.

This new force, led by General Zhu De and General Chen Yi, moved into the border region of Guangdong, Jiangxi, and Hunan in order to wage guerilla warfare in late 1927. Zhu and Chen also spent this time consolidating their forces by establishing new party branches in the region. In late April of 1928, Zhu and Chen launched an uprising in Southern Hunan, and led over 10,000 troops to the Jianggang Mountains. Here, they met up with Mao Zedong and his forces to form the 4th Army of the Chinese Red Army, with Zhu commanding the army and Mao acting as party representative.

=== Early success (early 1930s) ===
In early 1930, more red armies were created and the number of red soldiers grew rapidly. By the summer of 1930, the Chinese Red Army had grown to more than 100,000 soldiers and had several base areas, such as in southern and northern Jiangxi, western Hubei, and eastern Hunan, among others. Peng Dehuai's Fifth Army and Yang Youlin's 16th Red Army attacked and occupied Changsha, the capital of Hunan. After the attack, Jiangxi became the largest base area of the Chinese Red Army. In the autumn of 1930, Deng Xiaoping's Seventh Army left its base area in Guangxi.

In 1931, the Chinese Red Army defeated the Nationalist forces three times with a large-scale attack, causing the Nationalist forces to lose nearly 100,000 soldiers. Several smaller red armies came together and formed a group army. In the summer of 1931, General Zhang Guotao arrived at the Fourth Red Army's base area and took over the army. Most of the Fourth Red Army's senior officers were killed by him, including Xu Jishen, Zhou Weijiong, and Xiaofang. Similar movements also occurred in western Hubei; in the spring of 1931, Xia Xi took over He Long's army and killed most of his senior officers including Duan Dechang.

In the fall of 1932, the Nationalist forces gathered 300,000 soldiers to attack the Fourth Red Army. Most of the Nationalist forces' future generals participated in this battle such as Huang Wei, Du Yuming, Sun Li-jen, and others. Having lost more than half of its soldiers, the Fourth Red Army was defeated and had to retreat from its base area. He Long's Third Army also sustained significant loses, with more than 10,000 soldiers losing their lives after leaving western Hubei. During this time, there were also several battles between the Nationalist forces and Jiangxi's First Red Army.

In the spring of 1933, the First Red Army defeated the Nationalist forces' fourth large-scale attack and eliminated two and a half of its elite divisions. Several of the Nationalist forces' generals were also captured. In 1933, the Fourth Red Army arrived at Sichuan and recruited more than 80,000 soldiers. This caused Sichuan's warlord Liu Xiang to gather 200,000 troops to attack the Fourth Red Army in autumn.

=== Defeats (mid 1930s) ===
In 1934, the Nationalist forces purchased new German weapons and launched a fifth large-scale attack on the Red Army's base area in Jiangxi. The First Red Army lost more than 50,000 soldiers in this battle and had to leave Jiangxi to establish a new base. This was the beginning of the Long March. About 30,000 soldiers were left to defend the base areas in southern China. During the same time, the Fourth Red Army defeated Liu Xiang's attacks, who lost more than 80,000 soldiers in battle. Before the First Red Army began the Long March, Xiao Ke's Sixth Legion arrived at eastern Guizhou and joined forces with He Long's Third Army. After this, the Third Army changed its designation to Second Legion.

In the autumn of 1935, the First Red Army arrived in northern Shaanxi with only 6,000 soldiers after losing more than 80,000 along the way. During this same time, the Fourth Red Army moved to northern Sichuan and planned to attack Chengdu. By the end of 1935, they had lost more than 40,000 soldiers and were defeated. Therefore, they were forced to move to southern Gansu and wait for He Long's Second Legion and Sixth Legion to arrive.

=== Formation of a new Army (late 1930s) ===
Western Expedition (1936) In the summer of 1936, the Second Legion, the Sixth Legion and the Thirty-Second Army formed a new group army. It was named the Second Red Army and He Long was tasked with being its commander. The Second Red Army and Fourth Red Army arrived in north Shaanxi in the autumn of 1936. Around the same time, roughly 21,000 soldiers from the Fourth Red Army attacked Gansu, wanting to find a way to the Soviet Union. By the end of 1936, they were defeated by the Nationalist forces' General Ma Bufang, with more than 6,000 soldiers being captured. Only Xu Xiangqian and other senior officers survived. Because of this great failure, the Fourth Red Army's Commander in Chief Zhang Guotao was stripped of his military power.

The Second Sino-Japanese War began on 7 July 1937 with the Marco Polo Bridge Incident. As part of the United Front of the Communists and Nationalists against the invading Japanese forces, the Red Army was incorporated into the National Revolutionary Army, forming the Eighth Route Army and the New Fourth Army.

The First Red Army was integrated into the 115th Division of the Nationalist forces. The Second Red Army was integrated into the 120th Division of the Nationalist forces. The Fourth Red Army was integrated into the 129th Division of the Nationalist forces. These three divisions had 45,000 soldiers in all. 10,000 soldiers were left to defend the base areas in northern Shaanxi. In southern China, the New Fourth Army's 10,000 soldiers acted as a guerrilla force. At the time of the Second Sino-Japanese War, these two armies contained one million armed men.

The Red Army grew rapidly during the war, At the end of the Second Sino-Japanese War, the Red Army had 2 million militia members and 900,000 regular troops.

=== Re-organization into People's Liberation Army ===
In 1947, the Red Army was reorganized into the People's Liberation Army. It continued to operate as a guerilla army reliant on the support of the peasantry. By the time the People's Republic of China was established on 1 October 1949, the PLA had 5.5 million personnel, primarily light infantry.

After the Communist Party assumed power in 1949, veterans of the Red Army were venerated in mainland Chinese culture and are distinguished from those who joined to fight with the CCP after the integration with the Nationalists, or during the second civil war.

In 1954, the relationship between the Party and the military was further institutionalized by the establishment of the Central Military Commission.

=== Major events ===
- 1 August 1927: Nanchang Uprising
- 1927: Autumn Harvest Uprising
- 1927: Guangzhou Uprising
- 1930 to 1931: First Encirclement Campaign
- 1931: Second Encirclement Campaign
- July 1931: Third Encirclement Campaign
- 1932 to 1933: Fourth Encirclement Campaign
- 1933 to 1934: Fifth Encirclement Campaign
- 1934 to 1936: Long March

== Political and ideological roles ==
In the view of the Communist Party, participation of the masses in the Red Army was significant beyond the direct concerns of manpower and material support. It was also viewed as a political process through which the masses would evolve into "masters of the state." According to Mao, "[T]he Red Army is not an entity for fighting only. Its major task (or function) is to mobilize the masses. Fighting is only a means." This process involved the Red Army's significant responsibility for educating, organizing, and mobilizing the masses, functioning like the mobile embodiment of the Communist Party in addition to its military roles. Academic Cai Xiang writes that the Red Army's ability to function in this way helps explain why despite the weak industrial base in revolutionary China, a proletarian party nonetheless successfully developed.

These ideas developed at the 1929 Gutian Congress. The June 1930 Program for the Red Fourth Army at All Levels and the winter 1930 Provisional Regulations on the Political Work of the Chinese Workers and Peasants Army (Draft), which formally established Party leadership of the military.

In the article The Democratic Movement within the Army, written during the Second Sino-Japanese War, Mao Zedong discussed the Red Army's political work and stated, "Through the democratic movement under centralized leadership, we were able to achieve a high degree of political unity, improve lives, and improve military technology and tactics, which are our three main purposes." This view of democracy in the military emphasized democratic centralism and avoiding what the Party deemed "extreme democracy[,] or anarchism."

== Main leadership ==
=== Main leadership of the Red Army headquarters ===
In May 1933, the Chinese Red Army began to build a military regularization system. They established the Red Army headquarters on the front line to command operations.

Military Posts	First Term	Second Term	Third Term
Chairman of the Military Commission	Zhu De (May 1933 to December 1936)	Mao Zedong (December 1936 to July 1937)	
Commander in Chief	Zhu De (May 1933 to July 1937)		
Chief Political Commissar	Zhou Enlai (1933.5 - 1935.6)	Zhang Guotao (1935.6 to July 1937)	
Chief of the General Staff	Liu Bocheng (1933.5 to July 1937)		
Deputy Chief of the General Staff	Zhang Yunyi (1933.5 - 1934.10)	Ye Jianying (1934.10 to July 1937)	
Director of the General Political Department	Wang Jiaxiang (1933.5 - 1935.6)	Cheng Changhao (1935.6 - 1936.12)	Wang Jiaxiang (1936.12 to July 1937)
Deputy Director of the General Political Department	He Chang (1933.5 - 1934.10)	Yuan Guoping (1934.10 - 1936.12)	Yang Shangkun (1936.12 to July 1937)
Director of Security	Li Kenong (1933.5 - 1935.12)	Luo Ruiqing (1935.12 to July 1937)	
Minister of Supply	Ye Jizhuang (1933.5 to July 1937)		
Minister of Public Health	Peng Longbo (彭龙伯, 1933.5 - 1933.12)	He Cheng (1933.12 to July 1937)	
Minister of Military Station	Yang Lisan (1933.5 to July 1937)		

=== Commanders of group armies ===
The Chinese Red Army often claimed they had three group armies, although, by 1931, the Second Red Army was much smaller than the other two.

Army	Military Posts	First Term	Second Term	Third Term
First Red Army	Commander	Zhu De (1930.8 - 1935.10)	Peng Dehuai (1935.10 - 1937.8)	
First Red Army	Political Commissar	Mao Zedong (1930.8 - 1933.5)	Zhou Enlai (1933.5 - 1935.10)	Mao Zedong (1935.10 - 1937.8)
First Red Army	Chief of Staff	Zhu Yunqing (1930.8 - 1931.6)	Ye Jianying (1931.6 - 1937.8)	
First Red Army	Director of Political Department	Yang Yuebin (1930.8 - 1932.6)	Yang Shangkun (1932.6- 1935.10)	Wang Jiaxiang (1935.10 - 1937.8)
Second Red Army	Commander	He Long (1936.7 - 1937.8)		
Second Red Army	Political Commissar	Ren Bishi (1936.7 - 1936.10)	Guan Xiangying (1936.10 - 1937.8)	
Second Red Army	Chief of Staff	Li Da (1936.7 - 1936.10)	Zhou Shidi (1936.10 - 1937.8)	
Second Red Army	Director of Political Department	Gan Siqi (1936.7 - 1936.10)	Zhu Rui (1936.10 - 1937.8)	
Fourth Red Army	Commander	Xu Xiangqian (1931.11 - 1937.8)		
Fourth Red Army	Political Commissar	Cheng Changhao (1931.11 - 1937.8)		
Fourth Red Army	Chief of Staff	Zeng Zhongsheng (1931.11 - 1933.10)	Ni Zhiliang (1933.10 - 1936.4)	Li Te (李特, 1936.4 - 1937.8)
Fourth Red Army	Director of Political Department	Liu Shiqi (刘士奇, 1931.11 - 1932.11)	Cheng Changhao (1932.11 - 1936.4)	Li Zhuoran (1936.4 - 1937.8)

=== Main leadership of base areas ===
In 1930, the Chinese Red Army had established several base areas. Though the designations of the Red Army changed frequently, the main leadership of base areas did not change significantly.

Base Area	Duration	Main Leadership	Remarks
Jiangxi	1929 - 1934	Mao Zedong	
Jiangxi	1929 - 1934	Zhu De	
Jiangxi	1929 - 1934	Bo Gu	
Jiangxi	1929 - 1934	Zhou Enlai	
Northern Jiangxi	1929 - 1934	Kong Hechong	Betrayed in 1934
Northern Jiangxi	1929 - 1934	Fu Qiutao	
Northern Jiangxi	1929 - 1934	Fang Buzhou (方步舟)	Betrayed in 1937
Eastern Jiangxi	1929 - 1935	Fang Zhimin	Died in 1935
Eastern Jiangxi	1929 - 1935	Zhou Jianping	
Eastern Jiangxi	1929 - 1935	Shao Shiping	
Northern Fujian	1929 - 1934	Huang Dao	
Northern Fujian	1929 - 1934	Huang Ligui (黄立贵)	Died in 1937
Northern Fujian	1929 - 1934	Wu Xianxi (吴先喜)	Died in 1937
Western Jiangxi and Eastern Hunan	1930 - 1934	Ren Bishi	
Western Jiangxi and Eastern Hunan	1930 - 1934	Wang Zhen	
Western Jiangxi and Eastern Hunan	1930 - 1934	Xiao Ke	
Western Jiangxi and Eastern Hunan	1930 - 1934	Cai Huiwen	Died in 1936
Western Anhui, Eastern Hubei, and Southern Henan	1930 - 1932	Zhang Guotao	
Western Anhui, Eastern Hubei, and Southern Henan	1930 - 1932	Xu Jishen	Died in 1931
Western Anhui, Eastern Hubei, and Southern Henan	1930 - 1932	Xu Xiangqian	
Western Anhui, Eastern Hubei, and Southern Henan	1930 - 1932	Chen Changhao	
Western Anhui, Eastern Hubei, and Southern Henan	1930 - 1932	Shen Zemin	Died in 1933
Western Hubei	1930 - 1932	He Long	
Western Hubei	1930 - 1932	Zhou Yiqun	Died in 1931
Western Hubei	1930 - 1932	Guan Xiangying	
Western Hubei	1930 - 1932	Xia Xi	Died in 1936
Northern Sichuan	1933 - 1935	Zhang Guotao	
Northern Sichuan	1933 - 1935	Xu Xiangqian	
Northern Sichuan	1933 - 1935	Chen Changhao	
Northern Sichuan	1933 - 1935	Wang Weizhou	
Northern Shaanxi	1932 - 1937	Liu Zhidan	Died in 1936
Northern Shaanxi	1932 - 1937	Xie Zichang	Died in 1935
Northern Shaanxi	1932 - 1937	Xi Zhongxun	
Eastern Guangdong	1930 - 1931	Gu Dacun	
Guangxi	1930 - 1932	Deng Xiaoping	
Guangxi	1930 - 1932	Zhang Yunyi	
Guangxi	1930 - 1932	Li Mingrui	Died in 1931
Guangxi	1930 - 1932	Yu Zuoyu	Died in 1930
Guangxi	1930 - 1932	Wei Baqun	Died in 1932
Hainan	1930 - 1932	Wang Wenming (王文明)	Died in 1930
Hainan	1930 - 1932	Feng Baiju	

== Personnel ==
=== Military rebellion ===
In the early phases of its establishment, most of the Chinese Red Army's military officers were made up of former officers of the Nationalist forces, with most of them joining the Red Army secretly between 1925 and 1928. Many of these officers were killed in the first years of the war. The largest rebellion was the Ningdu Uprising which occurred in the winter of 1931. General Dong Zhentang, head of the 26th Route Army of the National Revolutionary Army and his 17,000 soldiers were the first to join the First Red Army. After the uprising, the Nationalist Party strengthened its control over the army, making launching a military rebellion more difficult. Despite this, General Zhang Guotao, who regarded the former officers of the Nationalist forces with disdain, lead an attack in the summer of 1931 which killed more than 2,500 of the Fourth Red Army's middle and senior officers who originated from the Nationalist forces.

=== Ranks and titles ===
The Chinese Red Army had no ranks. Officers and soldiers were considered equal. Early on, the officers were elected by the soldiers; however, during the later parts of the war this system was eliminated. From regiment to army, the command system at each level had four commanders: commander, political commissar, chief of staff, and director of political department, with the political commissar holding the most power.

=== Recruitment ===
Red Army recruitment efforts often involved mass meetings and competitions between different villages, counties, or mass organizations on the basis of which could supply the most recruits. Women's Organizations were mobilized to provided support to the dependents of Red Army soldiers and to prevent women from "pulling on [their menfolk's] tails" to forestall their enlistment.

Coerced recruiting was explicitly forbidden.

=== Military education ===
As the number of former officers of the Nationalist forces that made up the Red Army decreased throughout the war, the Red Army began to develop military education for the new officers who were formerly farmers. Each base area established its own military academies, usually using captured enemy officers as teachers. The enterprise was very successful, and by 1936 most of the Red Army's military officers were former farmers.

=== Purges ===
In 1931, commanders determined that there were a number of spies in the Red Army. This issue became particularly prevalent when the First Red Army's Chief of Staff Zhu Yunqing was assassinated by a spy in a hospital. After this, each Red Army began to judge and execute the officers and soldiers who were suspected. In 1931, the First Red Army executed about 4,000 men. The Fourth Red Army and Third Red Army also executed thousands of officers, especially senior officers.

=== Militia ===
Typically a Red Army's base area was surrounded by enemy forces. To protect the base area from enemy attack, the Red Army recruited red guards. The red guards were commanded by officers of the local soviet. When large-scale war broke out, the red guards were responsible for the logistical support of the Red Army and supplied new soldiers for the Red Army. For example, in the winter of 1932, Xiao Ke's Eighth Army had 2,200 red soldiers and 10,000 red guards. The red guards' officers were not always loyal. In the spring of 1933, one of the red guards' officers killed 29th Army's commander Chen Qianlun and surrendered to the Nationalist forces.

== Organization ==
Usually each Chinese Red Army's army or legion had three or two infantry divisions. Each division has three infantry regiments and one mortar company. In different time the number of one division's soldiers is different. In the beginning every division had about 1000 or 2000 men. From 1933 to 1936, one division usually had about 5000 or 6000 men.

=== 1928 ===
After several uprisings, the Chinese Red Army had several armies in the summer of 1928.

Province	Order of battle	Commander	Troop strength
Jiangxi	4th Army	Zhu De	6000
Hunan	5th Army	Peng Dehuai	2000
Hubei	2nd Army	He Long	1500
Anhui	11th Army	Wu Guanghao	300

=== 1930 ===
The Chinese Red Army became stronger than before and during the summer of 1930.

Province	Order of battle	Commander	Troop strength
Jiangxi	4th Army	Lin Biao	5000
Jiangxi	6th Army	Huang Gonglue	5000
Jiangxi	10th Army	Fang Zhimin	2000
Jiangxi	12th Army	Deng Yigang (邓毅刚)	3000
Jiangxi	20th Army	Hu Shaohai (胡少海)	1500
Hunan	5th Army	Peng Dehuai	4000
Hunan	8th Army	He Changgong	5000
Hunan	16th Army	Hu Yiming (胡一鸣)	2000
Hubei	4th Army	He Long	2000
Hubei	6th Army	Duan Dechang	8000
Anhui	1st Army	Xu Jishen	2100
Zhejiang	13th Army	Hu Gongmian	3000
Jiangsu	14th Army	He Kun	700
Guangxi	7th Army	Zhang Yunyi	6000
Guangxi	8th Army	Yu Zuoyu	1000

=== 1932 ===
In the summer of 1932, the Chinese Red Army had formed three main forces before the Fourth Encirclement Campaign.

Province	Order of battle	Commander	Troop strength
Jiangxi	1st Legion	Lin Biao	20000
Jiangxi	3rd Legion	Peng Dehuai	18000
Jiangxi	5th Legion	Dong Zhentang	17000
Jiangxi	12th Army	Luo Binghui	7400
Jiangxi	22nd Army	Xiao Ke	2000
Northern Jiangxi	16th Army	Kong Hechong	17000
Eastern Hunan	8th Army	Wang Zhen	2200
Eastern Hunan	12th Division	Ye Changgeng	1200
Eastern Jiangxi	10th Army	Zhou Jianping	4000
Western Hubei	3rd Army	He Long	14000
Western Anhui and Eastern Hubei	4th Army	Xu Xiangqian	30000
Western Anhui and Eastern Hubei	25th Army	Kuang Jixun	12000
Western Anhui and Eastern Hubei	1st Division	Zeng Zhongsheng	3000
Northern Shaanxi	42nd Division	Liu Zhidan	200
Guangxi	21st Division	Wei Baqun	1000

=== 1934 ===
The Chinese Red Army had nearly 200,000 men in the winter of 1934.

Province	Army	Order of battle	Commander	Troop strength
Jiangxi	First Red Army	1st Legion	Lin Biao	22400
Jiangxi	First Red Army	3rd Legion	Peng Dehuai	19800
Jiangxi	First Red Army	5th Legion	Dong Zhentang	12000
Jiangxi	First Red Army	8th Legion	Zhou Kun	10900
Jiangxi	First Red Army	9th Legion	Luo Binghui	11500
Eastern Guizhou	Second Red Army	2nd Legion	He Long	4400
Eastern Guizhou	Second Red Army	6th Legion	Xiao Ke	3300
Sichuan	Fourth Red Army	4th Army	Wang Hongkun	20000
Sichuan	Fourth Red Army	9th Army	He Wei	18000
Sichuan	Fourth Red Army	30th Army	Yu Tianyun	16000
Sichuan	Fourth Red Army	31st Army	Sun Yuqing	16000
Sichuan	Fourth Red Army	33rd Army	Luo Nanhui	10000
Fujian	7nd Army	7th Legion	Xun Huaizhou	6000
Eastern Jiangxi	New 10th Army	New 10th Army	Liu Chouxi	4000
Northern Jiangxi	16th Division	47th regiment	Xu Yangang	1500
Eastern Hubei	25th Army	25th Army	Xu Haidong	3100
Northern Shaanxi	26th Army	78th Division	Liu Zhidan	2000
Western Anhui	28th Army	82nd Division	Gao Jingting	1000

=== 1936 ===
Most of Chinese Red Army had arrived in northern Shaanxi by autumn 1936. Only a minority of them stayed in southern China.

Province	Army	Order of battle	Commander	Troop strength
Northern Shaanxi	First Red Army	1st Legion	Zuo Quan	10000
Northern Shaanxi	First Red Army	15th Legion	Xu Haidong	7000
Northern Shaanxi	First Red Army	28th Army	Song Shilun	1500
Northern Shaanxi	Second Red Army	2nd Legion	He Long	6000
Northern Shaanxi	Second Red Army	6th Legion	Xiao Ke	5000
Northern Shaanxi	Second Red Army	32nd Army	Luo Binghui	2000
Northern Shaanxi	Fourth Red Army	4th Army	Chen Zaidao	9000
Northern Shaanxi	Fourth Red Army	31st Army	Wang Shusheng	7000
Gansu	Western Route Army	5th Army	Dong Zhentang	3000
Gansu	Western Route Army	9th Army	Sun Yuqing	6500
Gansu	Western Route Army	30th Army	Cheng Shicai	7000
Southern Shaanxi	25th Army	74th Division	Chen Xianrui	1400
Western Anhui and Eastern Hubei	28th Army	82nd Division	Gao Jingting	2500
Northern Jiangxi	16th Division	47th regiment	Fang Buzhou (方步舟)	1200
Eastern Fujian	Eastern Fujian Military Command	Independent Division	Ye Fei	1000
Northern Fujian	Northern Fujian Military Command	Independent Division	Huang Ligui (黄立贵)	3000
Southern Zhejiang	Southern Zhejiang Military Command	Independent Division	Su Yu	1600

== Equipment ==
=== Rifles ===
The Chinese Red Army's weapons were all captured from the enemy army, with the most important and useful weapon being the rifle. In the winter of 1934, the First Red Army's twelve divisions had 72,300 soldiers and 25,300 rifles. Compared to the First Red Army, the Fourth Red Army had more rifles which allowed it to recruit many new soldiers in Sichuan. However, the local forces lacked rifles. In the summer of 1934, Xun Huaizhou's Seventh Legion had 6,000 soldiers but only 1,200 rifles, which led to the Seventh Legion's quick defeat when they attempted to attack Fuzhou.

=== Machine guns ===
Every Red Army regiment typically had one machine gun company, with every company having six or more machine guns. The machine gun equipment rate of the Red Army was no less than that of the Nationalist forces' elite troops. This was one of the important reasons why the Red Army was able to defeat the Nationalist forces on many occasions. The most common machine guns were the MG08, ZB vz. 26, M1918 Browning Automatic Rifle, and Hotchkiss M1914 machine gun.

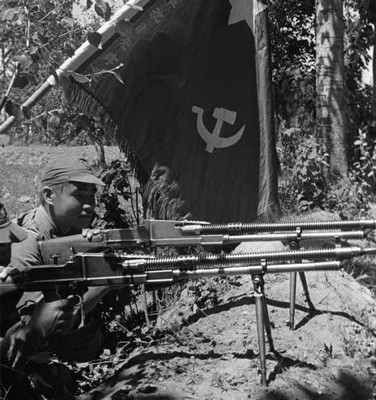
Chinese Red Army's machine guns in 1936.

=== Cold weapons ===
Due to the lack of rifles, the Chinese Red Army was forced to use cold weapons such as broadswords, spears, sabres, and other melee implements. In particular, most of the soldiers from the Red Army's militia troops were armed with cold weapons at all times. In the autumn of 1930, Zeng Zhongsheng commanded 30,000 red guards who were armed with cold weapons. Despite the overwhelming numbers of red soldiers, 1,000 opposing troops armed with rifles were able to defeat Zeng Zhongsheng's forces.

=== Submachine guns ===
The Chinese Red Army used various types of submachine guns from Thompsons to MP 18s. They were captured from the Nationalist forces.

=== Artillery ===
The Chinese Red Army made use of artillery seized from the enemy forces. Most of the time the Red Armies only had mortars, with typically every army having three to five mortars. During the summer of 1930, Peng Dehuai's Fifth Army captured four 75mm mountain guns in Yuezhou, but they lacked the required ammunition.

=== Aircraft ===
In the spring of 1931, the Fourth Red Army captured a Nationalist forces' reconnaissance aircraft in eastern Hubei. The pilot, Long Wenguang, joined the Red Army and assisted them in attacking the enemy army. Before the Fourth Red Army retreated from its base area, the aircraft was concealed by local farmers and was found again in 1951. The First Red Army also captured two reconnaissance aircraft in 1932.

== See also ==
- Outline of the Chinese Civil War
- Outline of the military history of the People's Republic of China
- Zhu De

== Notes ==
Preceded by Communist elements of the National Revolutionary Army	Armed Wing of the Chinese Communist Party; 25 May 1928 – 25 August 1937	Succeeded by Eighth Route Army and New Fourth Army
