= Chen Changhao =

Chinese politician (1906–1967)

- 陈昌浩
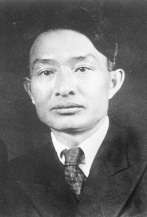
- Chen in Moscow (1950)

Vice Director of the Compilation and Translation Bureau
- In office 1953–1966

Personal details
- Born: 18 September 1906 Hanyang, Wuhan
- Died: 30 July 1967 (aged 60) Beijing
- Party: Chinese Communist Party
- Education: Wuhan University, Moscow Sun Yat-sen University, Central China Normal University
- Nickname: Cangmu

Military service
- Commands: Red Fourth Army, West Army
- Battles/wars: Encirclement Campaigns, Long March

Chen Changhao (simplified Chinese: 陈昌浩; traditional Chinese: 陳昌浩; pinyin: Chén Chānghào; 18 September 1906 – 30 July 1967) was a member of the 28 Bolsheviks and an important military figure of Zhang Guotao's 4th Red Army from Hanyang, Wuhan. Chen had also been known as Cangmu.

== Biography ==
Chen had a childhood education that engraved his solid foundation in Sinology. In 1926, he was able to enroll into the Central China Normal University and in 1927 transferred to the Wuhan University. In the same year, he joined the Communist Youth League of China and following the White Terror in 1927, he enrolled himself to the Moscow Sun Yat-sen University in December. During his stay in Moscow, he became close associates with Wang Ming, Bo Gu and others would later form the 28 Bolsheviks.

Together with Shen Zemin and Shen Demin, he returned to China on 14 November 1930, delivering the Comintern's October letter to Wang Ming. Wang, Chen, and the rest of the 28 Bolsheviks set out to oust Li Lisan from his dominant position in the CCP. They succeeded in doing so at the Fourth Plenary Session in early 1931. The Central Committee then assigned Chen to go with Shen Zemin and Zhang Guotao to take charge of the Eyuwan Soviet, a soviet on the border between Hubei, Henan, and Anhui provinces. They were tasked with bringing the soviet under closer central control. Conflict quickly erupted between the new leadership and the Communists native to the Eyuwan region. In November, Zhang Gutao got Chen appointed Political Commissar of The Red Fourth Army and together they conducted a major purge. Between 2,500 and 10,000 people were purged over the next two years for "counter-revolutionary" activities. Key founders of the Red Forth Army, such as Xu Jishen and Zhou Weijiong, were among those purged.

In November 1931, during the battle of Huang'an, Chen took part in a flight mission over the Nationalist Army on a captured Corsair trainer plane, threw hand grenades' at enemy force below; it's known as the first air operation in the history of Chinese communist force.

On 12 October 1932, Chen and Zhang's Red Fourth Army was forced to leave the Eyuwan Soviet due to a series of military defeats. Consequently, they retreated westwards and set up the Northwest Chinese Soviet Federation. Chen was elected to be an alternate member of the Central Committee in January 1934.

In 1935, Chen was tasked to lead the Red Fourth Army on the Long March, and was to rendezvous in July at Xiaojin County, Sichuan. At the rendezvous with Mao Zedong Red First Army, the Fourth Army had far superior personnel numbers in the scale of eight to one. He entered the Politburo for a short period of time in August, but under the orders of Zhang Guotao to divert away from the route of the march, he led the Red Fourth Army and the Red Thirteenth Army Southwards.

Due to setbacks in the Xikang region, Chen and Zhang went into conflict with each other. In July 1936, Chen urged Zhang to pursue a northern route, influenced by Zhu De, Liu Bocheng and Xu Xiangqian, and by October Chen's force rendezvoused with the main CCP force in Huining, Gansu.

After the failure to implement the "Ningxia Plan", Chen was appointed as Chairman of the Military Committee of the West Army, to lead an attempt with Xu Xiangqian to open a passage to the USSR. However, after a 4-month battle against the Ma Clique in the Hexi Corridor and facing lack of reinforcements, the West Army was crushed. Chen was able to escape under the cover of wounded of the defeated West Army, and returned safely to Yan'an on 16 March 1937. Due to the start of the Second United Front, he returned to the Shaan-Gan-Ning Border Region in mid August 1937.

He became a lecturer at the Central Party School of the Chinese Communist Party and Counter-Japanese Military and Political University following his return to the Shaan-Gan-Ning Border Region. He made a successful request to be sent to USSR for "medical treatment" in August 1939. He was involved in the Battle of Moscow against Hitler's forces in 1941 and contributed to the city's rebuilding. From 1943 to 1952, Chen translated and edited works such as The Collected Works of Lenin and The Russo-Chinese Dictionary which became the de facto textbook for all Chinese students who were studying the Russian language.

In 1952 Chen returned to mainland China and was appointed deputy dean of the Central Institute of Marxism-Leninism. In 1953 he became the vice director of the Compilation and Translation Bureau. Following persecution during the Cultural Revolution, he committed suicide through poison in July 1967. His status was only politically rehabilitated on 21 August 1980.

== Family ==
- First wife: Liu Xiuzhen and had two sons Chen Zuze, Chen Zutao
- Second wife: Zhang Qinqiu, Red Army commander, also committed suicide in 1968
- Third wife: Grania (Russian, divorced in 1960) with one son Chen Zumo
- Fourth wife: Meng Li (married in July 1965)
