= Guan Xiangying =

Chinese communist general (1902–1946)

- 关向应
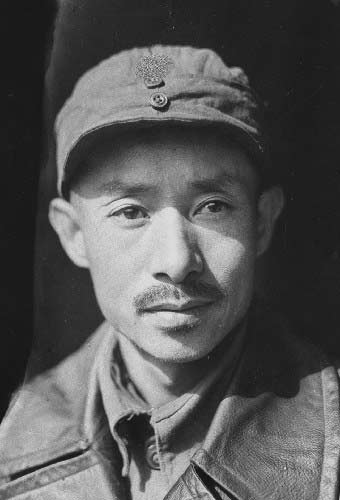

Secretary of the Central Military Commission
- In office March 1930 – August 1930
- Preceded by: Zhou Enlai (as Head of the Military Department)
- Succeeded by: Zhou Enlai

First Secretary of the Central Committee of the Communist Youth League of China
- In office July 1928 – 1930s

Personal details
- Born: 10 September 1902 Jinzhou, Fengtian Province, Qing China
- Died: 21 July 1946 (aged 43) Yan'an Soviet, Republic of China

Military service
- Allegiance: Chinese Red Army; Eighth Route Army
- Years of service: 1924–1946
- Rank: General
- Battles/wars: Chinese Civil War; Second Sino-Japanese War

Guan Xiangying (Chinese: 关向应) (10 September 1902 – 21 July 1946) was a senior military leader of the Chinese Red Army. During the Long March, he served as Vice Political Commissar of the Red Second Front Army and during the Second Sino-Japanese War, he was Political Commissar of the 120th Division of the Eighth Route Army, where he helped establish the Jin-Sui Base Area in Yan'an Soviet alongside He Long.

== Early life ==
Of Manchu ethnicity, Guan was born Guan Zhixiang in 10 September 1902 in Jin County, Fengtian Province (present-day Jinzhou District in Dalian, Liaoning). He belonged to the Bordered White Banner and was born into the Gūwalgiya clan. In 1922, he graduated from the local Japanese Fushidai Commercial School and entered a Japanese-owned printing company, where he left soon after having a conflict with Japanese employees.

== Revolutionary career ==
In April 1924, introduced by Li Zhenying, Guan joined the Chinese Socialist Youth League. In May, he traveled with Li to Shanghai, enrolled at Shanghai University, and engaged in covert activities at the First District Party Department of the Kuomintang. In December of the same year, he was sent to study at the Moscow Sun Yat-sen University in Soviet Union. The following year, introduced by Chen Qiaonian, he joined the Chinese Communist Party (CCP) in Moscow. After the May Thirtieth Movement broke out in 1925, Guan requested to return to China and worked in Shanghai. In August, he went to Jinan and Qingdao to oversee local Communist Youth League activities. Early the next year, he returned to Shanghai. Following the April 12 Incident in 1927, he fled to Wuhan. After the July 15 Incident, he was dispatched to Henan to serve as Secretary of the CCP Henan Provincial Committee.

In 1928, he was transferred back to Shanghai and later attended the 6th National Congress of the Chinese Communist Party in Moscow, where he was elected as an alternate member of the CCP Central Political Bureau, a member of the CCP Central Military Commission and Secretary of the Central Committee of the Chinese Communist Youth League. In March 1930, he was appointed Secretary of the Central Military Commission, overseeing military affairs. That winter, he became Secretary of the CCP Central Yangtze Bureau and was transferred to work in Shanghai.

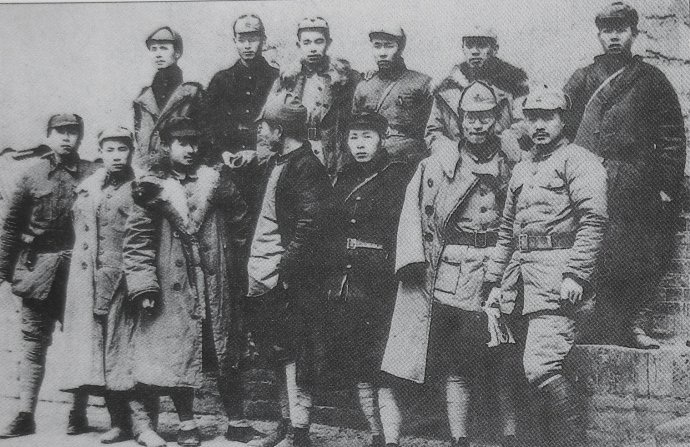
Leaders of the Red Second Front Army after the Long March: front row from left: Guan is in the front third from left

In January 1932, Guan was appointed a member of the CCP Hunan-Hubei-West Revolutionary Base Sub-Bureau, Chairman of the Hunan-Hubei-West Revolutionary Base Military Committee and Political Commissar of the Red Third Army. Together with He Long, he led the construction of the Hunan-Hubei-West Revolutionary Base and the development of the Chinese Red Army. During this period, Guan implemented the expanded line of the anti-counterrevolutionary movement. In October 1934, the troops entered Hunan and established the Hunan-Hubei-Sichuan-Guizhou Revolutionary Base Area, with Guan serving as Vice Political Commissar of the Red Second Army Corps and Military Region. In October 1935, Nationalist leader Chiang Kai-shek led the National Revolutionary Army in a divide-and-encircle offensive against the Hunan-Hubei-Sichuan-Guizhou Revolutionary Base Area. In November, together with He Long and Ren Bishi, he directed the breakout of the Red Second and Sixth Army Corps from the Nationalist blockade in Sangzhi County, Hunan, taking part in the Long March.

In February 1936, in Qianxi County, Guizhou, he attended a meeting of the CCP Hunan-Hubei-Sichuan-Guizhou Provincial Committee, deciding to establish a Sichuan, Yunnan and Guizhou border area base area with the two army corps. Afterward, with He Long and Ren Bishi, he led the Red Second and Sixth Army Corps in maneuvering against the National Revolutionary Army in the Wumeng Mountains. On July 2, the Red Second and Sixth Army Corps arrived at Ganzi, Sichuan, and joined forces with the Red Fourth Front Army under Zhang Guotao and Xu Xiangqian. The Second and Sixth Corps of the Red Army and the 32nd Red Army formed the Second Front Army of the Red Army. Guan served as the deputy political commissar and deputy political commissar of the Second Front Army of the Red Army. During this time, he struggled against Zhang Guotao. In October, the Red Second Front Army met the Red First Front Army at Jiangtaibao in Ningxia, ending the Long March. In December, Guan was appointed Political Commissar of the Red Second Front Army and a member of the CCP Central Revolutionary Military Commission.

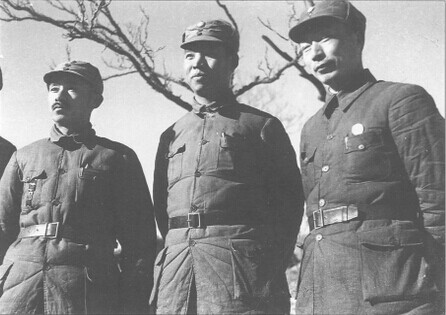
Guan Xiangying, Peng Zhen and Nie Rongzhen in 1938 during the formation of the CCP Northern Bureau

On 22 August 1937, Guan attended the Luochuan Conference in Shaanxi and was subsequently appointed to the CCP Central Military Commission Frontline Sub-Committee. On 25 August, the Red Second Front Army was reorganized into the 120th Division of the Eighth Route Army, with Guan serving as Director of the Political Training Department. Together with He Long, he led the unit in participating in the Second Sino-Japanese War. In October, Guan led a work team to the Jin-Xi region in northwestern Shanxi to develop communist base areas. In February 1938, with He Long, he commanded the Jin-Xi Seven Cities Campaign, recapturing seven county seats. In December 1938, he and He Long led the main force of the 120th Division to the Ji-Zhong area, serving as Political Commissar of the Ji-Zhong District General Headquarters. In February 1940, Guan and He Long led their forces back to Jin-Sui. Starting in November 1940, he served as Political Commissar of the Jin-Xi Military Region and participated in the Hundred Regiments Offensive.

In 1941, Guan's tuberculosis worsened, forcing him to step down and return to Yan'an for recuperation. In 1942, he was appointed Secretary of the CCP Jin-Sui Sub-Bureau and Political Commissar of the Shaan-Gan-Ning Jin-Sui Joint Defense Army. In 1945, at the 7th National Congress of the Chinese Communist Party, he was elected as a Central Committee member.

On 21 July 1946, he died of illness in Yan'an. Prior to his death, he had tearfully pleaded Peng Dehuai to not oppose Mao Zedong or engage in factionalism.

== Personal life ==
Guan's first wife was Qin Manyun, whom he married in June 1928. After returning to China in 1929, she successively served as head of the Women's Department of the Youth League Central Committee, confidential secretary of the Military Commission Secretariat and director of the Liaison Office for Comintern representatives, as well as chief accountant of the Shanghai Central Executive Bureau. They had a son, Guan Zheng, whose whereabouts became unknown.

Guan's second wife was Ma Dan, whom he married on 10 October 1938. In May 1940, Ma went to Xing County to work at the Women's Salvation Association. After the founding of the People's Republic of China, she served as director of the Office of the Guangdong Provincial Civil Affairs Department and deputy director of the Guangdong Provincial Tourism Bureau.

== Honors ==
A memorial hall honoring him was built in 1964 at his birthplace in Jinzhou District in Dalian.

In 2009, Guan was named one of the 100 heroes and role models who contributed to the founding of New China.
