= Zhou Weijiong =

Zhou Weijiong (Chinese: 周维炯; 1908–1931) was a member of the Chinese Workers' and Peasants' Red Army. He was born in Shangcheng County, Henan Province (his birthplace is now part of Jinzhai County, Anhui Province). On May 6, 1929, he was made commander of the 32nd Division, 11th Army in Eyuwan Soviet (southeastern Henan). In May 1930, he was made commander of the 2nd and 3rd Divisions of the Red 1st Army and the 11th Division of the Red 4th Army. In March 1931, he participated in the Battle of Shuangqiaozhen. In August 1931, he participated in the Red Army's capture of Yingshan County. In October 1931, he was executed on the orders of Zhang Guotao at Guangshan, Henan.
