= Wang Jun (businessman) =

Chinese businessman (1941–2019)

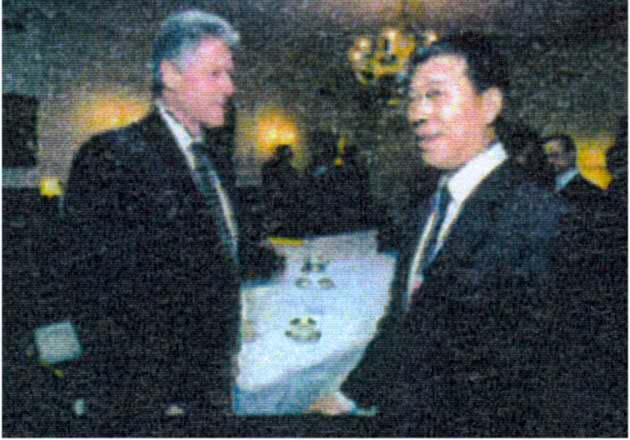
Wang Jun with US President Bill Clinton at the White House in February 1996

Wang Jun (Chinese: 王军; pinyin: Wáng Jūn; April 11, 1941 – June 10, 2019) was a Chinese business executive. He served as Chairman of the Poly Group, a state-owned conglomerate with businesses ranging from arms trading to antiquities. He also served as Chairman the state-owned China International Trust and Investment Corporation (CITIC) and held the rank of a government minister. He retired in 2006 after reaching the age of 65. He was born in Hunan to the Communist revolutionary elder Wang Zhen.

Wang died on June 10, 2019, at the age of 78.
