= He Pengfei =

Chinese admiral (1944–2001)

- 贺鹏飞
- Born: 1944; Yan'an Soviet, Shaanxi, Republic of China
- Died: 28 March 2001 (aged 56–57); Beijing, China
- Education: Tsinghua University
- Military career
- Allegiance: People's Republic of China
- Branch: People's Liberation Army Navy
- Rank: Vice admiral

He Pengfei (simplified Chinese: 贺鹏飞; traditional Chinese: 賀鵬飛; pinyin: Hè Péngfēi, 1944 – 28 March 2001) was a Chinese vice admiral who served as a deputy commander of the People's Liberation Army Navy from 1992 until his death. The only son of Marshal He Long, he headed the equipment department of the General Staff Department of the People's Liberation Army in the 1980s and is described as one of the founders of the arms trading company Poly. As deputy navy commander, he was one of the senior officers who backed the covert purchase of the unfinished Soviet aircraft carrier Varyag from Ukraine, which later became China's first aircraft carrier.

== Early life and education ==
He Pengfei was born in 1944 in Yan'an, Shaanxi, the son of He Long and his wife Xue Ming. He grew up in Beijing and graduated from the Beijing No. 4 High School in 1962. In 1964, he entered the mechanical engineering department of Tsinghua University, and he joined the Chinese Communist Party in 1965.

At the start of the Cultural Revolution in 1966, He Pengfei was among the founders of the Tsinghua University Red Guards, and he headed the university's provisional preparatory committee for the Cultural Revolution. His father was persecuted and died during the Cultural Revolution, and He Pengfei was also persecuted and was detained for a time. According to Voice of America, he and his sister changed their names, went into hiding and worked as sailors on a cargo ship between Tianjin and Shanghai. After graduating from Tsinghua in 1970, He Pengfei was sent to work at a vehicle repair plant in Wudu, Gansu. In 1974, he returned to Beijing to work at the China National Machinery Import and Export Corporation. Xinhua describes him as a deputy section chief there, while Voice of America reports that he soon became a section chief.

== Military career ==
=== General Staff Department ===
After the fall of the Gang of Four and the rehabilitation of his father, He joined the army in October 1977. He was assigned to the equipment department of the General Staff Department of the People's Liberation Army (PLA), where he served as a staff officer and then deputy chief of its comprehensive planning division. He also studied at Tsinghua University and the National University of Defense Technology. He became a deputy head of the equipment department in December 1984 and its head in July 1985. According to Voice of America, many accounts describe him as one of the founders of Poly, which was set up in 1984, and he also served as the company's general manager. Xinhua's obituary credited him with opening up new areas in the modernisation of the PLA's equipment. In September 1988, at the age of 44, he was made a major general, becoming one of the youngest generals in the PLA.

=== Deputy commander of the navy ===
In November 1992, He was transferred to the navy as a deputy commander, with responsibility for its equipment. He was promoted to vice admiral in 1994. After carrying out the navy's equipment programme under the Eighth Five-Year Plan, he organised the drafting of its equipment plans for the Ninth and Tenth Five-Year Plans and a development plan up to 2010. He was also in charge of building up the naval air force, and Xinhua described his work there as pioneering. During the 1990s, he directed the navy's foreign affairs work, including friendly exchanges with other navies, imports of equipment and technology, multilateral military diplomacy and talks on maritime military safety. Throughout his time in the navy, he also chaired its sports committee.

In March 1997, a PLA Navy task group visiting four countries in the Americas made the first call by Chinese warships at the mainland United States, arriving in San Diego after a stop in Hawaii. He Pengfei planned and organised the task group's activities during its visit to the United States. In October 1997, when the US Chief of Naval Operations Admiral Jay L. Johnson visited China, He and the North Sea Fleet commander Zhang Dingfa accompanied him to sea aboard the destroyer Harbin to watch a Chinese naval demonstration. He was a deputy to the 7th National People's Congress and a delegate to the 15th National Congress of the Chinese Communist Party.

=== Purchase of the Varyag ===
In April 1996, He Pengfei began approaching the Hong Kong businessman Xu Zengping about acquiring the unfinished Soviet carrier Varyag, which was lying at a shipyard in Ukraine, and after several rounds of talks, Xu agreed in March 1997 to take on the task. Xu said that he met He about ten times between April 1996 and February 1998, and he recalled He telling him, "For the country and for the army, I am asking you, you must buy it back." According to Xu, He Pengfei and General Ji Shengde were the driving forces behind the covert deal, and they supported it against the wishes of the central government. The businessman Shao Chun told Voice of America that He's endorsement served in effect as an official approval of the purchase, quoting him as saying that the ship could be used and that the navy wanted it. He Pengfei died before the ship was towed to China. It later entered service as the Liaoning.

== Death ==
He died of a sudden heart attack in Beijing on 28 March 2001, at the age of 56. Xinhua reported that leaders including Jiang Zemin, Hu Jintao, Zhang Wannian, Chi Haotian and Liu Huaqing expressed their grief at his death.
