= Zhou Yiqun =

Chinese communist revolutionary

Zhou Yiqun (Chinese: 周逸群) (June 25, 1896 – May 20, 1931) courtesy name Lifeng (Chinese: 立风), was a member of the Chinese Workers' and Peasants' Red Army. He was born in Tongren, Guizhou Province. In 1919, after completing his early education in Guiyang, he went to Japan as an exchange student. He returned to China in 1924. In Shanghai he became an associate of Yun Daiying. In October of that year, he enrolled in the Whampoa Military Academy and joined the Chinese Communist Party in November. After the start of the Northern Expedition, he went to Changde as a member of the 9th Army, 1st Division of the National Revolutionary Army, commanded by He Long. On August 1, 1927, he participated in the Nanchang Uprising under He's command. After the uprising's defeat, he went to Chaozhou. In May 1928, Zhou and his commander He went to Honghu to set up the revolutionary base area at the border of Hunan and Hubei Provinces. In 1930, Zhou was made a political commissar. He was killed in an ambush in Huarong County.
