= Xia Xi =

Early leader of the Chinese Communist Party (1901–1936)

- 夏曦
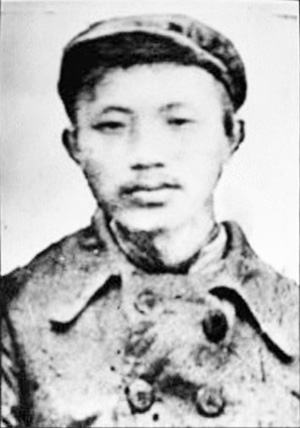

Alternate Member of the Central Committee of the Chinese Communist Party
- In office January 1931 – February 1936

Personal details
- Born: 17 August 1901 Yiyang, Hunan, China
- Died: 28 February 1936 (aged 34) near Bijie, Guizhou, China
- Party: Chinese Communist Party
- Education: Hunan First Normal University; Moscow (Note: Sources differ on where Xia studied in Moscow: the 1983 biography by Liu Qingbo and Lei Zi and several party-history accounts place him at the Communist University of the Toilers of the East, while others name Moscow Sun Yat-sen University.)
- Nickname(s): Man Bo, Lao Xia

Military service
- Years of service: 1927–1936
- Commands: Political commissar, Red Second Army Corps (later Red Third Army), 1931–1934
- Battles/wars: Nanchang Uprising, Encirclement Campaigns, Long March

Chinese name
- Simplified Chinese: 夏曦
- Traditional Chinese: 夏曦
Transcriptions
Standard Mandarin
- Hanyu Pinyin: Xià Xī

Xia Xi (Chinese: 夏曦; 17 August 1901 – 28 February 1936), also known by the courtesy name Man Bo (蔓伯) and the alias Lao Xia (劳侠), was an early leader of the Chinese Communist Party (CCP). One of the party's first members, he served as secretary of its Hunan provincial committee in 1927 and was later counted among the 28 Bolsheviks. From 1931 to 1934 he headed the CCP's Central Sub-bureau for the Hunan–Western Hubei Soviet, where he directed four successive internal purges that killed large numbers of Red Army commanders and party cadres and contributed to the collapse of the base area. He acknowledged the purges as an error from 1934 onwards and was serving as director of the political department of the Sixth Army Group when he drowned in Guizhou in February 1936.

== Early life and political activity in Hunan ==
Xia was born on 17 August 1901 in Yiyang, Hunan. He attended Longzhou Higher Primary School in Yiyang and in August 1917 enrolled at Hunan First Normal University, where he met Mao Zedong. During the May Fourth Movement he took part in the boycott of Japanese goods and in the campaign to expel the warlord governor Zhang Jingyao, and in the second half of 1919 he joined the New People's Study Society founded by Mao and Cai Hesen. He joined the Socialist Youth League in October 1920 and the Chinese Communist Party in 1921, making him one of its earliest members.

Through the early 1920s Xia was prominent in the anti-imperialist and anti-warlord movements in Changsha, writing for the weekly Jiuguo and helping to organise the mass demonstrations that followed the killing of two Changsha residents by Japanese sailors in June 1923; he was among those subsequently ordered arrested by the provincial authorities. Under the First United Front he joined the Kuomintang (KMT) in 1924 and helped organise its Hunan provincial headquarters. At the 2nd National Congress of the Kuomintang in early 1926 he was elected an alternate member of the KMT Central Executive Committee, and during the Northern Expedition he served as secretary of the CCP group within the KMT's Hunan organisation.

At the 5th National Congress of the Chinese Communist Party, held in Wuhan in April and May 1927, Xia was elected to the Central Committee; on his return to Hunan he succeeded Li Weihan as secretary of the provincial committee. He left Changsha the day before the Ma Ri Incident of 21 May 1927 and afterwards attempted, without success, to organise peasant forces in Ningxiang and Yiyang for a counter-attack on the city. On 1 August 1927 he took part in the Nanchang Uprising, after which he travelled to Moscow to study. He attended the [[6th National Congress of the Chinese Communist Party]], held near Moscow in 1928, and became associated with Wang Ming's group, the 28 Bolsheviks.

Xia returned to China in 1930 and served on the standing committee of the Jiangsu provincial committee as head of propaganda. At the Fourth Plenum of the 6th Central Committee in January 1931 he was co-opted onto the Central Committee. (Note: Sources differ on his status: lists of the 6th Central Committee record him as one of four alternate members co-opted at the Fourth Plenum in January 1931, while some party-history accounts describe him as having been added as a full member.)

== Hunan–Western Hubei Soviet and the purges ==
In March 1931 the CCP leadership sent Xia to the Honghu base area in the Hunan–Western Hubei Soviet, replacing Deng Zhongxia. He became secretary of the newly established Central Sub-bureau for the region and concurrently political commissar of the Red Second Army Corps, reorganised that month as the Red Third Army. In his first period there he worked on the campaigns against the Nationalist encirclements, on local government and on the guerrilla forces.

Directives from the Wang Ming leadership in September 1931 and January 1932 instructed base areas to conduct systematic campaigns against alleged counter-revolutionary organisations. From May 1932 Xia led four successive purges in the Hunan–Western Hubei Soviet, each larger than the last, in which suspects were accused of belonging to the "Reorganisationist" faction or the "Third Party" and confessions were extracted under torture. Senior figures killed in the purges included Duan Dechang, executed on 1 May 1933 at Jinguoping in Badong County; Wan Tao, political commissar of the Red Third Army; Liu Zhixun, director of the army's political department; Sun Deqing; Duan Yulin; Song Panming; Wang Bingnan; and Dong Lang. Party and Youth League organisations within the army were dissolved in March 1933, political departments abolished and the wounded discharged. The Red Third Army, which had grown to some 20,000 men, was reduced to about 4,000 by the time it linked up with the Sixth Army Group in late 1934, and the base area was progressively lost.

He Long, who commanded the army, objected repeatedly but was overruled; in his own recollection the two men came close to armed confrontation before Guan Xiangying mediated. Later party assessments held that while Xia bore the principal responsibility for carrying out the purges, they originated in the directives of the Wang Ming leadership, and that others, including Guan Xiangying as the Central Committee's representative, shared in that responsibility.

== Correction of errors and Long March ==
A meeting of the Central Sub-bureau at Fengxiangxi, Yanhe County, on 19 June 1934 made a first assessment of the purges, restored party organisations and political departments in the army, and decided to build a base area in eastern Guizhou; it is generally treated as the turning point at which Xia began to correct his errors. After receiving a Central Committee letter criticising the purges, Xia chaired a further meeting on 4 August 1934 that acknowledged the error and cancelled a planned fifth campaign.

On 24 October 1934 the Red Third Army joined the Sixth Army Group under Ren Bishi, Xiao Ke and Wang Zhen at Muhuang, and resumed the designation Red Second Army Corps. At a joint meeting at Yongshun in early November Xia was criticised and removed from all his leadership posts. A Central Committee telegram of 31 March 1935 held that the organisational conclusion had been inappropriate and that he should continue to work in a leading body while correcting his errors in practice; he was subsequently appointed a member of the Hunan–Hubei–Sichuan–Guizhou provincial committee and of its military commission, vice-chairman of the revolutionary committee, and director of the political department of the Sixth Army Group.

Xia left with the Second and Sixth Army Groups on the Long March on 19 November 1935. He drafted the units' anti-Japanese proclamations and directed their propaganda and united front work; at Bijie in Guizhou in February 1936 he and Wang Zhen recruited the local elder statesman Zhou Suyuan, a former Tongmenghui member, to command a locally raised Guizhou Anti-Japanese National Salvation Army of about a thousand men.

== Death ==
Xia died on 28 February 1936, aged 34, as the Second and Sixth Army Groups withdrew from Bijie. Accounts of the circumstances differ.

According to a 1983 biographical study by Liu Qingbo and Lei Zi, Xia had sent an officer of the political department to the first detachment of the Anti-Japanese National Salvation Army, a force under Xi Daming (席大明), to persuade it to leave with the Red Army, and waited for his return near the Qixingguan crossing outside Bijie. Hearing gunfire from the far bank, Xia forded the river with a bodyguard and two soldiers to find out what had happened; exhausted, he was caught by a surge of current in midstream and drowned together with his bodyguard. Their bodies were recovered downstream, and a memorial meeting was held the following morning by Wang Zhen and Xiao Ke before Xia was buried on a hillside near the Guizhou–Yunnan border. Related versions hold that Xia's party was ambushed by Xi Daming's men and drowned while withdrawing across the river, or that Xia, who could not swim, was being carried across on a bodyguard's back when the bodyguard lost his footing.

A different account, of doubtful authenticity and preserved only in apocryphal writing from the mid-2000s, holds that Red Army soldiers on the bank saw Xia fall into the water but made no attempt to rescue him because of resentment at the purges he had directed. It appeared in a 2006 article by He Libo and was repeated in later writing on Xia. Writers who reject this version note that accounts drawn from participants describe the drowning as accidental. Historical scholarship has established that this claim is clearly inaccurate. It was soldiers of the Second Red Army Corps who were dissatisfied with Xia, and by the time Xia was unfortunately drowned to death, he had already been transferred to the Sixth Red Army Corps.

Xia is described in Chinese accounts as the most senior Red Army leader to die during the Long March.

== Assessment and commemoration ==
Mao Zedong, a fellow student of Xia's at Hunan First Normal, wrote to Xia's father after his death that what Man Bo had left unfinished was also his own responsibility. In his concluding remarks to the Sixth Plenum of the 6th Central Committee in November 1938, Mao held that Xia had been fundamentally committed to the revolution but had made serious errors, and that some of his actions in the Hunan–Western Hubei Soviet had been wrong. Xiao Ke summarised him as having been "good at both ends and wrong in the middle".

Xia was treated officially as a revolutionary martyr. A monument was erected at the site of his death, and in 1985 the Central Committee and State Council approved the transfer of his remains to the Bijie Martyrs' Cemetery, where a tomb bearing an inscription in Xiao Ke's calligraphy was completed in April 1986.
