= He Long =

Marshal of the People's Republic of China (1896–1969)

Yuanshuai He Long
- 贺龙
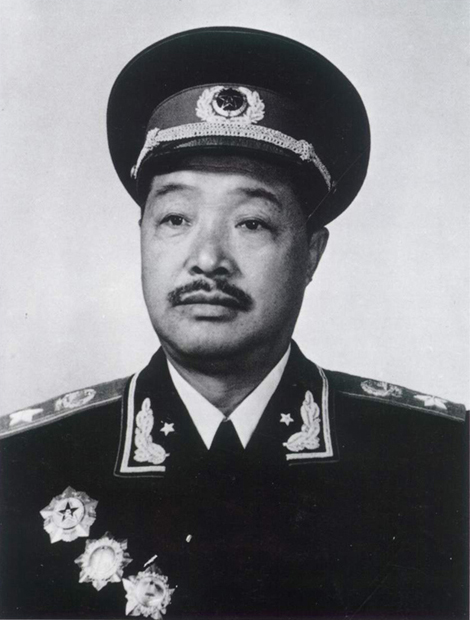
- Marshal He Long in 1955

Member of Central Committee of the Chinese Communist Party
- In office October 1954 – 9 June 1969
- Chairman: Mao Zedong

Vice Premier of China
- In office October 1954 – 9 June 1969
- Premier: Zhou Enlai

Personal details
- Born: 賀龍; March 22, 1896 Sangzhi, Hunan, Qing Empire
- Died: June 9, 1969 (aged 73) Beijing, China
- Party: Chinese Communist Party (1926–1969)
- Occupation: General, politician, writer
- Nickname(s): 贺老总 (Hè lǎozǒng, "Old Chief He") 贺胡子 (Hè húzi, "mustachio He")

Military service
- Allegiance: China
- Branch/service: People's Liberation Army Ground Force
- Years of service: Republic of China (1914–1920); National Revolutionary Army (1920–1927); Chinese Communist Party (1927–1969)
- Rank: Marshal of People's Republic of China
- Commands: Division Commander of the Eighth Route Army; Vice Chairman of the Central Military Commission
- Battles/wars: Northern Expedition; Chinese Civil War; Long March; First encirclement campaign against the Honghu Soviet; Third encirclement campaign against the Honghu Soviet; Sino-Japanese War; Hundred Regiments Offensive
- Awards: Order of August the First (1st Class Medal) (1955); Order of Independence and Freedom (1st Class Medal) (1955); Order of Liberation (China) (1st Class Medal) (1955)

He Long (simplified Chinese: 贺龙; traditional Chinese: 賀龍; pinyin: Hè Lóng; March 22, 1896 – June 9, 1969) was a Chinese revolutionary and a Marshal of the People's Republic of China. He was from a poor rural family in Hunan, and his family was not able to provide him with any formal education. He began his revolutionary career after avenging the death of his uncle, when he fled to become an outlaw and attracted a small personal army around him. Later, his forces joined the Kuomintang, and he participated in the Northern Expedition.

He rebelled against the Kuomintang after Chiang Kai-shek began violently suppressing Communists, when he planned and led the unsuccessful Nanchang Uprising. After escaping, he organized a soviet in rural Hunan (and later Guizhou), but was forced to abandon his bases when pressured by Chiang's Encirclement Campaigns. He joined the Long March in 1935, over a year after forces associated with Mao Zedong and Zhu De were forced to do so. He met with forces led by Zhang Guotao, but he disagreed with Zhang about the strategy of the Red Army and led his forces to join and support Mao.

After settling and establishing a headquarters in Shaanxi, He led guerrilla forces in Northwest China in both the Chinese Civil War and the Second Sino-Japanese War, and was generally successful in expanding areas of Communist control. He commanded a force of 170,000 troops forces by the end of 1945, when his force was placed under the command of Peng Dehuai and He became Peng's second-in-command. He was placed in control of Southwest China in the late 1940s, and spent most of the 1950s in the Southwest administering the region in both civilian and military roles.

He held a number of civilian and military positions after the founding of the People's Republic of China in 1949. In 1955, his contributions to the victory of the Chinese Communist Party were recognized when he was named one of the Ten Marshals, and he served as China's vice premier. He did not support Mao Zedong's attempts to purge Peng Dehuai in 1959 and attempted to rehabilitate Peng. After the Cultural Revolution was declared in 1966, he was one of the first leaders of the PLA to be purged. He died in 1969 when a glucose injection provided by his jailers complicated his untreated diabetes.

== Early life ==
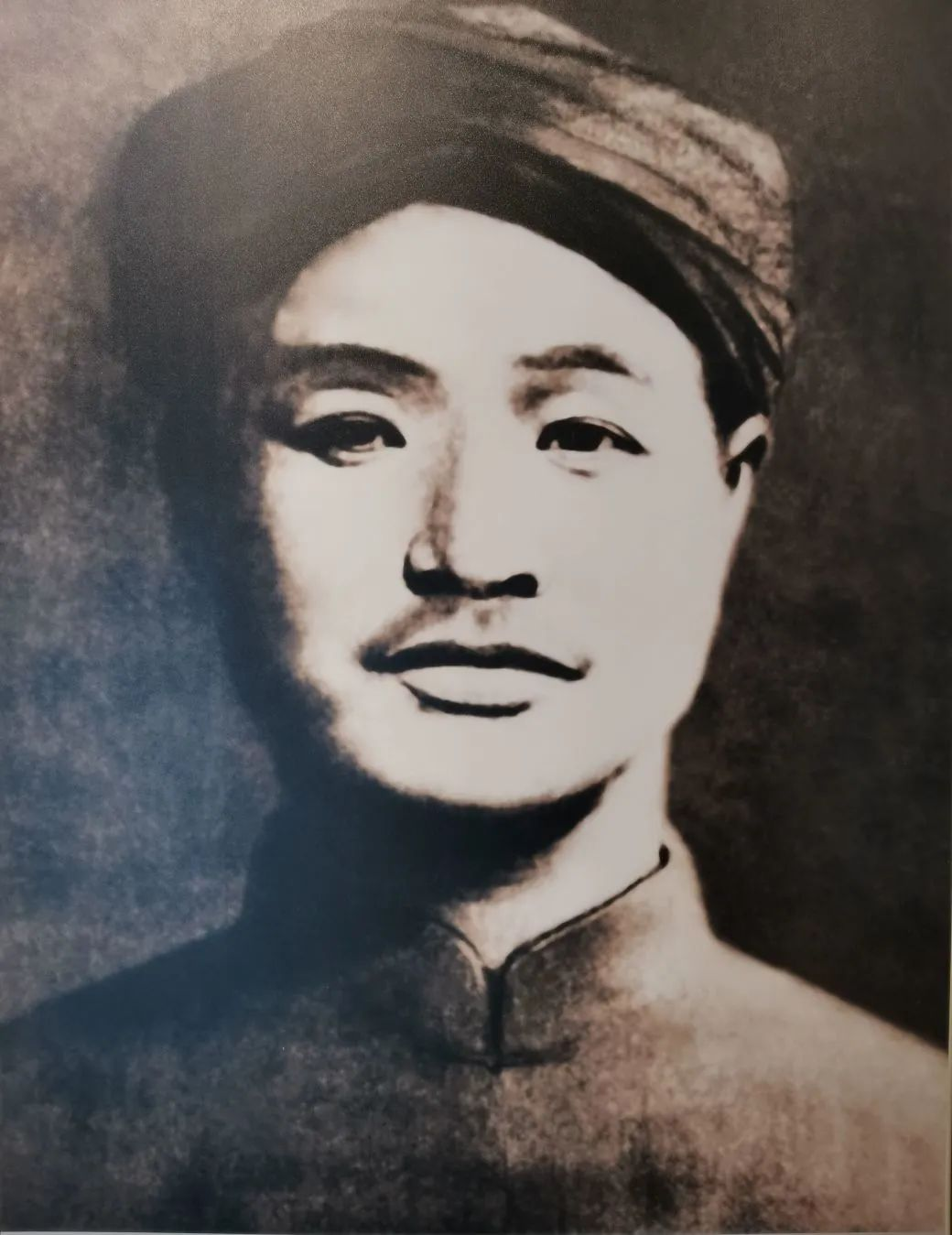
He Long in his youth

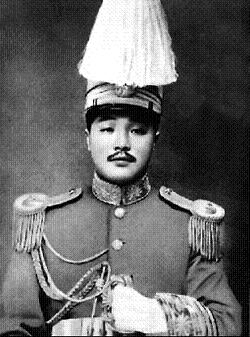
He in 1925.

He Long was a member of the Tujia ethnic group. He was born on March 22, 1896, in Hongjiaguan, Sangzhi County, Hunan, with the birth name He Wenchang and the courtesy name Yunqing. According to his official biography, the He family was registered locally as a Han "military household", descended from a soldier who had settled in Sangzhi after Qing forces were sent to suppress a local uprising in 1653. His mother, Wang Jingu, was a Tujia woman from Hefeng, and he was the fourth of seven children. He and his siblings, including He Ying, grew up in a poor peasant household, despite his father being a minor Qing military officer. His father was a member of the Gelaohui (Elder Brother Society), a secret society dating back to the early Qing dynasty. A cowherd during his youth, he received no formal education. His official biography states that he attended a village private school for a time from the age of five, but left because of his family's poverty, after which he learned tailoring from his father and worked as a salt carrier.

In 1914, he joined Sun Yat-sen's Chinese Revolutionary Party. When He was 20, he killed a local government tax assessor who had killed his uncle for defaulting on his taxes. In March 1916, he and 21 neighbours destroyed the salt tax office at Bamaoxi and seized 12 guns, and he then organized an anti-Yuan Shikai militia in Sangzhi and served as its commander. After the movement failed, he went to Changsha and changed his name to He Long. He then fled and became an outlaw, giving rise to the legend that he began his revolutionary career with just two kitchen knives. Official accounts date the "two kitchen knives" incident to December 1917, when, after being disarmed by his superiors, he and Wu Yulin attacked the guards of the Cili county magistrate at Liangshuijing with kitchen knives and seized two guns to rebuild his force. After beginning his life as an outlaw, he gained a reputation as a "Robin Hood-like figure". His signature weapon was a butcher knife.

Around 1918, He raised a volunteer revolutionary army that was aligned with a local Hunan warlord, and in 1920, his personal army joined the National Revolutionary Army. In 1922, he entered Sichuan with an army sent by Sun Yat-sen and commanded a brigade defending the Yangtze. In September 1923, as commander of the 1st Mixed Brigade of Sun's Anti-Warlord Army in Sichuan, he led the seizure at Fuling of the Japanese steamer Yiyang Maru, which was carrying arms for the warlord Wu Peifu. When the Anti-Warlord Army collapsed that winter, he began to doubt Sun's reliance on warlord armies. In April 1925, He was appointed garrison commander of Lizhou, where he organized drought relief, suppressed banditry and opened schools. After the May Thirtieth Movement, he sent telegrams supporting protesting students and workers and donated 3,000 silver dollars. In October 1925, the Hunan governor Zhao Hengti attacked him, and he withdrew to Guizhou. In 1925, He ran a school for training Kuomintang soldiers. While running this school, He became close with some of his students who were also Chinese Communist Party (CCP) members.

== Military career ==
=== Northern Expedition and Nanchang Uprising ===
During the 1926 Northern Expedition, He commanded the 1st Division, 9th Corps of the National Revolutionary Army. He served under Zhang Fakui during the Northern Expedition. In August 1926, he invited a propaganda team led by the Communist Zhou Yiqun to work in his division, and in September he made Zhou head of the division's political department. His troops captured Yichang in December 1926, and the division was reorganized as the Independent 15th Division. In 1927, he fought in Henan during the second Northern Expedition launched by the Wuhan government, and on June 15 his division was expanded into the 20th Army, with He as its commander.

In late 1926, He joined the CCP. According to the Communist Party Members Website, he only joined the Party at the end of August or the beginning of September 1927, after allegedly sending up to 70 requests. The official chronology of his life states that he was admitted at Ruijin during the southward march after the Nanchang Uprising, sponsored by Zhou Yiqun and Tan Pingshan. In 1927, after the collapse of Wang Jingwei's leftist Kuomintang government in Wuhan and Chiang Kai-shek's suppression of communists, He left the Kuomintang and joined the Communists, commanding the 20th Corps, 1st Column of the Red Army. He first met Zhou Enlai in Wuhan in early July 1927, and when Wang Jingwei's government began arresting Communists in Wuhan on July 15, he posted guards to protect more than 300 of them. On July 23, at Jiujiang, Tan Pingshan told him of the party's plan for an armed uprising in Nanchang, and he agreed to take part.

He and Zhu De led the main force of the Nanchang Uprising in 1927. On July 28, the CCP Front Committee appointed He commander-in-chief of the uprising forces. Their force quickly captured Nanchang and attempted to move on to Guangdong. He's troops were intercepted and defeated by Nationalist forces near Shantou and the uprising disintegrated. The campaign suffered from logistical difficulties, and the Communists suffered 50% casualties in the two months of fighting. Most of He's soldiers who survived surrendered, deserted, and/or rejoined the KMT. Only 2,000 survivors eventually returned to fight for the Communists in 1928, when Zhu reformed his forces in Hunan.

After his forces were defeated, He fled to Lufeng, Guangdong. He spent some time in Hong Kong, but was later sent by the CCP to Shanghai, then to Wuhan. According to the official chronology, the party planned to send him to study in the Soviet Union, but the plan was dropped after he was discovered by Nationalist agents and placed on a wanted list. Chiang Kai-shek continuously tried to persuade him rejoin the Kuomintang, but failed.

=== Communist guerrilla ===
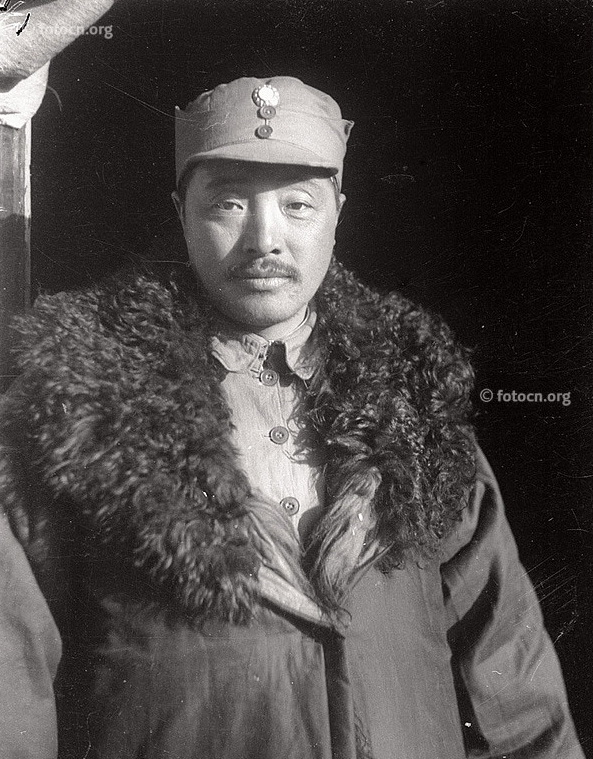
He Long in the National Revolutionary Army (1939)

After the failure of the Nanchang Uprising, He turned down an offer by the CCP Central Committee to study in Russia and returned to Hunan, where he raised a new force in 1930. His force controlled a broad area of the countryside in the Hunan-Hubei border region, around the area of Lake Hong, and organized this area into a rural soviet. Kuomintang forces targeted He's Soviet as part of the Fourth Encirclement Campaign. He's forces abandoned their bases, moved southwest, and established a new base in Northeast Guizhou.

In January 1928, the CCP leadership approved He's request to return to western Hunan, where he and Zhou Yiqun joined a new party special committee. He raised about 3,000 men in Sangzhi, but most were scattered by Nationalist attacks in April, and by September 1928 his Red 4th Army had been reduced to 91 men with 72 rifles. In January 1929, he captured Hefeng and set up a soviet government there, the first base of what became the Hunan–Hubei border soviet. On July 4, 1930, his Red 4th Army joined Zhou Yiqun's Red 6th Army at Gong'an to form the Red 2nd Army Group, with He as its commander-in-chief. The army group was reorganized as the Red 3rd Army in 1931. Under the leftist leadership of Xia Xi, the army carried out large-scale purges in which many of its cadres were killed, and He objected to the purges and to Xia's reorganization of the army. After the Fourth Encirclement Campaign, the army withdrew from the Honghu soviet in late 1932. In December 1933, Chiang Kai-shek sent Xiong Gongqing to persuade He to defect, but He reported the approach to his party superiors, and Xiong was executed in January 1934. In May 1934, He led the Red 3rd Army into eastern Guizhou, where it established a base around Yanhe, Dejiang, Yinjiang and Songtao.

In 1934, Ren Bishi joined He in Guizhou with his own surviving forces after also being forced to abandon his Soviet in another Encirclement Campaign. Ren and He merged forces, with He becoming the military commander and Ren becoming the commissar. The two forces met in October 1934, and in November, He became commander of the military region of the new Hunan–Hubei–Sichuan–Guizhou base. In 1935, his forces defeated a series of Nationalist offensives against the base, destroying a brigade at Chenjiahe in April, capturing the division commander Zhang Zhenhan near Zhongbao in June, and killing the division commander Xie Bin at Banliyuan in August. He joined the Long March in November 1935, over a year after forces led by Zhu De and Mao Zedong were forced to evacuate their own Soviet in Jiangxi. His forces set out from Liujiaping in Sangzhi County. He's ability to resist the Kuomintang was partially due to his position on the periphery of Communist-controlled territory. While on the Long March, He's forces met Communist forces led by Zhang Guotao in mid-1936, but both He and Ren disagreed with Zhang about the direction of the Long March, and He eventually led his forces into Shaanxi to join Mao Zedong by the end of 1936. During this period, he repeatedly thwarted Chiang's plans to annihilate his army. The two armies met at Ganzi on July 1, 1936, and when Zhang circulated pamphlets attacking the party leadership, He ordered his units to collect them. On July 5, his forces and the Red 32nd Army were combined into the Second Front Army, with He as commander-in-chief. While crossing the grasslands, he killed his own horse to feed his troops. On October 21, 1936, the Second Front Army met the First Front Army at Jiangtaipu in Huining County, completing the Long March. In 1937, He settled his troops in Northwestern Shaanxi and established a new headquarters there. Because the Second Army of the Chinese Red Army under He Long's command was one of the few Communist forces to arrive in Yan'an mostly intact, his force was able to assume the responsibility of protecting the new capital after their arrival.

=== Second Sino-Japanese War ===
When the Red Army was reorganized into the Eighth Route Army in 1937, He was placed in command of the 120th Division. He Long was also assigned the official rank of Lieutenant General by the National Revolutionary Army. At the Luochuan Conference in August 1937, He was elected a member of the party's Central Military Commission. The 120th Division crossed the Yellow River into northwestern Shanxi in September 1937, and in October it attacked Japanese communication lines around Yanmen Pass. Between March 4 and April 1, 1938, it recovered seven county towns in northwestern Shanxi from Japanese forces. In the same year, He sent a detachment into Suiyuan to establish a guerrilla base in the Daqing Mountains. From late 1938 to 1940, He fought both the Japanese army and Kuomintang-affiliated guerrillas in Hebei. He led the main force of the 120th Division to central Hebei in December 1938, and he was poisoned during the battle of Qihui in April 1939. In September 1939, his forces destroyed a Japanese battalion in the battle of Chenzhuang.

After Yan Xishan's attack on Communist-led forces in December 1939, He returned to northwestern Shanxi in January 1940. His forces took part in the Hundred Regiments Offensive in August and September 1940, and in November he became commander of the Northwest Shanxi Military Region. In May 1942, he became commander of the Shaanxi–Gansu–Ningxia and Shanxi–Suiyuan Joint Defense Army, and in June he became deputy director of the Northwest Finance and Economic Committee. During the Nationalist and Japanese blockade of the Shaan-Gan-Ning Border Region, he promoted the slogan "a gun in one hand and a hoe in the other" and sent the 359th Brigade to farm at Nanniwan, which made the troops largely self-sufficient. He's responsibilities increased during the Second Sino-Japanese War, and in 1943, he was promoted to be the overall commander of Communist forces in Shanxi, Shaanxi, Gansu, Ningxia, and Inner Mongolia. By the end of World War II, He commanded a force of approximately 175,000 troops across Northwestern China. His most notable subordinates included Zhang Zongxun, Xu Guangda, and Peng Shaohui.

He was successful in expanding Communist base areas throughout the period of World War II. Part of He's success was due to the social confusion caused by Japan's Ichi-Go Offensive in the areas of China that Japanese operations effected. He was frequently able to expand Communist areas of operation by allying with local, independent guerrilla forces who were also fighting the Japanese. He's experience fighting the Kuomintang and the Japanese led him to question Mao's unconditional emphasis on the importance of ideological guerrilla warfare at the expense of conventional tactics and military organization.

=== Second-half of the Chinese Civil War ===
In October 1945, one month after the Japanese surrender, the command of He's forces was transferred to Peng Dehuai, which operated as the "Northwest Field Army". He became Peng's second-in-command, but spent most of the rest of the Chinese Civil War in central CCP headquarters, in and around Yan'an. In 1945, He was elected to the CCP Central Committee, and his influence rose within both the military and the Communist political system. He then became a leading figure in mobilizing cadres to work in other regions throughout China when the Civil War resumed. In the autumn of 1945, he led the Shanxi–Suiyuan Field Army in the Suiyuan campaign against Fu Zuoyi with Nie Rongzhen, and in July and August 1946, his forces killed more than 8,600 Nationalist troops in the North Shanxi campaign. At the Xiaohe meeting in July 1947, Mao placed He in charge of both the Shaan-Gan-Ning and Shanxi–Suiyuan liberated areas, with responsibility for supplying the Northwest war effort. Near the end of the Chinese Civil War, He was made Director of the Xi'an Military Control Commission, and promoted to command the First Field Army, which was active in Southwest China. He became director of the Xi'an commission on May 24, 1949, and in December he led the 18th Army Group from Shaanxi into Sichuan, taking Chengdu on December 29. As part of the Southwest Bureau's leadership, he was one of the leaders behind the Chengdu Campaign, Battle of Xichang and the Battle of Chamdo. His "slow first, fast later" approach facilitated conditions for a decisive Communist victory in Chengdu. After the Communists won the Civil War in 1949, He spent most of the 1950s in both civilian and military roles in the Southwest, most notably as Vice Chairman of the Southwest Military and Political Committee. In this position, he made crucial appointments that shaped the military and political landscape of several provinces, including in bandit suppression efforts. In January 1950, he submitted a report to Mao on conditions for an advance into Tibet, and in February he became third secretary of the party's Southwest Bureau and commander of the Southwest Military Region. In July 1950, he set up a command that deployed 30,000 troops and 100,000 labourers to build the Chengdu–Chongqing railway.

== People's Republic of China ==
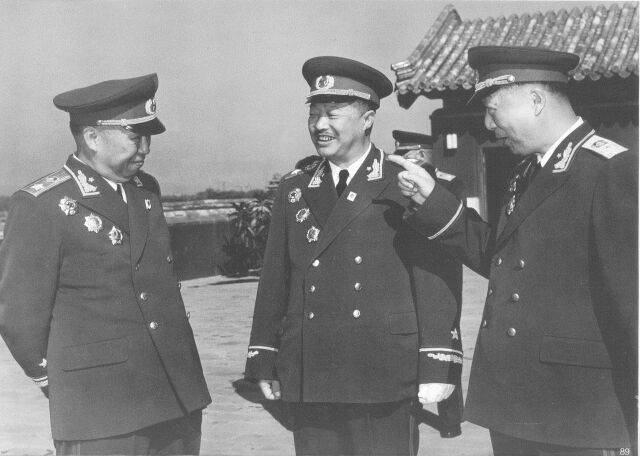
He Long (center) with Marshals Nie Rongzhen (left) and Luo Ronghuan at Tiananmen (1959)

He's military accomplishments were recognized when he was promoted to being one of the Ten Marshals in 1955, and he served in a number of civilian positions. He was also made Vice Premier, concurrently heading the National Sports Commission, and in that role facilitated sports exchanges with the Soviet Union and the Eastern European countries. He was appointed director of the Central Sports Committee on November 15, 1952, and in September 1954, the first National People's Congress appointed him vice premier, director of the State Sports Commission and vice chairman of the National Defence Council. He was awarded the rank of marshal and the first-class Orders of August First, Independence and Freedom, and Liberation in September 1955, and he was elected to the Politburo in September 1956. He Long had had prior experience in organizing sports competitions since the Red Army period, and in 1951, established the earliest professional sports team established nationwide after the Civil War, facing pressure in appointing instructors and coaches who had worked under the Kuomintang. He was one of the most well-traveled members of the CCP elite, and led numerous delegations abroad, meeting with leaders of other Asian countries, the Soviet Union, and East Germany. He led a government delegation to Poland in 1955, and in November 1956, he accompanied Zhou Enlai on a visit to 11 countries in Europe and Asia.

Having led troops for a long time and understanding the sense of inferiority among Chinese athletes on the world stage, He Long placed great emphasis on ensuring that sports teams excelled in three areas: ideology, technique, and conduct. Therefore, in the training of athletes, He Long advocated that the difficulty level of training should significantly exceed that of the competition, so that athletes could maximize their technical abilities and compete with the world's best. In developing professional sports, he not only handled major events but also meticulous details. He would watch tennis players at the training facility and then tell the coaches to identify their weaknesses by applying statistical methods. Facing a shortage of sports venues and technical personnel, he embarked on constructing new ones, launching campaigns and creating principles for development, inducing overseas talents to return, and establishing newspapers and magazines to focus on reporting sporting events. He implemented radio calisthenics, resulting in a general improvement in students' physical fitness, and took the lead in the popularization of sports in rural areas. He presided over the first national sports work conference in April 1953, commanded the headquarters for the Chinese expedition to Mount Everest from 1958, and chaired the preparatory committee for the first National Games. In October 1964, he circulated a speech on table tennis by the player Xu Yinsheng to all national teams and sent it to Mao, who praised it in January 1965.

On 5 January 1960, the CCP Central Committee approved the establishment of the National Defense Industry Commission, appointing He Long as its director. Because the defense industry was full of top national secrets, He Long, upon assuming office, stipulated a strict secrecy rule for all staff members: anything involving defense industry secrets, whether from the perspective of the unit or individual, including himself, was strictly forbidden from being publicized in newspapers. Therefore, He Long's period of leadership in the defense industry has remained largely unknown. Upon assuming this post, he began to rectify the quality control of China's armaments production. He had been appointed a vice chairman of the Central Military Commission (CMC) on September 26, 1959, and in January 1960 he called for an independent modern defence industry that gave priority to nuclear weapons, missiles and jet aircraft. During the Third Front construction movement, He Long, as a member of the Politburo, Vice Chairman of the Central Military Commission and Vice Premier, went on inspection tours to China’s interior. In late 1963, at Mao's proposal, He took charge of the CMC's day-to-day work, and in 1964 he promoted army-wide training competitions and the "Guo Xingfu teaching method". He stopped presiding over the CMC's daily work after a Politburo meeting in Shanghai in December 1965.

After Mao Zedong purged Peng Dehuai in 1959, Mao appointed He to the head of an office to investigate Peng's past and find reasons to criticize Peng. He accepted the position but was sympathetic to Peng, and stalled for over a year before submitting his report. Mao's prestige weakened when it became widely known that Mao's Great Leap Forward had been a disaster, and He eventually presented a report that was positive, and which attempted to vindicate Peng. Peng was partially rehabilitated in 1965, but then purged again at the beginning of the Cultural Revolution in 1966. The Soviets were unhappy with China's direction, and in a meeting, Marshal Rodion Malinovsky, the Soviet Defense Minister, had reportedly suggested to Marshal He Long that China remove Mao from leadership. The exchange took place in November 1964, when He was deputy leader of Zhou Enlai's delegation to Moscow, and the official chronology states that He rebutted Malinovsky's remarks.

=== Fall and death ===
As the Cultural Revolution began, Jiang Qing denounced He in December 1966 of being a "rightist" and of intra-CCP factionalism. Following Jiang's accusations He and his supporters were branded an anti-CCP element and quickly purged. He Long, then the leading figure among active members of the Central Military Commission, was accused of fomenting a "February Mutiny", which supposedly took place in 1966, with other military and political leaders in China. It was also believed that he had been opposing Lin Biao's military appointments. In August 1966, He had questioned the attacks on senior cadres. On September 5, Mao showed him a letter of accusations that Lin Biao had instructed Wu Faxian to write, told him not to worry, and reaffirmed his loyalty to the party and the people. On November 13, 1966, he told students and teachers from military academies not to interfere in local Cultural Revolution activities or join street demonstrations. His opponents described him as the "biggest bandit". He was the second highest-ranking member of the Central Military Commission at the time when he was purged, and the method in which he and those close to him were purged set the pattern for multiple later purges of the PLA leadership throughout the Cultural Revolution. The Sports Commission was not spared, with several leading athletes and personnel being mentally and physically abused before and after his purge. In June 1968, He Long was denounced as the fourth-highest ranking counter-revolution revisionist.

After being purged, He was placed under indefinite house arrest for the last two and a half years of his life. He described the conditions of his imprisonment as a period of slow torture, in which his captors "intended to destroy my health so that they can murder me without spilling my blood". During the years that he was imprisoned, his captors restricted his access to water, cut off his house's heat during the winter, and refused him access to medicine to treat his diabetes from January 1969. He was moved to the Western Hills outside Beijing on January 20, 1967, and was formally placed under investigation that September. From June 1968, he was held in custody by a central special case office, and in September 1968, he dictated to his wife, Xue Ming, a written rebuttal of the charges against him. He Long had suffered from diabetes mellitus for many years. Poor medical treatment manifested his conditions into diabetic acidosis soon after. According to the official chronology, from April 1969, his medication was reduced, changed or withheld on the instructions of the special case team. On 8 June 1969, after he developed symptoms of acidosis, doctors gave him a hypertonic glucose injection that worsened his condition. He was admitted to hospital, after a glucose injection complicated his chronic diabetes. He was taken to the 301 Hospital on the morning of June 9, and he died there at 3:04 pm. He died in 1969 while severely malnourished.

=== Rehabilitation ===
He was posthumously partially rehabilitated by Mao in 1974. In February 1973, Mao said that He Long had no problems and instructed that his reputation be restored. On 21 December 1973, at an enlarged meeting of the CMC Standing Committee, Mao said that He Long had been wronged, that he had made a mistake by trusting Lin Biao's one-sided account, and that he would take responsibility. On September 29, 1974, the Central Committee issued a document restoring He's reputation, which the official chronology describes as "not thorough". In 1975, He was buried in Babaoshan Revolutionary Cemetary. At the ceremony for the placement of his ashes on 9 June 1975, Zhou Enlai, who was ill, spoke and praised his decades of service.

He was fully rehabilitated after Deng Xiaoping came to power in the late 1970s. On 16 October 1982, the Central Committee issued a "Decision on Thoroughly Rehabilitating Comrade He Long", which called the accusations against him lies fabricated by Lin Biao, Kang Sheng and others, and revoked the earlier documents on his case.

He's family petitioned for his body to be sent from Babaoshan to Hunan, which occurred in 2009. The Central Committee's 1982 decision described He as an outstanding party member, a proven proletarian revolutionary, a brilliant military strategist and one of the founders of the army.

== Personal life ==
He Long married five times during his lifetime. His first wife, Xu Yuegu, was his child bride from the age of 10, and they later had a daughter, He Jinlian. After Xu died, He Long married Xiang Yuangu in 1920, but she returned to her hometown and died in 1929. His third wife, Hu Qinxian, was an entertainer whom he married while serving in Lizhou. She was later imprisoned and eventually settled in Chengdu.

In 1929, He married Jian Xianren. Their relationship later deteriorated and they separated while in Yan’an. His fifth wife was Xue Ming, whom he married in 1942. She remained with him until his death.

He had one son, He Pengfei, and four daughters: He Jinlian, He Jiesheng, He Xiaoming and He Liming. His children, particularly He Pengfei and He Jiesheng, later pursued careers connected to the military. He Pengfei became a vice admiral and deputy commander of the PLA Navy. In 2012, He Jiesheng denied rumours that she had denounced her father in a big-character poster during the Cultural Revolution, calling the poster circulating online a forgery.

== Awards and honors ==
China:

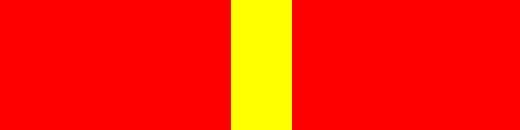
Order of August 1 (1st Class Medal) (1955)
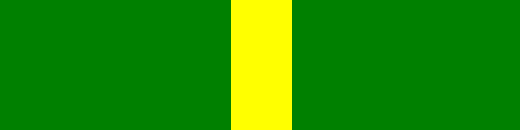
Order of Independence and Freedom (1st Class Medal) (1955)
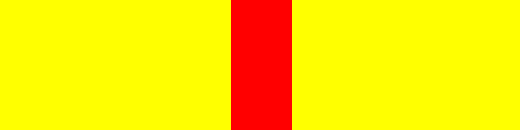
Order of Liberation (1st Class Medal) (1955)

Cambodia:

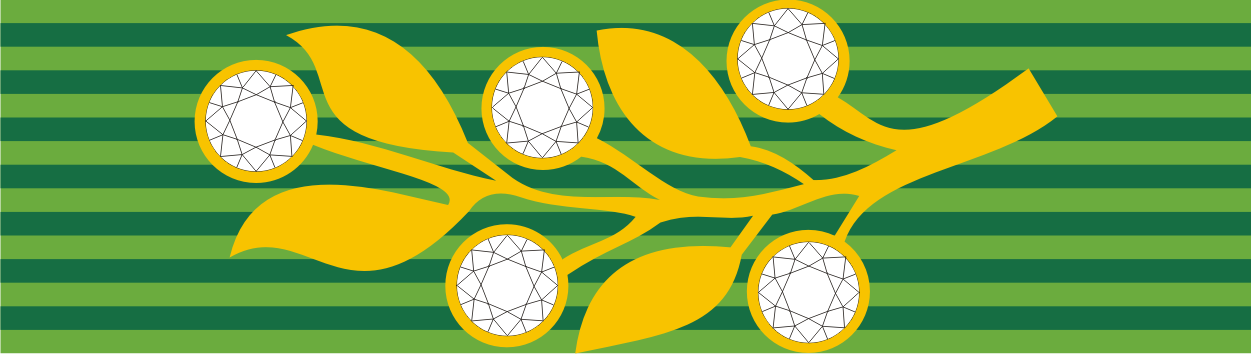
Grand Cross of the Royal Order of Sowathara (1956)

A stadium in Changsha was named after him in 1987. His former residence in Hongjiaguan was listed as a key cultural heritage site by the Hunan Provincial Government in 1983, and on May 25, 2006, the State Council added it to the sixth batch of national key cultural heritage sites. The He Long Memorial Hall, which stands opposite the residence, has eight exhibition halls.

== See also ==
- List of officers of the People's Liberation Army
- Outline of the military history of the People's Republic of China
