= Xu Jishen =

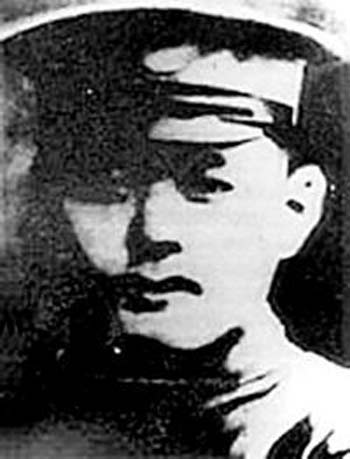

Xu Jishen (Chinese: 许继慎) (March 10, 1901－November 1931) was a member of the Chinese Workers' and Peasants' Red Army. He was born in Lu'an, Anhui Province. In 1919, he participated in the May Fourth Movement. In 1920, he went to Anqing. In April 1921, he joined the Communist Youth League of China. In 1923, Xu left Anhui for Shanghai, enrolling in Shanghai University. In 1924, Xu entered the Whampoa Military Academy and joined the Chinese Communist Party. He quickly rose through the ranks from platoon commander to deputy company commander to company commander, ultimately rising to the rank of major. After the Canton Coup, he was made a battalion commander under Ye Ting. During his participation in the Northern Expedition, he was wounded due to the actions of Xia Douyin.

== Chinese Civil War ==
After the breakdown of the alliance between the communists and the Kuomintang, Xu left the National Revolutionary Army. In March 1930, he went to the Eyuwan Soviet in the border region of Hubei, Henan and Anhui Provinces, where he was made commander of the First Red Army. Under his command, the Red Army inflicted 7,000 casualties on the Kuomintang forces. In December 1930, the Kuomintang launched their first offensive on the area. Xu's forces defeated 3 Kuomintang regiments totalling 3,000 troops. In January 1931, Xu's command was downgraded to divisional with the merging of the Red 1st Army into the Red 4th Army. Xu was able to defeat a Kuomintang brigade and take 2,000 prisoners. A later offensive resulted in the capture of a Kuomintang general (a descendant of Song Dynasty general Yue Fei) and 5,000 soldiers. In April 1931, Chiang Kai-shek ordered another offensive on the area, with He Yingqin in direct command. Ji Hongchang, one of the generals in this campaign, refused to fight the communists and attempted negotiations instead. Using this to frame Xu as collaborator with the Kuomintang, Zhang Guotao ordered his execution, which took place at Guangshan County, Henan.
