= Zhang Guotao =

Chinese politician (1897–1979)

- 张国焘
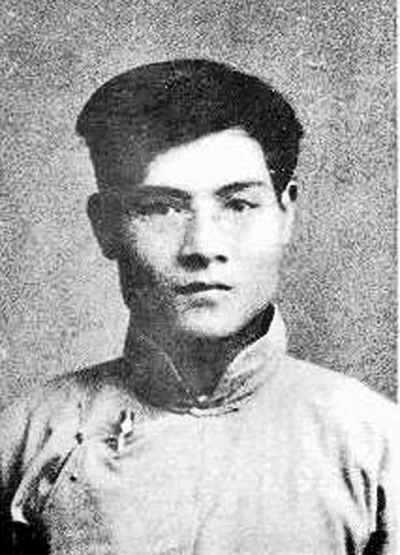
- Zhang in 1927
- Born: November 26, 1897; Pingxiang, Jiangxi, Qing Empire
- Died: December 3, 1979 (aged 82); Scarborough, Ontario, Canada
- Political party: Chinese Communist Party (until 1938)
- Spouse: Yang Zilie

Zhang Guotao
- Traditional Chinese: 張國燾
- Simplified Chinese: 张国焘
Transcriptions
Standard Mandarin
- Hanyu Pinyin: Zhāng Guótāo
- Wade–Giles: Chang Kuo-t'ao

Zhang Guotao (simplified Chinese: 张国焘; traditional Chinese: 張國燾, or Chang Kuo-tao; November 26, 1897 – December 3, 1979) was a Chinese revolutionary who was a founding member of the Chinese Communist Party (CCP) and rival to Mao Zedong. During the 1920s, he studied in the Soviet Union and became a key contact with the Communist International, organizing the CCP labor movement in the First United Front with the Kuomintang. From 1931 to 1932, after the CCP had been driven from the cities, Zhang was placed in charge of the Eyuwan Soviet. When his armies were driven from the region, he joined the Long March but lost a contentious struggle for party leadership to Mao Zedong. Zhang's armies then took a different route from Mao's and were badly beaten by local Muslim Ma clique forces in Gansu. When his depleted forces finally arrived to join Mao in Yan'an, Zhang continued his losing challenge to Mao, and left the party in 1938. Zhang eventually retired to Canada in 1968. He became a Christian shortly before his death in Scarborough, Ontario (a suburb of Toronto), in 1979. His memoirs provide valuable and vivid information on his life and party history.

== Early and student life ==
Zhang was born on 26 November 1897 in Pingxiang County, Jiangxi. He was involved in revolutionary activities as a youth and was attending Peking University in 1916. He graduated from the university's science college. Zhang was initially drawn to anarchism before turning to Marxism, and he became one of the most prominent student leaders of the May Fourth Movement, which began with demonstrations on 4 May 1919. In March 1920, he took part with Li Dazhao and others in the university's Marxist Theory Research Society. At the time, Mao Zedong was working at the university library, and the two knew each other.

In October 1920, Li Dazhao, Zhang Shenfu and Zhang Guotao formed the Beijing communist group. In late November, it became the Beijing branch of the CCP, with Li as secretary and Zhang in charge of organization. He also worked with Deng Zhongxia and others to found the Beijing Socialist Youth League, which he later led as secretary. Zhang attended the party's founding congress in Shanghai in July 1921 as a delegate from Beijing. He presided over the congress in place of Chen Duxiu and was elected head of organization in the party's Central Bureau. The post was later regarded as the first head of the party's Organization Department.

== Communist Party career ==
=== Labor organizer ===
Zhang directed the party's early efforts to organize China's small urban working class. In August 1921, Zhang became director of the Chinese Labor Organization Secretariat, which the party set up in Shanghai to direct its work among workers. In January 1922, he attended a congress of Far Eastern revolutionary organizations in Moscow, where he was received by Vladimir Lenin. He addressed the First National Labor Congress in Guangzhou in May 1922, which had 173 delegates representing about 340,000 organized workers in 12 cities. At the Second Congress in July 1922, he was elected to the five-member Central Executive Committee. Zhang was among the main leaders of the Beijing–Hankou railway strike, which began on 4 February 1923 with more than 20,000 workers. After the warlord Wu Peifu crushed the strike on 7 February, Zhang ordered the workers back to work to limit their losses.

=== First United Front ===
At the Third Congress in June 1923, Zhang lost his seat on the Central Executive Committee after Chen Duxiu criticized him for forming a small faction. After the alliance between the Nationalists and the Communists was formed, Zhang became a Nationalist official. At the Kuomintang's First National Congress in January 1924, he was elected an alternate member of its Central Executive Committee, together with fellow Communists such as Mao, Lin Boqu and Qu Qiubai. Zhang was arrested in Beijing in 1924. Accounts published in the People's Republic of China, citing Beijing police archives opened after 1949, state that he wrote a confession under torture that named Li Dazhao first among others, and that this indirectly contributed to Li's execution in 1927.

At the Fourth Congress in January 1925, which he did not attend, Zhang was re-elected to the Central Bureau despite an objection, and he became head of the Central Workers and Peasants Department. At the Fifth Congress in Wuhan in April 1927, he was elected to the Politburo Standing Committee and became head of organization. After Chen Duxiu resigned as general secretary in July 1927, Zhang temporarily led the work of the Central Committee as one of the five members of its provisional standing committee.

On 26 July 1927, a few hours after Zhou Enlai left Wuhan for Nanchang, the Central Committee sent Zhang after him as its representative. He carried a Comintern telegram stating that the uprising need not take place if there was no chance of victory. An account published by the CCP's news website states that Zhang misread the telegram and obstructed preparations, and that he might have called off the uprising had Zhou Enlai, Tan Pingshan, Li Lisan and others not opposed him. The Nanchang uprising went ahead on 1 August 1927, and Zhang took part in it.

=== Moscow ===
Zhang went to the Soviet Union after the uprising and stayed there until 1931. He attended the Sixth Congress, held in the Soviet Union in 1928, and then served as one of the CCP's representatives to the Comintern in a delegation led by Qu Qiubai. In Moscow, he opposed Wang Ming and the rest of the "28 Bolsheviks", a group of Chinese students there. During the factional disputes at Moscow Sun Yat-sen University, however, he eventually sided with the faction of the Comintern official Pavel Mif. Zhang and the 28 Bolsheviks were mostly reconciled by 1930, and Zhang returned to China. After the Fourth Plenum of the Sixth Central Committee in January 1931, he was named to the Politburo Standing Committee together with Xiang Zhongfa and Zhou Enlai.

=== Leader of the Eyuwan Soviet ===
In Zhang's absence, Li Lisan had become de facto leader of the CCP. His "Li Lisan line" called for the rural soviets to launch immediate attacks on major cities, which had ended in disastrous failure. In the winter of 1930–1931, Zhang and the 28 Bolsheviks ousted Li from power and set about bringing the far-flung rural soviets under more centralized control. Zhang was sent to the Eyuwan Soviet on the border of Hubei, Henan, and Anhui provinces. Zhang came into immediate conflict with the leaders of the Fourth Red Army. Xu Jishen and the other commanders wanted to seize the breadbasket counties in eastern Hubei to fix Eyuwan's chronic food shortages. Zhang compared the plan to Li Lisan's "adventurism", and when they disobeyed his orders and took the land anyway, he got permission from the Central Committee to make Chen Changhao political commissar of the Fourth Red Army. Zhang and Chen accused the Fourth Red Army of acting like a "warlord-bandit" force, pillaging the countryside and rejecting proper discipline. Zhang and Chen then purged the army of hundreds of alleged traitors, including Xu. In November 1931, the First National Soviet Congress at Ruijin elected Zhang a vice-chairman of the Central Executive Committee of the Chinese Soviet Republic, alongside Xiang Ying, although he never took up a post in the central base area.

Zhang's purges expanded during the second half of 1931. Thousands or tens of thousands of party members were arrested and accused of being part of the Reorganizationists, the Anti-Bolshevik League, or the Third Party. In some counties, Zhang even set up secret police. Zhang's main justification for the purge was that the local party was too strongly intertwined with local gentry and the traditional rural power structure. He argued that this had prevented the party from carrying out land reform properly, and land reform under Zhang went much further than it had in previous years. Zhang appointed a Red Army officer named Gao Jingting as chairman of the Eyuwan Soviet. Gao had a reputation for brutality against rich peasants and landlords. In order to "comb out" rich peasants, any Red Army soldiers who were literate were dismissed. The purges led to opposition against Zhang from wide sections of the party and peasantry. They eventually came to an end during the latter half of 1932. Soldiers who had been purged for their literacy but had stayed with the Red Army were allowed to rejoin and in some instances promoted.

The overall impact and scale of the purges are disputed. Estimates of the number arrested and killed range from the low thousands to 10,000. Historian William Rowe argues that this "meant... the near final extinction of the Party's base of indigenous supporters" in Eyuwan, but most other historians disagree. Gregor Benton points out that almost all of the purged cadres were replaced with other local supporters since there were very few non-native Communists in the region. Tony Saich argues that the Red Army's continued success showed that the purges had not affected the army's fighting capacity. In early 1932, the Fourth Red Army had helped defeat the Third Encirclement Campaign and reached 30,000 soldiers.

=== Sichuan–Shaanxi and the Long March ===
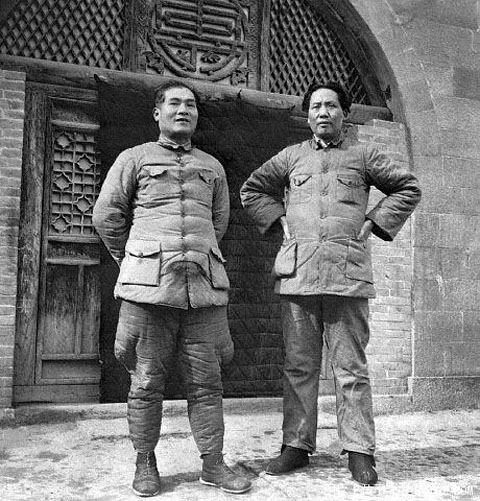
Zhang with Mao Zedong in Yan'an, 1938

In 1932, the Nationalists' fourth encirclement campaign broke the Fourth Red Army and forced Zhang to lead a retreat westwards. The main force lost half of its troops during the fighting and the retreat that followed, and it was reduced to 15,000 men. Under continued Nationalist pressure, Zhang moved his base several times, and by 1935 his forces were based in the border area between Sichuan and Shaanxi.

In June 1935, Zhang's Fourth Front Army joined Mao's First Front Army, which was then on the Long March, at Maogong in Sichuan. According to the Toronto Star, Zhang's army numbered more than 80,000 while Mao had about 10,000 troops. Historian Liu Tong gives figures of about 90,000 and 10,000. At a Politburo meeting at Lianghekou on 26 June, the party leadership resolved to move north and build a base in the Sichuan–Shaanxi–Gansu region. Zhang pressed for nine Fourth Front Army cadres to be added to the Politburo, and in August the party Secretariat was reorganized to include him. According to Liu Tong, the party center made major concessions at a meeting at Maoergai, admitting Xu Xiangqian and Chen Changhao to the Politburo.

The two leaders remained divided over strategy. Zhang wanted to move south into Sichuan and Xikang, while Mao and Zhou insisted on moving north. In August 1935, the combined forces were divided into two columns. Mao, Zhang Wentian and Zhou Enlai traveled with the right column, and Zhang, Zhu De and Liu Bocheng traveled with the left. According to the official account, on 9 September 1935, Zhang sent a secret telegram to Chen Changhao and others in the right column, ordering them to turn south and "thoroughly carry out inner-party struggle". In this account, Ye Jianying, the right column's chief of staff, obtained the telegram and passed it to Mao, and in the early hours of 10 September the Central Committee left with the First and Third Armies and headed north. On 12 September, an enlarged Politburo meeting at Ejie adopted a decision on Zhang's errors.

Mao's descriptions of the telegram changed over time. In 1937 he quoted it as calling for inner-party struggle, while in 1971 he said that Zhang had threatened to "thoroughly settle" the leadership if it refused to go south. The writer Dai Qing has noted that the story rests largely on Mao's later statements, and that two radio operators said that Zhang never sent such a telegram and that Xu Xiangqian and Chen Changhao never received one.

On 5 October 1935, at Zhuomudiao, Zhang set up a separate party leadership with himself as chairman and expelled Mao, Zhou Enlai, Bo Gu and Zhang Wentian from the party. According to Xinhua, he also ordered their arrest. Zhang's forces then moved south, and within three months they had lost more than half of their troops to Nationalist attacks. Lin Yuying, acting in the name of a Comintern representative, telegraphed Zhang, who then gave up his rival leadership and turned north again. Zhang announced the dissolution of his rival central leadership on 6 June 1936. In October 1936, the Second and Fourth Front Armies joined the First Front Army in Gansu, which completed the Long March.

=== West Route Army ===
In October 1936, more than 21,800 troops of the Fourth Front Army crossed the Yellow River westward under a plan to take Ningxia. After the plan was abandoned, the Central Committee and the Central Military Commission ordered on 11 November that the force be organized as the West Route Army and sent into the Hexi Corridor. The army fought the Ma clique forces of Ma Bufang, and it was defeated by March 1937. Li Xiannian led more than 700 survivors across the Qilian Mountains and the Gobi to Xingxingxia on the border of Xinjiang. Mao later said that the army's failure showed the final bankruptcy of Zhang's line.

=== Yan'an ===
In March 1937, an enlarged Politburo meeting at Yan'an criticized Zhang's political line. Mao and Zhang Wentian led the criticism, and the meeting adopted a decision on his errors. In a statement dated 8 April 1937, Zhang acknowledged that his errors amounted to a mistaken line marked by right opportunism and warlordism. He then accepted a post in the government of the Shaan-Gan-Ning Border Region.

== Defection ==
In early April 1938, Zhang represented the border region government at the Qingming rites at the Mausoleum of the Yellow Emperor. After the ceremony, Kuomintang officials invited him to Xi'an, where he left the rest of the delegation and stayed at a Nationalist guesthouse with only his bodyguard. On 7 April, he boarded a train for Wuhan despite a telephone appeal from Lin Boqu, the Communist representative in Xi'an, to return to Yan'an. When the train reached Hankou on 11 April, a team led by Li Kenong, sent by Zhou Enlai, met him at the station. Zhou Enlai tried to win him back, but Zhang, who had made contact with the Nationalist intelligence chief Dai Li, told the party that he had chosen to withdraw from it. When he met Chiang Kai-shek, Zhang reportedly said that he had "been confused for a long time".

On 18 April 1938, the Central Committee expelled Zhang from the party, and the decision was published in the Xinhua Daily on 22 April. The border region government removed him from his posts on 5 May. On 6 May, he issued an open letter to his compatriots in which he argued that the CCP's line rested on a flawed reading of the Chinese revolution and called his expulsion unjust. He urged the party to accept the leadership of Chiang and the Kuomintang, merge its forces into the national army and dissolve the border region government. Zhang had kept his plans secret from his wife, Yang Zilie, who learned of them only about a month later, when she received a letter asking her to join him in Hankou with their son Haiwei.

== Kuomintang years ==
Chiang assigned Zhang to Dai Li's Bureau of Investigation and Statistics, where he was given the rank of major general and headed a research office on "special political problems". He also ran a training class for agents, which closed after its second session. His proposals for subversion and intelligence stations aimed at Communist-held areas produced no results, and Dai's favor gradually turned to resentment. Zhang was later given a seat on an anti-communist planning committee of the Kuomintang's Organization Department, a post with little real work.

At the end of 1940, Chiang appointed Zhang to the People's Political Council, and he served on the second, third and fourth councils despite objections from Communist members. After the war, he held a post with the Jiangxi branch of the Nationalist government's relief administration, but he was pushed out by the provincial chairman and moved to Shanghai. In June 1948, he founded the anti-communist weekly Chuangjin in Shanghai, which he closed later that year. He moved to Taiwan with his family in November 1948 and to Hong Kong in 1949.

== Exile and death ==
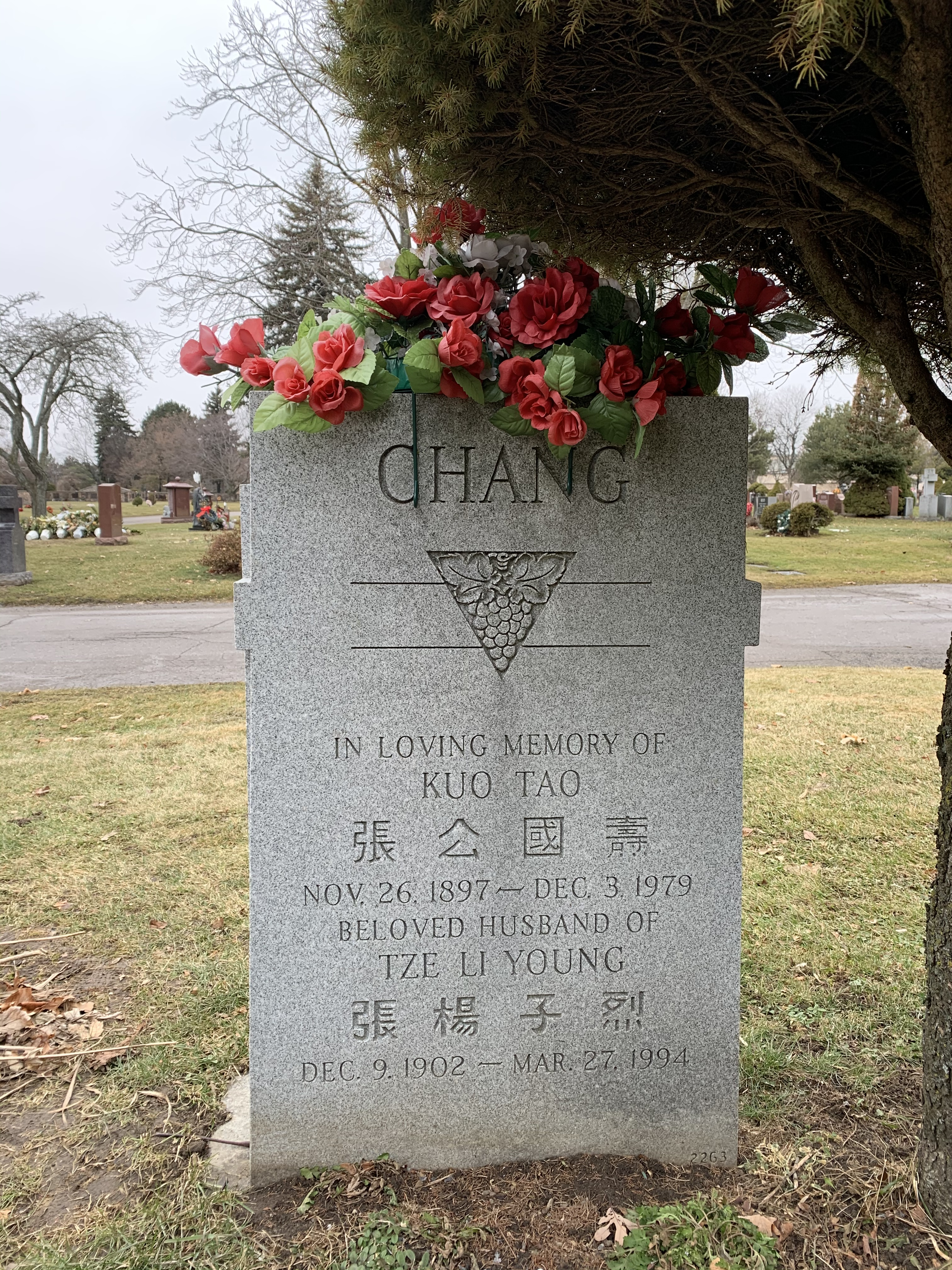
Zhang's grave at Pine Hills Cemetery

In 1953, the American scholar Robert A. Burton received a Ford Foundation grant to help exiled former Communist leaders in Hong Kong, including Zhang, compose their memoirs. He worked on the project until 1958 as a research associate affiliated with the University of Washington. In 1956, Time quoted Zhang, then a refugee in Hong Kong, as saying that Luo Ruiqing had purged the anti-Mao faction of the Fourth Front Army with "savagery and maliciousness", which in Zhang's view had earned Luo the gratitude of Mao. Burton later edited Zhang's English-language memoirs, The Rise of the Chinese Communist Party, which the University Press of Kansas published in two volumes covering the years 1921 to 1927 and 1928 to 1938.

In 1968, Zhang emigrated to Canada with his wife to join their two sons, who were already living in Toronto. He gave his only interview in 1974, when he told a Canadian Press reporter, "I have washed my hands of politics". In 1978, he converted to Christianity under the influence of a Chinese scholar, Zhang Li Sang. After suffering several strokes, he died in a Scarborough nursing home on 3 December 1979 at the age of 82. He was buried in Section 5 of Pine Hills Cemetery in Scarborough. His wife died in 1994.

== Legacy ==
Mao later told Edgar Snow that his struggle with Zhang in the grasslands in 1935 was the darkest moment of his life, when the party faced a split and possibly civil war. In her 2006 history of the Long March, the writer and producer Sun Shuyun, although critical of Zhang, argued that there was no evidence of the "secret telegram" in which Zhang had supposedly planned to use force against the Central Committee. She also noted that the official History of the Chinese Communist Party was revised in 2002 to state that Zhang had not ordered the West Route Army into Gansu to build up his own power base, and that all its orders had come from the Central Committee.

Liu Tong has written that earlier party histories blamed nearly everything on Zhang. He also observed that since the 1980s many articles have sought to rehabilitate the West Route Army or have stressed Mao's "conspiracy", a shift he described as a swing from the far left to the far right. In February 2026, the PLA Daily wrote that Zhang had split the party and the Red Army during the Long March, which some observers read as a possible allusion to general Zhang Youxia.
