= G7012 Fuzhou–Ji'an Expressway =

Road in Jiangxi, China

Fuzhou–Ji'an Expressway
- 抚州－吉安高速公路
- Fuji Expressway 抚吉高速公路

Route information
- Auxiliary route of G70
- Length: 179.19 km (111.34 mi)

Major junctions
- West end: Jiangxi S69 in Jizhou, Ji'an, Jiangxi
- East end: G70 / G7021 in Linchuan, Fuzhou, Jiangxi

Location
- Country: China

Highway system
- National Trunk Highway System; Primary; Auxiliary; National Highways; Transport in China
← G7011	→ G7013

The G7012 Fuzhou–Ji'an Expressway (Chinese: 抚州—吉安高速公路), also referred to as the Fuji Expressway (Chinese: 抚吉高速公路), is an expressway in Jiangxi, China that connects the cities of Fuzhou and Ji'an.

== Route ==
The route begins in Fuzhou, passing through Chongren, Yihuang, Le'an, Yongfeng, and Jishui, before ending in Ji'an. The first section of the expressway was opened to traffic on 31 December 2012 as the Jiangxi Provincial Expressway S46, with the entire route being opened to traffic on 6 February 2013.
