= Wang Zongfang and Wang Zongwei =

Chinese brothers and serial killers

- 王宗坊 王宗玮
- Zongwei (left) and Zongfang (right), depicted in a composite image from their portraits on wanted posters
- Born: Wang Zongfang: 1952 or 1953; Wang Zongwei: 1956 or 1957; Shenyang, Liaoning, China
- Died: 18 September 1983 (aged 30 and 26); Guangchang County, Jiangxi, China
- Other name: Northeast Er Wang (东北二王)
- Years active: 12 February – 18 September 1983
- Motive: Robbery
- Reward amount: ¥2,000

Details
- Date: 12 February 1983; 17 February 1983; 23 March 1983
- Country: China
- States: Liaoning; Hunan; Hubei; Jiangxi (murders)
- Killed: 10
- Injured: 11+
- Weapon: Four Type 54 pistols

Wang Zongfang (Chinese: 王宗坊; (Note: Sometimes written 王宗方) 1952 or 1953 – 18 September 1983) and Wang Zongwei (Chinese: 王宗玮; 1956 or 1957 – 18 September 1983), commonly called Er Wang (Chinese: 二王; lit. 'Two Wangs') were a pair of Chinese brothers, robbers, and serial killers who committed a series of robberies across northeastern, central, and eastern China.

Following a botched hospital robbery that killed four people, the Wang brothers fled their hometown and spent seven months travelling southwards through China as bandits. They killed five people along the way in three more shootings in Hengyang and Wuhan before being surrounded in an extensive six-day encirclement within a large forest near Fuzhou, Jiangxi. The Wang brothers were killed in a shootout with military and police forces after killing a member of the search team.

The Wang brothers were the first criminals in modern-day China to be assigned a bounty by the Ministry of Public Security, a system previously abolished since the founding of the People's Republic of China. Due to their crimes taking places in several different provinces, the brothers achieved national infamy during a time when reports on criminal cases were largely limited to local coverage.

The "Er Wang case" ("二王事件"/"二王案") or "Er Wang mass murder case" ("二王特大杀人案") was considered a major driving force behind the start of the Strike Hard Against Crime Campaign, and as part of the widespread campaign for their capture, military and police were aided by civilian tip-offs. In reports on their deaths, American media commonly compared the Wang brothers to Wild West outlaws.

== Background ==
Wang Zongfang and Wang Zongwei were natives of Shenyang, Liaoning. They were the two middle children of Wang Chunfang and Wang Jialin, having an older sister and a younger brother. (Note: Before a 2007 archives search by Sanlian Lifeweek, it was commonly reported that the Wang brothers were the youngest of three sons.) Their parents worked as middle school teachers for the Northeastern Machinery Manufacturing Plant (the present-day Shenyang Heavy Machinery Group Co., Ltd.). According to their mother, all four of the Wang children were raised mainly by their maternal grandmother. During the Cultural Revolution, when Wang Zongfang and Wang Zongwei were still children, infighting factions of Red Guards fought on the grounds of the manufacturing plant, with the brothers witnessing the violent clashes between loyalists and rebels, who both made use of guns, knives, and land mines. Their parents speculated that the boys picked up "bad habits" from this time, particularly the resistance against government authorities.

=== Wang Zongfang ===
Wang Zongfang, the older brother, was noted as a pickpocket since elementary school, attending education until junior high school. He taught himself how to pick locks and was arrested twice for burglary in 1974 and 1975. He married in 1979 and the same year, only three days after the wedding, Wang Zongfang was caught stealing supplies while working as a pharmacist at Liaoshen Health Centre in Shenyang's Dadong district as part of his militia service. He fled from the authorities, after which his mother left her workplace without notice to find her son. It was later discovered that she sheltered him at a relative's house, for which she was criminally prosecuted. Wang Zongfang served a three-year laojiao sentence for theft and was released in February 1982, now unemployed.

=== Wang Zongwei ===
Wang Zongwei, the younger brother, entered service with the People's Liberation Army (PLA) in December 1976. He had previously graduated only basic schooling, but was noted for his athleticism, particularly basketball. In March 1976, at age 19 and a few months before his enlistment, he and his brother had broken into a duty room of Dabei Prison and stolen three pistols, with an investigation ending without conclusion in June. He was trained as a sharpshooter in the PLA Air Force and stationed in Inner Mongolia for three years, serving as a squad leader. He regularly stole ammunition without notice during this time, having written his brother in June 1978 that he already obtained 100 boxes of 7.62 mm caliber. Wang Zongwei was noted to have taken leave to return to Shenyang in 1979 upon hearing of his brother's arrest but returned shortly after, with later suspicions he went to check if it was related to their previous weapons theft. When he was demobilised in January 1980, he was able to sneak five hand grenades into his bags. In August 1980, he was hired as a quality control clerk at the Northeastern Machinery Manufacturing Plant, assigned to the No. 6 iron workshop of the No. 724 Factory in Tiexi district. Although his work was unremarkable, filing in poorly written run-on sentence reports with numerous spelling errors, Wang Zongwei was well-liked for his charming and polite personality, being named as a "Socialist Spiritual Civilization Model" in a majority vote by fellow factory workers and party cadres in January 1983. He was easily recognised by others, standing 183 cm tall.

== No. 463 Shenyang Hospital shooting ==
On 12 February 1983, Wang Zongwei and Wang Zongfang entered the No. 463 PLA Air Force Hospital of Shenyang Military Region (the PLA Northern Theater Command Air Force Hospital since 2016) in Wanquan subdistrict. Wang Zongfang had suggested the military hospital as a target based on his previous experience of working at and stealing from a government-run pharmacy, due to comparably low security for decently valued items. The Wang brothers were planning to steal from the building's cafeteria, as the majority of staff were attending a movie screening at a separate clubhouse for Chinese New Year's Eve at noon. At about 12:40, Wang Zongfang entered the grounds first, pushing along a Wuyang bike, with Wang Zongwei, dressed in an Air Force uniform and mask, following a few metres behind. A soldier, Wu Yongchun, who had left the screening to get something from his barracks, took notice of the unauthorized entries and told his superior Zhou Huamin about the suspicious men. After hearing that someone broke into the canteen, Wu and Zhou went looking for the intruders, finding Wang Zongwei, now dressed in undersized civilian clothes, loitering outside the clubhouse. While Zhou checked Wang Zongwei's only identification, his factory pass, Wu staked out the military grounds in his jeep, soon discovering Wang Zongfang, riding in circles on his bike and wearing his brother's uniform, complete with a fake collar insignia. Wu quickly wrestled Wang Zongfang to the ground and after finding stolen cigarettes and a pair of pliers on him, the suspected thief was carried into the hospital by PLA officer Liu Fushan and cook Wang. While the cook left to check on the canteen, Wu, along with five other staff members, detained Wang Zongfang in an inpatient room. Meanwhile, Zhou separately questioned Wang Zongwei alone in a surgical theatre across the hall.

After officer Liu identified and tore off the fake insignia from Wang Zongfang's disguise, unlocking of his suitcase revealed that the brothers stole around 1,000 yuan, another three cartons of Fenghuang brand cigarettes, and thirty plastic packets of glutamate, having used an awl and a second pair of pliers to break into the cafeteria's staff-only area. The cook Wang confirmed that the former items were missing from the inventory and were worth 2,000 yuan. Wu Yongchun and recruit Bi Jibing then put Wang Zongfang in an armlock for a closer search by Liu Fushan. At this point, the detainee began shaking violently and screaming loudly to alert his brother in the other room. Wang Zongwei used a concealed Type 54 pistol to kill Zhou Huamin in the surgical theatre with two gunshots and then shot Lu Wencheng, who had come to check the noise, in the hall. Most of those inside the doctor's office, who were initially distracted by Wang Zongfang's apparent seizure, barricaded the door and ducked for cover, while Liu armed himself with a metal infusion stand. Upon entry, Wang Zongwei fatally shot Liu as the latter rushed at him, as well as Sun Weijin, an unarmed doctor who was dialling for security. Wu and Bi kept their restrainment of Wang Zongfang to keep him between themselves and Wang Zongwei, but Bi was shot after letting go in an attempt to grab a weapon. Wu continued to restrain the captive, managing to kick Wang Zongwei back a few times before he was shot at close range, falling to the ground. A second shot was fired at Wu by the gunman at the instruction of Wang Zongfang, who said "This kid is the worst, shoot him again" ("这小子最坏，再给他一枪"). The Wang brothers fled, leaving behind four dead and three seriously injured. 13 gunshots had been fired in total.

The brothers rode their bike back to the house of their parents, where they had attended reunion dinner with their grandmother, as well as Wang Zongwei's fiancée and four-year-old daughter just hours earlier. Their parents initially believed that the pair had been involved in a simple fight and were not directly told of the specifics of their crime. Wang Zongfang stated it "didn't matter anymore" and there was "no use saying anything now". According to their father, he realised that something bad had happened from seeing the gun and hearing Wang Zongwei wonder aloud about the future of his daughter with the comment "it doesn't matter if I die". The Wang brothers stayed for around five minutes, leaving at about 14:50, grabbing the mailing address of some overseas relatives. While their father gave the brothers his wrist watch and their mother offered them money, Wang Zongwei's fiancée only told them "You screwed me over" ("你们坑了我").

Wu Yongchun, although shot through both cheeks and the neck, was able to walk outside, holding his hat to the neck wound to hem the bleeding. He alerted his colleagues by shouting "Catch the thief, catch the murderer!" ("快抓贼呀！快抓凶手呀!"). At 13:10, the Dadong branch of the Shenyang Public Security Bureau was alerted. The director, the political commissar, and the captain of the criminal investigation team arrived at the hospital fifteen minutes later, followed by armed response officers at 13:35. By 14:10, the Shenyang Municipal Public Security Bureau and the Liaoning Provincial Public Security Department also took part in the investigation, with municipal authorities questioning locals about potential sightings of the perpetrators as they fled the scene. A kitchen worker, Su Guirong, told police that she saw the gunman handing over a card before the shooting, which was eventually found in the hands of one of the injured, Li Zuozhou. Though all the injured were unconscious, Su confirmed the find through the ID's picture. Wang Zongwei was quickly identified as the main perpetrator from his pass, as well as a shoulder bag with tools he had left behind. His brother Wang Zongfang was determined to be the accomplice minutes after the finding. The gun used was also identified as having been stolen six years earlier with two others, with the description of two suspicious individuals seen at the time (one short and one tall man) matching the Wang brothers. Public security was dispatched to Shenyang's train stations and major roadways at 15:30. It was ultimately found that the Wang brothers had boarded the No. 47 Train to Guangzhou, with a stop-over in Beijing, at Wenguantun railway station, only thirty minutes before police gave the order. Shortly after midnight on 13 February, a nationwide warrant was placed on the Wang brothers for murder and robbery, who were now the 13th ongoing criminal case directly processed by the Ministry of Public Security (MPS). Since the Wang family had relatives in British Hong Kong and the United States, it was believed that the brothers might try to cross onto foreign territory once in Guangdong, possibly to leave the continent altogether.

For their efforts to apprehend the Wang brothers, the four fatalities were recognised as revolutionary martyrs by the Shenyang Military Region Air Force. Survivors Wu Yongchun and Lu Wencheng were given second-class and third-class merit awards respectively. The dead were buried in the CPV Martyrs' Cemetery in Shenyang.

== Manhunt ==
Liu Wen, Director of the Criminal Investigation Bureau of the Ministry of Public Security, was put in charge of the investigation. He travelled to most sightings of the Wang brothers by bus, since the ministry didn't have other means of long-distance travel to remote areas, purchasing an early model mobile phone with a radio function. Liu personally participated in several raids, arrests, and interrogations, though all ended up being false intel or impostors.

=== Hengyang shootings ===
On the evening of 15 February 1983, two days after the Shenyang hospital shooting, the No. 47 Train, travelling on the Beijing–Guangzhou railway, was about to pull into the railway station of Xiliping, a village in Hunan's Hengnan County. At around 21:00, the Wang brothers were subjected to a search in their carriage, as part of a seasonal policy during chunyun to prevent the dangerous transport of firecrackers. A train attendant discovered a pistol inside a bag after noticing its shape against the fabric and asked for the owner, with Wang Zongwei confirming it belonged to him. When a police officer asked for a gun licence, Wang Zongwei told the officer that his sleeping older brother had the document. While pretending to wake Wang Zongfang, Wang Zongwei pulled out a second concealed pistol and shot the police officer in the ear, thought to be a missed headshot attempt as a result of the train shaking during the ride. As Wang Zongwei threatened to shoot the accompanying train attendant, as well as other passengers if they interfered, Wang Zongfang, awoken by the commotion, armed himself with the remaining gun, and attempted to force open the doors to no success. Unaware of the exact situation besides the loud bang, the train driver made an emergency stop during which the brothers escaped through a window with all but one piece of their luggage after Wang Zongfang broke the glass. The incident was quickly connected and confirmed by two matching bullet casings, with notices going out in the larger area around Hengyang to look out for the armed fugitives. A few hours later on 16 February, at 2:00, the brothers had Wang Zongfang's cut hand sutured at Hengyang Municipal Metallurgical Hospital, where they also slept for a few hours after breaking into a security room. In Xiaoxiang district, they were reportedly spotted jumping on a truck bound for Leiyang. Correctly assuming that police was expecting them to move south, the brothers moved back north just after exiting the city to hide their tracks.

In the morning of 17 February, around 9:45, Wu Guoying, a security guard for the Hengyang Metallurgical Machinery Plant in Zhuhui district, was inspecting newly constructed staff housing buildings with his wife Jiang Xifei when they found the door to their own sixth-floor apartment locked. With site attendant Zhao Yanlin, Wu and Jiang opened the door to find the Wang brothers eating cake on the floor. Wu had been informed of the fugitives from Liaoning, immediately noting the men's disheveled appearance and their northeastern accents when one claimed they were vagrants waiting for a bus. Upon seeing the handle of a gun in the pocket of Wang Zongwei, Wu told Zhao to keep the men, who had begun packing up their things, from leaving while he went downstairs with his wife to call the security department. Zhao tried to make the Wang brothers stay to fix the door, but they pushed their way past Zhao. Outside the building, a retired worker, Wu Zhenyu, recognized the squatters and attempted to stop the men from using their bicycle before he was pushed off. Wu Zhenyu and Zhao engaged the brothers on a foot chase, with Wu following them into an alley, ducking behind a wall just in time as Wang Zongfang fired at him. Two militiamen standing by as security guards, Jiang Guangxu and Li Aipin, were blocking the other exit of the alley, but Wang Zongwei shot Jiang in the shoulder, allowing the brothers to slip past as Li rendered first aid.

At around 10:45, the brothers were running through the adjoining busy pedestrian street and having left behind their bike near the alley, the brothers mugged a married couple, Zhang Yeliang and Li Ruiling, who worked for Hengyang Electric Power Company and were riding bicycles to visit an aunt. Their teenage daughter Zhang Xiaoqin attempted to prevent the theft of her mother's bike by clinging onto the frame, for which Wang Zongfang fired two gunshots at her, grazing the girl's ear and shoe. Seeing his daughter fall to the ground, Zhang Yeliang lunged at the attackers and was shot in the chest by Wang Zongwei. Li Ruiling then fought with Wang Zongfang, grabbing onto a bag in his hands, in hopes that police could use it to help identify the men. Wang Zongwei shot Li during the struggle, just as she managed to snatch away the bag, with her right hand outstretched in defence. The bullet passed through the arm and shattered part of Li's lower jaw. With Zhang Yeliang dead and his wife and daughter injured, the Wang brothers took the parents' bikes and fled. It was later discovered that the bag taken by Li Ruiling contained 36 rounds of ammo and five hand grenades.

Having witnessed the shooting from afar, worker Liu Chongyang and militiaman Fu Yuehua followed the Wang brothers on their own bicycles. Fu lost his balance from the frantic pursuit, while Liu was shot in the waist by Wang Zongwei. 5,000 officers were deployed to surveil all roads out of town and search various entertainment venues for any signs of the brothers. The Wang brothers were able to circumvent the heavy police presence by stowing away on a train at the nearby railway station, jumping off at Chashan'ao railway station just outside of Hengyang. At 11:00, they briefly went to a house to ask for water, but disappeared not long after.

The Hengyang Metallurgical Machinery Plant Party Committee awarded Wu Guoying, Wu Zhenyu, and Liu Chongyang with first-class merits, one level salary increases and a 60 yuan bonus. The committee recommended the same for Li Ruiling to her employer. MPS considered it unlikely that the Wang brothers would flee either further south or back north due to increasing police presence in either direction. Investigators instead believed that the Wang brothers would stay in the country's central region, most likely going for either Changsha or Wuhan.

=== Wuhan shootings ===
On 3 March, the brothers broke into a physical therapy room at Wuhan No. 4 Hospital in Hanyang district, intending to sleep there for the night. Shortly after 18:00, Zhou Jianyuan, a medical intern, entered the room to retrieve some food she left there. Wang Zongfang snatched her from behind and put his hand over her mouth, demanding to know who had sent her here. Zhou bit down on her captor's hand, ripping open a bandage, before Wang Zongwei pistol-whipped her until she went unconscious. They fled the scene afterwards, with the intern reporting the incident to building security after waking up. It was found that the two beds were moved to a window for a quick escape route. Bloodstains and the leftover bandage were also found at the scene. Fingerprints and a shattered piece of handguard from the pistol confirmed the involvement of the Wang brothers.

On 23 March, at around 10:15, Wang Zongfang was stopped by police officer Li Xinyan and militiaman Xiong Jiguo on the Daishan Bridge checkpoint in Jiang'an district, at the Huangxiao River. They were suspicious of him because his bike did not have a registration plate and he was lying by claiming to have done so inside a police station, when registration was actually in jurisdiction of the traffic department. Wang Zongfang was brought inside the checkpoint hut by Li and Xiong, being followed by his brother, who had stayed a distance behind earlier. During interrogation with Daishan Bridge checkpoint chief Wang Yun, Wang Zongfang's pistol was discovered by Li. Wang Zongfang was held down by Li and Xiong while Wang Yun pulled out his own gun. A passerby, Chen Zhenjian, overheard the commotion and joined the effort to restrain the detainee, attempting to take his gun. His brother's shouts alerted Wang Zongwei, who was hiding in a restroom across the street, rushing into the station and shooting ten times at the men fighting with Wang Zongfang. Wang Yun, Li Xinyan, and Chen Zhenjian were killed, while Xiong was injured and rendered unconscious. Before leaving, the brothers stole the station chief's handgun. A motorist found the crime scene shortly after and alerted Daishan police station, one kilometre away. Three officers went towards the checkpoint and spotted the Wang brothers escaping eastwards. However, only one officer was armed and during the ensuing shootout, the officer's gun jammed, allowing the Wang brothers to escape.

While two officers retreated to inform the municipal public security bureau, officer Zhao Bin ran after the brothers, who had taken a road leading to a cul-de-sac in Houhu subdistrict, with only two buildings at its end. Outside the Wuhan Zhanghang Research Institute, Zhao and a militiaman, Ma Bingqiang, found an ammo clip in a drainage tunnel under the wall and searched the institute for the fugitives. Unbeknownst to them, the brothers had instead gone to the other building, the Wuhan Bearing Factory, after disposing one of their bags in the drain, and were hiding in a hollow space of the outside wall. At around 10:50, Zhan Xiaojian, a worker of the factory, was riding a bike with his two-year-old son on the factory's grounds to go buy groceries. As Zhan passed by the hiding spot of the Wang brothers, Wang Zongwei shot the man in the head and stole the bicycle, leaving behind the crying toddler. The brothers fled into the institute grounds, but there were no other exits. Police believed they had cornered the brothers, but they escaped back out through the drainage hole and blended into the crowd. In coordination with provincial, municipal, and other city law enforcement more road blocks were set up around the city, by which point the brothers had already left the city.

According to MPS director Liu Wen, when he inspected the scene, several bystanders mocked the police for their apparent incomptence, saying "The Public Security Bureau might as well rename itself the Grain Bureau!" ("公安局干脆换牌子，改叫粮食局算了！"), based on the perception that the bureau "eats but doesn't work". The Wuhan shooting of police officers also caused the emergence of unfounded rumours, such as that the brothers were both expert marksmen and that they killed at any opportunity rather than during the commission of other crimes. It was also often repeated that Wang Zongwei shot the five victims in the Daishan Bridge shooting with five gunshots as a supposed example of his accuracy.

=== Wanted bounty ===
In May 1983, as a part of the campaign against spiritual pollution, the Public Security Ministry intensified their manhunt, issuing its first Class-A warrant since the Cultural Revolution. Peng Zhen of the Central Political and Legal Affairs Commission stated in regards to the Wang brothers, "If alive, we must see them in person, if dead, we must see their corpses" ("活要见人，死要见尸！"). Wanted posters with an accompanying bounty were reintroduced following their discontinuation in the 1950s, when the communist government encouraged civilians to cooperate with police without incentives. These posters, designed were only distributed through official government organs and most commonly airdropped by plane, with the notice "Only for posting, not for broadcast or publishing" ("只许张贴，不准广播登报") printed on the back of each. Reward money ranged from 500 yuan for any viable information, 1,000 yuan for information leading to arrest and 2,000 yuan (US$1,021 at the time) for the capture of the Wang brothers; an average college-educated worker had a monthly salary of 50 yuan. Security was also heightened in Henan, Shanghai, Jiangsu, Jiangxi, Shandong, and Anhui. While police were also swamped with misinformation, several hints turned out to be correct, allowing for a relatively accurate map of movement for the Wang brothers. Simultaneously, with increasing awareness of the Wang brothers and their crimes, there was a spike in suspected copycat crime committed, with perpetrators hoping that the acts would be blamed on the fugitives. Reports were easily falsified by telling police about a short man and a tall man, which was the basic description of the Wang brothers. Some of those arrested even falsely claimed to be "Er Wang" to interrogators upon arrest for notoriety. Over the summer of 1983, Liu Wen went to Guangdong, Anhui, Jiangsu, Hubei, Henan, Shaanxi, and Hebei to investigate these cases. He later estimated that he went to around 100 locations, getting a bulletproof vest at each public security bureau. Two more prominent capture attempts took the form of an encirclement of Guangzhou's Baiyun Mountain and a large-scale helicopter-aided search in Wuhan. Amid the ongoing search and increasing internal criticism, Deng Xiaoping convened with other party leaders at Beidaihe to discuss stronger policies against crime.

In the afternoon hours of 29 August 1983, the Wang brothers mugged a pair of accountants at a department store in Huaiyin, Jiangsu. The women were walking on the street carrying the store's earnings to a bank when Wang Zongfang ran past them and took their handbags, containing 21,000 yuan. He escaped the scene by jumping on the pillion of the bike driven by Wang Zongwei. By this point, the brothers were seen carrying mosquito nets and other camping gear for rough sleeping in the wilderness. Over the next two weeks, the Wang brothers travelled across Anhui to Jiangxi, with authorities believing that they were looking for an alternative route into Guangdong or Fujian to escape the country via sea.

According to the CIA-run Foreign Broadcast Information Service, the Wang brothers were rumoured to steal from households for food and forcing residents to delay reporting until eight hours had passed under threat of death while travelling through more populated areas in the past.

=== Guangchang County ===
On the morning of 13 September 1983, the Wang brothers were spotted in the mountainous region of Guangchang County, Jiangxi. 28-year-old Liu Jianping, a staff member of the Guangchang County Civil Affairs Bureau, said that he saw the brothers at around 8:00 at Xiangyang Local Products Shop in Guangchang's Xujiang town. He spotted Wang Zongwei first, becoming suspicious because he wore a large straw hat and sunglasses despite the rainy weather, was constantly crouching over his bike, and had his face smeared with dark oil paint. Liu followed Wang Zongwei long enough to see him meet with Wang Zongfang, wearing the same disguise, at a post office, hearing the latter speak Standard Mandarin, which wasn't in common informal use in the area. After briefly following the men, who kept a constant distance to each other, Liu went to the local Chengguan office and informed station chief Zou Zhixiong, suspecting the men were criminal fugitives. The brothers had left town by the time Liu and Zou went to the shop they were last seen at, but Zou believed they were heading south for the highway out of the province.

Together with Liu Jianping, Zou Zhixiong decided to go after the fugitives and while arming themselves at the Guangchang County Public Security Bureau, they recruited police officer Liu Xipeng to their cause. Outside the police station, they flagged down a van driven by Chen Bushan, a worker of the county's hydropower bureau and together, the four men drove to Yangongling, around 1,6 km outside of town. During the drive, they overtook the Wang brothers, catching a glimpse of their faces and the guns they carried without being noticed. At the Xiaogang road, Zou ordered Chen to park the van on a side path concealed by vegetation. Chen stayed in the van, while the police officers Zou and Liu and the civilian Liu hid behind trees around 20 metres from the main road. When the Wang brothers passed by, Zou jumped from his hiding spot and ordered the men's surrender. Caught off-guard, the brothers fell from their bikes as they braked, with Wang Zongwei screaming "It's over, it's over!" ("完了, 完了！). Still on the ground, Wang Zongfang opened fire on the officers, initiating a shootout with the armed officers, who ducked for cover behind the trees. Wang Zongfang exited the gunbattle early by hiding in a ditch. Zou ordered Chen and Liu Jianping to return to town and bring backup; their van was protected from gunfire from the Wang brothers by the treeline and suppressive fire by the officers. Using the brief cover of a passing truck, Wang Zongwei joined his brother in the ditch, and together they fled east into a rice paddy field.

Only the arrival of additional law enforcement identified the shooters as the Wang brothers. They had left behind their bikes, their shoes, and a backpack, containing 8,700 yuan, camping gear, a map, the tops of a military and a police uniform, a semiconductor radio, and two pistols, one of which was confirmed to belong to the murdered police officer Wang Yun via the serial number. Guangchang County Public Security Bureau Director Hu Shunbao ordered a full response of People's Armed Police, with three groups to sweep the area for the Wang brothers. Li Zhoutian, an 18-year-old off-duty junior communications officer, appeared at the on-site briefing of Zou Zhixiong at 10:10 and while traversing his usual beat for clues, he encountered Liu Yungui, who said his bike was stolen by two gun-wielding barefoot men. Questioning of local farmers revealed that Liu's father chased after the thieves with a harpoon, but lost them in the Ganjiang River. Li spent over two hours trekking three hills, finding the discarded bicycle on the way and leaving behind personal documents in the crevices of sign posts so his colleagues could trace his path. He ended up spotting the Wang brothers from a distance, 10 kilometres from the Xiaogang road shooting site, as they entered the woods of the Ganjiang Forest Farm. They were too far away to be tracked further, but Li informed some fellow officers who followed after him of his findings at 12:40.

Within three hours, two circular blockades were formed around Ganjiang Forest Farm, with a circumference of 30 kilometres. By 1:00 of 14 September, a third circle with a circumference of 171 km was established. Overnight, Wang Zhaorong (a member of the Standing Committee of the Jiangxi Provincial Party Committee and Secretary of the Political and Legal Affairs Commission), Shen Zhongxiang (Deputy Commander of the Provincial Military Region) and Sun Shusen (Director of the Provincial Public Security Department and Political Commissar of the Armed Police Force), were directed to Guangchang city to direct the search effort with various county party leaders. The same day, all males aged 18 to 45 in the counties of Guangchang, Nanfeng, Ningdu, and Shicheng, as well as Jianning of neighbouring Fujian, were conscripted to take part in the search alongside each county's security bureau, under the command of Nanchang Security Bureau director Wang Weicheng and deputy director Yang Xilin. A total of around 50,000 people participated in the search effort, mostly military, police and militia. The collaborative search included around 25,000 People's Armed Police, (Note: Commonly misreported as People's Liberation Army) including some from Fuzhou and Ganzhou, 25,000 militiamen, and 600 to 700 Public Security officers.

Fourteen sniffer dogs, trained on the scent of one of Wang Zongwei's discarded shoes, were sent in by Ningdu County Public Security Bureau.. Thirteen of them were recalled by the end of the first day due to exhaustion, with one of the dogs dying from dehydration while being carried out of the mountains. The remainder of the K-9 unit, German Shepherd Wei Nan and his handler Xie Zhusheng, never picked up a trail during the first five days. At least one PLA helicopter was called in to fly over the area to aid in the search. The MPS issued a direct order to Jiangxi Provincial Security Bureau, stating, "Make every effort to encircle and annihilate "Er Wang" in Guangchang and eliminate this threat to the people!" ("尽一切努力，将‘二王’围歼在广昌，为民除害！").

== Death ==
On the night of 18 September, at around 1:00, 16-year-old Zeng Shuixiu reported that she had encountered two strangers carrying bamboo passing by her house in Zengjia village, evidently outsiders as they did not speak the local Gan dialect. Together with her father, Zeng Wenquan, and a neighbour, He Fengzhen, they set out to reported this to Guanqian brigade authorities four kilometres away. Because the use of phones was not widespread in the area, the local commune leader Wang Xiyuan drove the three witnesses to Guangcheng. This information, although first miscommunicated as a food theft, further limited the search area to Jianfeng township, with two search parties of police officers and soldiers, led by Sun Shusen and Yang Xilin, dispatched by 6:00.

For the first time, police dog Wei Nan successfully tracked traces of one of the Wang brothers, which led to the discovery of some 28 cm footprints. After roughly 12 hours of searching, just past 18:00, criminal investigator Gao Huaiyu spotted two men slipping down a slope of Nankeng mountain. After ascending the mountain, police chief Zou Zhixiong discovered a straw-covered alcove as the brothers' hideout. Wang Zongwei was hidden in some nearby tall grass, where he was inadvertently discovered by Huang Lisheng, a member of the Second Detachment of the Jiangxi Provincial Armed Police Corps, who had tripped and slid down the slope past his hiding spot, snagging his foot on Wang Zongwei's leg as he did so. Wang Zongwei had already pulled out his gun when deputy squad leader Gan Xiangqing, who had come to check on Huang and also stumbled over the leg, shouted about the presence in the grass. Gan was then shot in the abdomen at close distance, piercing his liver. Wang Zongwei emerged from the grass and attempted to take Gan's submachine gun, but People's Armed Police officer Zheng Wanshou incapacitated Wang Zongwei by shooting him in the left shoulder blade, the bullet exiting through his jaw. As Wang Zongwei reached for a bamboo stick, one to three police dogs pounced him. Wei Nan bit down on his left hand, preventing him from attempting escape. When the dog handler reached Wang Zongwei to ready him for transport, the captive kept repeating "I'm a good man" ("我是个好人"), which turned out to have been a signal for the other brother to open fire. Shortly after the handler had dragged Wang Zongwei from his spot and handed him to three other officers, Wang Zongfang revealed himself from another hiding spot and fired five shots at Zheng, but he evaded the shots by jumping into a ditch. Wang Zongfang was able to retrieve his brother's gun and fled northeast. Zheng took aim at the fleeing brother, but caused a firing malfunction by pulling the bolt of his submachine gun too often.

With one brother captured, the other on the run and police officer Gan Xiangqing requiring medical treatment, the troop decided to descend at 18:25, carrying the captive and the critically injured officer. After calling in the situation via radio, the command headquarters suggested the team set up camp at the site to rest up and look for Wang Zongfang in the morning, as they wanted to avoid casualties given poor nighttime visibility and the men's exhaustion. The three team leads at the temporary camp, Feng Changming, Huang Xiangmin, and Liu Degui, disagreed with this, believing that Wang Zongfang, as the less dangerous of the duo, would be easier to capture, also fearing that he could flee during this time. However, Wang Zongfang had actually followed the troop in the bushes, which was noticed, but as the armed troops approached his location, Wang Zongfang fatally shot communications officer Wu Zengxing five times in the abdomen, as Wu was telling base command of the second brother's presence. Wu fired four shots at Wang before collapsing, indicating to his colleagues where Wang Zongfang roughly stood in the darkness. During a 20-minute shootout, soldiers fired 48 volleys of gunfire at Wang Zongfang, who died of nine gunshots from the neck to the thighs. Eight of the shots were fired by the squad of Cao Xueli and the Fuzhou Detachment, while the ninth one was fired at close range by acting platoon leader Liu Shuiming, which incapacitated him fully by striking the left shoulder, passing into the right arm and exiting through the right hand's palm. Wang Zongfang's death was confirmed at 18:40. Wang Zongwei died two hours later from blood loss while he was being carried towards Guangchang city. Wu Zengxing also died along the way from three of the gunshots.

Wang Zongwei carried a knife and 20 rounds of ammunition on him. He was also discovered to have strapped a case filled with 13,000 yuan to his calf. The remaining two guns were identified as Type 54 pistols, stolen from the Shenyang prison in 1976. The remainder of their items amounted to an additional 32 rounds of ammunition, a letter mailed from the brothers' uncle in California, a notebook, and some food coupons. Both brothers were extremely malnourished, and an autopsy showed that their stomachs were empty besides traces of lotus seeds. The body of Wang Zongfang, who stood 165 cm, only weighed between 70 or 80 jin (35–40 kg). A full verification of their identities was conducted, with Wang Zongfang being confirmed through his fingerprints matching those in his criminal file and Wang Zongwei being confirmed through several dental crowns on his upper teeth. News of the Wang brothers' death was relayed to MPS and broadcast on public radio the same day, while pictures of their naked emaciated corpses appeared in newspapers over the following days. Observers noted that the crime spree, having started near Chinese New Year, somewhat fittingly ended on the verge of Mid-Autumn Festival.

== Victims ==
There were 18 casualties, most commonly cited as nine fatalities and nine seriously injuries. As Chinese authorities would not immediately confirm the status of victims after the Shenyang hospital shooting, the total casualties were sometimes misreported as being all fatalities. Wang Zongwei killed nine of the victims and was responsible for the majority of injuries. Wang Zongfang reportedly did not know how to use a gun when the crime spree began and had bad aim, which contributed to him only killing and injuring one each. Three of the wounded are not usually included, as two of the injured in Hengyang received only superficial damage from grazes to the ear and the hospital intern in Wuhan was only beaten rather than shot. The police casualties of the final shootout are generally not counted as they did not occur during the crime spree, though other sources thus list ten dead and eleven injured.

=== Shenyang ===
==== Killed ====
- Zhou Huamin (周化民), (Note: Sometimes misspelled as Zhou Shimin (周仕民/周士民)) deputy director of the No. 463 Hospital's political department
- Liu Fushan (刘福山), military instructor
- Sun Weijin (孙维金), physician
- Bi Jibing (毕继兵), 24, recruit and supply driver

==== Injured ====
- Wu Yongchun (吴永春), 30s, soldier and supply assistant
- Lu Wencheng (卢文成), medical assistant
- Li Zuozhou (李作舟), worker

=== Hengyang ===
==== Killed ====
- Zhang Yeliang (张业良), factory worker

==== Injured ====
- Unidentified police officer
- Jiang Guangxu (蒋光煦), security guard
- Zhang Xiaoqin (张筱琴), 15, student
- Li Ruiling (李瑞玲), factory worker
- Liu Chongyang (刘重阳), factory worker

=== Wuhan ===
==== Killed ====
- Wang Yun (王云), 50s, police officer
- Li Xinyan (李信岩), 25, police officer
- Chen Zhenjian (陈震尖), worker
- Zhan Xiaojian (詹小建), factory worker

==== Injured ====
- Zhou Jianyuan (周建媛), medical intern
- Xiong Jiguo (熊继国), militiaman

=== Guangchang County ===
==== Killed ====
- Wu Zengxing (吴增兴), 30, police officer

==== Injured ====
- Gan Xiangqing (甘象清), police officer

== Aftermath ==
The encirclement and search for the Wang brothers were the first major combat operations undertaken by the newly reorganized People's Armed Police. The members of the combined search team responsible for tracking and shooting down the Wang brothers received first-class merit awards and were honoured by the Ministry of Public Security with the title "Resourceful, courageous, united in battle". The Jiangxi Provincial Armed Police Corps honoured its members Wu Zengxing and Gan Xiangqing, who were killed and wounded respectively, and have since displayed the bloodied shirts worn by the officers during the engagement at the honour hall of the First Company of the Second Detachment. Wu Zengxing was additionally given the posthumous title of "Good leading staff officer". Wu's death site is regularly visited by his detachment and family, while the Guangchang County People’s Hospital is also visited by the corps to thank its staff, particularly head surgeon Hu Youxiang, for saving Gan Xiangqing's life.

The parents of the Wang brothers turned themselves in to police the same day as the Shenyang hospital shooting after hearing about their sons' actions several hours after they left the home. They were questioned for three days before being allowed back home. The father, Wang Jialin, was arrested the same montha and sentenced to seven years of hard labour for providing aid to his sons. When he was informed of the death of his sons, he reportedly said "Good, the punishment fits the crimes" ("好，罪有应得"). He was released one year early in 1989, telling reporters that although he believed himself to be innocent, he credited the exercise in prison for making him healthier than when he was a teacher. On 21 September 2007, at the age of 81, he and his wife were interviewed by Sanlian Lifeweek reporter Ge Weiying. Wang Jialin still condemned his two sons, but also dispelled rumours and other misinformation about the crime spree. A popular claim stated that when Wang Jialin asked his sons where they were going to flee after the hospital shooting, Wang Zongfang responded "East, West, South, North, and Center" ("东西南北中"), which Wang Jialin said was invented by a journalist he never met. Of the reports he read describing the "Er Wang" case, Wang Jialin and Wang Chunfang only agreed with one, which he described as "really well-written" for placing the crime in a greater historical context.

=== Media coverage ===
During the manhunt and in the years after, several rumours circulated about the Wang brothers, resulting in often exaggerated variations in the backgrounds of the perpetrators and how the crimes occurred. Their image as bandits also led to the false perception that Wang Zongwei was a special forces soldier or rifle tester who always hit a target, made use of grenades (which they actually lost within three days of their crime spree), had access to automatic weaponry (they only made use of handguns), and that they killed over 20 victims in indiscriminate fashion. In summer 1984, Li Honglin published a rough overview of the Er Wang case in the Beijing Evening News to counter the false notion that the Wang brothers were "folk heroes who outwitted police [,] committed crimes because they were poor [and] only killed officials but did not harm the people".

The manhunt for the Wang brothers was dramatised in an illustrated booklet, focusing on the heroic actions of police, military, and victims, entitled "Chasing the Two Wangs".

Some reports in English sources mix up the Shenyang and Wuhan shooting into one event, claiming that the shooting happened after their arrest at the hospital while at a local jail, where Wang Zongwei "wipe[d] out an entire police station with a few well-aimed shots". In addition to the reprinting of existing misinformation, it was falsely reported that the brothers also robbed banks and engaged in rape, which were crimes committed by other offenders targeted during the Strike Hard Against Crime Campaign.

American newspapers commonly compared the infamy of the Wang brothers to that of outlaw brothers Frank James and Jesse James. Asiaweek described them as similar in notoriety as female Indian bandit leader Phoolan Devi.

=== Judicial ===
Liu Wen, the overseeing authority in the Er Wang case, stated that he was dismayed that the Wang brothers were not captured sooner, allowing them to kill more people. Even after the brothers were killed, Liu Wen was critical of the police investigation and overall response, stating "It took seven months to resolve the case, lessons should be learned! What heroism is there to speak of?" ("7个月才破案，应该吸取教训！有什么英雄可言？"). Liu had been the one to suggest the return of wanted posters to superiors after studying those used in British Hong Kong, the Republican Era, and the Qing Dynasty. He originally proposed a 5,000 yuan bounty, arguing "Great rewards bring out brave men. This should not be the exclusive domain of feudalism or capitalism." ("重赏之下必有勇夫，这不该是封建主义、资本主义的专利"). He disapproved of the decision to reduce the amount to 2,000 yuan and supported that modern rewards for clues in criminal investigations were now around 500,000 yuan.

The MPS suspects that the Wang brothers committed several more non-murder offences, both before the Shenyang hospital shooting and during the manhunt. Xie Zhusheng, the handler of Wei Nan, stated that he felt pity for the death of the Wang brothers since it meant that many more crimes would now be left unsolved without their testimony.

The CIA's monitoring service FBIS suggested that the strong measures taken by the government were meant to prevent copycat crime and set the population at ease, since the Wang brothers were now considered the highpoint in the national rise of crimes since the 1970s. Since 1980, party leaders had already been debating whether to hasten the judicial process and impose capital punishment more frequently as a countermeasure to the crime wave, with concerns of either prosecuting innocents or continuing the existing state where "criminals had no fear of the law and people feared the criminals". It was ultimately decided to allow for changes to the Criminal Procedure Law of the People's Republic of China in favour of a stronger approach against crime in a prelude to the organized Strike Hard Against Crime Campaign, including suspension of article 110, regulating time limits for court notices and summons, and a change to article 131 to reduce the timeframe for appeal from ten to three days. Within a span of six weeks, between July and September 1983, ten thousands were arrested, of whom hundreds were executed, with quicker trials and verdicts for cases with "solid evidence" and unrepentant defendants, on charges of murder, rape, robbery, and bombing. The Chicago Tribune wrote that by December 1983, the death penalty also applied in some cases of assault, smuggling, illegal gambling, and public drunkenness.

Although the anti-spiritual pollution campaign contributed as a whole to the improvement of communications between different agencies, the government prioritised the installation of fax machines for easier distribution of wanted posters. The case also led to more traffic checks, more advanced tactics for special law enforcement, and is credited with being one the reasons for the introduction of the 110 emergency hotline in 1986.

== See also ==
- List of serial killers in China
- List of serial killers by number of victims
