= 湖南 (disambiguation) =

湖南 may refer to:

- Hunan (湖南省), a province in China.
- Hunan Township (湖南乡), a township in Linchuan District, Fuzhou, Jiangxi, China.
- Hunan, Fujian (湖南镇), a town in Fuzhou, Fujian.
- Hunan, Zhejiang (湖南镇), a town in Quzhou, Zhejiang
- Honam (Korean: 호남 지방, Hanja: 湖南地方), in South Korea
- Konan, Shiga (湖南市), a city in Japan.

== See also ==
- Hunan (disambiguation), Chinese romanization of "湖南"
- Konan (disambiguation), Japanese romanization of "湖南"
