= Hunan (disambiguation) =

Hunan is a province of China.

Hunan may also refer to these places in China:

- Hunan Subdistrict, a subdistrict of Tiedong District, Anshan, Liaoning
- Hunan Township, a township in Fuzhou, Jiangsu
- Hunan, Fujian, a town in Fuzhou, Fujian
- Hunan, Zhejiang, a town in Quzhou, Zhejiang

== See also ==
- Henan (disambiguation)
- Hunanese (disambiguation)
- Hunan cuisine
- Honam (in South Korea)
