= Ganzhu =

Ganzhu 甘竹镇
- Town
- Location in China Ganzhu (China)
- Coordinates: 26°56′54″N 116°22′17″E
- Country: China
- Province: Jiangxi
- Prefecture-level city: Fuzhou
- County: Guangchang County

Area
  - Total: 114 km^{2} (44 sq mi)

Population (2019)
  - Total: 24,236

Economic sectors of employment
  - Primary: 21,536
  - Other or unemployed: 2,700

Ethnicity
  - Han: 100%
- Postal code: 344901
- Area code: 0794

Ganzhu (Chinese: 甘竹; pinyin: Gānzhú; lit. 'Sugarcane bamboo') is an industry-based town lying on the Fu River in northern Guangchang County, Fuzhou, Jiangxi, China. During the Song dynasty, it was called Lumaozhou (蘆毛洲). Ganzhu is adjacent in the east to Qianshan Township, in the south to Xujiang (a town), a recreation farm to its west and Nanfeng County to the north, which it borders. Ganzhuwei (甘竹圩), its town government, resides 13 kilometres away from the county seat. Also nicknamed the "first town of Xuyuan" (盱源首镇), Ganzhu has at least 20 attractions, one of which is the world's largest lotus field. The town consists of 4,761 households and as of 2020 governs one residential community and the following 12 villages:

- Ganzhu Village
- Luojia Village (罗家村)
- Elong Village (鹅龙村)
- Zhuxi Village (洙溪村)
- Pingshang Village (坪上村)
- Longxi Village (龙溪村)
- Chaohua Village (朝华村)
- Datian Village (答田村)
- Dasheng Village (大嵊村)
- Zhangshu Village (樟树村)
- Tushi Village (图石村)
- Dongyuan Village (东源村)
