= Henan (disambiguation) =

Henan is a province of China.

Henan may also refer to:

- Henan F.C., a professional football club in Zhengzhou, Henan, China
- Henån, town in Sweden
- 2085 Henan, main-belt asteroid
- Henan (footballer) (born 1987), Henan Faria da Silveira, Brazilian footballer

== Places in China ==
- Henan Mongol Autonomous County, a county in eastern Qinghai

=== Townships ===
- Henan Township, Heilongjiang, in Keshan County, Heilongjiang
- Henan Township, Sichuan, in Hanyuan County, Sichuan

=== Subdistricts ===
- Henan Subdistrict, Gongzhuling, in Gongzhuling, Jilin
- Henan Subdistrict, Hunchun, in Hunchun, Jilin
- Henan Subdistrict, Jiaohe, in Jiaohe, Jilin
- Henan Subdistrict, Panshi, in Panshi, Jilin
- Henan Subdistrict, Yanji, in Yanji, Jilin

=== Former places ===
- Henan Commandery, historical commandery centred on modern Luoyang
- Henan Prefecture, historical prefecture centred on modern Luoyang
  - Luoyang, the seat of Henan Commandery (later Prefecture) and Henan County
- Henan Jiangbei province, in the Yuan dynasty
- Haizhu District, commonly referred to as "Henan District", referring to its location south of the Pearl River in Guangzhou, China

== See also ==
- Hunan (disambiguation)
