= Sangtian =

Sangtian 桑田镇
- Town
- Location in Jiangxi Sangtian (China)
- Coordinates: 27°07′32″N 116°34′01″E
- Country: People's Republic of China
- Province: Jiangxi
- Prefecture-level city: Fuzhou
- County: Nanfeng County
- Time zone: UTC+8 (China Standard)

Sangtian (simplified Chinese: 桑田镇; traditional Chinese: 桑田鎮; pinyin: Sāngtián Zhèn) is a town-level administrative unit under the jurisdiction of Nanfeng County, Fuzhou City, Jiangxi Province, People's Republic of China. As of 2017, it has 11 villages under its administration.

== Administrative Divisions ==
Sangtian has jurisdiction over the following areas:

Xiaofang Village, Gucheng Village, Zhushanxia Village, Genzhu Village, Hetiangang Village, Sangtian Village, Xinyi Shangcun, Zengjiafeng Village, Yukeng Village, Shuikou Village and Xiyuan Village.
