= Dasheng =

Dasheng may refer to:

== Places in China ==
- Dasheng Town (大盛镇), Yubei District, Chongqing Municipality
- Dasheng Town (大盛镇, Dong'an County, Yong'an City, Hunan Province
- Dasheng Town (大盛镇, Anqiu County, Weifang City, Shandong Province
- Dasheng Village (大胜村), Xuefeng Subdistrict, Dongkou County, Shaoyang City, Hunan Province
- Dasheng Village (大嵊村), Ganzhu Town, Guangchang County, Fuzhou City, Jiangxi Province

== People ==
- Emperor Dasheng (大聖皇帝), formerly used as a posthumous name of Helibo (1039–1092)
- Zheng Dasheng (born 1968), Chinese film director nominated for the Golden Rooster Award for Best Director on multiple occasions
