= Qincheng, Nanfeng County =

Town in Jiangxi, China

Qincheng 琴城镇
- Town
- Location in Jiangxi Qincheng (China)
- Coordinates: 27°12′17″N 116°31′55″E
- Country: China
- Province: Jiangxi
- Prefecture-level city: Fuzhou
- County: Nanfeng County
- Time zone: UTC+8 (China Standard)

Qincheng (simplified Chinese: 琴城镇; traditional Chinese: 琴城鎮; pinyin: Qínchéng Zhèn) is a town-level administrative unit under the jurisdiction of Nanfeng County, Fuzhou city, Jiangxi province, China. As of 2017, it had 7 residential communities and 14 villages under its administration.

== Administrative divisions ==
Qincheng administers the following villages and communities:

Communities

- Renmin
- Jiefang
- Jianshe
- Xinjian
- Cangshan
- Orange
- East Orange

Villages

- West Dabao
- Xiafang
- Shuibei
- Qiaobei
- Xujiabian
- Maodian
- Fuxi
- Youjun
- Aiyuan
- Yaopu
- Shuinan
- Yangmei
- Orchard Village
- Chaoxian
