= 2011 Fuzhou, Jiangxi, bombings =

Series of car bombings in China

2011 Fuzhou bombings
- Location: Fuzhou, Jiangxi, China
- Date: 26 May 2011; 9:00 am (UTC+8)
- Attack type: Car bombings, bombing
- Deaths: 3 (including the perpetrator)
- Injuries: 7
- Perpetrators: Qian Mingqi (Chinese: 钱明奇; pinyin: Qián Míngqí)

The 2011 Fuzhou bombings (simplified Chinese: 抚州市连环爆炸案; traditional Chinese: 撫州市連環爆炸案; pinyin: Fǔzhōu shì liánhuán bàozhà àn) were three separate, synchronized explosions at government buildings in Fuzhou, Jiangxi, China on the morning of 26 May 2011. At least three people died, and at least seven were injured. The perpetrator, 52-year-old Qian Mingqi, was among those killed in the blasts, leading China's state-run news agencies to label it a suicide bombing.

The three explosions occurred between 9:18 and 9:45am CST (0100 UTC). The first blast occurred in a parking lot outside the offices of the city prosecutor, the second inside a district administration office, and the third explosion hit the city's food and drug agency. Two of the bombs were placed inside cars parked just outside the buildings. The official Xinhua News Agency had posted a news article on its website saying the bombs were planted by a disgruntled farmer who was dissatisfied with the outcome of a court case, but by 1pm on the day of the bombing the article had been removed from the site.

== Background ==
In 1995 Qian Mingqi's home was demolished by government authorities to make way for a highway. He then saved up enough money to build a second home, which was also shattered by a second forced demolition. His second house cost about 500,000 yuan, and the authorities paid him only half of that for compensation. Because of the lack of compensation, he posted slogans to resist the demolition. According to his neighbors, Qian's wife was then hung upside down by the demolition team. She died a few years later from gall bladder disease. From the police report of the Fuzhou Police, Qian's wife has been dead for several years.

After the ordeal he then discovered the land seized from him to make a highway was actually not used. By 2002, Qian began petitioning in Fuzhou and Beijing's government offices. Unable to find redress, he reportedly taught himself to use the internet and cultivated a presence on various blogging platforms, hoping to get the attention of human rights defenders, academics, lawyers, reporters, and police. Not only did Qian fail to elicit the attention of anyone who might help him, but he became aware of other individuals who had similarly had their homes demolished. On one of his blogs, he accused the Linchuan district party cadres of embezzling 10 million yuan in compensation funds after demolishing his house and that of seven other families. Qian had two sons and one daughter.

Bombings, especially ones of this sophistication, are rare in China, but this was the second in a month. Earlier in May 2011 in north-west Gansu province a "petrol bomb" was set off outside a bank by a former employee. There are very few ways for the Chinese people to redress or raise awareness of what they see as a wrong they have suffered, and therefore, as the BBC's Michael Bristow states, "some Chinese people occasionally take out their frustration in attacks like this."

== Incident ==
According to Mingqi's Sina Weibo site and the 2002 demolitions, Qian was fed up. The weibo posts state "Ten years of seeking redress resulted in nothing," and "I was forced to step onto a road I didn't want to step on due to the loss of my newly built house, which was illegally demolished...my total loss was near to RMB two million Yuan." who wrote on Sina.com's weibo (microblogging) service, Sina Weibo, that his home had been demolished illegally. He wrote the last statement in his weibo: "I want to learn from Dong Cunrui [a People's Liberation Army soldier who carried an explosive package and blew up a bunker in 1948] and I hope I can receive the public's support and attention."

The bombs were detonated by Qian Mingqi, aged 52 at the time, who was killed in the explosions. Two victims are security guards of the Linchuan district government building, Xu Yingfu and He Haigen.

Time magazine reported:

"The first bomb, in a vehicle parked inside the gate of the local prosecutor's office, went off at about 9:15 a.m., according to local media reports. A second bomb detonated at 9:30 a.m. at a district government office, and a third bomb, believed to be a car bomb like the first, went off at 9:45 a.m. outside a local office of the State Food and Drug Administration."

The explosion blew most of the windows out of the local prosecutor's office, an eight-story building, and at least ten cars were destroyed.

== Censorship ==
Local journalists in Fuzhou stated that the Chinese police confiscated record-taking materials and deleted photographs from cameras. An early report posted on the official Xinhua News site was later removed from the website. Officials from the city were supposed to hold a news conference about the bombings, but it was canceled at the last minute, leading to further accusations of censorship.

== Response ==
Many Chinese bloggers, Weibo and Twitter users expressed sympathy for Qian Mingqi, with some calling him a "hero," and comparing him to Yang Jia, who killed Shanghai policemen after allegedly suffering mistreatment. Following the bombings, Qian's weibo page had attracted some 30,000 followers, before being shut down by Sina administrators. The Christian Science Monitor reported that most of the online commentators regarded Qian's actions not as a terrorist attack, but as "righteous vengeance:" "The flood of supportive comments online since his death is a sign of widespread public frustration at the government's disdain for ordinary citizens." VOA reported on 27 May that the death of Qian has sounded an alarm bell for Chinese government, and one blogger has said on his Twitter account:"...history will always remember Qian."

In an interview, Li Chengpeng, one of China's most popular and influential bloggers, said "Qian was no Bin Laden, he was one of the weak, he had no way to express himself nor defend his rights."

The Associated Press explained the outpouring of sympathy for Qian by observing that many citizens could relate to his tale of victimization at the hands of authorities, and to his frustration at the lack of channels to seek redress. The Associated Press observed that "Qian's grievances resonate widely in China, where land disputes have mushroomed amid a fast-paced economic boom. Standoffs between tenants and developers often turn violent, with homeowners beaten by thugs or even crushed by bulldozers. Other tenants have set themselves on fire rather than face eviction."

== See also ==
- 2010 Austin plane crash
- Social issues in the People's Republic of China
- Suicide in the People's Republic of China
- Socialist Harmonious Society
- Terrorism in the People's Republic of China
- Deng Yujiao incident
- Weiquan movement
