= Houxijie railway station =

Railway station in Zhejiang, China

Houxijie railway station 后溪街站
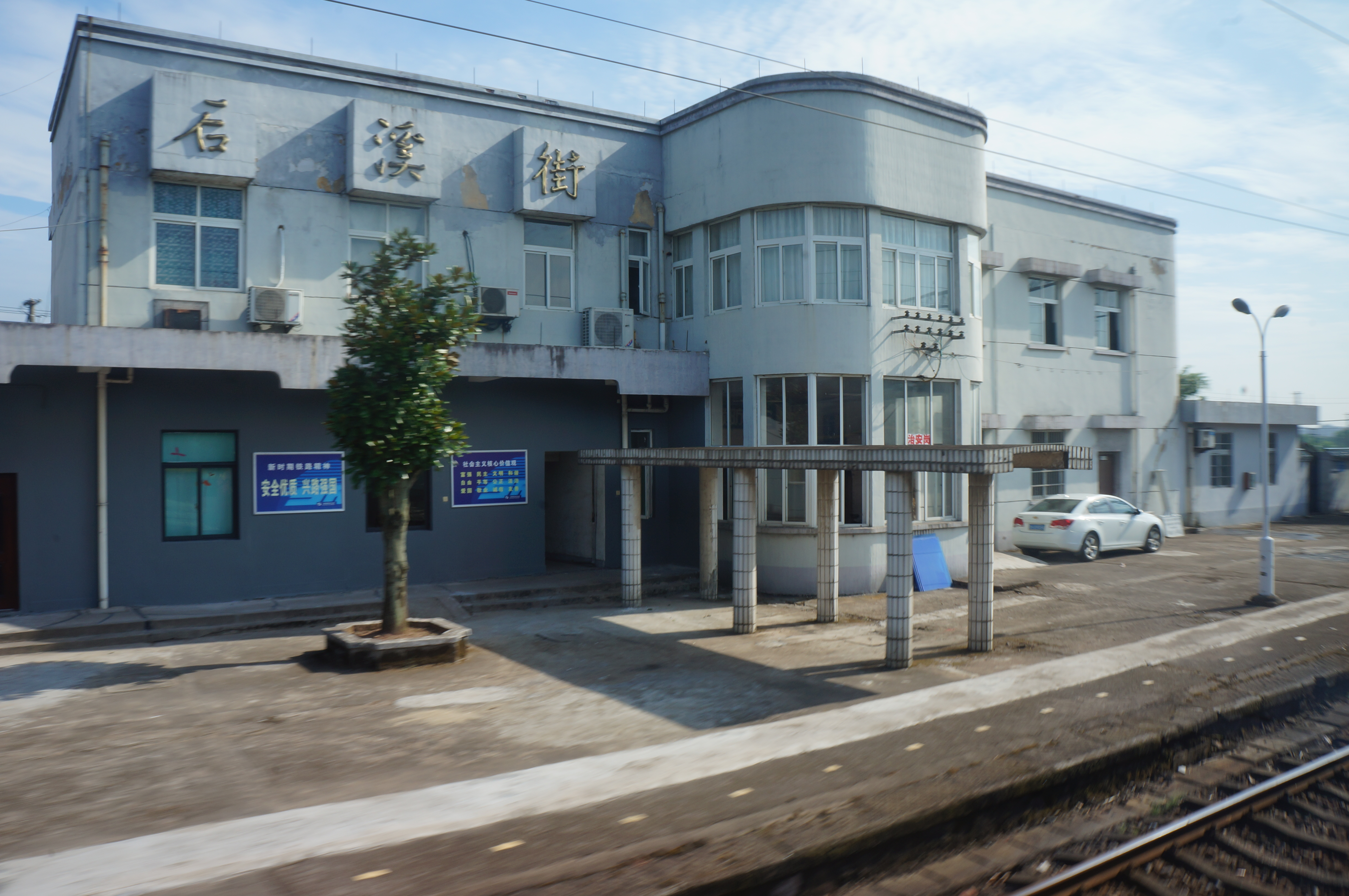
- The station building in 2017

General information
- Location: Houzi Town, Qujiang, Quzhou, Zhejiang; China
- Coordinates: 28°50′04″N 118°44′54″E
- Operator: CR Shanghai
- Line: Shanghai–Kunming railway

Other information
- Station code: HXH (Telegraph); HXJ (Pinyin); 32639 (Station)

History
- Opened: 1932

Services
Preceding station	China Railway	Following station
Quzhou towards Shanghai or Shanghai South	Shanghai–Kunming railway	Jiangshan towards Kunming
Location

Houxijie railway station (Chinese: 后溪街站) is a railway station in Houzi Town, Qujiang, Quzhou, Zhejiang, China, operated by CR Shanghai. It opened its services in 1932.

The station handled passenger services on the Shanghai–Kunming railway line until 1997, after which it only handled freight services. A dedicated line was built in 1966. In 2014, a collision at the station resulted in two deaths.
