= Taihe, Nanfeng County =

Taihe 太和镇
- Town
- Location in Jiangxi Taihe (China)
- Coordinates: 27°3′6″N 116°36′47″E
- Country: People's Republic of China
- Province: Jiangxi
- Prefecture-level city: Fuzhou
- County: Nanfeng County
- Time zone: UTC+8 (China Standard)

Taihe (Chinese: 太和; pinyin: Tàihé) is a town under the administration of Nanfeng County, Jiangxi, China. As of 2020, it has one residential community and 10 villages under its administration.

== Administrative divisions ==
Taihe administers the following villages and communities:

Communities

- Taihe Community

Villages

- Taihe Village
- Dianqian Village (店前村)
- Xiayang Village (下洋村)
- Danyang Village (丹阳村)
- Kangdu Village (康都村)
- Zhangfang Village (樟坊村)
- Xiatong Village (下桐村)
- Siqian Village (司前村)
- Hangshan Village (杭山村)
- Qianfang Village (前坊村)
