= Shishan, Nanfeng County =

Shishan 市山镇
- Town
- Location in Jiangxi Shishan (China)
- Coordinates: 27°12′50″N 116°29′51″E
- Country: People's Republic of China
- Province: Jiangxi
- Prefecture-level city: Fuzhou
- County: Nanfeng County
- Time zone: UTC+8 (China Standard)

Shishan (simplified Chinese: 市山镇; traditional Chinese: 市山鎮; pinyin: Shíshān Zhèn) is a town-level administrative unit under the jurisdiction of Nanfeng County, Fuzhou City, Jiangxi Province, People's Republic of China. As of 2017, it has 24 villages under its administration.

== Administrative Divisions ==
Shishan has jurisdiction over the following areas:

Shanshan Village, Xicun Village, Meixi Village, Kaokeng Village, Guanzhuang Village, Guantang Village, Pingyu Village, Guanchao Village, Zhuyuan Village, Dantan Village, Yaoli Village, Shiqian Village, Qianshan Village, Luoxi Village, Yihe Village, Cuiyun Village, Baofang Village, Shagang Village, Taotian Village, Hukeng Village, Jinxian Village, Chifang Village, Xinjian Village and Xiongfang Village.
