= Baishe, Jiangxi =

Baishe 白舍镇
- Town
- Location in Jiangxi Baishe (China)
- Coordinates: 27°02′34″N 116°26′19″E
- Country: People's Republic of China
- Province: Jiangxi
- Prefecture-level city: Fuzhou
- County: Nanfeng County
- Time zone: UTC+8 (China Standard)

Baishe (simplified Chinese: 白舍镇; traditional Chinese: 白舍鎮; pinyin: Báishě Zhèn) is a town-level administrative unit under the jurisdiction of Nanfeng County, Fuzhou City, Jiangxi Province, People's Republic of China. As of 2020, it has one residential community and 32 villages under its administration:

Community

- Baishe Community

Villages

- Baishe Village
- Fengjiang Village (丰江村)
- Hantou Village (晗头村)
- Chating Village (茶亭村)
- Wangtian Village (望天村)
- Sankeng Village (三坑村)
- Xiapi Village (下陂村)
- Yaopi Village (瑶陂村)
- Zhangjia Village (张家村)
- Chidu Village (池渡村)
- Xiagan Village (下甘村)
- Shanggan Village (上甘村)
- Chenfang Village (陈坊村)
- Tiandong Village (田东村)
- Fangkeng Village (坊坑村)
- Poyang Village (鄱阳村)
- Luofang Village (罗坊村)
- Luojia Village (罗家村)
- Xiaoshi Village (小石村)
- Jimin Village (际民村)
- Zhuhu Village (珠湖村)
- Jiangyuan Village (姜源村)
- Hedong Village (河东村)
- Zhouyuan Village (周源村)
- Shiyuan Village (石源村)
- Guzhu Village (古竹村)
- Zoufang Village (邹坊村)
- Zhonghe Village (中和村)
- Qiaokou Village (桥口村)
- Yanglin Village (杨林村)
- Qixia Village (磜下村)
- Qiaotou Village (桥头村)
