= G7013 Shaxian–Nanping Expressway =

Road in China

Shaxian–Nanping Expressway
- 沙县－南平高速公路
- Shanan Expressway 沙南高速公路

Route information
- Auxiliary route of G70

Major junctions
- North end: G3 in Jianyang District, Nanping, Fujian
- South end: G70 in Shaxian District, Sanming, Fujian

Location
- Country: China

Highway system
- National Trunk Highway System; Primary; Auxiliary; National Highways; Transport in China
← G7012	→ G7021

The G7013 Shaxian–Nanping Expressway (Chinese: 沙县—南平高速公路), also referred to as the Shanan Expressway (Chinese: 沙南高速公路), is an under construction expressway in Fujian, China that connects Shaxian to Nanping via Shunchang County. The expressway was originally numbered as Fujian Provincial Expressway S20 during the planning stage.
