= G7021 Ningde–Wuhan Expressway =

Road in China

Ningde–Wuhan Expressway
- 宁德－武汉高速公路
- Ningwu Expressway 宁武高速公路

Route information
- Auxiliary route of G70

Major junctions
- West end: G50 / G4201 in Jiangxia, Wuhan, Hubei
- East end: G1523 in Jiaocheng, Ningde, Fujian

Location
- Country: China

Highway system
- National Trunk Highway System; Primary; Auxiliary; National Highways; Transport in China
← G7013	→ G72

The G7021 Ningde–Wuhan Expressway (Chinese: 宁德—武汉高速公路), also referred to as the Ningwu Expressway (Chinese: 宁武高速公路), is an under construction expressway in China that connects the cities of Ningde, Fujian and Wuhan, Hubei.

== Route ==
Map of the Ningwu Expressway in Hubei

The expressway starts in Ningde and passes through Shunchang, Shaowu, Fuzhou, Zhangshu, Wuning and Yangxin, before terminating in Wuhan. The route travels through the provinces of Fujian, Hubei and Jiangxi.
