= Shenyang No. 1 Detention Center =

Detention facility in Shenyang, China

- Location in Shenyang, Liaoning Shenyang No. 1 Detention Center (China)
- Location: Gaoli Village, Zao Hua Town, Yuhong District, Shenyang, Liaoning, China; 41.878611°N 123.328972°E
- Status: Operational
- Population: Approximately 1,000 (2013)
- Opened: January 1999
- Managed by: Liaoning Prison Administration Bureau

Shenyang No. 1 Detention Center (Chinese: 沈阳市第一看守所) is a detention facility located at 3 Yuxin Road, Gaoli Village, Zao Hua Town, Yuhong District, Shenyang, Liaoning Province, China. It is adjacent to the Zaohua Prison.

== History ==
The facility was originally established in January 1999 in Wangshi Village, Hunnan New District, Shenyang. In August 2005, it was relocated to its current address.

== Notable detainees ==
- Li Yuhan (Chinese: 李昱函) – Human rights lawyer detained as part of the 709 crackdown who was reportedly subjected to mistreatment during pre-trial detention.
- Jiang Lijun(Chinese: 姜立军) – Rights activist
- Liu Hua (Chinese: 刘华 )– Rights activist; sentenced due to ties to Falun Gong
- Wang Zhan(Chinese: 王展) – Manchurian independence advocate arrested for inciting subversion of state power
- Xia Junfeng(Chinese: 夏俊峰) – Street vendor executed in 2013 after killing two urban management officers during an alleged self-defense incident.

== See also ==
- List of prisons in Liaoning
