= Hunanese =

Hunanese may refer to:

- Xiang Chinese or Hunanese, a branch of the Chinese language, spoken in Hunan, China
- Hunanese people, people born or native in Hunan, China
- Hunan cuisine, one of the eight culinary traditions of Chinese cuisine, comes from Hunan, China

== See also ==
- Hunan (disambiguation)
