= Hunan Township =

Hunan Township 湖南乡
- Township
- Location in Jiangxi Hunan Township (China)
- Coordinates: 27.9993°N 116.3857°E
- Country: People's Republic of China
- Province: Jiangxi
- Prefecture-level city: Fuzhou
- District: Linchuan District
- Time zone: UTC+8 (China Standard)

Hunan Township (simplified Chinese: 湖南乡; traditional Chinese: 湖南鄉; pinyin: Húnán Xiāng) is a township under the administration of Linchuan District in Fuzhou, Jiangxi, China. As of 2018, it has one residential community and 19 villages under its administration.
