= List of prisons in Liaoning =

This is a list of prisons within Liaoning province of the People's Republic of China.

== Liaoning ==
=== Shenyang ===
Prisons
Name	Enterprise name	City/County/District	Village/Town	Established	Notes
Dongling Prison		Shenyang			Approximately 1,000 prisoners in 2000
Kangjiashan Prison		Sujiatun District, Shenyang	Baiqing		
Kangping Prison	Kangping Prison Composite Factory	Kangping County, Shenyang			In Beisanjiazi or Baisanjiazi
Zaohua Prison	Shenyang Zaohua Prison Enterprises Corp.	Yuhong District, Shenyang	Zaohua	1951	About 1,000 inmates, annually 30% of inmates receive commuted sentences
Shenyang Women's Prison	Shenyang Wanzhong Sanwei Service Co. Ltd. (formerly Shenyang Grease Chemical Plant)	Shenyang		1940	About 3,000 inmates, Shenyang Wanzhong Sanwei Service Co. Ltd. was est. by the Shenyang Wanzhong Group and the Shenyang Grease Chemical Plant. Produces Wanzhong Sanwei brand detergent.
Liaoning Provincial Women's Prison	Shenyang Yisheng Health Products Development Co.	Shenyang	Masanjiazi	1956	Formerly Dabei Women's Prison.
Shenyang No. 1 Prison	Shenyang Waterproofing Co.; Zhongji New Materials Ltd Heat Preserving Pipes Plant	Yuhong District, Shenyang	Masanjiazi		
Shenyang No. 2 Prison	Shenyang General Recycled Rubber Plant	Shenyang	Dadong District and Yuhong District		
Shenyang No. 3 Prison	Shenyang Xinsheng Perfume Factory; Waterproof Materials	Shenyang			Merged with other prisons
Shenyang No. 5 Prison	Shenyang Dongbei Additives General Plant	Shenyang		1952	Had approximately 1,700 merged into another prison

Detention centers
Name	Enterprise name	City/County/District	Village/Town	Established	Notes
Liaoning Detention Center		Shenbei, Shenyang			
Shenyang No. 1 Detention Center		Yuhong District, Shenyang			
Shenyang No. 2 Detention Center		Hunnan District, Shenyang			
Heping Detention House		Shenyang			
Huanggu Detention Center		Shenyang			
Xinmin Detention Center		Shenyang			
Shenhe Detention Center		Shenyang			
Huanggu Detention House		Shenyang			
Shenbei Detention Center		Shenbei New Area			
Wafangdian Detention Center		Shenyang			
Tiexi Detention Center		Shenyang			
Liaozhong Detention Center		Shenyang			
Kangping Detention Center		Shenyang			
Liaoning Detention House		Shenyang			
Sujiatun Detention Center		Shenyang			
Dongling Detention Center		Shenyang			
Heping Detention Center		Shenyang			
Dadong Detention Center		Shenyang			
Tiexi Detention House		Shenyang			
Dadong Detention House		Shenyang			
Yuhong Detention Center		Shenyang			
Shenhe Detention House		Shenyang			

=== Anshan ===
Prisons
Name	Enterprise name	City/County/District	Village/Town	Established	Notes
Anshan City Prison	Anshan Prison Clothing Plant	Anshan		1985	In 2003/2004 numerous sentences were commuted

Detention centers
Name	Enterprise name	City/County/District	Village/Town	Established	Notes
Anshan No. 1 Detention Center		Tiedong District, Anshan			
Anshan Women's Detention Center		Anshan			
Anshan No. 2 Detention Center		Anshan			

Name	Enterprise name	City/County/District	Village/Town	Established	Notes
Baoshan Prison	Plastics Factory; Shuguang Carton Factory; Shuangyi Clothing Factory; Foundry; Yaqlujiang Paper Bag Factory	Dandong			
Dalian City Prison		Ganjingzi District, Dalian		1984	Holds or used to hold 2,000 inmates, numerous prisoners were paroled or had their sentence commuted. As of July 2004, it held 598 prisoners, including 18 Falun Gong prisoners
Dalian Nanguanling Prison	Dalian No. 3 Cement Plant	Ganzi, Dalian			Had merged with Nanguanling Prison. Has Jinbei registered trademark
Dalian Prison	Dalian Quartz & Diabase Products Plant	Shahekou District, Dalian		1953	
Dandong City Prison	Dandong Shuguang Trading Co. Ltd.; Dandong Suguang Construction and Engineering Co.				
Fushun Qingtaizi Prison		Wanghua District, Fushun		1951	Liaoning Prov. Fushun Machine Tool Manufacturers Ltd. (formerly Fushun Machine Works) Fuxin Carbon Ltd; Knit Sweaters Factory; Chemical Factory; Inter alia, produces BC6063 and B60100 shaping machines and J95F-6.3 and J95K-6.3 step-press machines. Products exported to Australia and over 40 countries in Asia and Europe. Since 2003 over 10 enterprises including Fuxin Carbon Ltd., Knit Sweaters Factory, Chemical Factory, Steel Residue Sieving, and Chuoliao Processing have successfully worked in collaboration. Products exported to Australia and over 40 countries in Asia and Europe.
Fuxin Sihe Prison (Fuxin City Prison)	Fuxin City No.1 Gangue Brickyard				
Gaoshanzi Prison	Beining City Chengxin Rubber Machinery Ltd.			1953	
Haicheng Juvenile Offender Detachment	Haicheng Agricultural Machine Works; Haicheng Juvenile Offenders' Department Labor Services Co.	Haicheng, Liaoning		1960	Formerly in Lingyuan, Liaoning
Huazi Prison	Xinsheng Cement Plant	Dengta	Huajia, Huazi		
Jinzhou Prison	Jinzhou Switch Factory; Jinzhou Jinkai Electrical Group	Jinzhou		1953	
Kangping Beisanjiazi Prison or Kangping Baisanjiazi Prison	Kangping Xinsheng Farm				Area of 73 km²
Liaonan New Inmates Prison		Wafangdian			
Liaoning Province Prison Enterprises Corporation	Liaoning Province Prison Enterprise Group				Jinzhou Electrical Switches, Lingyuan Hongling Automotive Components, and Panjin Dingxiang Agriculture Industry and Construction Group initially formed the enterprise group. Now includes Jinzhou Jinkai Electrical Group Ltd., Shenyang Xinsheng Power Plant, Liaoning Lingyuan Hongling Automotive Group, Dalian Wafangdian Machine Tools Ltd., Fushun Machine Tool Manufacturers Ltd., Taixing Industries Ltd., Liaoning Province Shen'an Construction Engineering Company, Shenyang Ningda Clothing, Shenyang Dongbei Xiangsu Materials Ltd., Shimen Silicon Quarry.
Lingyuan No. 1 Prison	Lingyuan Hongfa Bent Axle Manufacturing Ltd.; Linghe Auto Fuel Pump Factory	Dongcheng, Lingyuan, Liaoning		1965	Important supplier for Dalian Diesel Engine Plant No. 1 Auto Manufacturing Group and Dongfeng Chaoyang Diesel Engine Factory.
Lingyuan No. 2 Prison	Longma Group; Linghe Auto Factory	Lingyuan, Liaoning			In Bajianfang
Lingyuan No. 3 Prison	Hongyuan Corporation	Lingyuan, Liaoning			
Lingyuan No. 4 Prison	Linghe Automobile Fuel Pump Factory	Lingyuan, Liaoning	Wanyuandian		In Dazhuke, signed automobile refitting contracts with Changchun No. 1 Auto Factory, Ji’nan Heavy Vehicle Factory, and Shanqi and Hongyan Auto Factories.
Lingyuan No. 5 Prison	Linghe Auto Chassis Factory	Lingyuan, Liaoning	Bajianfang		
Lingyuan Prison Management Sub-bureau	Liaoning Lingyuan Hongling Auto Group Co. (formerly Linghe Auto Industry Co.);Liaoning Province Lingyuan Hongling Thermal Power Plant; Lingyuan Hongfa Co.				
Panjin Prison	Panjin Ding-Xiang Agriculture & Industry Group Corporation (Created by a merger of Panjin Xinsheng Farm and Panjin Xinsheng Machine Factory)	Xinglongtai District, Panjin		1952	About 6,000 inmates
Prov. Juvenile Offenders' Department		Haicheng, Liaoning	Nantai		1,000 inmates as of 2004, Jan.16, 2005 335 juveniles received reduced sentences of 1 month to 2 years, the largest number in recent years. Of the 141 who were paroled, the oldest was 23 years old, the youngest 15 old.
Shimen Prison	Liaoning Shimen Screening Plant	Liaoyang			
Tieling Prison		Tieling			In 2000 10 inmates died due to illness and 70 were released for medical treatment. In 2001 held 3,000 inmates, of which only 2 were released for medical treatment.
Wafangdian Prison	Dalian Wafangdian Machine Tools Ltd.			1949	As of May 2005, held 3,200 inmates
Xihu Prison	Benxi City Xihu Prison Industrial Company, Iron Factory, Metal Refining Plant	Benxi	Shanbao, Huolianzhai		
Yingkou Prison	Liaoning Yingkou Penghao Industrial Group	Yingkou			Area of 48.66 km²
Yong'an Prison	Jinzhou Xinsheng Transformer Co. Ltd. (Formerly Jinzhou Electric Furnace & Transformer Works)	Jinzhou			Result of a 2004 merger

== Sources ==
- Laogai Handbook 2007-2008 (PDF) (in Chinese and English). Washington, D.C.: Laogai Research Foundation. October 2008. pp. 315–344. ISBN 978-1-931550-25-3.
