= Guangchang County =

Coordinates: 26°45′58″N 116°21′05″E

Guangchang County 广昌县 Kwangchang
- County
- Location in Jiangxi
- Country: People's Republic of China
- Province: Jiangxi
- Prefecture-level city: Fuzhou

Area
  - Total: 1,612 km^{2} (622 sq mi)

Population (2018)
  - Total: 250,000
  - Density: 160/km^{2} (400/sq mi)
- Time zone: UTC+8 (China Standard)
- Postal code: 344900

Guangchang County (simplified Chinese: 广昌县; traditional Chinese: 廣昌縣; pinyin: Guǎngchāng Xiàn) lies in the municipal region of Fuzhou (抚州), Jiangxi. It is the southernmost and most remote of Fuzhou's ten counties, being bordered by counties in Ganzhou to the south and west and, to the east and over the watershed and provincial border, by Jianning and Ninghua Counties, Sanming, Fujian. It is the source of the second largest river in Jiangxi: Fuhe (抚河). This county built in the Southern Song dynasty Shaoxing eight years (1138, Shaoxing is an era name of Gaozong), because the rich white lotus, known as "the hometown of Chinese White Lotus." County has width of 45 km (28 mi) from west to east, 55 km (34 mi) long from north to south. The total area is 1,612 km^{2} (622 sq mi), with a population of 240,000 in 2003.

== Administration ==
In the present, Guangchang County has 5 towns and 6 townships.

=== 5 Towns (镇, zhen) ===
- Xujiang (盱江)
- Ganzhu (甘竹)
- Toupei (头陂)
- Chishui (赤水)
- Yiqian (驿前)

=== 6 Townships (乡, xiang) ===
- Qianshan (千善乡)
- Shuinanwei (水南圩乡)
- Changqiao (长桥乡)
- Yangxi (杨溪乡)
- Jianfeng (尖峰乡)
- Tangfang (塘坊乡)

== Climate ==
Climate data for Guangchang, elevation 166 m (545 ft), (1991–2020 normals, extremes 1981–present)
Month	Jan	Feb	Mar	Apr	May	Jun	Jul	Aug	Sep	Oct	Nov	Dec	Year
Record high °C (°F)	27.3 (81.1)	31.4 (88.5)	33.1 (91.6)	35.5 (95.9)	36.6 (97.9)	38.4 (101.1)	40.3 (104.5)	40.7 (105.3)	38.1 (100.6)	37.2 (99.0)	32.4 (90.3)	27.1 (80.8)	40.7 (105.3)
Mean daily maximum °C (°F)	11.6 (52.9)	14.7 (58.5)	18.1 (64.6)	24.4 (75.9)	28.5 (83.3)	31.1 (88.0)	34.4 (93.9)	33.9 (93.0)	30.7 (87.3)	26.0 (78.8)	20.3 (68.5)	14.3 (57.7)	24.0 (75.2)
Daily mean °C (°F)	7.1 (44.8)	9.7 (49.5)	13.2 (55.8)	19.1 (66.4)	23.4 (74.1)	26.4 (79.5)	28.9 (84.0)	28.3 (82.9)	25.4 (77.7)	20.3 (68.5)	14.6 (58.3)	8.8 (47.8)	18.8 (65.8)
Mean daily minimum °C (°F)	4.0 (39.2)	6.4 (43.5)	10.0 (50.0)	15.4 (59.7)	19.8 (67.6)	23.2 (73.8)	24.9 (76.8)	24.5 (76.1)	21.6 (70.9)	16.2 (61.2)	10.6 (51.1)	5.1 (41.2)	15.1 (59.3)
Record low °C (°F)	−6.0 (21.2)	−4.0 (24.8)	−2.6 (27.3)	3.3 (37.9)	8.9 (48.0)	14.5 (58.1)	19.7 (67.5)	18.2 (64.8)	12.7 (54.9)	3.6 (38.5)	−1.6 (29.1)	−9.3 (15.3)	−9.3 (15.3)
Average precipitation mm (inches)	80.8 (3.18)	101.9 (4.01)	217 (8.5)	214.8 (8.46)	275.5 (10.85)	330.9 (13.03)	146.6 (5.77)	143.8 (5.66)	71.7 (2.82)	56.2 (2.21)	88.4 (3.48)	61 (2.4)	1,788.6 (70.37)
Average precipitation days (≥ 0.1 mm)	12.2	13.2	19.1	17.2	17.8	17.1	11.3	13.2	8.2	6.3	8.7	9.3	153.6
Average snowy days	1.9	1.1	0.2	0	0	0	0	0	0	0	0	0.5	3.7
Average relative humidity (%)	82	81	84	82	82	83	76	79	79	77	79	78	80
Mean monthly sunshine hours	80.3	76.8	74.5	95.7	120.1	125.9	228.6	207.3	165.4	155.9	129.4	118.9	1,578.8
Percentage possible sunshine	24	24	20	25	29	31	54	52	45	44	40	37	35
Source: China Meteorological Administrationall-time May low
