= Henan Township, Sichuan =

Henan Township 河南乡
- Township
- Location in Sichuan
- Coordinates: 29°14′9″N 102°35′22″E
- Country: People's Republic of China
- Province: Sichuan
- Prefecture-level city: Ya'an
- County: Hanyuan County
- Time zone: UTC+8 (China Standard)

Henan Township (simplified Chinese: 河南乡; traditional Chinese: 河南鄉; pinyin: Hénán Xiāng) is a township under the administration of Hanyuan County in Sichuan, China. As of 2020, it has four villages under its administration:

- Henan Village
- Yanjing Village (盐井村)
- Pingdeng Village (平等村)
- Baishu Village (柏树村)
