= Qujiang, Quzhou =

Qujiang 衢江区
- District
- Wu's Ancestral Hall in Chetang, Yunxi Township

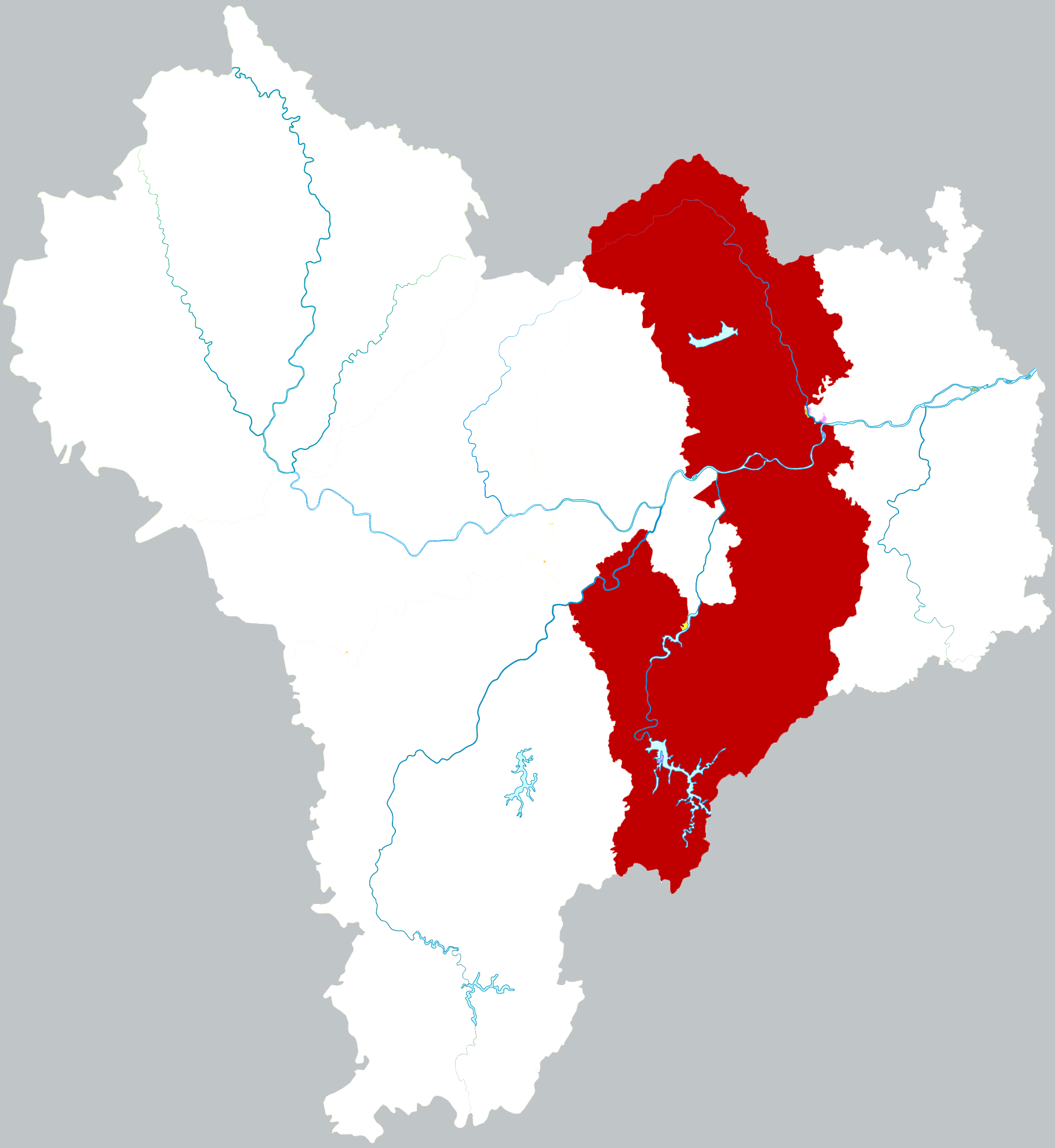
- Location of Qujiang District within Quzhou

- Location in Zhejiang
- Coordinates: 28°58′49″N 118°57′33″E
- Country: People's Republic of China
- Province: Zhejiang
- Prefecture-level city: Quzhou

Area
  - Total: 1,747.53 km^{2} (674.73 sq mi)

Population (2020)
  - Total: 373,920
  - Density: 213.97/km^{2} (554.18/sq mi)
- Time zone: UTC+8 (China Standard)

Qujiang District (Chinese: 衢江区; pinyin: Qújiāng), formerly Qu County (Chinese: 衢县), is a district of Quzhou City, Zhejiang, China.

== Geography ==
Qujiang ,Quzhou is located in the western part of Zhejiang Province, between 118°41′ and 119°06′ east longitude and 28°31′ and 29°20′ north latitude. The district has an area of 1,748 km², measuring 41 km from east to west and 87.9 km from south to north. It is bounded by Longyou County to the east, Suichang County to the south, Changshan County and Jiangshan City to the west, and Chun'an County and Jiande City to the north.

The district is located in the central part of the Jinqu Basin. The high mountains to the south and north slope towards the centre, forming a transitional landscape of medium and low mountains, hills and plains arranged in successive elevations. The terrain also forms a dustpan-shaped basin that opens from the southwest towards the northeast. The topography within the district consists of valley plains (22.6% of the total area), hills and elevated land (32.3%), and mountainous areas (45.1%). The highest point is Shuimen Peak in the south, at an elevation of 1,451.8 m, while the lowest point is Zhujia Village in Anren Town, east of the central plain, at an elevation of 45.2 m.

There are 100 soil species, 42 soil families and 11 subclasses, classified into five soil types: red loam, yellow loam, rocky soil, moist soil and paddy soil. From the banks of the Qujiang River towards the hilly areas, the soil types are distributed in the following sequence: moist soil, paddy soil, red loam, yellow loam and a mixture of red and yellow loam. Rocky soil is distributed throughout the region due to the influence of the underlying parent rock. Red loam and yellow loam account for the largest proportion, representing 73.24% of the total.

== Climate ==
Qujiang ,Quzhou has a subtropical monsoon climate, with four distinct seasons, moderate temperatures, abundant sunshine ,and a long frost-free period. Its climatic characteristics include an early spring, short autumn, long summer and winter, moderate temperatures, ample sunshine, and alternating periods of drought and waterlogging. The mean annual temperature is 17.3 °C, mean annual precipitation is 1,636 mm, and mean annual sunshine duration is 1,984.3 hours.

== Economy ==
In 2011, the total industrial output value of Qujiang Town was 6.541 million yuan, while industrial added value amounted to 981,000 yuan, accounting for 19% of the total industrial output value. The town had 12 industrial enterprises with 1,180 employees. Its main industrial products included timber, small fruits, and tea products.

In 2011, total retail sales of consumer goods in Qujiang Town reached 320,000 yuan, an increase of 3.8% over the previous year. The transaction volume of market trade reached 330,000 yuan, an increase of 1.7% over the previous year. The town had 131 commercial outlets with 150 employees.

At the end of 2011, Qujiang Town had one rural credit cooperative and one branch. Total deposits amounted to 310 million yuan, an increase of 12% over the previous year, while total loans amounted to 170 million yuan, an increase of 10%. In April 2020, B2B platforms and local authorities established a rural e-commerce livestreaming training centre in Quzhou to train local farmers in livestreaming and online product sales. The centre was the first of its kind established in the city and formed part of efforts to promote agricultural e-commerce and the online marketing of local products.

== Administrative divisions ==
Quzhoudong Railway Station, Zhangzhang Subdistrict

Subdistricts:

- Zhangzhang Subdistrict (樟潭街道), Fushi Subdistrict (浮石街道)

Towns:

- Shangfang (上方镇), Duze (杜泽镇), Nianli (廿里镇), Houxi (后溪镇), Dazhou (大洲镇), Hunan (湖南镇), Xiachuan (峡川镇), Lianhua (莲花镇), Quanwang (全旺镇), Gaojia (高家镇)

Townships:

- Taizhen Township (太真乡), Yunxi Township (云溪乡), Henglu Township (横路乡), Huiping Township (灰坪乡), Jucun Township (举村乡), Zhoujia Township (周家乡), Shuangqiao Township (双桥乡), Lingyang Township (岭洋乡), Huangtankou Township (黄坛口乡)
