= Chongren County =

Chongren County 崇仁县 Tsungjen
- County
- Location in Jiangxi
- Coordinates: 27°42′N 116°03′E
- Country: People's Republic of China
- Province: Jiangxi
- Prefecture-level city: Fuzhou

Area
  - Total: 1,520 km^{2} (590 sq mi)

Population (2019)
  - Total: 380,000
  - Density: 250/km^{2} (650/sq mi)
- Time zone: UTC+8 (China Standard)
- Postal Code: 344200

Chongren County (simplified Chinese: 崇仁县; traditional Chinese: 崇仁縣; pinyin: Chóngrén Xiàn) is a county of Jiangxi province, People's Republic of China. It is under the jurisdiction of the prefecture-level city of Fuzhou.

== Administrative divisions ==
In the present, Chongren County has 7 towns and 8 townships.

7 towns

- Bashan (巴山镇)
- Xiangshan (相山镇)
- Hangbu (航埠镇)
- Sunfang (孙坊镇)
- Heshang (河上镇)
- Libei (礼陂镇)
- Ma'an (马鞍镇)

8 townships

- Shizhuang (石庄乡)
- Liujiaqiao (六家桥乡)
- Bailu (白路乡)
- Sanshan (三山乡)
- Baibei (白陂乡)
- Taoyuan (桃源乡)
- Xufang (许坊乡)
- Guowei (郭圩乡)

== Demographics ==
The population of the district was 304,806 in 1999.

== Climate ==
Climate data for Chongren, elevation 79 m (259 ft), (1991–2020 normals, extremes 1981–2010)
Month	Jan	Feb	Mar	Apr	May	Jun	Jul	Aug	Sep	Oct	Nov	Dec	Year
Record high °C (°F)	26.8 (80.2)	30.3 (86.5)	33.7 (92.7)	35.4 (95.7)	36.5 (97.7)	37.3 (99.1)	41.0 (105.8)	40.7 (105.3)	38.4 (101.1)	36.3 (97.3)	33.4 (92.1)	26.0 (78.8)	41.0 (105.8)
Mean daily maximum °C (°F)	9.8 (49.6)	12.9 (55.2)	16.9 (62.4)	23.5 (74.3)	28.0 (82.4)	30.6 (87.1)	34.4 (93.9)	33.7 (92.7)	29.9 (85.8)	24.9 (76.8)	18.8 (65.8)	12.6 (54.7)	23.0 (73.4)
Daily mean °C (°F)	5.5 (41.9)	8.1 (46.6)	12.0 (53.6)	18.2 (64.8)	22.9 (73.2)	26.0 (78.8)	29.1 (84.4)	28.4 (83.1)	24.6 (76.3)	19.1 (66.4)	13.2 (55.8)	7.3 (45.1)	17.9 (64.2)
Mean daily minimum °C (°F)	2.6 (36.7)	4.9 (40.8)	8.7 (47.7)	14.4 (57.9)	19.1 (66.4)	22.7 (72.9)	25.0 (77.0)	24.7 (76.5)	21.1 (70.0)	15.2 (59.4)	9.3 (48.7)	3.7 (38.7)	14.3 (57.7)
Record low °C (°F)	−7.3 (18.9)	−8.3 (17.1)	−2.9 (26.8)	1.3 (34.3)	9.6 (49.3)	14.0 (57.2)	18.0 (64.4)	19.4 (66.9)	12.7 (54.9)	2.1 (35.8)	−2.9 (26.8)	−12.2 (10.0)	−12.2 (10.0)
Average precipitation mm (inches)	89.6 (3.53)	108.2 (4.26)	209.3 (8.24)	219.0 (8.62)	254.9 (10.04)	329.9 (12.99)	163.4 (6.43)	148.8 (5.86)	81.2 (3.20)	55.6 (2.19)	96.7 (3.81)	72.1 (2.84)	1,828.7 (72.01)
Average precipitation days (≥ 0.1 mm)	14.3	13.9	18.7	17.7	16.9	17.3	11.4	12.7	8.9	8.3	10.5	10.9	161.5
Average snowy days	2.7	1.6	0.3	0	0	0	0	0	0	0	0	0.9	5.5
Average relative humidity (%)	84	83	85	82	82	84	77	80	82	80	82	81	82
Mean monthly sunshine hours	73.5	74.5	80.5	110.1	130.4	130.0	226.8	195.5	155.6	147.0	120.9	112.0	1,556.8
Percentage possible sunshine	22	24	22	29	31	31	54	49	42	42	38	35	35
Source: China Meteorological Administration
