= Yihuang County =

Yihuang County 宜黄县 Ihwang; Yihwang
- County
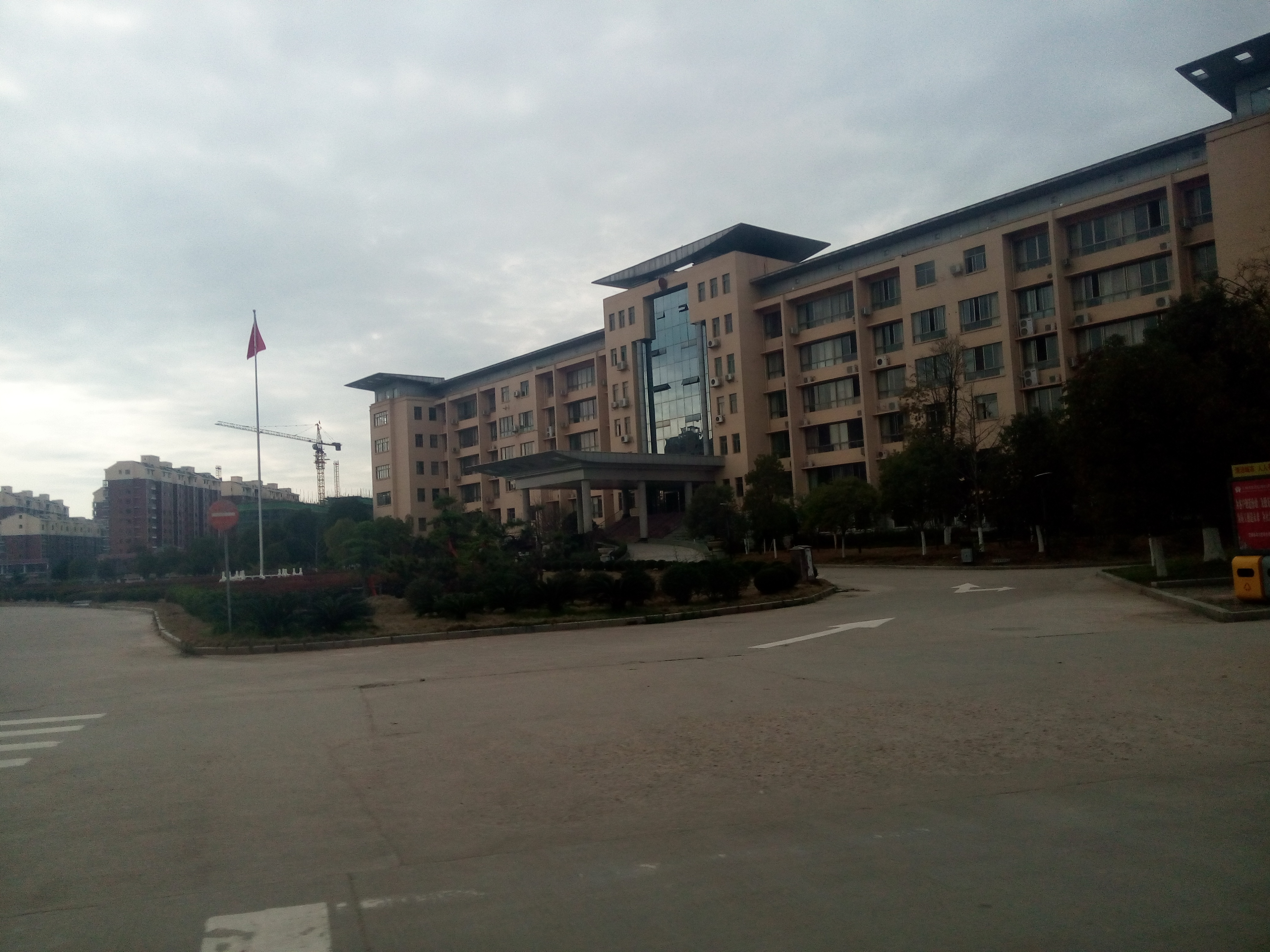

- Location in Jiangxi
- Coordinates: 27°32′46″N 116°13′19″E
- Country: People's Republic of China
- Province: Jiangxi
- Prefecture-level city: Fuzhou

Area
  - Total: 1,944 km^{2} (751 sq mi)

Population (2018)
  - Total: 240,000
  - Density: 120/km^{2} (320/sq mi)
- Time zone: UTC+8 (China Standard)
- Postal Code: 344400

Yihuang County (simplified Chinese: 宜黄县; traditional Chinese: 宜黃縣; pinyin: Yíhuáng Xiàn) is a county of east-central Jiangxi province, People's Republic of China. It is under the jurisdiction of the prefecture-level city of Fuzhou.

== Administrative divisions ==
In the present, Yihuang County has 7 towns and 5 townships.

7 towns

- Fenggang (凤冈镇)
- Tangyin (棠阴镇)
- Huangpi (黄陂镇)
- Dongpo (东陂镇)
- Lixi (梨溪镇)
- Erdu (二都镇)
- Zhonggang (中港镇)

5 townships

- Xinfeng (新丰乡)
- Shengang (神冈乡)
- Zhenkou (圳口乡)
- Nanyuan (南源乡)
- Taobei (桃陂乡)

== Demographics ==
The population of the district was 203,551 in 1999.

== Climate ==
Climate data for Yihuang, elevation 120 m (390 ft), (1991–2020 normals, extremes 1981–2010)
Month	Jan	Feb	Mar	Apr	May	Jun	Jul	Aug	Sep	Oct	Nov	Dec	Year
Record high °C (°F)	27.2 (81.0)	29.8 (85.6)	33.7 (92.7)	36.5 (97.7)	36.4 (97.5)	37.7 (99.9)	41.1 (106.0)	40.5 (104.9)	38.8 (101.8)	35.7 (96.3)	33.4 (92.1)	27.4 (81.3)	41.1 (106.0)
Mean daily maximum °C (°F)	10.1 (50.2)	13.3 (55.9)	17.3 (63.1)	23.8 (74.8)	28.2 (82.8)	30.7 (87.3)	34.5 (94.1)	33.6 (92.5)	29.7 (85.5)	24.7 (76.5)	18.9 (66.0)	12.8 (55.0)	23.1 (73.6)
Daily mean °C (°F)	5.8 (42.4)	8.5 (47.3)	12.3 (54.1)	18.4 (65.1)	22.9 (73.2)	26.0 (78.8)	28.9 (84.0)	28.0 (82.4)	24.5 (76.1)	19.0 (66.2)	13.3 (55.9)	7.5 (45.5)	17.9 (64.3)
Mean daily minimum °C (°F)	3.0 (37.4)	5.4 (41.7)	9.0 (48.2)	14.7 (58.5)	19.2 (66.6)	22.8 (73.0)	25.0 (77.0)	24.4 (75.9)	21.0 (69.8)	15.3 (59.5)	9.6 (49.3)	4.1 (39.4)	14.5 (58.0)
Record low °C (°F)	−7.4 (18.7)	−4.6 (23.7)	−3.7 (25.3)	1.9 (35.4)	8.7 (47.7)	12.8 (55.0)	18.6 (65.5)	19.0 (66.2)	12.8 (55.0)	1.7 (35.1)	−2.5 (27.5)	−12.2 (10.0)	−12.2 (10.0)
Average precipitation mm (inches)	92.0 (3.62)	107.8 (4.24)	218.5 (8.60)	223.0 (8.78)	256.3 (10.09)	314.6 (12.39)	172.8 (6.80)	149.9 (5.90)	94.6 (3.72)	61.6 (2.43)	94.1 (3.70)	71.2 (2.80)	1,856.4 (73.07)
Average precipitation days (≥ 0.1 mm)	14.7	14.6	19.6	18.0	18.1	17.1	11.6	14.3	10.8	8.8	11.4	11.7	170.7
Average snowy days	1.8	1.1	0.3	0	0	0	0	0	0	0	0	0.7	3.9
Average relative humidity (%)	84	83	84	82	81	82	75	79	81	81	83	81	81
Mean monthly sunshine hours	72.0	73.5	76.6	104.2	123.4	125.9	227.2	192.0	145.8	138.3	114.8	110.8	1,504.5
Percentage possible sunshine	22	23	20	27	30	30	54	48	40	39	36	34	34
Source: China Meteorological Administration
