= Hunan Subdistrict =

Hunan Subdistrict 湖南街道
- Subdistrict
- Location in Liaoning
- Coordinates: 41°5′25″N 123°0′16″E
- Country: People's Republic of China
- Province: Liaoning
- Prefecture-level city: Anshan
- District: Tiedong District
- Time zone: UTC+8 (China Standard)

Hunan Subdistrict (Chinese: 湖南街道; pinyin: Húnán Jiēdào) is a subdistrict in Tiedong District, Anshan, Liaoning province, China. As of 2018, it has 8 residential communities under its administration.

== See also ==
- List of township-level divisions of Liaoning
