= Linchuan, Fuzhou =

Linchuan 临川区 Linchwan
- District
- Location in Fuzhou City

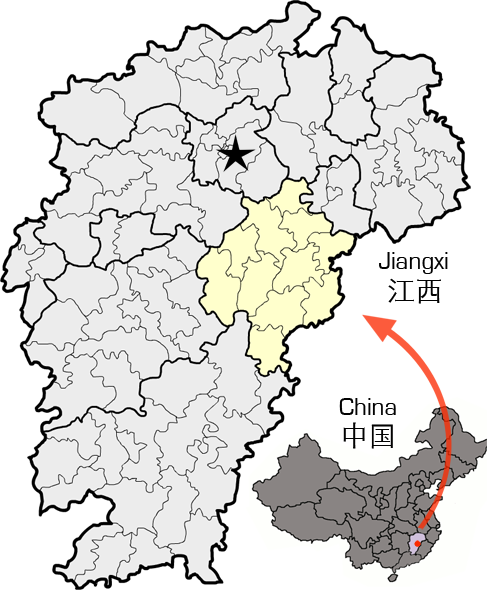
- Location of Fuzhou City in Jiangxi
- Coordinates: 27°58′38″N 116°21′36″E
- Country: People's Republic of China
- Province: Jiangxi
- Prefecture-level city: Fuzhou

Area
  - Total: 2,124.08 km^{2} (820.11 sq mi)

Population (2018)
  - Total: 1,300,000
  - Density: 610/km^{2} (1,600/sq mi)
- Time zone: UTC+8 (China Standard)
- Postal Code: 344000

Linchuan District (simplified Chinese: 临川区; traditional Chinese: 臨川區; pinyin: Línchuān Qū) is one of two built-up areas (districts) of the city of Fuzhou, Jiangxi province, People's Republic of China.

Before A.D. 762, the administration region located in Chi gang; since then, the administration region moved to western bank of Lianfan river (連樊水西陲).

== Administrative divisions ==
In the present, Linchuan District has 7 subdistricts, 18 towns and 7 townships under its jurisdiction.

7 subdistricts

- Qingyun (青云街道)
- Xidajie (西大街街道)
- Jinggonglu (荆公路街道)
- Liushuiqiao (六水桥街道)
- Wenchang (文昌街道)
- Chengxi (城西街道)
- Zhongling (钟岭街道)

18 towns

- Shangdundu (上顿渡镇)
- Wenquan (温泉镇)
- Gaoping (高坪镇)
- Qiuxi (秋溪镇)
- Rongshan (荣山镇)
- Longxi (龙溪镇)
- Dagang (大岗镇)
- Yunshan (云山镇)
- Changkai (唱凯镇)
- Luozhen (罗针镇)
- Luohu (罗湖镇)
- Taiyang (太阳镇)
- Dongguan (东馆镇)
- Tengqiao (腾桥镇)
- Qingni (青泥镇)
- Xiaoqiao (孝桥镇)
- Fubei (抚北镇)
- Chonggang (崇岗镇)

7 townships

- Zhanping (展坪乡)
- Liancheng (连城乡)
- Tongyuan (桐源乡)
- Hunan (湖南乡)
- Pengtian (鹏田乡)
- Maopai (茅排乡)
- Hebu (河埠乡)
