= Hunan, Zhejiang =

Hunan 湖南镇
- Town
- Location in Zhejiang
- Coordinates: 28.7089°N 118.8365°E
- Country: People's Republic of China
- Province: Zhejiang
- Prefecture-level city: Quzhou
- District: Qujiang District
- Time zone: UTC+8 (China Standard)

Hunan (Chinese: 湖南; pinyin: Húnán) is a town under the administration of Qujiang District, Quzhou, Zhejiang, China. As of 2018, it has 9 villages under its administration.
