= Hunan, Fujian =

Hunan 湖南镇
- Town
- Location in Fujian Hunan (China)
- Coordinates: 25.9714°N 119.6457°E
- Country: People's Republic of China
- Province: Fujian
- Prefecture-level city: Fuzhou
- District: Changle District
- Time zone: UTC+8 (China Standard)

Hunan (Chinese: 湖南; pinyin: Húnán) is a town under the administration of Changle District, Fuzhou, Fujian, China. As of 2018, it has one residential community and 10 villages under its administration.
