= Nanfeng County =

County in Jiangxi, China

Nanfeng County 南丰县
- County
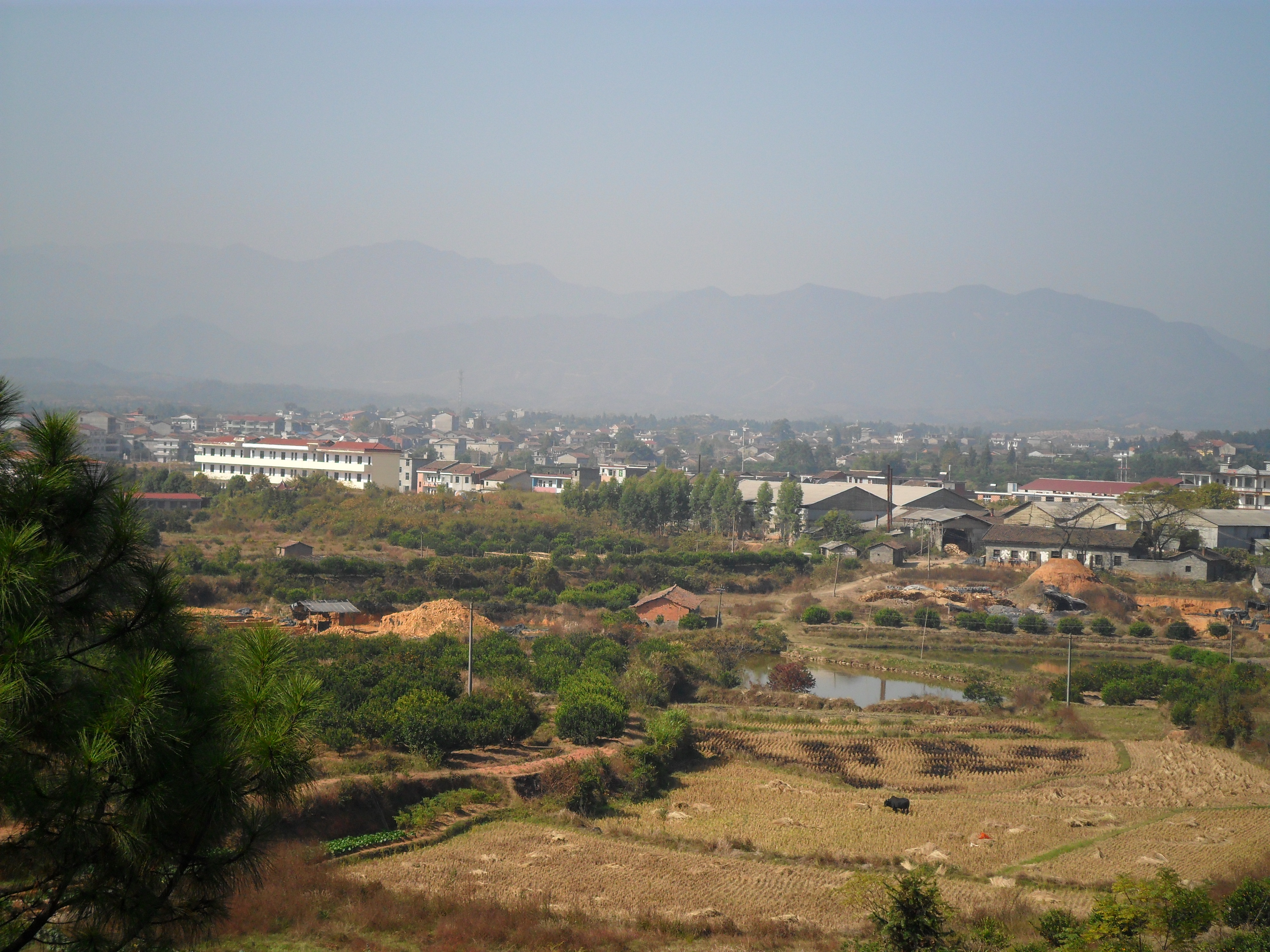

- Coordinates: 27°13′06″N 116°31′33″E
- Country: People's Republic of China
- Province: Jiangxi
- Prefecture-level city: Fuzhou

Area
  - Total: 1,909.28 km^{2} (737.18 sq mi)
- Elevation: 106 m (348 ft)

Population (2010)
  - Total: 287,932
  - Density: 150.807/km^{2} (390.587/sq mi)
- Time zone: UTC+8 (China Standard)
- Postal code: 361023
- Area code: +86

Nanfeng County
- Chinese: 南丰县
Transcriptions
Standard Mandarin
- Hanyu Pinyin: Nánfēng Xiàn
- Wade–Giles: Nan2-fêng1 Hsien4
- IPA: [nǎn fə́ŋ ɕiân]
Gan
- Romanization: Lanfung
Yue: Cantonese
- Yale Romanization: Nàahmfūng Yuhn
- Jyutping: Naam4fung1 Jyun6
Southern Min
- Hokkien POJ: Lâmphong Koāiⁿ
- Tâi-lô: Lâmphong Kuāiⁿ

Nanfeng County (simplified Chinese: 南丰县; traditional Chinese: 南豐縣; pinyin: Nánfēng Xiàn) is a county in the east of Jiangxi province, China, bordering Fujian province to the southeast. It is under the administration of the prefecture-level city of Fuzhou. It has an area of 1,920 square kilometers, administers 7 towns, 5 townships, and 2 similar to township units, with a population of nearly 300,000.

== Demographics ==
As of 2010, Nanfeng has a population of 287,932. 20% are children under the age of 15, 72% are adults aged 15–64, and 6% adults over 65.

== History ==
In the second year of Wu Taiping of the Three Kingdoms (257), the southern part of Nancheng County was split and incorporated as Feng County, but to differentiate it from Feng County, Jiangsu, it was named Nanfeng County, Nan meaning south.

In the 19th year of Yuan Zhiyuan (1282), Nanfeng County was promoted to Nanfeng Prefecture, controlled directly under Jiangxi Province. In the third year of Ming Hongwu (1370), Nanfeng county was restored under the Jianchang House.

In the early years of the Republic of China, the county was part of Yuzhang Subdistrict. In 1927, Yuzhang was abolished, and it was transferred to the Seventh District of Jiangxi Province, seated in Qincheng Town.

After 1949, it was transferred to the jurisdiction of Fuzhou Prefecture.

== Geography ==
Nanfeng County is surrounded to the east and west by mountains, and the Fu River Valley runs through the middle.

== Climate ==
Climate data for Nanfeng, elevation 112 m (367 ft), (1991–2020 normals, extremes 1981–2010)
Month	Jan	Feb	Mar	Apr	May	Jun	Jul	Aug	Sep	Oct	Nov	Dec	Year
Record high °C (°F)	27.5 (81.5)	30.5 (86.9)	32.1 (89.8)	35.6 (96.1)	35.5 (95.9)	37.9 (100.2)	40.8 (105.4)	40.8 (105.4)	38.5 (101.3)	37.1 (98.8)	32.1 (89.8)	27.0 (80.6)	40.8 (105.4)
Mean daily maximum °C (°F)	11.1 (52.0)	14.3 (57.7)	17.7 (63.9)	24.1 (75.4)	28.2 (82.8)	30.7 (87.3)	34.4 (93.9)	33.9 (93.0)	30.6 (87.1)	25.7 (78.3)	19.9 (67.8)	13.8 (56.8)	23.7 (74.7)
Daily mean °C (°F)	6.8 (44.2)	9.5 (49.1)	13.1 (55.6)	19.0 (66.2)	23.3 (73.9)	26.3 (79.3)	29.2 (84.6)	28.7 (83.7)	25.5 (77.9)	20.4 (68.7)	14.6 (58.3)	8.7 (47.7)	18.8 (65.8)
Mean daily minimum °C (°F)	3.8 (38.8)	6.2 (43.2)	9.8 (49.6)	15.4 (59.7)	19.8 (67.6)	23.1 (73.6)	25.3 (77.5)	25.0 (77.0)	21.9 (71.4)	16.4 (61.5)	10.7 (51.3)	5.0 (41.0)	15.2 (59.4)
Record low °C (°F)	−5.4 (22.3)	−4.9 (23.2)	−2.6 (27.3)	4.0 (39.2)	9.6 (49.3)	14.2 (57.6)	19.3 (66.7)	19.7 (67.5)	13.7 (56.7)	3.4 (38.1)	−1.4 (29.5)	−10.8 (12.6)	−10.8 (12.6)
Average precipitation mm (inches)	79.2 (3.12)	104.2 (4.10)	215.7 (8.49)	213.7 (8.41)	267.7 (10.54)	343.8 (13.54)	176.8 (6.96)	140.1 (5.52)	75.8 (2.98)	57.8 (2.28)	88.2 (3.47)	60.5 (2.38)	1,823.5 (71.79)
Average precipitation days (≥ 0.1 mm)	12.8	13.7	18.8	17.5	17.2	17.7	11.3	12.4	8.6	6.6	9.0	9.1	154.7
Average snowy days	2.3	1.3	0.3	0	0	0	0	0	0	0	0	0.7	4.6
Average relative humidity (%)	81	80	82	80	80	81	73	76	77	75	78	77	78
Mean monthly sunshine hours	76.9	78.4	79.2	104.8	125.0	130.9	235.7	208.4	165.1	156.2	127.9	114.0	1,602.5
Percentage possible sunshine	23	25	21	27	30	32	56	52	45	44	40	35	36
Source: China Meteorological Administration

== Administrative Divisions ==
Nanfeng County has 7 towns and 5 townships.:

7 towns

- Qincheng (琴城镇)
- Taihe (太和镇)
- Baishe (白舍镇)
- Shishan (市山镇)
- Qiawan (洽湾镇)
- Sangtian (桑田镇)
- Zixiao (紫霄镇)

5 towns

- Sanxi (三溪乡)
- Dongping (东坪乡)
- Laixi (莱溪乡)
- Taiyuan (太源乡)
- Fufang (傅坊乡)

Other

Nanfeng County Governor Red Reclamation Farm, and Nanfeng Industrial Park.

== Transportation ==
Highways:

- National Road 206
- Jiguang Expressway

Railways:

- Ying-Yuan Railway (Yingtan–Fuzhou–Ruijin–Meizhou–Shantou) Railway (planned)
- Xiangtang–Putian Railway (Changfu) Railway

== Tourist attractions ==
Baihua Bridge, Hengshi Mountain, Dishui Rocks, Yangmeizhai, Hanbu Mountain, Geshi Rock, Zixiao View, are all Danxia landforms located in Nanfeng.

Other tourist attractions include the Zeng Gong Memorial Hall, Dizang Temple, Junfeng Mountain (which rises 1760 meters above sea level), and Tanhu Reservoir.

== Notable people ==
- Zeng Gong
- Zhao Xingyu

== Specialties ==
Nanfeng tangerine: The Nanfeng tangerine has been cultivated for more than 1300 years. During the Kaiyuan era, Nanfeng became a major citrus producing area, with an output of more than 100 million jin (110 million lbs, 50 million kg) per year, and the citrus produced was classified as a royal tribute. Also known as the "tiny tangerine", the Nanfeng tangerine is small, 2–4 cm in diameter, with thin skin, sweet juice, a rich aroma, golden color, and is nutrient-rich." In the 1950s, Joseph Stalin tasted the tangerine and praised it as "the king of oranges". In 1962, the tangerine was awarded one of the top ten orange varieties in the country, and in 1986 and 89, was rated as the national high-quality fruit. At the 99 China International Farmer's Expo, it was rated as a famous brand product. In 1995, Nanfeng county was named by the Ministry of Agriculture as "the hometown of the Chinese citrus".

Nanfeng mud stoves: During the 13th year of the Guangxu emperor of the Qing dynasty (1887), Nanfeng County began to produce mud stoves, wood stoves, and charcoal stoves. Previously known as salt furnaces, they were renamed Nanfeng mud stoves in 1953. The raw material that is used is viscous clay, and the production process includes refining, compacting, planing, polishing, baseting, chassis, packaging, and the like. Because of its beautiful appearance, white colour, strong bearing, its ability to withstand high temperatures without cracking, and durability, it has been a special product of Nanfeng for more than 100 years.

Nanfeng pickled vegetables: Also known as "傩菜" (nuó cài), processed by the traditional pickling process. It is another local specialty agricultural product with a long history of planting and processing in Nanfeng.
