= Fuzhou, Jiangxi =

Prefecture-level city in Jiangxi, China

Fuzhou 抚州市 Fuchow
- Prefecture-level city
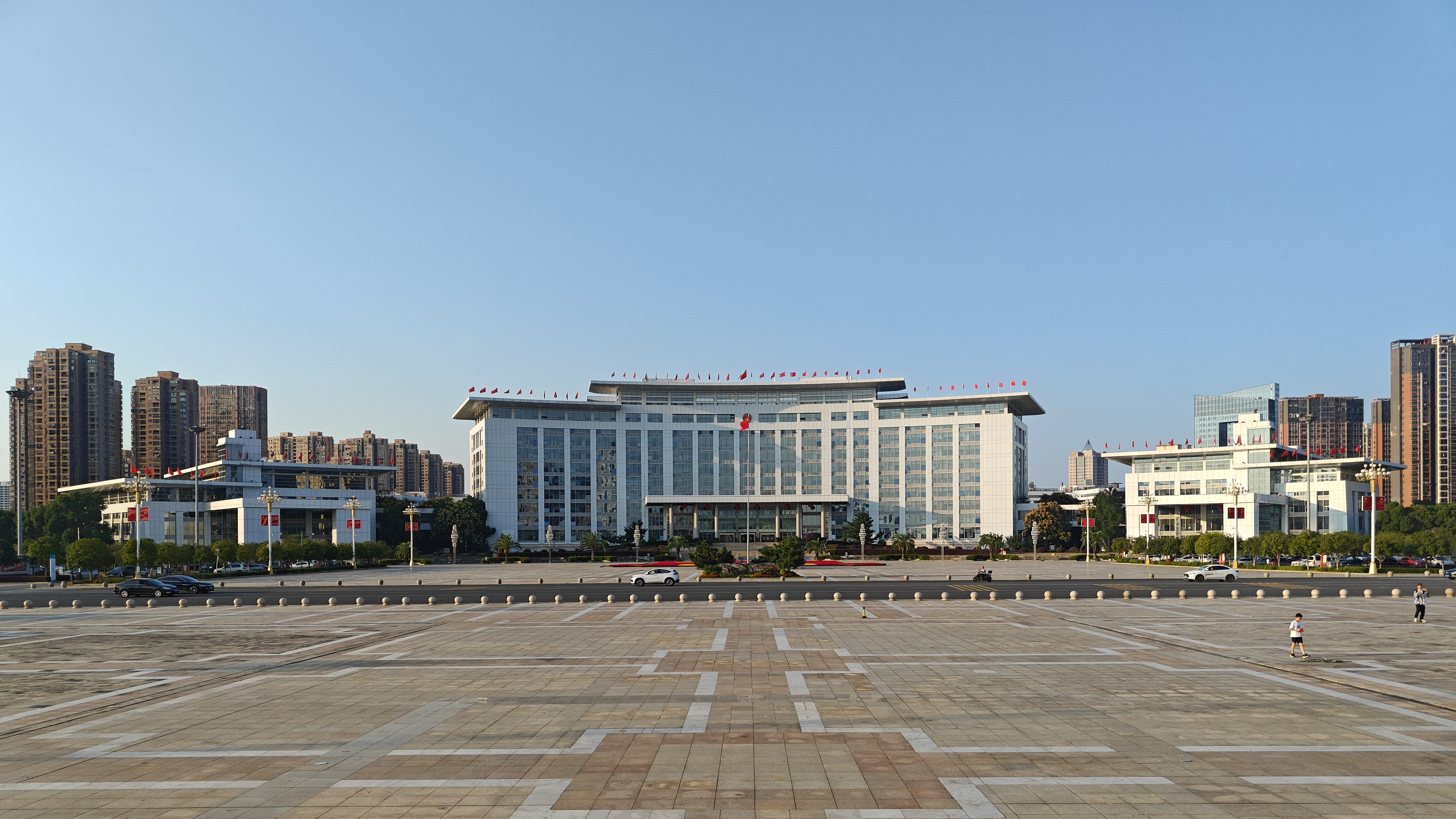
- Municipal Administrative Center in 2023

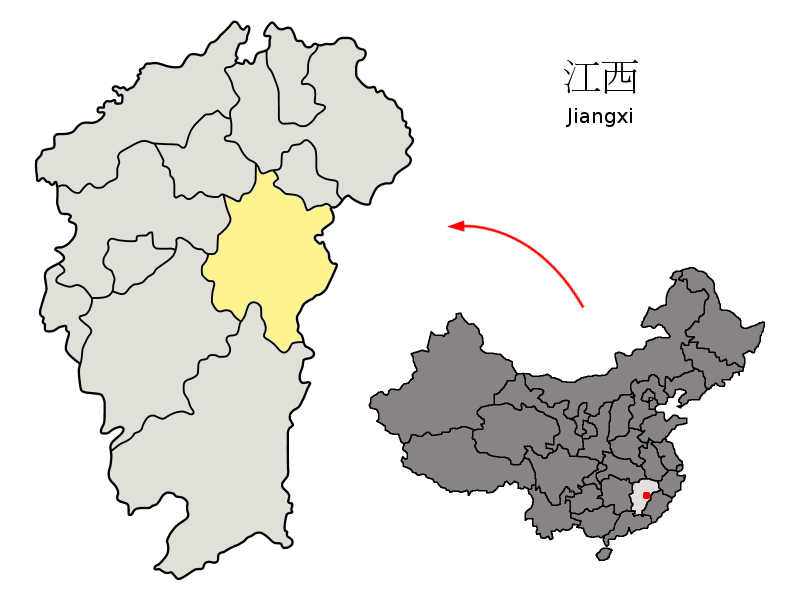
- Location of Fuzhou within Jiangxi

- Location in China
- Coordinates (Fuzhou municipal government): 27°56′56″N 116°21′29″E
- Country: People's Republic of China
- Province: Jiangxi
- Municipal seat: Linchuan District

Government
  - Mayor: Hu Jianfei (胡剑飞); Acting
  - Secretary: Fan Xiaolin (范小林)

Area
  - Land: 18,786 km^{2} (7,253 sq mi)
  - Urban: 3,392 km^{2} (1,310 sq mi)
  - Metro: 3,392 km^{2} (1,310 sq mi)
- Elevation: 45 m (148 ft)

Population (2020 census)
  - Prefecture-level city: 3,614,866
  - Density: 192.42/km^{2} (498.37/sq mi)
  - Urban: 1,486,267
  - Urban density: 438.2/km^{2} (1,135/sq mi)
  - Metro: 1,486,267
  - Metro density: 438.2/km^{2} (1,135/sq mi)

GDP
  - Total: CN¥ 110.5 billion US$ 17.7 billion
  - Per capita: CN¥ 27,735; US$ 4,453
- Time zone: UTC+8 (China Standard)
- Postal code: 344000
- Area code: 0794
- ISO 3166 code: CN-JX-10
- Licence plate prefixes: 赣F
- Website: english.jxfz.gov.cn

Fuzhou (Note: /fuːˈdʒoʊ/; simplified Chinese: 抚州; traditional Chinese: 撫州; pinyin: Fǔzhōu) is a prefecture-level city in the northeastern part of Jiangxi province, People's Republic of China.

Fuzhou is located to the south of the provincial capital Nanchang, bordered in the east by Fujian Province. Its total area is 18,800 km^{2} (7,300 sq mi). The population is 3,900,000.At the end of 2024 and the beginning of 2025, the permanent population will be 3.5348 million. The area is located northwest of the Wuyi Mountains, and is drained by the Fu River (Fuhe), which flows northwest to the Poyang Lake (in the neighboring Nanchang Prefecture).

== History ==
The area was part of Chu during the Warring States period. After being conquered by the Qin, it was included in the Jiujiang Commandery.

In 204 BC, the territory was added to the Huainan Kingdom. Two years later, Yuzhang Commandery was dissociated from Huainan. Names of the counties Nancheng and Linru, both of which then part of Yuzhang, first appeared in this period.

In 257 AD, counties Linru and Nancheng were added to a new commandery, Linchuan. Thereafter, they were divided to 10 counties including Linru, Nancheng, Xiping, Xinjian, Xicheng, Yihuang, Anpu, Nanfeng, Yongcheng, Dongxing, with the administration center in Linru County. In 522 AD, another new commandery, Bashan, was divided from Linchuan, administering 7 counties Xinjian, Xining, Bashan, Dafeng, Xin'an, Xingping, Fengcheng. Linchuan and Bashan belonged to Gao State in 557 AD. The two commanderies were replaced by Fu Prefecture (Fuzhou) in 589 AD.

=== Tang dynasty and later ===
In 811 AD, Fuzhou was renamed as Shangzhou. In 975 AD, it was renamed as Junzhou. In 1149 AD, Le'an County was established in the prefecture, which administered counties Linchuan, Chongren, Yihuang, Jinxi and Le'an at that time. On June 23, 2000, Fuzhou City was officially established as a prefecture-level city in China.

== Economy ==
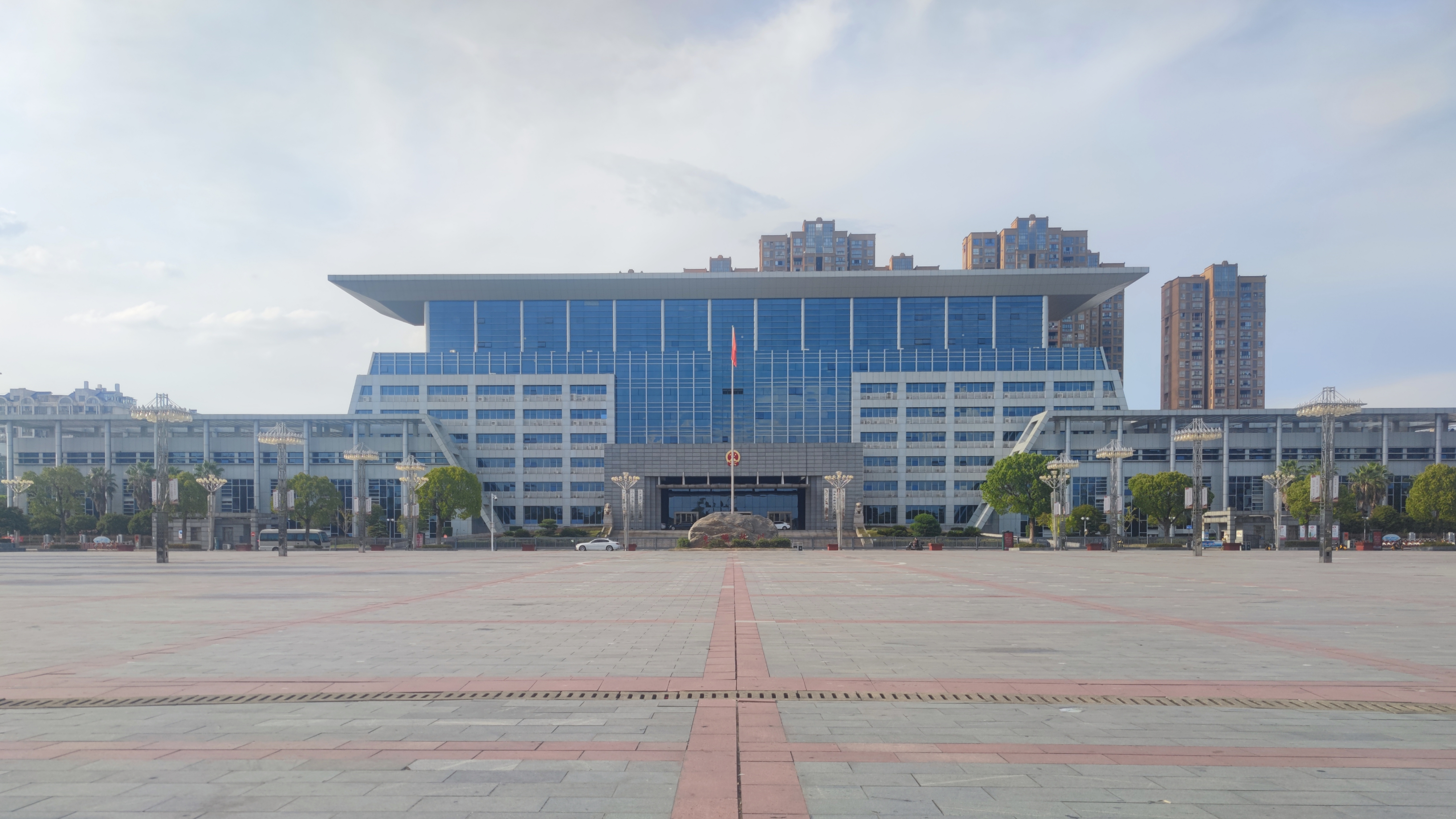
Linchuan District Administrative Center

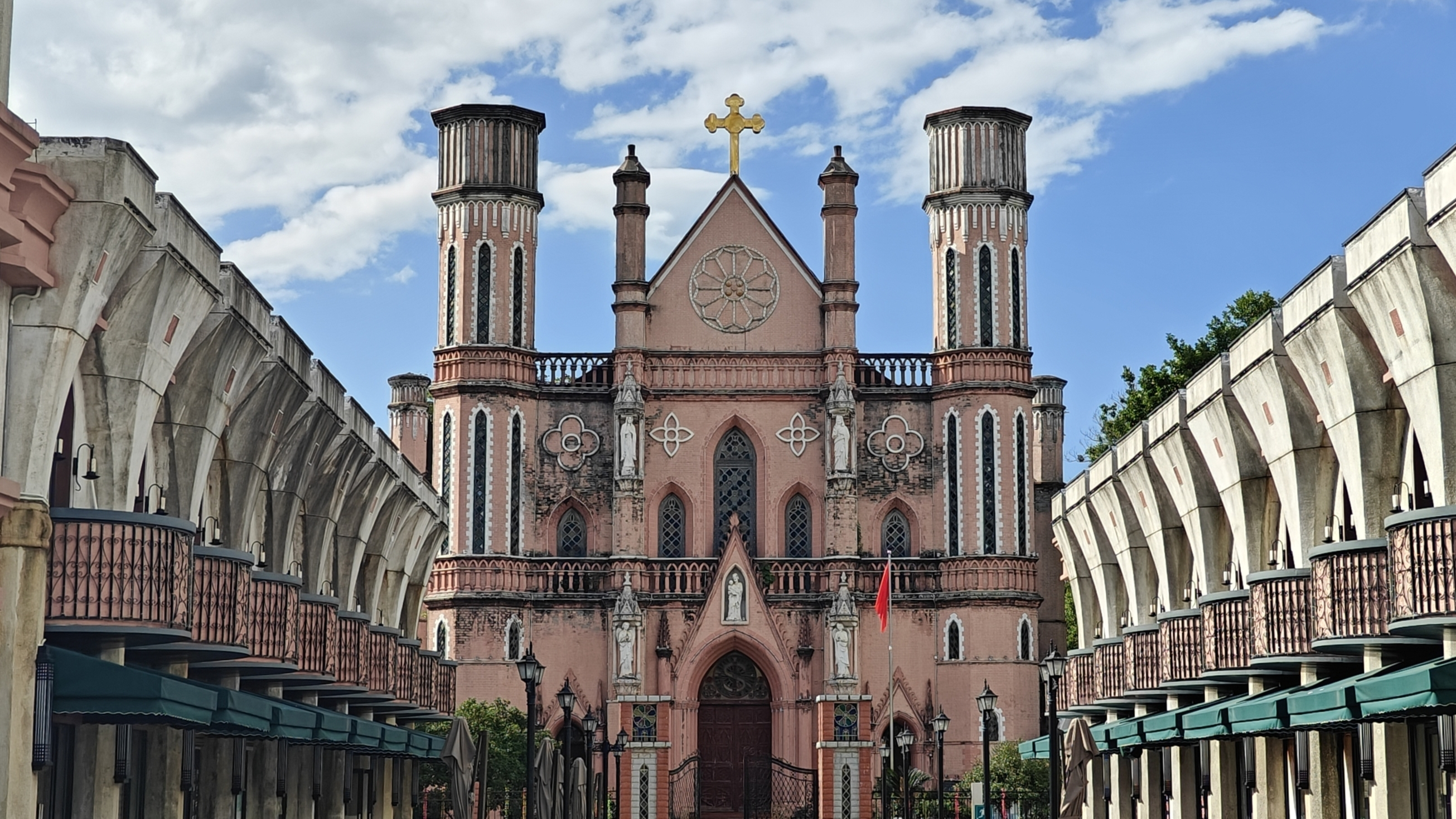
St. Joseph's Cathedral in Linchuan District

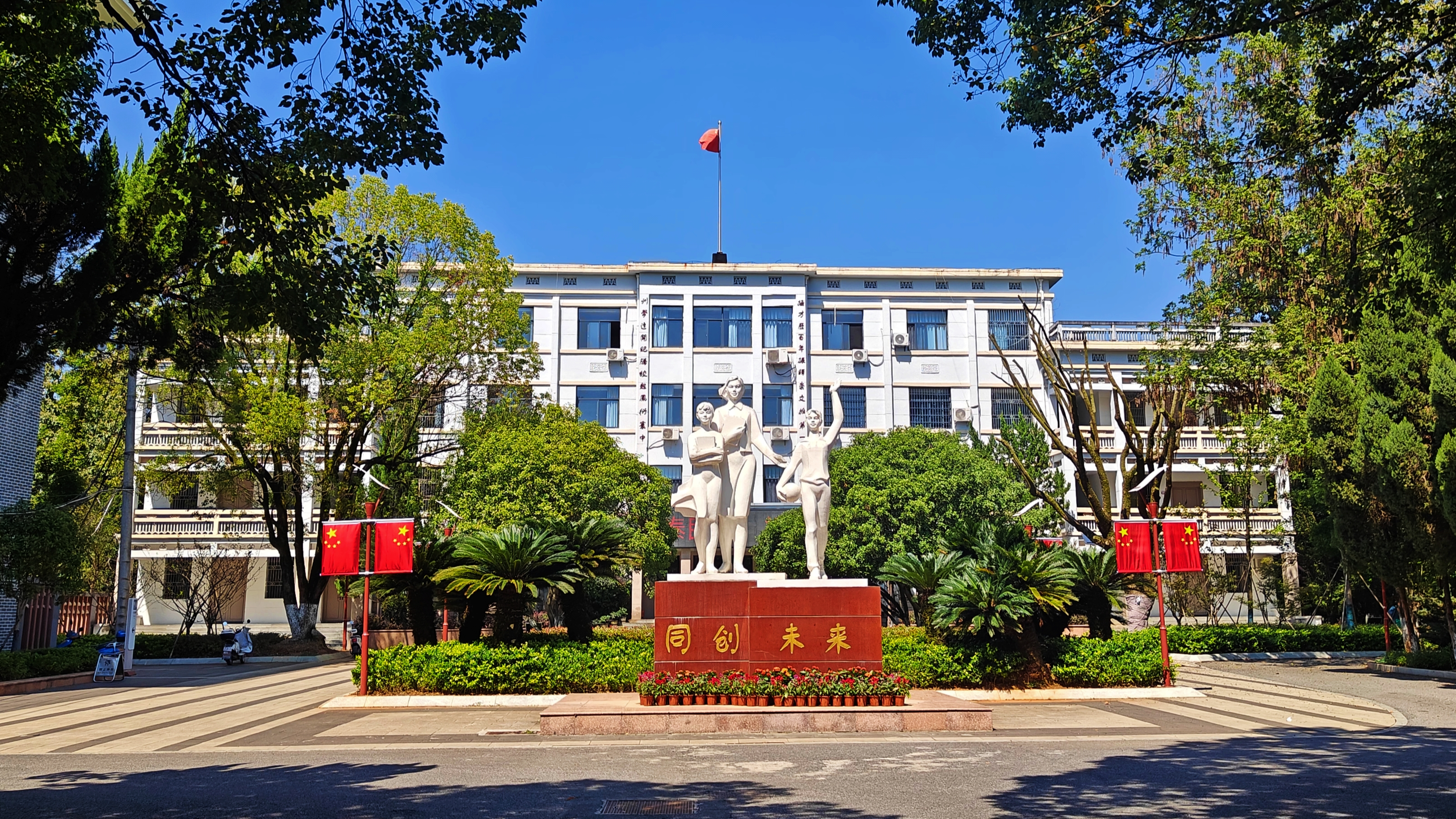
Fuzhou No. 1 Middle School

The main industries in the area are food, textiles, food processing and light-modeled cars.

In August 2021, the construction of the Fuzhou New Energy Vehicle Industrial Park project started, and a new energy vehicle industrial base with a complete industrial chain including complete vehicles, parts, and power batteries has now been built.

== Administration ==
Fuzhou is located in the eastern part of Jiangxi Province, between 115°35′ and 117°18′ east longitude and 26°29′ and 28°30′ north latitude.

Fuzhou has direct jurisdiction over two districts and nine counties:

Districts (区; qū):

- Linchuan District (临川区), the seat of the municipal government, CPC and Public Security bureaux and Intermediate People's Court.
- Dongxiang District (东乡区)

Counties (县; xiàn):

- Nancheng County (南城县)
- Nanfeng County (南丰县)
- Lichuan County (黎川县)
- Chongren County (崇仁县)
- Le'an County (乐安县)
- Yihuang County (宜黄县)
- Jinxi County (金溪县)
- Zixi County (资溪县)
- Guangchang County (广昌县)

Map
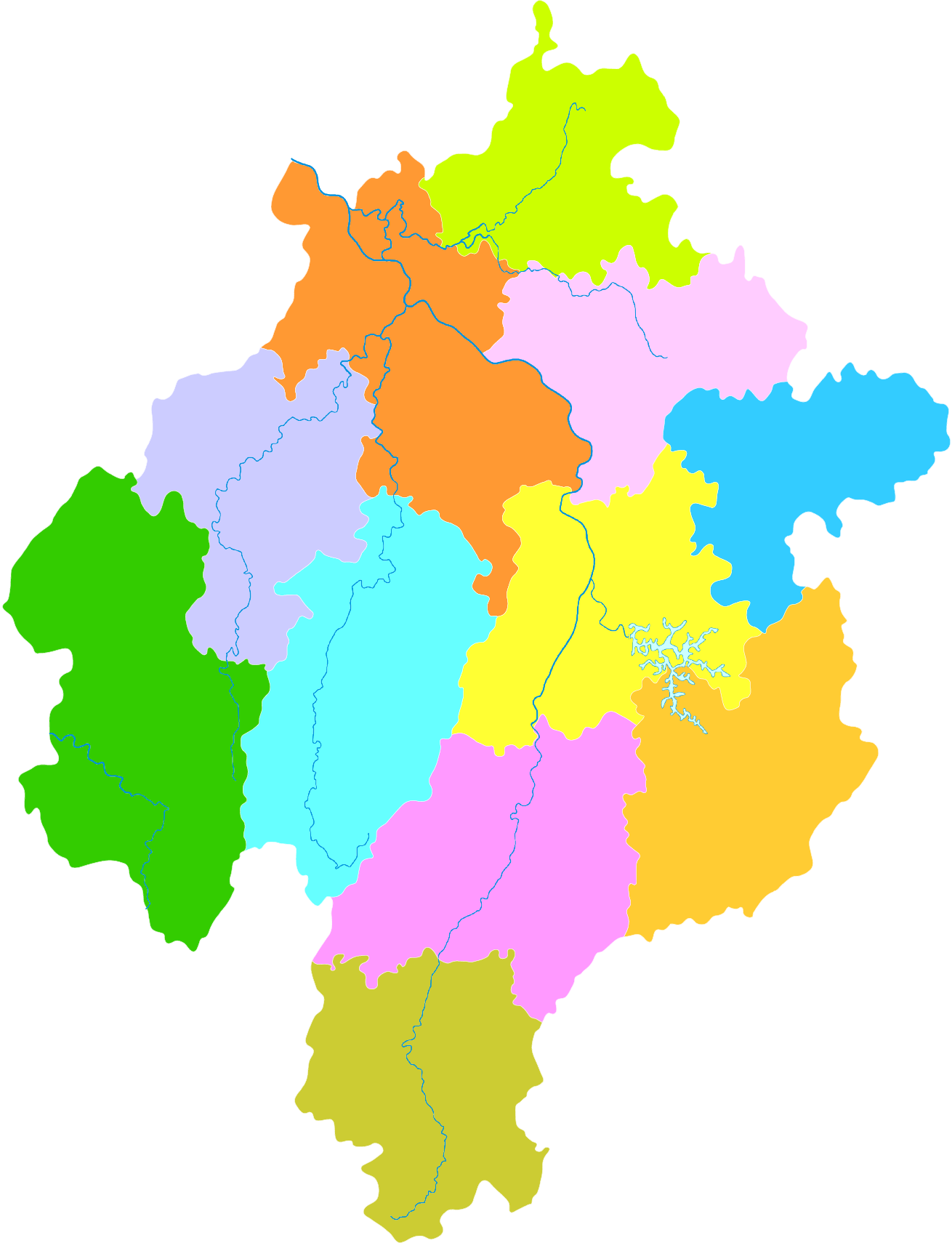

== Climate ==
Fuzhou also has a subtropical humid monsoon climate. The annual average temperature is 17.9 °C, the average sunshine hours are 1,700 hours, the annual average precipitation is 1,900 mm, the annual frost-free period is about 248 days, and the four seasons are distinct. Due to the warm and humid climate, sufficient sunlight and long frost-free period, crops have very favorable conditions for growth.

Climate data for Fuzhou, elevation 49 m (161 ft), (Linchuan District) (1991–2020 normals)
| Month | Jan | Feb | Mar | Apr | May | Jun | Jul | Aug | Sep | Oct | Nov | Dec | Year |
|---|---|---|---|---|---|---|---|---|---|---|---|---|---|
| Mean daily maximum °C (°F) | 9.8 (49.6) | 13.1 (55.6) | 17.8 (64.0) | 23.7 (74.7) | 28.3 (82.9) | 30.7 (87.3) | 34.7 (94.5) | 34.5 (94.1) | 30.1 (86.2) | 25.1 (77.2) | 18.7 (65.7) | 12.4 (54.3) | 23.2 (73.8) |
| Daily mean °C (°F) | 6.2 (43.2) | 8.8 (47.8) | 13.3 (55.9) | 18.9 (66.0) | 23.8 (74.8) | 26.6 (79.9) | 30.0 (86.0) | 29.7 (85.5) | 25.7 (78.3) | 20.6 (69.1) | 14.3 (57.7) | 8.1 (46.6) | 18.8 (65.9) |
| Mean daily minimum °C (°F) | 3.7 (38.7) | 5.9 (42.6) | 10.2 (50.4) | 15.4 (59.7) | 20.4 (68.7) | 23.7 (74.7) | 26.5 (79.7) | 26.2 (79.2) | 22.5 (72.5) | 17.3 (63.1) | 11.1 (52.0) | 5.1 (41.2) | 15.7 (60.2) |
| Average precipitation mm (inches) | 74.2 (2.92) | 103.4 (4.07) | 216.5 (8.52) | 210.9 (8.30) | 281.6 (11.09) | 332.8 (13.10) | 202.2 (7.96) | 116.5 (4.59) | 74.1 (2.92) | 45.4 (1.79) | 110.5 (4.35) | 73.7 (2.90) | 1,841.8 (72.51) |
| Average precipitation days (≥ 0.1 mm) | 13.4 | 13.3 | 18.3 | 15.9 | 16.1 | 17.1 | 10.5 | 10.2 | 8.6 | 7.3 | 11.5 | 9.9 | 152.1 |
| Average snowy days | 2.4 | 1.3 | 0.1 | 0 | 0 | 0 | 0 | 0 | 0 | 0 | 0.1 | 0.7 | 4.6 |
| Average relative humidity (%) | 78 | 78 | 78 | 75 | 75 | 79 | 70 | 71 | 75 | 73 | 77 | 75 | 75 |
| Mean monthly sunshine hours | 72.0 | 76.8 | 90.7 | 119.7 | 136.2 | 119.6 | 225.4 | 220.6 | 156.1 | 146.4 | 117.3 | 111.8 | 1,592.6 |
| Percentage possible sunshine | 22 | 24 | 24 | 31 | 32 | 29 | 53 | 55 | 43 | 41 | 37 | 35 | 36 |
Source: China Meteorological Administration

== Transportation ==
- Nanchang-Fuzhou Express railway (major service in Linchuan district; additional service in Nancheng County and Nanfeng County) The Changsha-Xiamen (Fuzhou) high-speed railway line is about 635 kilometers long, of which the newly planned line in Fujian is about 410 kilometers long, with a designed speed of 350 kilometers per hour.
- Yingtan-Xiamen Railway (limited service, available in Zixi County only)The Yingtan-Xiamen Railway starts from Yingtan Station in the north and ends at Xiamen Station in the south. It is 705 kilometers long and has 99 stations (including the Zhangzhou branch line).
- Hangzhou–Changsha High-Speed Railway: Fuzhou East Railway Station in Dongxiang District

== Recent history ==
- On 23 May 2010, a train traveling from Shanghai to Guilin derailed here due to landslides damaging the track.
- On 26 May 2011, three explosions struck government buildings. Two people were killed and at least six injured in the blasts. The cause of the blasts is being investigated.

== Famous people ==
Fuzhou is historically important as the home (specifically Linchuan) of Wang Anshi, the famous reformist prime minister of Song dynasty, Zeng Gong, an influential scholar and historian of the Song dynasty, and Tang Xianzu, the great Ming dynasty dramatist. Chinese neurobiologist Rao Yi was born in Nancheng County of Fuzhou, Jiangxi province. Longtime backup People's Liberation Army Astronaut Corps taikonaut Deng Qingming who finally flew on Shenzhou 15 after 24 years of waiting was born in Yihuang County of Fuzhou, Jiangxi province.
