= Chinese women in the Second Sino-Japanese War =

Most women in China were profoundly impacted by the Second Sino-Japanese War (also referred to in China as the War of Resistance), in which the Empire of Japan fought the Republic of China starting in 1937, primarily due to the Marco Polo Bridge Incident on July 7, 1937. On September 2, 1945, Japan formally surrendered. This war resulted in the deaths of approximately 20 million people, mostly the civilians in China.

Women's experiences during the war depended on a variety of factors, including class, place of origin, and social connections. While some groups of women in China were in a position to contribute to the resistance efforts, poor women in urban and rural areas fought every day to keep themselves and their families alive. The war's impact on women also varied by location, whether they stayed in regions controlled by the Nationalist Party, the Chinese Communist Party (CCP), or the Japanese.

While thousands of women in eastern China fled their homes for inland regions to escape Japanese occupation and the violence that came with it, women also stayed behind in occupied areas. The Nationalist government relocated several times throughout the war, from Nanjing to Wuhan, and after the fall of Wuhan, they established a wartime capital in Chongqing. Refugees who fled to Chongqing from the lower reaches of the Yangtze River in the east were referred to by locals as "downriver people" (Chinese: 下江人). Many women also migrated to Yan'an, the CCP's headquarters during the war, and other CCP revolutionary base areas in northern regions of China.

== Women's contributions to the war effort ==
Women contributed to the Second Sino-Japanese war in various capacities, such as in medical work, education, women's organizations, and on the battlefield. Women's work during the war was vitally important and helped China make it through the war.

=== Medical work ===
Women in China supported injured soldiers in CCP and Nationalist bases alike, working as nurses, doctors, and midwives during the war. While women had worked as caregivers before, women during the war provided medical care in public, which marked a shift in gender roles. Not only were women working outside of the home, but they were also making physical contact with male strangers. The war prompted the feminization of the nursing profession in China. There were roughly 60,000 women that served as nurses in the Army Corps. Getting paid wasn't something that began happening until 1944, when Congress decided to fix the law; this granted temporary commissions with full pay and privileges to the nurses. With these women breaking barriers, it didn't mean they received equal pay; most nurses worked for $111 a month.

Soldiers in China needed medical care for battle wounds, as well as for lethal diseases such as cholera and malaria. Nurses were in high demand for the state, and the number of registered nurses increased dramatically throughout the war, as did the number of nursing schools. Nurses in Chongqing performed various medical tasks, such as administering vaccines, in hospitals and on the street.

Nursing schools in Chongqing recruited young, educated, and unmarried women to enroll during the war. While women attended nursing schools during the war, Chinese provincial governments integrated nursing classes into high school curriculums. In 1937, high school girls in Hubei started taking compulsory nursing classes. In 1940, female high school graduates in Hunan and Sichuan were required to work as nurses, either for the military or for rural public health.

Women such as Zhou Meiyu helped professionalize the nursing industry and raise its status. While some nurses were paid, other women helped soldiers on a volunteer basis. Many women felt fulfilled working as nurses and accepted to work for low pay.

Women joined the Nationalist expeditionary army for the Burma campaign as nurses, office staff and interpreters.

=== Fundraising and relief work ===
Middle-class and upper-class women across China participated in various fundraising activities and led organizations to provide relief for soldiers, refugees, orphans, among other groups. Some of the services women in Chongqing organizations provided were clothing drives and soup kitchens. Volunteers in orphanages taught children a number of songs and plays with anti-Japanese sentiment alongside public health lessons.

Dozens of women's organizations registered with local governments across the country. Three important nationally recognized organizations during the war, which all relocated to Chongqing, were the "National Association of Chinese Women for the Cheering and Comforting of the Officers and Soldiers of the War of Self-Defense and Resistance against Japan", the "Wartime Child Welfare Protection Association", and the "Women’s Directorial Committee of New Life Movement Promotion Federation". Prominent women such as Song Meiling, Deng Yingchao, Shi Liang, and Li Dequan cooperated to lead these organizations.

The leaders of women's organizations in Chongqing created multiple job opportunities for hundreds of refugee women in the Songji experimental zone, located in Yongchuan. After this project was launched, refugee women worked at a textile factory, library, farm, and schools, among other places in Songji.

=== Teachers and students ===
Many urban, educated women from the east fled to Chongqing and taught in schools. They often integrated the war into their lessons, explaining why Chinese people should care and participate in the war effort. Refugee teachers at an elementary school in Chongqing taught students patriotic war songs and gave students essay assignments about the war. They also prompted young students to give speeches about the war to public audiences at neighboring markets.

Women and girls continued to attend school and college if their families could afford it. Due to the war, many leading educational institutions and preeminent teachers relocated to Chongqing, which meant local students received a better education than they otherwise would have. In addition to giving speeches, students in Chongqing contributed to the war effort by teaching lessons to peasants about the war, writing articles for wall bulletins, producing shoes and other goods for soldiers, and putting on performances at markets to spread awareness about the war.

Many high school girls and women college students volunteered to write letters for illiterate soldiers. These volunteers provided emotional support for soldiers, formed friendships, and boosted their morale through entertainment.

In 1939, Mao Zedong proposed creating a women's university where the CCP could develop female cadres. The Chinese Women's University was inaugurated on 20 July of that year in Yan'an, and Mao's inauguration speech emphasized the role of women in resisting the Japanese invasion of China. Mao stated, "The day all women in China rise up is the moment of China's revolutionary victory!"

=== Soldiers ===
Some women in the CCP-controlled front-line base areas joined armies to fight against Japanese soldiers, including the Eighth Route Army and the New Fourth Army. Some women participated in fighting, but more often, women were told to support the bases in other ways.

In May 1938, the women's battalion of Zhejiang formed with Nationalist leadership. Its more than 200 soldiers fought behind the Japanese lines.

In 1933, Guangxi established a military training program in public high schools for male and female students. In 1934, it was extended to students in middle school. After full-scale war broke out, Guangxi formed the women students army, which traveled on foot from Guangxi to Wuhan, doing propaganda work through drama performances and public rallies. Under General Li Zongren, the Guangxi women students army also rescued wounded soldiers and fought when necessary.

== War's impact on women ==
The war impacted women across China in striking ways. The household, gender roles, and women's occupations changed during the war. While often victims of murder and horrific acts of violence, women in China used various survival strategies to cope with the war's impact and fight for survival.

=== Refugees and migration ===
Many women in wartime China migrated to different regions, either to escape Japanese soldiers and bombing or disasters such as floods and famine. Many women also migrated to escape the Japanese soldiers enslaving them for sex as comfort women. With many of the Chinese women being forced to relocate and others migrating for their safety, this made it difficult accurately quantify them and track their contributions to the war. However, leaving one's home was not a smooth process for many women. Refugee mothers were responsible for looking after their children, which made it harder to make ends meet along the way to their next destination. Additionally, it was dangerous for women to leave their homes as they were sexually vulnerable to soldiers and bandits. Some women got pregnant on the way to their next destination.

For poor women in Chongqing, the mass arrival of refugees in their hometowns drove up prices, making it even more difficult to cover basic needs. Women from peasant families in Chongqing could barely make ends meet before the war, so they took on more jobs that sometimes put their lives at risk.

Wealthy, well-connected women in Chongqing had the means to relocate during the war. Amid the Chongqing bombing, wealthy women moved out of Sichuan temporarily and returned home afterward.

==== 1938 Yellow River Flood ====
A man-made disaster causing to slow down the Japanese advance and to create more time for relocation for the government to Chongqing. The National Revolutionary Army (NRA) did this by breaching the Yellow River dikes; breaching essentially means the intentional removal of flood defense structures, allowing the river to flow freely. Women in Henan who were displaced and affected by the 1938 Yellow River flood resorted to various survival strategies to stay alive during the war. Some women migrated to Nationalist-controlled regions of Henan, while others stayed behind in the flooded, occupied region. Women flood victims who stayed behind made a living by selling salt. Women who fled worked jobs in domestic service and textile arts, and many resorted to begging and prostitution. In some instances, families were forced to give their daughters away to another family or sell their daughters into prostitution.

=== Sexual violence ===
Women were subject to sexual violence throughout the Second Sino-Japanese War. While many women in occupied areas decided to stay indoors to avoid contact with Japanese soldiers, some braved the threat of leaving their houses. In many instances, women did not have a choice.

Across China, various situations and places were dangerous for women to go during the war, because of increased chances of being raped or assaulted. For instance, it was dangerous for women in Chongqing to dump garbage outside of the city, yet some women from poor peasant families did so to make a living.

Refugee women who fled their homes risked sexual assault and violence on the way to their next destination. In one instance, a refugee woman was forced to satisfy a man's sexual desires to protect her family and gain connections in a new city.

==== Nanjing Massacre ====
On December 13, 1937, Japanese soldiers invaded Nanjing, the capital of China at the time. Women of all ages in Nanjing were sexually assaulted, raped, and murdered by Japanese soldiers in the Nanjing Massacre. Women fled their homes and sought refuge in public spaces such as colleges. One woman resorted to covering herself in excrement to reduce the chances of being raped. In the first month of Japanese soldiers occupying the capital, estimates suggest there were 20,000 instances of rape. Rape victims who survived were traumatized and did not want to speak about their experiences after the war ended. Many woman choose avoid speaking about their sexual violence experiences primarily to not relive that traumatic time, feel shame or blame their self, and sadly to also avoid the feeling of not being believed.

==== Comfort women ====
Thousands of girls in China were forced to work in military brothels as sex slaves, also known as comfort women. While estimates vary, scholars agree that the number of women enslaved as comfort women numbered over 200,000. Women resorted to various tactics to make themselves less attractive and protect themselves. Some women in occupied regions wore unflattering clothing or covered their faces in ash.

The Tokyo war crimes trials did not address the enslavement of women for sex by the Japanese army, given that rape was not viewed as a war crime.

=== Social and economic impact ===
Due to a number of men leaving home to either work or fight, the structure of the household and gender roles shifted dramatically in various regions of China.

==== The household ====
The war tore many women's families apart. Refugee women were often permanently separated from their extended families. While refugee women lost their support systems, their mental health became impacted heavily with the separation. Many refugees experienced anxiety, depression, stress, physical health changes, appetite changes, and helplessness. However, they also gained certain freedoms living away from family, such as choosing one's own husband rather than having an arranged marriage.

Many women became widows during the war and often did not remarry. The likelihood of a woman remarrying depended on whether she had children and other family members to care for. The best outcome, if a woman was on her own, was marrying a poor man.

Women filed for divorce throughout the war, frequently because their husbands abandoned them. Women also ran away from their husbands during the war without facing legal repercussions. Other women stayed with their husbands despite being separated by the war. Some husbands sent their wives money when they were away, because they depended on his paycheck. However, the war disrupted the postal service in places like Chongqing, which meant that women struggled to meet basic needs and had to find alternate ways of getting money.

==== Labor and gender roles ====
With fewer men at home during the war, women took on different kinds of work to provide for their families, such as farming. It became increasingly common for women, especially poor women, to work in the fields during the war. Young girls worked in the fields as well. However, agricultural work involved several risks for women, including the shame of working outside and the threat of being surrounded by bandits and soldiers.

Women's occupations often varied by region. Women in Japan-occupied Shanghai, for instance, worked in stores, cotton mills, as models, and opera singers among other jobs. In CCP revolutionary base areas, such as Yan’an, women contributed to the self-sufficiency and independence of the bases by farming and making goods like shoes and clothing. The CCP bases relied heavily on women's labor for economic production. Women's participation in politics in CCP base areas varied. Some gained political experience at a village level, whereas in regions like Wuxiang, women did not participate in politics at all.

The war prompted the feminization of several industries, such as agriculture and nursing. By providing for their families by working out of the house, women disrupted gender norms and transformed gender roles. After the war, women in China continued working. They no longer had to rely solely on male family members to stay afloat.

== Media coverage and depictions of wartime women ==
In various mediums, such as cartoons, women in China during the war were depicted as victims of sexual violence and murder to inspire Chinese people to keep fighting. However, women were also depicted as strong and resilient. During the war, stories about famous heroines resurfaced in China. For instance, Hua Mulan became a central figure in plays, cartoons, poetry, and movies. In 1939, a movie called Mulan Joins the Army (木兰从军) was released, in which the story of Mulan was rewritten to show her taking action against the "foreign invaders" (which mirrored China's current situation against the Japanese) and included not-so-subtle parallels to events that happened in the Second Sino-Japanese War. Inspired from the 1939 film, Disney created an animated version title Mulan is 1998. This further showed representation and female empowerment while staring an Asian-American woman. This story continues to inspire young girls to challenge the status quo and be bold.

To commemorate International Women's Day in 1940, the Yan'an Soviet organized performances of plays showcasing heroic women, including Mother Yue Tattooing Characters, Liang Hongyu, and Qiu Jin. The selection of plays was intended to encourage the people, particularly women, in opposing the Japanese invasion of China.

=== Song Meiling ===
Song Meiling, the First Lady of the Republic of China and wife of Chiang Kai-shek, was the most prominent woman in China during the war. She traveled to the United States on multiple occasions and spoke in front of Congress to ask for increased aid. She frequently appeared in the press in China and overseas, demonstrating how women should support the war effort. She also took an active involvement in fundraising and caring for "warphans" or war orphans, to ensure China received donations overseas. Meiling was fluent in English and of the Christian faith, which allowed her to create a deeper connection with the United States and represent China effectively. Song Meiling was beloved by Americans, much more than her husband Chiang Kai-shek.

== Sources ==
- Barnes, Nicole Elizabeth (2018). Intimate Communities: Wartime Healthcare and the Birth of Modern China, 1937-1945. Univ of California Press. ISBN 978-0-520-97186-8.
- Chen, Janet Y. (2012). Guilty of Indigence: The Urban Poor in China, 1900-1953. Princeton University Press. ISBN 978-0-691-16195-2. JSTOR j.ctt7sqq5.
- Goodman, David S. G. (December 2000). "Revolutionary Women and Women in the Revolution: The Chinese Communist Party and Women in the War of Resistance to Japan, 1937–1945". The China Quarterly. 164 (164): 915–942. doi:10.1017/S0305741000019238. JSTOR 655920.
- Hershatter, Gail (2019). Women and China's Revolutions. Rowman & Littlefield. ISBN 978-1-4422-1568-9.
- Lary, Diana (2010). The Chinese People at War. doi:10.1017/CBO9780511761898. ISBN 978-0-521-19506-5.
- Li, Danke (2010). Echoes of Chongqing: Women in Wartime China. University of Illinois Press. ISBN 978-0-252-03489-3. JSTOR 10.5406/j.ctt1xcmn9.
- Mitter, Rana (2013). China's War with Japan, 1937–1945: The Struggle for Survival. Penguin Books Limited. ISBN 978-1-84614-804-0.
- Muscolino, Micah S. (2014). The Ecology of War in China. doi:10.1017/CBO9781107785274. ISBN 978-1-107-78527-4.
- Wang, Xian (2025). Gendered Memories: An Imaginary Museum for Ding Ling and Chinese Female Revolutionary Martyrs. University of Michigan Press. ISBN 978-0-472-05719-1.
