= Hunan–Hubei–Jiangxi Soviet =

Chinese Soviet and Liberated Zone (c. 1930s)

The Hunan–Hubei–Jiangxi Soviet (Chinese: 湘鄂赣苏维埃; pinyin: Xiāng-È-Gàn Sūwéiāi) was a Comintern and local communist-led liberated zone in the 1930s south of the Yangtze River, comprising parts of counties in what are now the municipal regions of Yueyang in Hunan, Xianning in Hubei and, in Jiangxi, Jiujiang and Yichun. It was a constituent part of the territorially discontiguous and diplomatically unrecognised Chinese Soviet Republic (CSR). Before the declaration of the CSR in November 1931, the liberated zone had been known to Communists as the Hunan-Hubei-Jiangxi (Xiang-E-Gan) Revolutionary Base Area (湘鄂赣革命根据地).

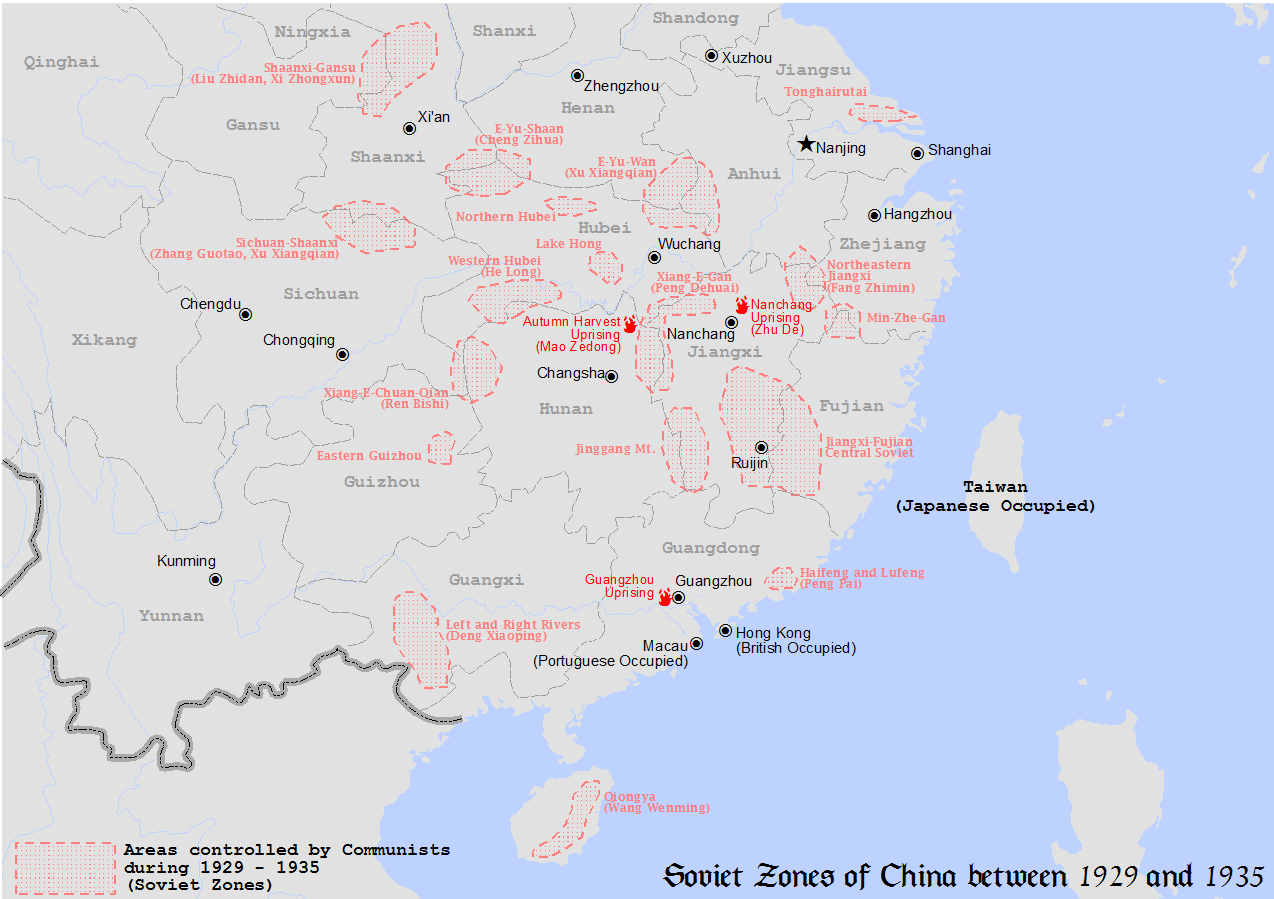
Map showing the communist-controlled Soviet Zones of China between 1929 and 1935.

== Embargo and menace ==
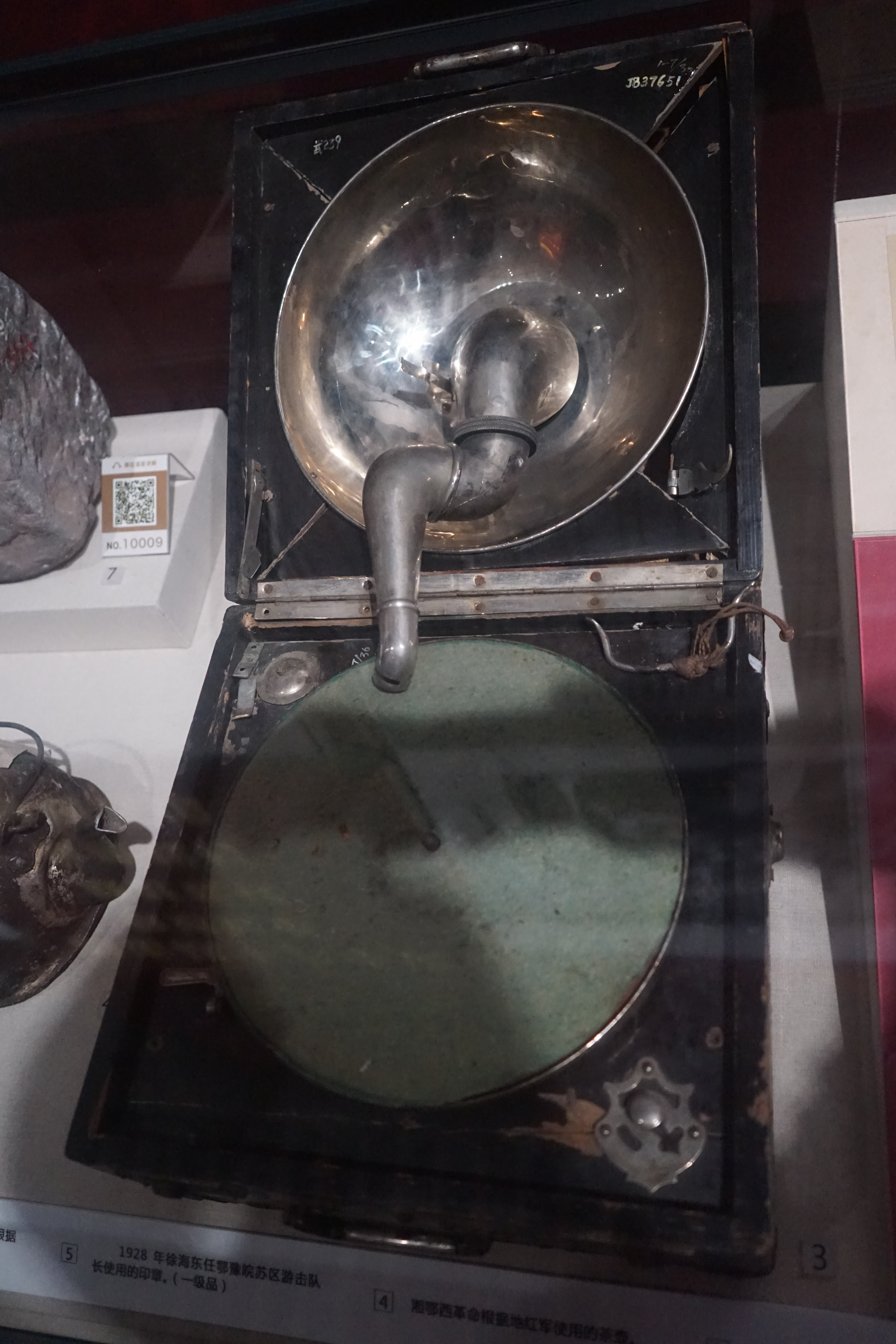
Phonograph used by Red Army at Hunan-Hubei-Jiangxi Revolutionary Base Area

The Right-Kuomintang (Nationalist) Government intended to destroy the Soviet by means of one of its broadly unsuccessful Encirclement campaigns. The Communist response is known as the Counter-Encirclement Campaign at the Hunan–Hubei–Jiangxi Soviet (or, since the action pre-dates the establishment of the CSR, the Counter-Encirclement Campaign at the Hunan-Hubei-Jiangxi Revolutionary Base).

The Hunan–Hubei–Jiangxi Soviet was defended by the Red 16th Army, commanded under Vice Chairman Yang Youlin. The 16th launched a pre-emptive strike on Tongcheng, in Hubei, in December 1930, annihilating an entire regiment of the KMT army just before it could begin the first attack of the campaign. The Government forces had to withdraw temporarily to regroup. The 16th, with help of fraternal CSR Soviets, held off danger to the Hunan–Hubei–Jiangxi Soviet until May 1931.

== Coordinated defense ==
As reinforcement troops from other Nationalist Government regions moved in to avenge the defeat at Tongcheng, it was determined at Red Army central command that a diversionary measure was in order. The forces of the Hunan-Jiangxi Soviet accordingly struck two positions in government-held Hunan, one directly to their west and the other to their south. The gambit foiled the Encirclement Campaign against the Hunan–Hubei–Jiangxi Soviet by depriving it of essential strength.

== See also ==
- Outline of the Chinese Civil War
