= Meiyu =

Meiyu may refer to:

- East Asian rainy season, known in Chinese as Meiyu (梅雨; méiyǔ; "plum rain")
  - Meiyu front, weather front in East Asia and western Pacific
- Eyebrow Talk (眉語; méiyǔ), 1910s Chinese magazine
- Maiyü, also known as Meiyu, township in Zogang County, Tibet, China
- Meiyu, town in Yanyuan County, Sichuan, China

== People ==
- Zhou Meiyu, Chinese nurse
- Liang Meiyu, Chinese field hockey player
- Kong Meiyu, Chinese speed skater
- Hsiao Mei-yu, Taiwanese bicycle racer
