= Soviet Zone =

Soviet Zone can refer to:

- Communist-controlled China (1927–1949), area of China controlled by the Chinese Communist Party prior to the establishment of the People's Republic of China, commonly referred to as the "Soviet Zone", or "Liberated Zone".
- Soviet occupation zone of Germany, area of Nazi Germany occupied by the Soviet Union after World War II
