= Ruijin Massacre =

Massacre in Ruijin county during Chinese Cultural Revolution

Rujin Massacre
- Part of Cultural Revolution in China
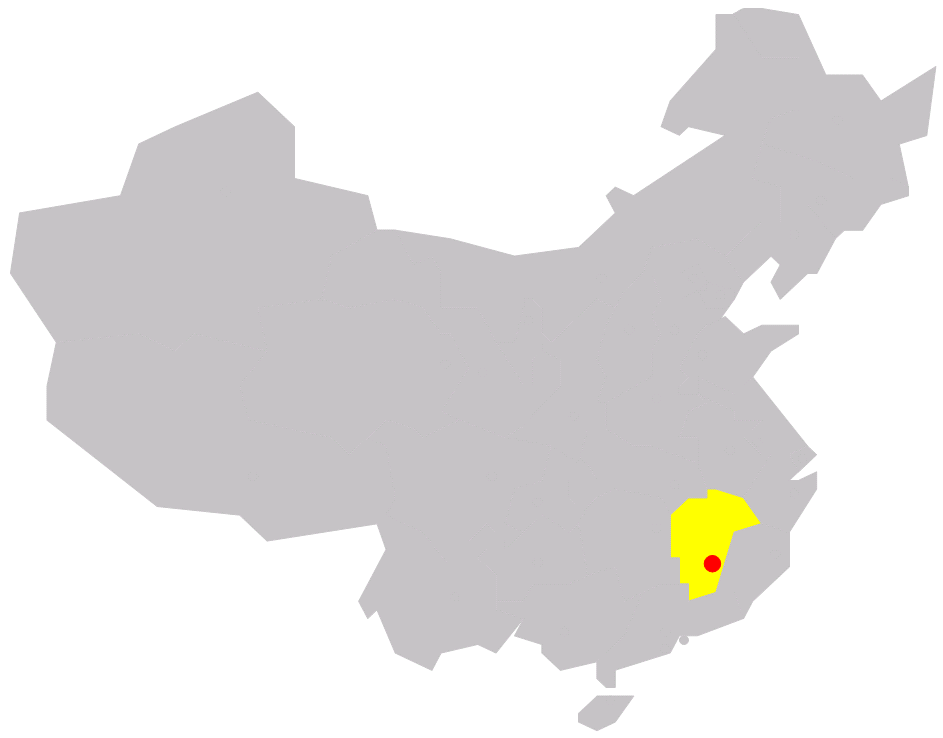
- Ruijin in the People's Republic of China
- Location: Ruijin, Jiangxi Province China
- Date: September 1968–October 1968
- Target: Counter-revolutionaries, "Five Black Categories" (Landlords, wealthy peasants, bad influences/elements and right wingers)
- Attack type: Politicide, Massacre, politically motivated violence
- Deaths: Over 1,000
- Perpetrators: Chinese Communist Party, Cheng Shiqing then Governor of Jiangxi Province
- Motive: Cultural Revolution instigrated by Mao Zedong, resentment of wealthier peasants, capitalists and "traitors"

The Ruijin Massacre (simplified Chinese: 瑞金大屠杀; traditional Chinese: 瑞金大屠殺) was a series of massacres that took place in Ruijin and nearby counties in Jiangxi Province during the Chinese Cultural Revolution. From 23 September to early October, 1968, over 1,000 people were killed in the Ruijin Massacre; specifically, over 300 people were killed in Ruijin County, around 270 were killed in Xingguo County, and over 500 in Yudu County.

== Historical background ==
Ruijin was the capital of the short-lived state Chinese Soviet Republic from 1931 to 1934, the year the Chinese Communist Party (CCP) fled the city and started the famous Long March.

In May 1966, Mao Zedong launched the Cultural Revolution in mainland China. The Ruijin Massacre took place during the nationwide campaign of "Cleansing the Class Ranks". In August 1968, Cheng Shiqing, then provincial secretary of the CCP and governor of Jiangxi Province, launched the "Three Investigations Movement (三查运动/三查運動)" throughout the province, attempting to find out traitors, spies and counter-revolutionaries. The movement caused the deaths of over 10,000 people in total, including 5,000 who were forced to commit suicide.

On September 22, 1968, officials from local people's communes were called to a meeting in Ruijin, during which the importance of carrying out the "Three Investigations Movement" was emphasized. The meeting also stressed the need of making some "achievements" to celebrate the upcoming National Day of the China on October 1. After the meeting, officials in local communes and production brigades began to kill people at will, without the requirement of launching investigations, collecting evidence, or receiving approvals.

== The massacre ==
The Ruijin massacres were conducted by people's communes and production brigades in Ruijin, together with local militia, targeting members of the Five Black Categories as well as their relatives.

From 23 September to early October, 1968, over 1,000 people were killed: over 300 people were killed in Ruijin County, around 270 were killed in Xingguo County, and over 500 in Yudu County. The oldest victim was 80 years old, while the youngest was 11. The methods of torture and slaughter included shooting with guns, stoning, beating with clubs, stabbing with knives, pushing over cliffs, and so on.

From late September to early October 1968, the situation had grown out of control, forcing the local revolutionary committees to take multiple interventions which gradually ended the massacre.

== See also ==
- Mass killings under communist regimes
- List of massacres in China
- Cleansing the Class Ranks
