= Yang Youlin =

Chinese Communist revolutionary

- 杨幼麟
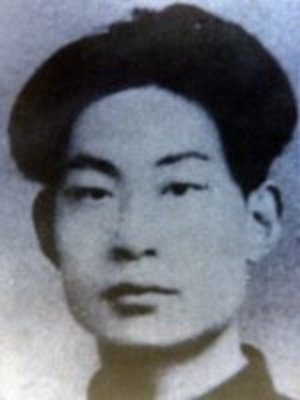
- Yang Youlin
- Born: 1899; Hami, Xinjiang, Qing dynasty
- Died: 1935 (Age 36); Ruijin, Jiangxi Province, Republic of China
- Cause of death: Executed by the Nationalist government
- Education: Hunan Self-Study University; Moscow Sun Yat-sen University
- Alma mater: Moscow Sun Yat-sen University
- Occupation: Vice Chairman of the Hunan Hubei Jiangxi Provincial Soviet Government
- Political party: Chinese Communist Party
- Opponent: Nationalist government
- Spouse: Li Huaying (李华英)
- Children: Yang Yingpeng
- Father: Yang Xianglin
- Relatives: Yang Zailin - Younger brother Yang Kaihui - 2nd Cousin
- Military career
- Allegiance: Communist China
- Branch: Chinese Red Army
- Service years: 1925–1935
- Commands: 16th Red Army
- Conflict: Chinese Civil War; Attack on Changsha, 1930; 1st Encirclement Campaign against the Hunan-Hubei-Jiangxi Soviet; 4th Encirclement Campaign; 5th Encirclement Campaign

Chinese name
- Traditional Chinese: 杨幼麟
- Simplified Chinese: 杨幼麟
- Postal: Yang Yu-lin
Transcriptions
Standard Mandarin
- Hanyu Pinyin: Yáng Yòulín
- Wade–Giles: Yang^{4} Yu^{4}-lin^{2}
- Tongyong Pinyin: Yáng Yòulín

Yang Youlin (Chinese: 杨幼麟, Youlin Yang, 1899–1935), nickname Shifu (Chinese: 石夫), was a Chinese politician and a member of the Chinese Communist Party (CCP), being the Vice Chairman and Acting Chairman of the Hunan Hubei Jiangxi Soviet Provincial Government before he was captured and executed in 1935 by the Nationalist government. He was formerly a schoolteacher before joining the CCP in 1925. As a member of the CCP, he was responsible for managing education affairs, teaching the ideals of the communist revolution to his fellow Chinese. Youlin was harassed and was forced to flee to the Soviet Union in 1927, returning in 1929 after studying in Moscow. He became Vice Chairman of the Hunan Hubei Jiangxi Soviet Provincial Government and assumed command of the 16th Army in 1930, and led the Chinese Red Army offensive on Changsha in that year. He fought against the fifth encirclement campaign against the Jiangxi Soviet, and was captured by the National Revolutionary Army and executed in 1935.

== Biography ==
=== Early life ===
Yang Youlin was born in Hami in the year 1899. His father, Yang Xianglin, was a governmental officer working in Xinjiang Province in the Qing Army.

In 1921, Youlin attended the Hunan Self-Study University. He would become a teacher at Changsha Yueyun Middle School (Chinese: 岳云中学). In the spring of 1925, he discovered that Mao Zedong had returned to Shaoshan from Shanghai to recover from his illness and initiate a peasant uprising, prompting him to call his companions to Shaoshan to seek Mao Zedong's counsel in person. In September 1925, he became a member of the Chinese Communist Party (CCP) in Shaoshan, and attended the Shaoshan Revenge Meeting (Chinese: 韶山区农民雪耻会), serving as Director of School Affairs.

=== Military and political career ===
On March 18, 1926, Youlin was instrumental in the organization of peoples in protesting the warlord society of China. Between 1926 and 1927, he continued his work for the CCP in China up until the May 28th Incident, where he organized his party committee in Wuhan and fled to the Soviet Union for refuge against the Nationalist government. His family, which could not flee, was brutally persecuted by the Nationalist government, with many members being executed. In the Soviet Union, he attended the Moscow Sun Yat-sen University until the summer of 1929, when he returned to China.

Upon his return, he advocated for an armed uprising against the Nationalist government, and in 1930 he participated in the Red Army attack on Changsha. After the CCP abandoned Changsha in 1931, Yang Youlin continued his work as the Vice Chairman of the Hunan-Hubei-Jiangxi Soviet Government's Acting Chairman and Vice Chairman.

=== Death ===
In October 1933, the Kuomintang launched the fifth encirclement campaign against the Jiangxi Soviet, trapping most of the Red Army under siege. He and his troops attempted to break out, but their efforts were unsuccessful, and he suffered a serious illness due to pneumonia, which prevented him from accompanying his troops on the Long March. In 1935, he was arrested by the Nationalist government and executed.
