= Tongcheng County =

Tongcheng County 通城县 Tungcheng
- County
- Location of the seat in Hubei
- Coordinates: 29°14′43″N 113°49′01″E
- Country: People's Republic of China
- Province: Hubei
- Prefecture-level city: Xianning
- Time zone: UTC+8 (China Standard)
- Website: www.zgtc.gov.cn/zw/

Tongcheng (Chinese: 通城; pinyin: Tōngchéng) is the governmental seat and the name of a county in Xianning City, Hubei, People's Republic of China, bordering the provinces of Jiangxi (to the east) and Hunan (to the south and west).

== History ==
The Red 16th Army, stationed at the Hunan-Hubei-Jiangxi Soviet annihilated an entire regiment of the Nationalist army here in December 1930, disrupting its planned siege of the Red base.

== Administration ==
Nine towns:

- Junshui (隽水镇), Maishi (麦市镇), Tanghu (塘湖镇), Guandao (关刀镇), Shadui (沙堆镇), Wuli (五里镇), Shinan (石南镇), Beigang (北港镇), Magang (马港镇)

Two townships:

- Sizhuang Township (四庄乡), Daping Township (大坪乡)

== Climate ==
Climate data for Tongcheng, elevation 146 m (479 ft), (1991–2020 normals, extremes 1981–2010)
Month	Jan	Feb	Mar	Apr	May	Jun	Jul	Aug	Sep	Oct	Nov	Dec	Year
Record high °C (°F)	24.6 (76.3)	29.3 (84.7)	32.7 (90.9)	34.8 (94.6)	36.0 (96.8)	37.2 (99.0)	40.1 (104.2)	40.3 (104.5)	38.0 (100.4)	35.9 (96.6)	31.5 (88.7)	24.4 (75.9)	40.3 (104.5)
Mean daily maximum °C (°F)	9.0 (48.2)	12.2 (54.0)	16.6 (61.9)	23.1 (73.6)	27.5 (81.5)	30.3 (86.5)	33.5 (92.3)	33.1 (91.6)	29.3 (84.7)	23.9 (75.0)	18.0 (64.4)	11.9 (53.4)	22.4 (72.3)
Daily mean °C (°F)	4.7 (40.5)	7.4 (45.3)	11.6 (52.9)	17.7 (63.9)	22.4 (72.3)	25.7 (78.3)	28.7 (83.7)	28.0 (82.4)	24.0 (75.2)	18.4 (65.1)	12.4 (54.3)	6.8 (44.2)	17.3 (63.2)
Mean daily minimum °C (°F)	1.6 (34.9)	4.0 (39.2)	7.9 (46.2)	13.5 (56.3)	18.3 (64.9)	22.1 (71.8)	24.9 (76.8)	24.3 (75.7)	20.1 (68.2)	14.4 (57.9)	8.4 (47.1)	3.2 (37.8)	13.6 (56.4)
Record low °C (°F)	−6.6 (20.1)	−6.7 (19.9)	−2.6 (27.3)	0.9 (33.6)	8.5 (47.3)	12.3 (54.1)	18.4 (65.1)	17.2 (63.0)	9.1 (48.4)	1.1 (34.0)	−3.1 (26.4)	−9.9 (14.2)	−9.9 (14.2)
Average precipitation mm (inches)	77.2 (3.04)	88.5 (3.48)	154.2 (6.07)	208.4 (8.20)	230.5 (9.07)	276.0 (10.87)	231.4 (9.11)	136.8 (5.39)	86.9 (3.42)	70.9 (2.79)	80.0 (3.15)	47.4 (1.87)	1,688.2 (66.46)
Average precipitation days (≥ 0.1 mm)	13.0	12.8	16.7	15.7	15.1	14.7	13.4	12.4	9.1	9.6	10.3	9.6	152.4
Average snowy days	4.3	2.2	0.5	0	0	0	0	0	0	0	0.1	1.1	8.2
Average relative humidity (%)	79	79	79	77	78	82	78	79	79	77	78	76	78
Mean monthly sunshine hours	80.0	80.3	99.4	124.9	146.3	140.8	208.5	203.5	161.3	143.7	125.2	114.0	1,627.9
Percentage possible sunshine	25	25	27	32	35	34	49	50	44	41	39	36	36
Source: China Meteorological Administration
