= Flag of the Chinese Soviet Republic =

Chinese Soviet Republic
- Use: Civil and state flag
- Proportion: 25:18
- Adopted: 1934
- Design: A red flag with the national emblem in the center.
- Military flag of the Chinese Soviet Republic
- Proportion: 25:18
- Adopted: 1934
- Design: The top left corner features a red five-pointed star, and the center of the flag displays a hammer and sickle.

The national flag of the Chinese Soviet Republic was a red flag with the national emblem in the center, with a ratio of 25:18.

== History ==
The earliest description of the national flag of the Chinese Soviet Republic appeared in the draft constitution of the Chinese Soviet Republic in January 1934, in which Article 77 stipulated that the national flag was a red flag with the national emblem.

Article 76: The emblem of the Chinese Soviet Republic shall be a sphere with a crossed hammer and sickle inserted on it, with ears of grain placed below and on either side of the earth. Above the earth and on the five-pointed star shall be the inscription "Chinese Soviet Republic", and above that, " Workers of the world and oppressed nations, unite!" Article 77: The national flag is a red flag with the national emblem added on top.

When the 2nd National Congress of the Chinese Soviet Republic was held in 1934, it adopted the "Decision of the Second National Congress of Soviets on the National Emblem, National Flag, and Military Flag":

(I) The emblem of the Chinese Soviet Republic was as follows: a crossed sickle and hammer were placed on a globe, with ears of grain on the right and ears of wheat on the left, positioned below and to the sides of the globe. A five-pointed star was placed above the globe. The inscription read "Chinese Soviet Republic" above the globe, and above that, "Workers of the world and oppressed nations, unite!" The globe was white with blue outlines of latitude and longitude. The sickle and hammer on the globe were black, and the five-pointed star was yellow.

(ii) The national flag is red, five feet wide and three feet six inches high, with the national emblem on it, and the flag handle is white.

(iii) The military flag has a red background, is five feet wide and three feet six inches high, with a yellow crossed sickle and hammer in the center and a yellow five-pointed star in the upper right corner. The flag handle is white.

== Military flag ==
The early Red Army used a red flag with a white star in the center and a black hammer and sickle (sometimes made into a hammer and sickle). The number was written on a white banner on the left. After the Second National Congress of Soviets passed the "Decision on the National Emblem, National Flag and Military Flag", the military flag with a yellow hammer and sickle in the center and a five-pointed star in the upper right corner was adopted. Although legally this flag is the military flag of the Chinese Soviet Republic, it basically represents the national flag of the Chinese Soviet Republic.

National flag of the Chinese Soviet Republic	Military flag of the Chinese Soviet Republic	Flags of the Chinese Workers' and Peasants' Red Army (1931 edition): Infantry Flag, Cavalry Flag, Artillery Flag, Engineer Flag, Supply Troops Flag, Medical Troops Flag (from left to right)	Chinese Workers' and Peasants' Red Army Flag

== Other Soviet Areas ==
Qiongya Soviet Government	Jiangxi Soviet	Central Soviet Area
