= Hunan Self-Study University =

Short- lived Educational Organization in Hunan

The Hunan Self-Study University (simplified Chinese:湖南自修大学; traditional Chinese: 湖南自脩大學; pinyin:Húnán zì xiū dàxué) was an educational organization which operated on the grounds of the Yuelu Academy. It is on the current site of Chuanshan Academy, on Zhongshan East Road in Changsha.

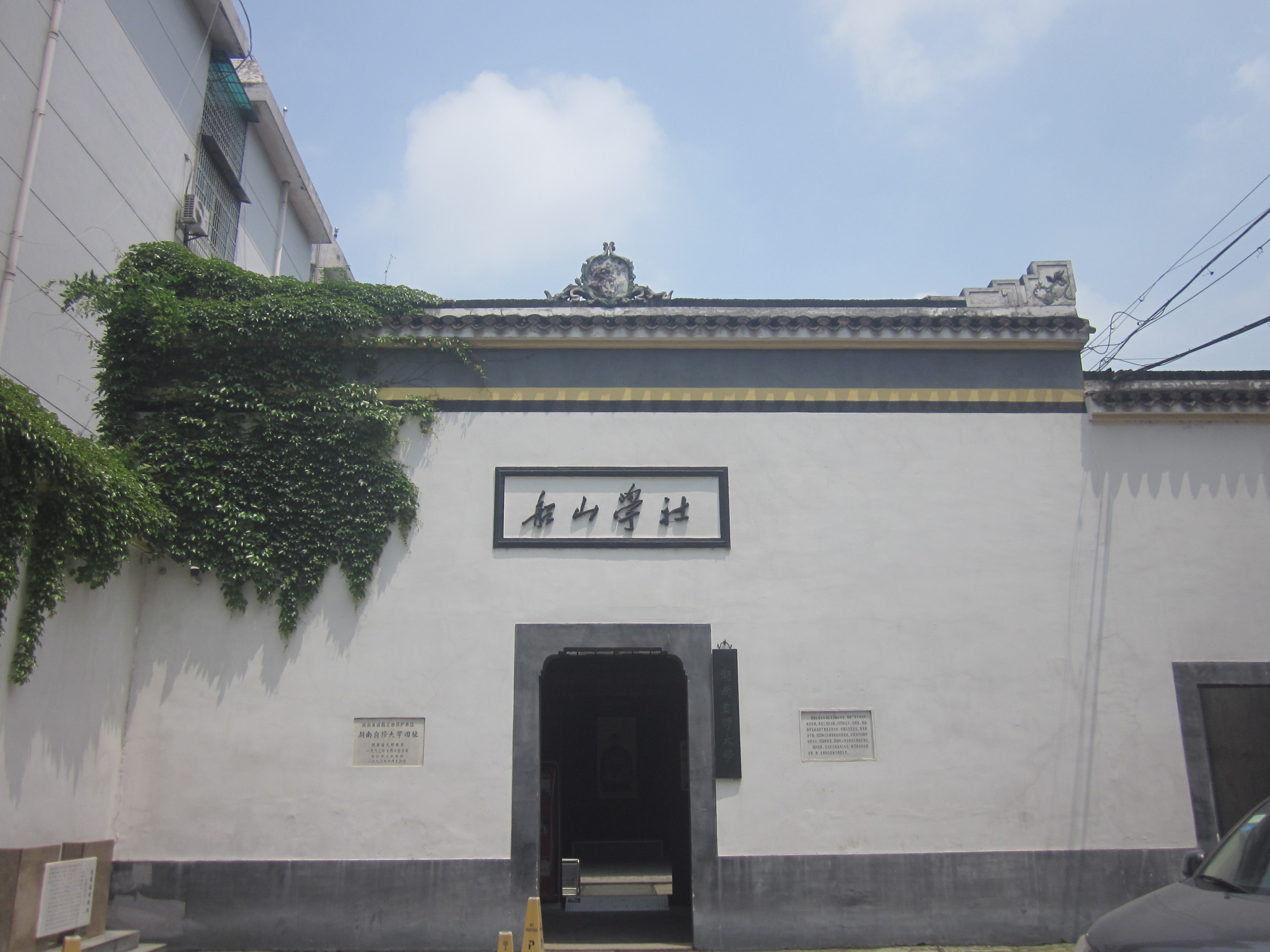
Former Site of Hunan Self-Study University in Changsha, Hunan Province

== History ==
It was created in August 1921 by Mao Zedong due to his frustration with the traditional shuyuan, aiming for a new type of school which would promote the ideas of the Chinese Communist Party. Mao's former teacher and then-Beijing University professor Yang Changji had written an article called On the Necessity of Establishing a Provincial University in Hunan based on the shuyuan model. This encouraged Mao to propose a new model:

I think we should create a new kind of life in Changsha. We should invite comrades to join us and rent a house to establish a self-study university, where we shall practice a communal life. It can also be called the work-study group.

— Mao Zedong, Letter to Zhou Shixhao

In 1922 founding party member and writer Li Da was named the head of the school, and he edited the school's journal, "New Era" (新时代) which documented the school's founding goals and published works by other early Chinese Communists.

The university operated until late 1923, when it was closed by General Zhao Hengti of the National Revolutionary Army on the grounds that it violated a public order. A notable student of this university was Yang Youlin, who became an influential leader in the Chinese Civil War. Other notable students included Li Weihan, Xia Minghan, Yi Lirong, Jiang Mengzhou, Guo Liang, and Mao Zemin.
