= Revolutionary base area =

Maoist military strategy

In Mao Zedong's original formulation of the military strategy of people's war, a revolutionary base area (Chinese: 革命根据地; pinyin: gémìng gēnjùdì), or simply base area, is a local stronghold that the revolutionary force conducting the people's war should attempt to establish, starting from a remote area with mountainous or forested terrain in which its enemy is weak.

== Military ==
This kind of base helps the revolutionary conducting force to exploit the few advantages that a small revolutionary movement has—broad-based popular support, especially in a localized area, can be one of them—against a state power with a large and well-equipped army. To overcome a lack of supplies, revolutionaries in a base area may storm isolated outposts or other vulnerable supply caches controlled by the forces of an opponent.

== Revolutionary base areas in China ==
=== Cultural policies ===
In 1940, the Central Committee of the Chinese Communist Party issued its Instruction on Developing Cultural Movements, instructing that in "every large base area, a complete printing factory should be established. Existing printing factories should strive for improvement and expansion. The construction of a printing factory should be regarded as more important than building an army of ten thousand or even more. It's crucial to organize the distribution of newspapers, periodicals, and books, have specialized transport organizations and protective troops, and consider transporting cultural sustenance as important as transporting clothes and ammunition."

=== Feminist policies ===
In February 1943, the Communist Party issued its Decision of the Central Committee Concerning the Present Direction of Women's Work in Anti-Japanese Base Areas. The Decision contended that efforts to mobilize women had been lacking in "mass perspective" and it was necessary to organize women in cooperative groups to effectively mobilize their labor power. Establishing small cooperative weaving groups outside the home was a significant emphasis.

== See also ==
- Jiangxi Soviet
- Red corridor
- On Protracted War
- Ho Chi Minh trail
- Yan'an Soviet
- Jin-Cha-Ji Border Region
- Communist-controlled China (1927–1949)
