= Outline of the Constitution of the Chinese Soviet Republic =

The Outline of the Constitution of the Chinese Soviet Republic was the constitutional outline of the Chinese Soviet Republic. It consisted of 17 articles and was adopted by the 1st National Congress of the Chinese Soviet on 7 November 1931. It was revised and adopted by the 2nd National Congress of the Chinese Soviet in January 1934. The defects of this constitutional outline were that the content is not complete, the format was not sound, and it simply copied the Soviet constitutional model.

== Content ==
The Outline of the Constitution proposed guaranteeing the democratic dictatorship of workers and peasants, prohibiting counter-revolutionary propaganda and activities, and restricting the political freedom of exploiters, in order to eliminate all feudal remnants, drive out the imperialist powers' influence in China, unify China, systematically restrict the development of capitalism, carry out Soviet economic construction, raise the unity and consciousness of the proletariat, unite the broad masses of poor peasants around it, and consolidate its alliance with the middle peasants, with the aim of transforming into the dictatorship of the proletariat. In terms of political rights, it asserted that warlords, bureaucrats, landlords, capitalists, rich peasants, monks, and all exploiters and counter-revolutionaries had no right to elect representatives, participate in government, or enjoy political freedom. It recognized freedom of marriage and implemented various measures to protect women. In elections, it granted the proletariat special rights and increased the proportion of proletarian representatives.

Economically, it guaranteed the interests of workers and peasants, restricted the development of capitalism, and claimed to further liberate the working masses from capitalist exploitation, leading them towards the socialist system; it advocated confiscating all land belonging to the landlord class and distributing it to hired laborers, poor peasants, and middle peasants, with the goal of nationalizing land. In terms of policy, all exorbitant taxes and levies imposed during the counter-revolutionary era were abolished, a unified progressive tax was levied, and all sabotage plots by domestic and foreign capitalists were strictly prohibited. Economic policies that benefited and were understood by the workers and peasants, and were geared towards socialism, were adopted. Regarding national rights, the Chinese Soviet government recognized the right of self-determination of ethnic minorities within China, continuing this recognition until each weaker ethnic group had the right to secede from China and establish its own independent state . The Mongols, Hui, Tibetans, Miao, Li, Koreans, and others residing in Chinese territories had the full right to self-determination: to join or secede from the Chinese Soviet Federation, or to establish their own autonomous regions. The Chinese Soviet government was now striving to help these weaker ethnic groups escape the oppressive rule of imperialism, Kuomintang warlords, princes, lamas, and local chieftains, and achieve complete autonomy. The Soviet government also aimed to develop their own national cultures and languages among these ethnic groups. In foreign policy, all political and economic privileges of imperialism in China were not recognized, all unequal treaties concluded with the counter-revolutionary government were declared invalid, and all foreign debts of the counter-revolutionary government were denied.

== Basic tasks ==
The Constitutional Outline represents the basic tasks that the Chinese Soviet Republic aims to achieve in China, mainly including:

- To ensure the regime of the workers' and peasants' democratic dictatorship in the Soviet areas and to achieve his victory throughout China.
- The Chinese Soviet regime established a democratic dictatorship of workers and peasants.
- All workers, peasants, Red soldiers, and all toiling people have the right to elect representatives to take control of the government.
- Workers, peasants, Red soldiers, and all working people and their families are citizens of the Soviet Republic.
- Labor laws were enacted, an eight-hour workday was declared, minimum wage standards were set, and a social insurance system and national unemployment benefits were established.
- To realize the state ownership of land.
- Overthrow the unequal treaties signed with foreign imperialist powers.
- We must do our utmost to develop and safeguard the victory of the workers' and peasants' revolution in China, and the right to participate in the revolutionary war belongs solely to the working people, peasants, and laborers.
- Guarantee workers, peasants, and laborers the freedom of speech, publication, assembly, and association.
- Guarantee that workers, peasants and laborers have genuine freedom of religion and implement the principle of absolute separation of church and state .
- It guarantees the complete liberation of women, recognizes freedom of marriage, and implements various measures to protect women.
- Guarantee the right of workers, peasants and laborers to receive education, and implement completely free universal education .
- The right of ethnic minorities within China to self-determination is recognized, and this right will continue until each minor ethnic group has the right to secede from China and establish its own independent state. The Mongols, Hui, Tibetans, Miao, Li, Koreans, and others residing in Chinese territory have the full right to self-determination; to join or secede from the Chinese Soviet Federation, or to establish their own autonomous regions. The Chinese Soviet regime must now strive to help these minor ethnic groups escape the oppressive rule of imperialism, Kuomintang warlords, princes, lamas, and local chieftains, and achieve complete autonomy. Furthermore, the Soviet regime must promote the development of their own national cultures and languages among these ethnic groups.
- The Chinese Soviet regime granted refuge in Soviet areas to all Chinese nationals and revolutionary fighters around the world who were persecuted by reactionary rule because of their revolutionary actions, and helped and led them to regain their fighting strength until the victory of the revolution was achieved.
- The Soviet Union was a strong ally of the Chinese Soviet Republic.

== See also ==
- Constitutional history of China
