= Communist-controlled China (1927–1949) =

Territories of China controlled by the Communist Party during the civil war

Soviet Zone (1927–1937) 蘇區 Anti-Japanese Base Areas (1937–1946) 抗日根據地 Liberated Zone (1946–1949) 解放區
- 1927–1949
- Flag of the Chinese Red Army; Left: 1928–1934 and Right: 1934–1937
- Motto: "Proletarians and oppressed peoples of the world, unite!" (Chinese: 全世界無產階級和被壓迫的民族聯合起來！)
- Anthem: "The Internationale" (Chinese: 國際歌) (Note: Chinese: 國際歌; pinyin: Guójìgē)
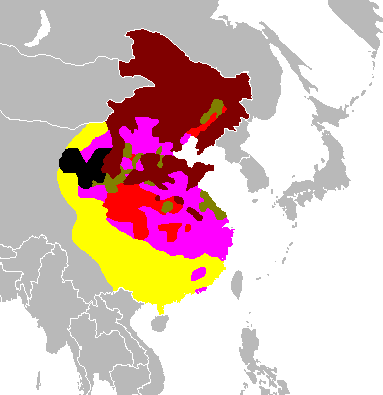
- Map showing the Communist-controlled China 1934 to 1949: CCP in 1934–1945 CCP expansion in 1945-mid 1946 CCP expansion in mid 1946-mid 1947 CCP expansion in mid 1947-mid 1948 CCP expansion in mid 1948-mid 1949 the CCP's final expansion in mid 1949 – September 1949
- Status: Unrecognized proto-state during the Chinese Civil War
- Capital: Jinggangshan (1927–30); Ruijin (1931–34); Zhidan (1935); Yan'an (1936–47); Xibaipo (1948–49); Peiping (1949)
- Official languages: Standard Chinese
- Demonym: Chinese
- Government: Socialist republic
- Historical era: Chinese Civil War; Cold War (from 1947)
  - Nanchang Uprising: 1 August 1927
  - Chinese Soviet Republic: 7 November 1931
  - Shaan-Gan-Ning Border Region: 6 September 1937
  - Second Sino-Japanese War: 22 September 1937–2 September 1945
  - Nationalists take Yan'an: 19 March 1947
  - Pingjin campaign: 31 January 1949
  - Communist capture of Nanjing: 23 April 1949
  - People's Republic of China established: 1 October 1949
Preceded by
Republic of China
Manchukuo
Mengjiang
Wang Jingwei regime
Kwantung
Soviet occupation of Manchuria
Succeeded by
People's Republic of China
- Today part of: China

Revolutionary Base Area of the Chinese Communist Party
- Traditional Chinese: 中國共產黨革命根據地
- Simplified Chinese: 中国共产党革命根据地
Transcriptions
Standard Mandarin
- Hanyu Pinyin: Zhōngguó Gòngchǎndǎng Gémìng Gēnjùdì
- Gwoyeu Romatzyh: Jonggwo Gonqchaandaang Germinq Genjiuhdih
- Wade–Giles: Chung-kuo Kung-ch'an-tang Ko-ming Ken-chü-ti

Soviet Zone
- Traditional Chinese: 蘇區
- Simplified Chinese: 苏区
Transcriptions
Standard Mandarin
- Hanyu Pinyin: Sūqū
- Gwoyeu Romatzyh: Suchiu
- Wade–Giles: Su-ch'ü

Liberated Zone
- Traditional Chinese: 解放區
- Simplified Chinese: 解放区
Transcriptions
Standard Mandarin
- Hanyu Pinyin: Jiěfàngqū
- Gwoyeu Romatzyh: Jieefanqchiu
- Wade–Giles: Chieh-fang-ch'ü

The Chinese Communist Party (CCP) had sphere of influence within the Republic of China from 1927 to 1949 during the Chinese Civil War, collectively called revolutionary base areas. They were also known as the Soviet Zone from 1927 to 1937 during the early stages of the Chinese Civil War, the Anti-Japanese Base Areas during the Second Sino-Japanese War, and the Liberated Zone during the final Stages of the Civil War from 1946 until the founding of the People's Republic of China in 1949.

There were six soviet areas from 1927 to 1933: the Jinggang Mountains, the Central Soviet in Eastern Jiangxi on the border of Fujian, the Eyuwan Soviet, Xiangexi (West Hubei and Hunan), and Xianggan (Hunan-Jiangxi). The first soviet was the Hailufeng Soviet created in 1927. The Central Soviet was the main base of the CCP where its leader Mao Zedong issued a directive on 1 September 1931 for the Central Soviet to mass mobilize the region as a base area. As problems occurred over being able to control territories outside the Central Soviet, by 1933 a full transfer of CCP forces to the Central Soviet was achieved. In 1931, the disconnected areas controlled by the CCP were declared the Chinese Soviet Republic (CSR).

Somewhat separately from the Chinese Soviets, there was a pro-Soviet Union protectorate ruled by Sheng Shicai following the Soviet invasion of Xinjiang. Sheng switched between alliance and hostility to the CCP in the east.

Upon the intervention of the Soviet Union against Japan in World War II in 1945, USSR forces invaded the Japanese client state of Manchukuo. Mao Zedong in April and May 1945 had planned to mobilize 150,000 to 250,000 soldiers from across China to work with forces of the Soviet Union in capturing Manchuria. After the end of the war, the CCP controlled one-third of the territory of China. From 1945 to 1949, in the Chinese Communist Revolution, the CCP captured all Chinese territory except for Taiwan and several islands off the coast of Fujian, and established the People's Republic of China that exists today.

== History ==
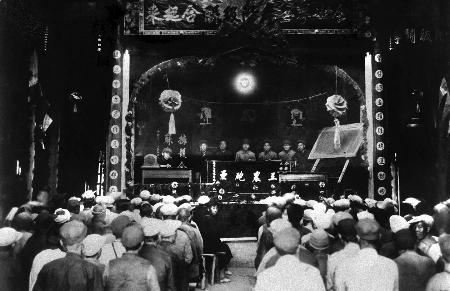
The founding ceremony of the Chinese Soviet Republic on 7 November 1931 in Ruijin, Jiangxi Province.

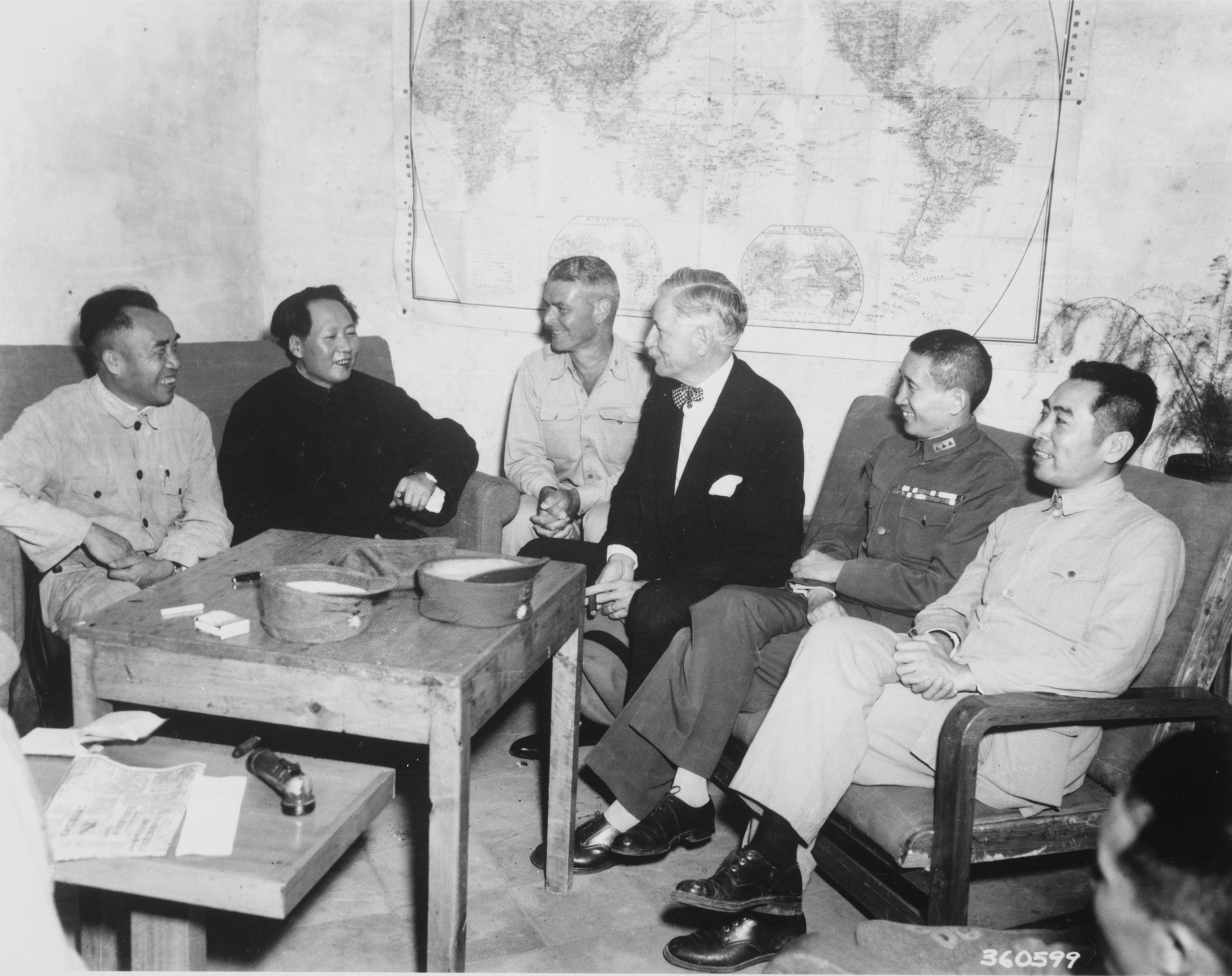
Mao Zedong (second from left in a dark uniform) and Chinese Communist Party (CCP) officials meeting with United States Ambassador to China, Patrick Hurley (at center – in bow tie), at CCP headquarters in Yan'an, 1945.

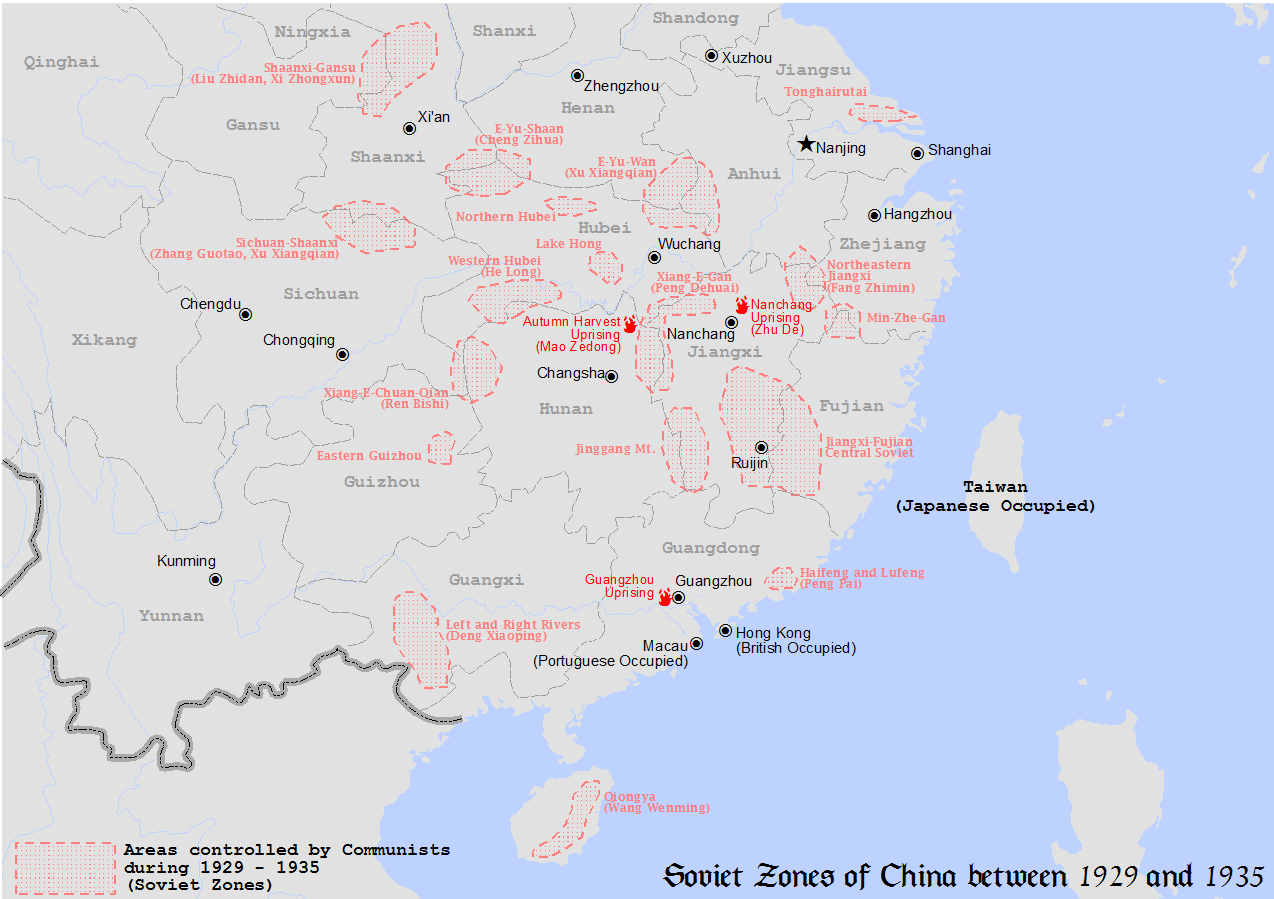
Map showing the CCP-controlled Soviet Zones of China between 1929 and 1935. These areas were re-controlled by the Nationalist government after 1934.

In late 1929, the Fourth Army organized the Gucheng Uprising and the establishment of Soviet administrations, peasant organizations, and militias.

Having defeated three encirclement campaigns by the Kuomintang (KMT) forces, in 1931 the CCP linked the Western Fujian and Southern Jiangxi base areas. In 1931, the CCP decided to consolidate its isolated base areas into a single state, the Chinese Soviet Republic. In November 1931, the CSR was proclaimed in Ruijin, Jiangxi.

With Mao Zedong as both head of state (中央執行委員會主席, "Chairman of the Central Executive Committee") and head of government (人民委員會主席, "Chairman of the Council of People's Commissars"), the Jiangxi Soviet gradually expanded, reaching a peak of more than 30,000 square kilometres and a population that numbered more than three million, covering considerable parts of two provinces (with Tingzhou in Fujian). Furthermore, its economy was doing better than most areas that were under the control of the Chinese warlords. In addition to the militia and guerilla, its regular Chinese Red Army alone already numbered more than 140,000 by the early 1930s, and they were better armed than most Chinese warlords' armies at the time. For example, not only did the Chinese Red Army already have modern communication means such as telephones, telegraphs and radios which most Chinese warlords' armies still lacked, it was already regularly transmitting wireless messages in codes and breaking nationalist codes. Only Chiang Kai-shek's army could match this formidable communist force.

The Nationalist government, led by Chiang Kai-shek, felt threatened by the Soviet republic and led other Chinese warlords to have the National Revolutionary Army besiege the Soviet Republic repeatedly, launching what Chiang and his fellow nationalists called encirclement campaigns at the time, while the communists called their counterattacks "counter encirclement campaigns". Chiang Kai-shek's first, second and third encirclement campaigns were defeated by the Chinese Red Army led by Mao. However, after the third counter encirclement campaign, Mao was removed from the leadership and replaced by the Chinese communists returning from the Soviet Union such as Wang Ming, and the command of the Chinese Red Army was handled by a three-man committee that included Wang Ming's associates Otto Braun, the Comintern military advisor, Bo Gu, and Zhou Enlai. The Jiangxi Soviet thus began its inevitable rapid downfall under their policy of extreme leftism and incompetent military command, though the new leadership could not immediately rid itself of Mao's influence which prevailed during the fourth encirclement campaign, and thus saved the communists temporarily. However, as a result of the complete dominance the new communist leadership achieved after the fourth counter encirclement campaign, the Red Army was nearly halved, with most its equipment lost during Chiang's fifth encirclement campaign, started in 1933 and orchestrated by his German advisors, that involved the systematic encirclement of the Jiangxi Soviet region with fortified blockhouses. This method proved to be very effective. In an effort to break the blockade, the Red Army under the orders of the three man committee besieged the forts many times but suffered heavy casualties with little success, resulting in the Jiangxi Soviet shrinking significantly in size due to the Chinese Red Army's disastrous manpower and material losses.

On 10 October 1934, the three-man committee communist leadership formally issued the order of the general retreat, and on 16 October 1934, the Chinese Red Army begun what was later known as the Long March, fully abandoning the Jiangxi Soviet. 17 days after the main communist force had already left its base, the nationalists were finally aware that the enemy had escaped after reaching the empty city of Ruijin on 5 November 1934. Contrary to the common erroneous belief, the original destination was He Long's communist base in Hubei, and the final destination Yan'an was not decided on until much later during the Long March, well after the rise of Mao Zedong. To avoid panic, the goal was kept a secret from most people, including Mao Zedong, and the public was told that only a portion of the Chinese Red Army would be engaged in mobile warfare to defeat nationalist forces, and thus this part of the army would be renamed as the "Field Army".

By the fall of 1934, the CCP faced total annihilation. This situation had already convinced Mao Zedong and his supporters to believe that the communists should abandon their bases in the Jiangxi Soviet republic. However, the three man committee refused to accept the inevitable failure and still daydreamed of defeating the victorious nationalist forces. The three man committee devised a plan of diversions, and then a regroup after a temporary retreat. Once the regroup was complete, a counterattack would be launched in conjunction with the earlier diversion forces, driving the enemy out of the Jiangxi Soviet.

The first movements of the retreating diversion were undertaken by Fang Zhimin. Fang Zhimin and his deputy, Xun Weizhou, were first to break through Kuomintang lines in June, followed by Xiao Ke in August. These movements surprised the Kuomintang, who were numerically superior to the communists at the time and did not expect an attack on their fortified perimeter. However, things did not turn out as the communists had hoped: Fang Zhimin's force was crushed after its initial success, and with Xun Weizhou killed in action, nearly every commander in this force was wounded and captured alive, including Fang Zhimin himself, and all were executed later by the nationalists. The only exception was Su Yu, who managed to escape. Xiao Ke fared no better: although his force initially managed to break through and then reached He Long's communist base in Hubei, but even with their combined forces, they were unable to challenge the far superior nationalist force besieging the Jiangxi Soviet, never to return until the establishment of the People's Republic of China 15 years later.

Shortly after the Marco Polo Bridge incident in 1937, the Eighth Route Army advanced into the Japanese rear in North China, establishing the Taihang resistance base area.

On 6 January 1941, the KMT prohibited domestic and foreign aid from entering the Shaanxi-Gansu-Ningxia Border Region and attempted to encircle it. In March 1941, the region repelled the KMT's attack.

From 1942-1944, the CCP instituted the Yan'an Rectification Movement, which sought to eliminate ideological differences among the cadres and intellectuals and to mold them into socialist new men. Following this campaign, the CCP's ideology consolidated around Mao Zedong's thought. The concept of the mass line developed through the movement.

== Economy ==
The Chinese Soviet Republic was funded by taxes on grain, rice, and opium. It also received voluntary contributions from its core political constituency, the peasantry. During the period 1931 to 1934, the CSR issued three series of government bonds to further finance its operations. The CCP also fostered and taxed opium production and dealing to raise funds, selling to Japanese-occupied and KMT-controlled provinces. In some areas, 40 percent of the CCP's revenue was derived from opium sales.

On 1 April 1938, the Shaanxi-Gansu-Ningxia Border Region Trade Bureau merged with Guanghua Book store into the Guanghua Store. This body handled the border region's foreign and domestic trade.

In February 1943, the CCP issued its Decision of the Central Committee Concerning the Present Direction of Women's Work in Anti-Japanese Base Areas. The Decision contended that efforts to mobilize women had been lacking in "mass perspective" and it was necessary to organize women in cooperative groups to effectively mobilize their labor power. Establishing small cooperative weaving groups outside the home was a significant emphasis.

=== Bank and currency ===
The 1st National Congress of the CSR tasked Mao Zemin with leading the creation of a national bank. On 1 February 1932, the Chinese Soviet Republic National Bank was established, with Mao Zemin as president. The CSR Central Mint issued three kinds of currency, including the paper bill, the copper coin, and the silver dollar. In 1935, the bank moved with the Central Red Army to Shaanxi and later that year it merged with the Shaanxi-Gansu-Shanxi Bank to form the Northwest Branch of the National Bank of the Chinese Soviet Republic, and then in July 1937 renamed the Shaanxi-Gansu-Ningxia Border Region Bank.

In addition to currency, "red certificates" such as grain coupons, meal tickets, fodder tickets, and firewood tickets were sometimes used.

In an effort to sabotage the economy, Japanese forces forged local currency and Nationalist government currency and circulated them in the Shanxi-Chahar-Hebei Border region. The Border Region Bank established currency comparison offices in each county and district to oppose the Japanese counterfeit effort.

==== Banknotes ====
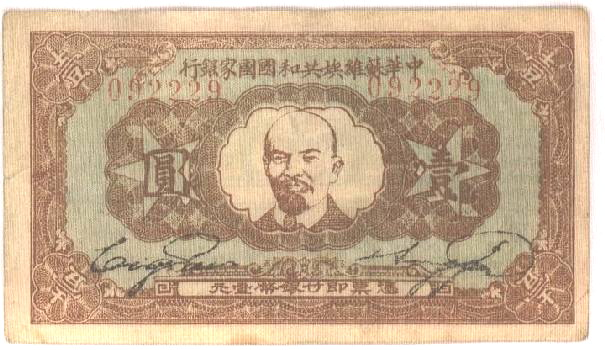
One-yuan bill with Vladimir Lenin's image in the centre.

The Central Mint briefly issued both the paper bills and copper coins, but neither circulated for long, primarily because the currency could not be used in the rest of China.

The paper bill had "Chinese Soviet Republic" (中華蘇維埃共和國) printed on the bill in traditional Chinese characters, with a picture of Vladimir Lenin.

==== Copper coin ====
Like the paper bill, the copper coins issued by the Central Mint also had "Chinese Soviet Republic" (中華蘇維埃共和國) in traditional Chinese characters engraved, and due to the fact that coins last longer than paper bills, these coins were issued and circulated in much greater numbers. However, these coins are currently rarer than the paper bill, mainly because the copper used was in need of cartridges, so these copper coins were recalled and replaced by silver dollars.

==== Silver dollar ====
The largest and most predominant currency produced by the Central Mint was the silver dollar. Unlike the paper bills and the copper coins, the silver dollars had no Communist symbols and instead, they were the direct copy of other silver dollars produced by other mints in China, including the most popular Chinese silver dollar with Yuan Shikai's head engraved, and the eagle silver dollar of the Mexican peso. This and the fact that the coin was made of the precious metal silver, enabled them to be circulated in the rest of China and thus was the trade currency of choice.

When the Chinese Red Army's First Front began their Long March in October 1934, the Communist bank was part of the retreating force, with 14 bank employees, over a hundred coolies and a company of soldiers escorting them while they carried all of the money and mint machinery. One of the important tasks of the bank during the Long March whenever the Chinese Red Army stayed in a place for longer than a day was to tell the local population to exchange any Communist paper bills and copper coins to goods and currency used in nationalist controlled regions, so that the local population would not be persecuted by the pursuing nationalists after the Communists had left. After the Zunyi Conference, it was decided that carrying the entire bank on the march was not practical, so on 29 January 1935, at Earth Town (Tucheng, 土城), the bank employees burned all Communist paper bills and mint machinery under order. By the time the Long March had concluded in October 1935, only 8 out of the 14 original employees survived; the other 6 had died along the way.

=== Publishing ===
The Chinese Civil War resulted in CCP printing generally operating covertly and raw materials were often difficult to acquire. As a result, its printing practices incorporated inexpensive and outdated methods and materials and techniques, including engraving printing, wax paper mimeograph, and lithography.

On 11 December 1931, the Chinese Soviet Republic government established its official newspaper, Red China.

In 1940, the Central Committee of the Chinese Communist Party issued its Instruction on Developing Cultural Movements, instructing that in "every large base area, a complete printing factory should be established. Existing printing factories should strive for improvement and expansion. The construction of a printing factory should be regarded as more important than building an army of ten thousand or even more. It's crucial to organize the distribution of newspapers, periodicals, and books, have specialized transport organizations and protective troops, and consider transporting cultural sustenance as important as transporting clothes and ammunition."

== Culture ==
=== Art and literature ===
In April 1938, the Lu Xun Academy of Art and Literature (Luyi) was founded in Yan'an as a training center for CCP artists.

In 1942, Mao gave the Talks at the Yan'an Forum on Art and Literature which became the basis for CCP cultural policies for the next thirty years. Mao stated that transformations in the social relations of production required development of a new societal consciousness. Mao stated that in addition to reorganizing production, a revolution should create a culture in which the interests and needs of a working culture take priority. In this view, socialist literature should not merely reflect existing culture, but should help culturally produce the consciousness of a new society.

=== Education ===
In areas under the CCP's control, the party operated schools, night schools, and offered literacy classes. The CCP established schools in Yan'an to develop its cadres, including the Central Party School, the Counter-Japanese Military and Political University, the Chinese Women's University, and Lu Xun Academy of Art and Literature.

=== Religious policy ===
From 1928 to 1930, CCP leadership in various base areas issued orders to confiscate religious properties and ban ritual activities. By 1931, this approach had lost support within the party.

The constitution of the Jiangxi Soviet (which existed from 1931 to 1934), endorsed separation of church and state.

On the Long March, the CCP required Red Army soldiers to respect the religions of ethnic groups.

In Yan'an, the CCP's religious policy moved back and forth between more restrictive approaches and more pragmatic or accommodating approaches. As part of the United Front against the Japanese invasion, the CCP adopted tolerant religious policies, particularly with regard to ethnic minority religions and foreign religions.

In early 1940, Mao contended that the CCP could work with some religious people in political action but that it could not approve for their religious doctrines. Hu Qiaomu's "The Anti-Superstition Outline," a 1940 article, described religion and superstition as the antithesis of science and a tool of class exploitation. Hu distinguished between ritual masters and the masses; the power of the former should be defeated, while the latter should be educated and not alienated.

The CCP's first mass campaign against superstition occurred in Yan'an in 1944 and 1945. The campaign sought to eliminate shamanic ritual practices, reform shamans into productive workers, and to promote public health and hygiene.

=== Communications ===
Stencil mimeograph was in widespread use in CCP-controlled governing bodies, newspapers, and army political departments.

=== Model workers ===
The CCP promoted the ideals of model workers in the border regions. This discourse sought to change popular attitudes toward physical laborer from "suffering" to "glory" through emulation of "labor heroes". It sought to frame labor as central to building personal dignity, prosperity in the family, social recognition, and the development of the state.

Beginning in 1943, the CCP publicized the efforts of female model workers in agriculture.

=== Other cultural issues ===
In opposition to traditional arranged marriage customs, the laws of the Jiangxi Soviet protected freely chosen marriage. These laws became a model for marriage laws in other CCP-governed areas. Marriage regulations included the requirement that marriage be "made by both partners freely, independently, and voluntarily" and abolished practices like child brides and early-age marriages, arranged marriages, concubinage, bride-buying, and wife-selling.

== Legal system ==
The CCP Soviets issued laws to control the activities of counter-revolutionaries, and established a soviet-style judicial system. The judicial system was considered impressive even by opponents, such as General Chen Cheng, who spoke of its "scarcity of cases of embezzlement and corruption".

The practice of "people's mediation" arose in rural CCP base areas which lacked developed judicial infrastructure. The practice of people's mediation continued after the 1949 proclamation of the People's Republic of China.

== Healthcare ==
The CCP-controlled areas lacked access to Western-style medical resources. To improve health care, the CCP promoted the integration of traditional Chinese medicine with Western medical science. In Yan'an, mass campaigns sought to "scientize Chinese medicine" and "make Western medicine Chinese." As part of the mobilization effort, the CCP had state doctors lead the "scientizing" process and gave high political status and public honors to some local practitioners of traditional Chinese medicine.

== Flag gallery ==
The flag of the Chinese Communist Party in the Soviet Zone.

Flag of the Chinese Soviet Republic from 1934 to 1937.

Flag of the Chinese Red Army from 1928 to 1934

Flag of the Chinese Red Army from 1934 to 1937

Flag of the Nationalist government of the Republic of China used during the Second Sino-Japanese War from 1937 to 1945.

The flag of the National Revolutionary Army used by the communist New Fourth Army and the Eighth Route Army from 1937 to 1948 during the Second Sino-Japanese War under the Second United Front until 1945.

With no communist or nationalist insignia attached, the plain red flag used from 1946 to 1949 in the zones controlled by the CCP during the Chinese Communist Revolution.

== See also ==
- Outline of the Chinese Civil War
- Timeline of the Chinese Civil War
- Two Chinas
