= Xia Minghan =

Chinese poet and CPC activist (1900–1928)

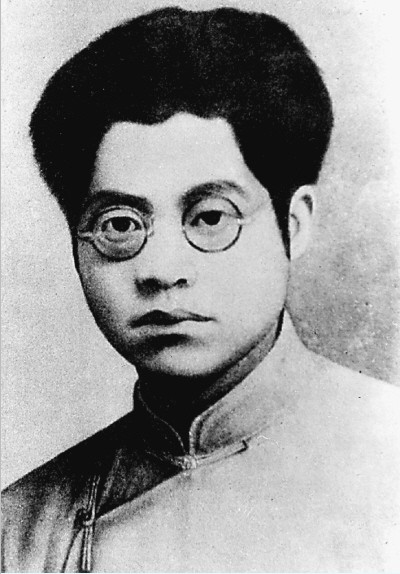

Xia Minghan (Chinese: 夏明翰; 1900 – 30 March 1928) was an early leader of the Chinese Communist Revolution, revolution martyr, and a pioneer of Chinese Communist Party (CCP). He was arrested and executed by the Kuomintang (KMT) in 1928.

== Early life ==
Xia was born in 1900, in Zigui County, Hubei Province to Xia Shaofan (夏绍范) and Lu Yunfeng (陆云凤). He was born in a well-educated family, and his family had been government officials for generations. His father was an officer, but died when Xia was young. Xia joined in founding Xiangnan Student Union and served as the chief secretary, leading a student movement against feudalism and imperialism. In 1920, Xia led the Xiangnan Student Union to fight against General Zhang Jingyao. Xia was a pioneer of the Chinese Communist Party. He studied at the Hunan Self-Study University founded by Mao Zedong. In 1922, Xia was in charge of the Hunan Student Union, leading a strike of rickshaw drivers and a boycott of Japanese products. Xia participated in many other movements such as the Autumn Harvest Uprising. At the beginning of 1928, Xia was sent to work in Hubei as the commissioner of the CCP Hubei District Committee. On March 18, he was betrayed and arrested by the Kuomintang in Wuhan. He was executed two days later.

== Xia Minghan and Mao Zedong ==
In 1917, Xia attended the Third Provincial Public Industrial School in Hunan province. With the help of He Suheng, he went to Changsha, and became a student of Mao Zedong in 1920. He was inducted into the CCP by Mao Zedong and He Shuheng In 1921. In 1927, he was Mao's secretary.

== Revolutionary movement ==
Xia became a committeeman of the Hunan Branch of the CCP in 1924. In 1927, Xia was made a member of the newly formed Hunan Provincial Committee along with Mao Zedong. The committee's two main purposes were to decide who should own land and how the Autumn Harvest Uprising should take place, if at all. The committee met in August 1927. Xia's view on land ownership was that "all land must be confiscated and placed under state control." Xia thought the uprising should take place, but with the military and peasants. In the beginning of 1928, Xia was transferred to Hubei to be the commissioner of the CCP Hubei District Committee. On 28 March 1928, he was arrested by the Kuomintang in Wuhan. He was killed by the KMT two days later.

== Death ==
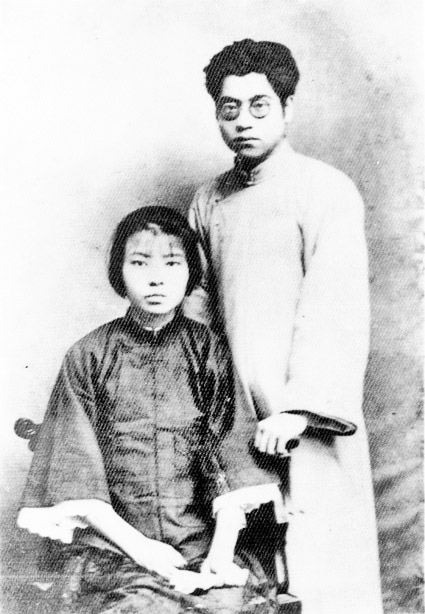
Xia Minghan and wife Zheng Jiajun

Early in 1928, Xia Minghan was transferred to Hubei Province, as a member of Hubei Provincial Committee of CCP, and worked with Guo Liang, the newly appointed secretary of Hubei Provincial Committee. Betrayed by a traitor, on March 18, Xia Minghan was arrested in Wuhan. Two days later, in the morning of March 20, he was escorted to the Wuhan-Yuji execution ground. He was survived by his wife, Zheng Jiajun (郑家钧) and his daughter, Xia Yun (夏芸).

Before his execution, he wrote his last poem:

砍头不要紧，只要主义真，杀了夏明翰，还有后来人。

Translation:

Beheading is nothing to me,

A true communist who'd be.

Though you kill Xia Minghan today,

Numerous will follow my way.

== Legacy ==
On 10 September 2009, he was voted to be one of the 100 heroes who made significant contribution to the establishment of the People's Republic of China.
