= Battle of Yan'an =

1947 battle

- Part of Chinese Civil War
Date	March 19, 1947
Location	Yan'an, Shaanxi, Liberated Zone
Result	Nationalist victory

Belligerents
National Revolutionary Army	Eighth Route Army

Commanders and leaders
(Republic of China (1912–1949)) Hu Zongnan	Peng Dehuai; Xi Zhongxun

Strength
8,100	3,700

Casualties and losses
1,500	unknown

After World War II, Hu Zongnan battled the Chinese Communist Party and in the early stage of the struggle, was successful in the Battle of Yan'an capturing Yan'an, the capital of the communist base in Shaanxi.

Yan'an became the capital of the Chinese Communist Party after the Xi'an Incident in 1936. It became famous in this role during the Sino-Japanese War and throughout World War II, until its capture in 1947. (Before taking over Yan'an, Mao had been based at Bao'an.)

In 1947, there was only minimal communist resistance, as most of the communists had already fled in advance in a strategic withdrawal to lure Hu to the Northwest.

With the outbreak of full-scale civil war between the Communists and Nationalists in early 1947, Xi Zhongxun remained in northwestern China to coordinate the protection and then recapture of the Yan'an Soviet Area. As political commissar, Xi and commander Zhang Zongxun defeated the Nationalists west of Yan'an at the Battle of Xihuachi in March 1947. After Yan'an fell to Hu Zongnan on March 19, 1947, Xi worked on the staff of Peng Dehuai in the battles to retake Yan'an and capture northwest China.

Many high-level Communist leaders were forced to flee their lost capital, and Chiang Kai-shek declared final victory.

KMT forces were only able to hold Yan'an for about a week, and PLA forces rapidly recaptured it. The KMT commitment to conventional-style warfare with a focus on capturing fixed political capitals as objectives, immobilized a large KMT army in the useless Northwest front, making them impotent for the more important mobile campaigns in the East.

The famous picture of Mao, often erroneously attributed to the Long March, is actually of Mao leading the march to Northern Shaanxi in 1947.

== See also ==
- Outline of the Chinese Civil War
- National Revolutionary Army
- History of the People's Liberation Army
