= Chinese Soviet Republic National Bank =

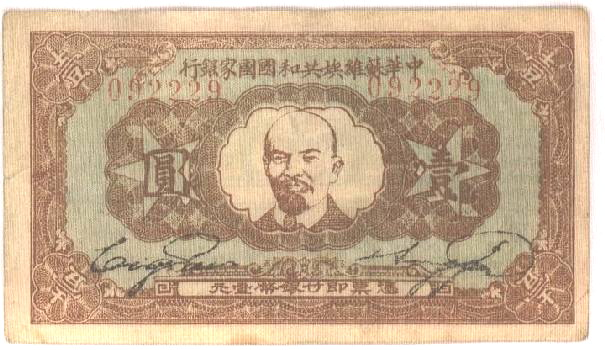
- A one yuan banknote issued by Chinese Soviet Republic National Bank
- Traditional Chinese: 中華蘇維埃共和國國家銀行
- Simplified Chinese: 中华苏维埃共和国国家银行
Transcriptions
Standard Mandarin
- Hanyu Pinyin: Zhōnghuá Sūwéi'āi Gònghéguó Guójiā Yínháng

Chinese Soviet Republic National Bank – Northwest Branch
- Traditional Chinese: 中華蘇維埃共和國國家銀行西北分行
- Simplified Chinese: 中华苏维埃共和国国家银行西北分行
Transcriptions
Standard Mandarin
- Hanyu Pinyin: Zhōnghuá Sūwéi'āi Gònghéguó Guójiā Yínháng Xīběi Fēnháng

Shensi-Kansu-Ninghsia Border Area Bank
- Traditional Chinese: 陝甘寧邊區銀行
- Simplified Chinese: 陕甘宁边区银行
Transcriptions
Standard Mandarin
- Hanyu Pinyin: Shǎn Gān Níng Biānqū Yínháng

The Chinese Soviet Republic National Bank was a bank established by the Chinese Communist Party-controlled Chinese Soviet Republic in the Republic of China. Its governor was Mao Zemin, the younger brother of Mao Zedong. It was involved in providing mortgage, loaning, saving, billing, and government bond services, and was responsible for issuing banknotes and coins in the CCP's controlled territory from 1932 to 1937.

== History ==
The bank was established in Ruijin, Jiangxi, on 1 February 1932. From 1935 to 1936 it was gradually moved to Shanbei along with the Red Army and renamed to the Chinese Soviet Republic National Bank – Northwest Branch. Following the creation of the Second United Front and the dissolution of the CSR in the aftermath of the Xi'an Incident, the bank was renamed to the Shensi-Kansu-Ninghsia Border Area Bank in 1937.
