= Chinese Soviet Republic =

Provisional communist state in China (1931–1937)

Chinese Soviet Republic 中华苏维埃共和国 (Chinese) Zhōnghuá Sūwéi'āi Gònghéguó
- 1931–1937
- State flag and Military flag (1934–1937) Coat of arms
- Motto: "Proletarians and oppressed peoples of the world, unite!" (Note: Chinese: 全世界無產階級和被壓迫的民族聯合起來; pinyin: Quánshìjiè wúchǎnjiējí hé bèi yāpò de mínzú liánhé qǐlai)
- Anthem: "The Internationale" (Chinese: 國際歌) (Note: Chinese: 國際歌; pinyin: Guójìgē)
- Map of the various soviets comprising the Chinese Soviet Republic and the route of the Long March
- Capital: Ruijin, Jiangxi Soviet (1931–1934); Bao'an, Yan'an Soviet (1936–1937); Yan'an, Yan'an Soviet (1937)
- Largest city: Ruijin
- Official languages: Standard Chinese
- Demonym: Chinese
- Government: Communist proto-state
- Chairman of the Central Executive Committee
  - 1931–1937: Mao Zedong
- Chairman of the Central Revolutionary Military Committee
  - 1931–1937: Zhu De
- Chairman of the Council of People's Commissars
  - 1931–1934: Mao Zedong
  - 1934–1937: Zhang Wentian
- Legislature: National Congress of the Chinese Soviets of Workers', Peasants' and Soldiers' Deputies
- Historical era: Interwar period
  - Independence proclaimed from the Republic of China: 7 November 1931
  - Start of the Long March: 7 October 1934
  - Fall of Ruijin: 10 November 1934
  - Arrival at Shaanxi: 22 October 1935
  - Disintegration of the Soviet Republic: 22 September 1937
- Currency: Chinese Soviet yuan

Chinese name
- Traditional Chinese: 中華蘇維埃共和國
- Simplified Chinese: 中华苏维埃共和国
- Postal: Chunghwa Suwei'ai Kunghokuo
Transcriptions
Standard Mandarin
- Hanyu Pinyin: Zhōnghuá Sūwéi'āi Gònghéguó
- Wade–Giles: Chung^{1}hua^{2} Su^{1}wei^{2}'ai^{1} Kung^{4}he^{2}kuo^{2}
- IPA: [ʈʂʊ́ŋxwǎ súwěɪáɪ kʊ̂ŋxɤ̌kwǒ]
Preceded by	Succeeded by
Soviet Zone	Soviet Zone; Shaan–Gan–Ning Border Region
- Today part of: China

The Chinese Soviet Republic (CSR) (Note: Less common English translations include the Soviet Republic of China, the China Soviet Republic, and the Chinese Soviet Socialist Republic.) was a proto-state within the Republic of China, proclaimed on 7 November 1931 by Chinese Communist Party (CCP) leaders Mao Zedong and Zhu De in the early stages of the Chinese Civil War. The discontiguous territories of the CSR included 18 provinces and 4 counties under the Communists' control. The CSR's government was located in its largest component territory, the Jiangxi Soviet in southeastern China, with its capital city at Ruijin. Due to the importance of the Jiangxi Soviet in the CSR's early history, the name "Jiangxi Soviet" is sometimes used to refer to the CSR as a whole. Other component territories of the CSR included the Minzhegan, Xianggan, Xiang'egang, Honghu, Xiang'echuanqian, Eyuwan, Eyushan, Shaanxi-Gansu, Sichuan-Shaanxi, and Hailufeng Soviets.

Mao was both CSR state chairman and prime minister; he commanded the state and its government. Mao's tenure as commander of a "small state within a state" gave him experience in mobile warfare and peasant organization, which helped him lead the Chinese Communists to victory in 1949.

The encirclement campaigns initiated by the Kuomintang in 1934 forced the CCP to abandon most of the soviets in southern China. The CCP (including the leadership of the CSR) embarked on the Long March from southern China to the Yan'an Soviet, where a rump CSR continued to exist. A complex series of events in 1936 culminated in the Xi'an Incident, in which Chiang Kai-shek was kidnapped and forced to negotiate with the CCP. The CCP offered to abolish the CSR and put the Chinese Red Army (nominally) under Kuomintang control in exchange for autonomy and an alliance against Japan. These negotiations were successful, and eventually resulted in the creation of the Second United Front. The CSR was officially dissolved on 22 September 1937 and the Yan'an Soviet was reconstituted officially as the Shaan-Gan-Ning and Jin-Cha-Ji Border Regions.

== History ==
=== Background ===
During the First United Front between the Communist Party and the Kuomintang, the two parties embarked on the Northern Expedition in an effort to unify China with a single government. In 1927, the KMT broke the United Front with the Shanghai Massacre and violently suppressed the Communists. The Communists as well as a few army units loyal to them fled urban areas into the countryside, where they founded the Chinese Workers and Peasants' Red Army to wage civil war. A large group in southern China commanded by Mao Zedong established a base in the remote Jinggang Mountains. A Kuomintang counterinsurgency campaign forced Mao and his group to relocate once again, and they moved into the border region between Jiangxi and Fujian provinces.

Meanwhile, Communists from other areas of China followed a similar pattern of retreat into the countryside. In order to rebuild the party's strength, the 6th National Congress ordered these rural cadres to organize soviet governments. Beginning in 1929, soviets began to be created in isolated regions across the country, including rural Guangxi, the Eyuwan border area, and the Xiangegan border area. Mao's group founded the Jiangxi Soviet, which became the largest and best administered soviet thanks to the number of Communist cadres from across the country that took refuge there. Although the Central Committee of the Communist Party was still underground in Shanghai during this period, the center of political gravity had begun to shift to Mao in Jiangxi.

=== Establishment and growth ===
In 1931, the Communist Party decided to consolidate these isolated base areas into a single state, the Chinese Soviet Republic. The soviets combined into the CSR were discontiguous, but all south of the Yellow River.

In November 1931, a National Soviet People's Delegates Conference proclaimed the CSR in Ruijin, Jiangxi. Notably, communications between the far-flung soviets were so poor (due to their isolation and intense pressure from the Kuomintang) that the second-largest soviet, in Eyuwan, failed to send delegates. Instead, it held its own conference.

With Mao Zedong as both head of state (Chinese: 中央執行委員會主席; lit. 'Chairman of the Central Executive Committee') and head of government (Chinese: 人民委員會主席; lit. 'Chairman of the Council of People's Commissars'), the CSR gradually expanded. The CSR reached its peak in 1933. It governed a population which exceeded 3.4 million in an area of approximately 70,000 square kilometers (although the isolated soviets were never connected into one contiguous piece of territory).

=== Encirclement campaigns ===
The National Revolutionary Army conducted a series of campaigns against the various soviets of the CSR known as the "encirclement campaigns". The Jiangxi Soviet survived the first, second and third encirclement campaigns thanks to the use of flexible guerrilla tactics. However, after the third counter-encirclement campaign Mao was replaced by Wang Ming, a Chinese communist returning from the Soviet Union. The Chinese Red Army was commanded by a three-man committee, which included Wang Ming's associates Otto Braun (a Comintern military advisor), Bo Gu and Zhou Enlai. The CSR then began a rapid decline, due to its extreme left-wing governance and incompetent military command. The new leadership could not rid itself of Mao's influence (which continued during the fourth encirclement campaign), which temporarily protected the communists. However, due to the dominance of the new communist leadership after the fourth counter-encirclement campaign, the Red Army was nearly halved. Most of its equipment was lost during Chiang's fifth encirclement campaign; this began in 1933 and was orchestrated by Chiang's newly hired Nazi advisors who developed a strategy of building fortified blockhouses to advance the encirclement.

This was effective; in an effort to break the blockade the Red Army besieged the forts many times, suffering heavy casualties and only limited success. As a result, the CSR shrank significantly due to the Chinese Red Army's manpower and material losses.

=== The Long March ===
Since the Jiangxi Soviet could not be held, the Standing Committee appointed Bo (responsible for politics), Braun (responsible for military strategy), and Zhou (responsible for the implementation of military planning) to organize an evacuation. The Communists managed to successfully hide their intentions from the besieging Nationalist forces for long enough to execute a successful breakout. On 16 October 1934, a force of about 130,000 soldiers and civilians under Bo Gu and Otto Braun attacked the line of Kuomintang positions near Yudu. More than 86,000 troops, 11,000 administrative personnel and thousands of civilian porters actually completed the breakout; the remainder, largely wounded or ill soldiers, continued to fight a delaying action after the main force had left, and then dispersed into the countryside. After passing through three of the four blockhouse fortifications needed to escape Chiang's encirclement, the Red Army was finally intercepted by regular Nationalist troops, and suffered heavy casualties. Of the 86,000 Communists who attempted to break out of Jiangxi with the First Red Army, only 36,000 successfully escaped. Due to the low morale within the Red Army at the time, it is not possible to know what proportion of these losses were due to military casualties, and which proportion were due to desertion. The conditions of the Red Army's forced withdrawal demoralized some Communist leaders (particularly Bo Gu and Otto Braun), but Zhou remained calm and retained his command.

This retreat marked the beginning of what would become known as the Long March. During the course of the next two years, Communist forces abandoned almost all of their soviets in southern China that had made up the core of the CSR. The survivors went into hiding or followed Mao to Yan'an, where they took refuge in the Shaan-Gan-Ning Border Region.

=== Dissolution ===
The Chinese Soviet Republic continued to exist formally even after the Long March, since the Communists still controlled some areas such as the Hubei-Henan-Shaanxi Soviet. Bao'an was, for a time, the capital until the Communist government was moved to the Yan'an Soviet. The Chinese Soviet Republic was dissolved on 22 September 1937 when the Chinese Communist Party issued, in the Second United Front, its manifesto on unity with the Kuomintang; the Second Sino-Japanese War was only a few weeks old. The Chinese Communist Party remained in de facto control of Yan'an, which was its stronghold for the remainder of the war with Japan.

== Administration ==
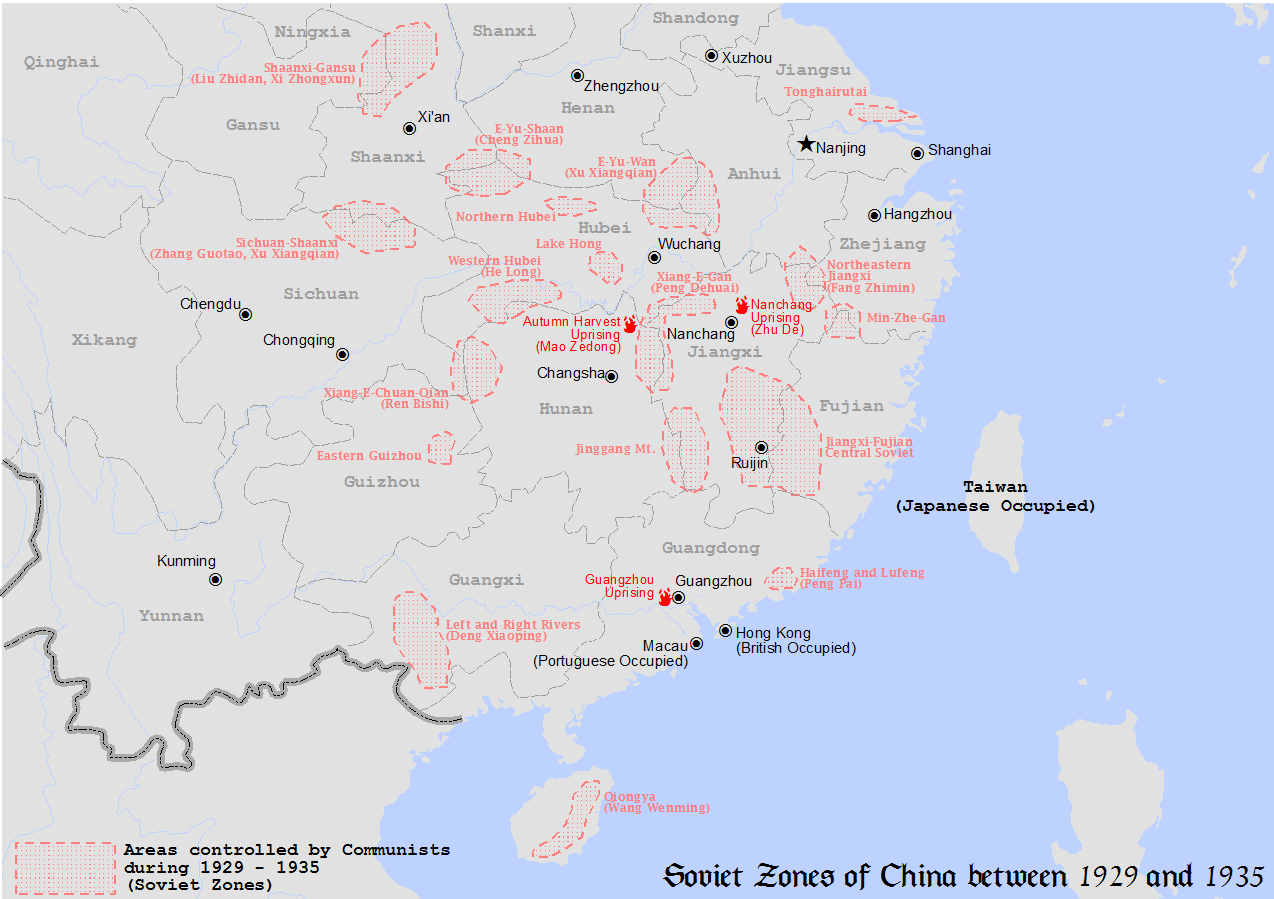
Map showing the communist-controlled Soviet Zones of China between 1929 and 1935.

The CSR had a central government as well as local and regional governments. It operated institutions including an education system and court system. The CSR also issued currency. It enacted the Outline of the Constitution of the CSR in 1934.

=== Land reform ===
The most important policy implemented by the soviet governments was land redistribution, which destroyed the landlord-dominated political economy which had existed previously. The CSR issued the 1931 Land Law, which required:

All lands belonging feudal landlords, local bullies and evil gentry, warlords, bureaucrats, and other large private landlords, irrespective of whether they work the lands themselves or rent them out, shall be confiscated without compensation. The confiscated lands shall be redistributed to the poor and middle peasants through the [CSR]. The former owners of the confiscated lands shall not be entitled to receive any land allotments.

The property of rich peasants was also confiscated, although rich peasants were entitled to receive land of lesser quality if they farmed it themselves. By 1932, the Communist Party had equalized landholding and eliminated debt within the CSR. Although the 1931 Land Law remained the official policy in the CSR's territory until the Nationalists' defeat of the CSR in 1934, after 1932, the Communist Party was more radical in its class analysis, resulting in formerly middle peasants being viewed as rich peasants.

The Chinese Red Army had modern communications technology (telephones, telegraph and radio, which the warlords' armies lacked), and transmitted wireless coded messages while breaking nationalist codes. At the time, only Chiang Kai-shek's army could match the communist forces.

The CSR declared itself a government of all Chinese workers, Red Army soldiers, and the masses. CSR policy was in large part carried out by mass organizations, particularly the Poor Peasants League, which was composed entirely of poor peasants and farm laborers. Poor peasants composed a majority of the membership of all CSR associations or state bodies.

The CSR issued regulations barring landlords, rich peasants, merchants, religious leaders, and Kuomintang members from participating in its elections. Landlords and rich peasants were barred from joining the biggest civil organizations in the CSR, the Anti-Imperialist League and the Soviet Protection League.

=== Finance ===
The 1st National Congress of the CSR tasked Mao Zemin with leading the creation of a national bank. On 1 February 1932, the Chinese Soviet Republic National Bank was established, with Mao Zemin as president. The CSR Central Mint issued three types of currency: a paper bill, a copper coin and a silver dollar.

The CSR was funded primarily by tax income on grain and rice. It also received voluntary contributions from its core political constituency, the peasantry. During the period 1931 to 1934, the CSR issued three series of government bonds to further finance its operations.

==== Banknotes ====
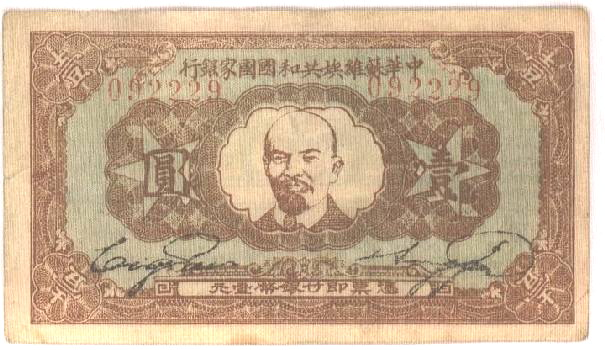
A one yuan banknote with Lenin's image in the centre

The Central Mint briefly issued both paper bills and copper coins. Neither circulated for long, primarily because the currency could not be used in the rest of China. The paper bill had "Chinese Soviet Republic National Bank" (中華蘇維埃共和國國家銀行) printed on the bill in traditional Chinese characters and a picture of Vladimir Lenin.

==== Copper coins ====
Like the paper bill, copper coins issued by the Central Mint also had "Chinese Soviet Republic" (中華蘇維埃共和國) engraved in traditional Chinese. Since coins last longer than paper bills, these coins were issued (and circulated) in a much greater quantity. However, these coins are rarer than the paper bill; copper was needed for ammunition, and these copper coins were recalled and replaced by silver dollars.

==== Silver dollars ====
The predominant currency produced by the Central Mint was the silver dollar. Unlike the bills and copper coins, the silver dollars had no communist symbols; they were a copy of silver dollars produced by other mints in China (including the popular coin with the head of Yuan Shikai and the eagle silver dollar of the Mexican peso). This, and the fact that the coin was made of silver, enabled them to be circulated in the rest of China; thus, it was the currency of choice.

When the Chinese Red Army's First Front began its Long March in October 1934, the Communist bank was part of the retreating force; fourteen bank employees, over a hundred coolies and a company of soldiers escorted them with the money and mint machinery. An important duty of the bank was, when the Chinese Red Army stayed in a location for longer than a day, to have the local populace exchange Communist paper bills and copper coins for currency used in the nationalist-controlled regions to avoid prosecution by the nationalists after the Communists left. The Zunyi Conference decided that carrying the entire bank on the march was impractical, and on 29 January 1935, at Tucheng (土城) the bank employees burned all Communist paper bills and destroyed the mint machinery. By the end of the Long March in October 1935, only eight of the original fourteen employees were left; the other six had died along the way.

=== Taxation ===
In November 1931, the National Tax Bureau was founded. In 2002, the original building was renovated for the public.

=== Postage stamps ===
The Directorate General of Chinese Soviet Posts was founded in Ruijin on 1 May 1932. The first stamps were designed by Huang Yaguang and printed lithographically by the Printing House of the Ministry of Finance in Ruijin. White paper or newspaper was used. They were imperforate, and denominated in the Chinese Soviet silver-dollar currency. They are fairly rare, and sought after by collectors. There are also many forgeries and bogus issues imitating early stamps from the Communist areas.

=== Media ===
On 11 December 1931, the CSR government established its official newspaper, Red China, a forerunner to the People's Daily and Xinhua News Agency.

== Historiography ==
The official history in the People's Republic of China views the Chinese Soviet Republic positively, although it is recognized that the regime was ultimately a failure. In a speech on the 80th anniversary of the CSR's founding, General Secretary of the Chinese Communist Party Xi Jinping focused on the fact that the CSR was attempting to do something novel, stating "The Chinese Soviet Republic was the first national workers' and peasants' regime in Chinese history." The efforts of the CSR government are seen as having built the reputation of the CCP and strengthened the Chinese Red Army. Commentaries usually tout the CSR as an experiment that paved the way for the success of the later People's Republic. In the Historical Picture Book of the Chinese Soviet Republic, the Ganzhou Municipal Committee of the CCP called the CSR a "great rehearsal for the People's Republic of China."

== See also ==
- Outline of the Chinese Civil War
- Communist-controlled China (1927–1949)
- Two Chinas
- Chinese Red Army
- National Revolutionary Army
- History of the Republic of China
- Military of the Republic of China
- Politics of the People's Republic of China
