= Ruijin =

Ruijin 瑞金市 Juicheng, Juiking
- County-level & Sub-prefectural city
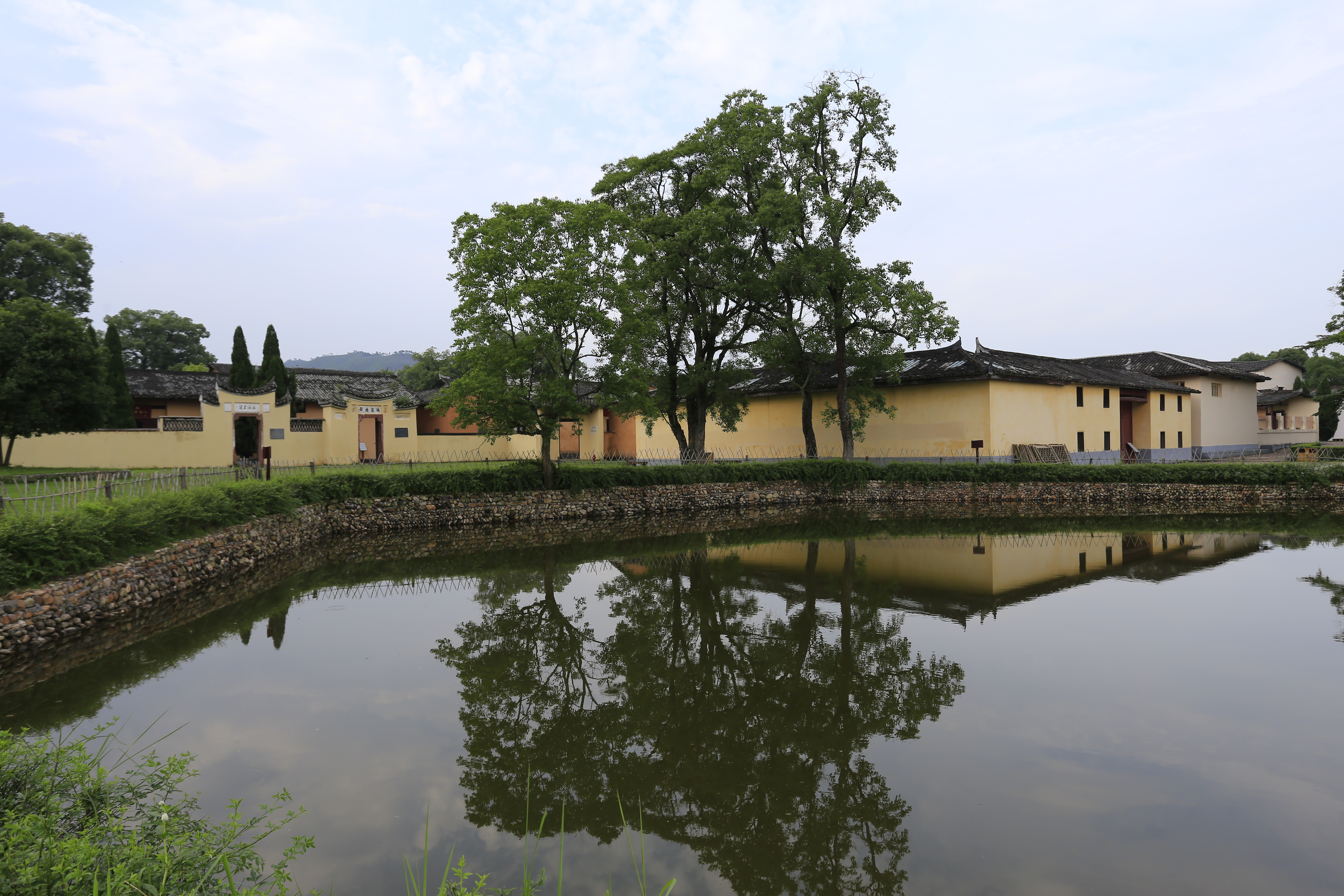
- Ruijin

- Location in Jiangxi
- Coordinates: 25°53′10″N 116°01′37″E
- Country: People's Republic of China
- Province: Jiangxi
- Prefecture-level city: Ganzhou
- Postal Code: 342500

Ruijin
- Chinese: 瑞金
- Postal: Juicheng
Transcriptions
Standard Mandarin
- Hanyu Pinyin: Ruìjīn
- Wade–Giles: Jui^{4}-chin^{1}

Ruijin (Chinese: 瑞金; pinyin: Ruìjīn) is a county-level city of Ganzhou in the mountains bordering Fujian Province in the south-eastern part of Jiangxi Province. Formerly a county, Ruijin became a county-level city on May 18, 1994.

It was an early center of Chinese communist activity and developed a reputation as cradle of the Chinese Communist Revolution. In the late-1920s, the Nationalists forced the Communists out of the Jinggang Mountains, sending them fleeing to Ruijin and the safety of its relative isolation in the rugged mountains along Jiangxi-Fujian border. In 1931, Mao Zedong founded the Chinese Soviet Republic (CSR) with Ruijin as its capital; it was called Ruijing by the CSR. The Communists withdrew in 1934 on the Long March after being surrounded again by the Nationalists.

During the Cultural Revolution, the Ruijin Massacre in September and October 1968 killed over 300 people in the county.

Ruijin is a popular destination for red tourism and ecotourism. It is a pilgrimage for Maoists from China and around the globe.

== Administrative divisions ==
Ruijin City has 7 towns and 10 townships.

7 Towns

- Xianghu (象湖镇)
- Ruilin (瑞林镇)
- Rentian (壬田镇)
- Jiubao (九堡镇)
- Shazhouba (沙洲坝镇)
- Xiefang (谢坊镇)
- Wuyang (武阳镇)

10 Townships

- Yeping Township (叶坪乡)
- Dingpi Township (丁陂乡)
- Dabaidi Township (大柏地乡)
- Gangmian Township (岗面乡)
- Ridong Township (日东乡)
- Wantian Township (万田乡)
- Huangbai Township (黄柏乡)
- Yunshishan Township (云石山乡)
- Zetan Township (泽覃乡)
- Baying Township (拔英乡)

== Climate ==
Climate data for Ruijin, elevation 290 m (950 ft), (1991–2020 normals, extremes 1981–2010)
Month	Jan	Feb	Mar	Apr	May	Jun	Jul	Aug	Sep	Oct	Nov	Dec	Year
Record high °C (°F)	27.9 (82.2)	31.2 (88.2)	32.8 (91.0)	34.1 (93.4)	35.8 (96.4)	37.5 (99.5)	40.4 (104.7)	39.7 (103.5)	37.4 (99.3)	36.4 (97.5)	33.5 (92.3)	27.9 (82.2)	40.4 (104.7)
Mean daily maximum °C (°F)	13.5 (56.3)	16.2 (61.2)	19.2 (66.6)	25.2 (77.4)	28.9 (84.0)	31.4 (88.5)	34.3 (93.7)	33.7 (92.7)	31.0 (87.8)	26.8 (80.2)	21.6 (70.9)	15.9 (60.6)	24.8 (76.7)
Daily mean °C (°F)	8.6 (47.5)	11.2 (52.2)	14.5 (58.1)	20.2 (68.4)	24.0 (75.2)	26.7 (80.1)	28.9 (84.0)	28.2 (82.8)	25.7 (78.3)	21.0 (69.8)	15.7 (60.3)	10.2 (50.4)	19.6 (67.3)
Mean daily minimum °C (°F)	5.3 (41.5)	7.8 (46.0)	11.2 (52.2)	16.5 (61.7)	20.4 (68.7)	23.4 (74.1)	24.7 (76.5)	24.5 (76.1)	21.9 (71.4)	16.8 (62.2)	11.6 (52.9)	6.3 (43.3)	15.9 (60.5)
Record low °C (°F)	−5.2 (22.6)	−2.5 (27.5)	−2.1 (28.2)	4.8 (40.6)	11.4 (52.5)	15.0 (59.0)	19.4 (66.9)	19.2 (66.6)	12.5 (54.5)	4.2 (39.6)	−1.0 (30.2)	−6.5 (20.3)	−6.5 (20.3)
Average precipitation mm (inches)	76.7 (3.02)	103.8 (4.09)	199.6 (7.86)	192.3 (7.57)	263.0 (10.35)	268.3 (10.56)	139.6 (5.50)	157.4 (6.20)	76.9 (3.03)	47.7 (1.88)	67.8 (2.67)	55.1 (2.17)	1,648.2 (64.9)
Average precipitation days (≥ 0.1 mm)	10.8	12.8	18.8	17.0	18.0	17.5	12.5	15.1	9.2	6.0	8.1	8.4	154.2
Average snowy days	0.7	0.5	0	0	0	0	0	0	0	0	0	0.4	1.6
Average relative humidity (%)	79	80	82	79	80	80	73	76	77	75	77	76	78
Mean monthly sunshine hours	85.6	85.2	76.6	101.4	119.0	132.3	217.9	196.7	163.4	158.3	132.4	123.4	1,592.2
Percentage possible sunshine	26	27	21	27	29	32	52	49	45	45	41	38	36
Source: China Meteorological Administration

== Transport ==
- Ganzhou–Longyan Railway
- Ganzhou Ruijin Airport

On 22 May 2016 the BBC reported that four cars fell into a sinkhole in Ruijin City.
