= Encirclement campaign against the Hunan-Hubei-Jiangxi Soviet =

1930 military campaign

Encirclement campaign against Hunan-Hubei-Jiangxi Soviet
- Part of the Chinese Civil War
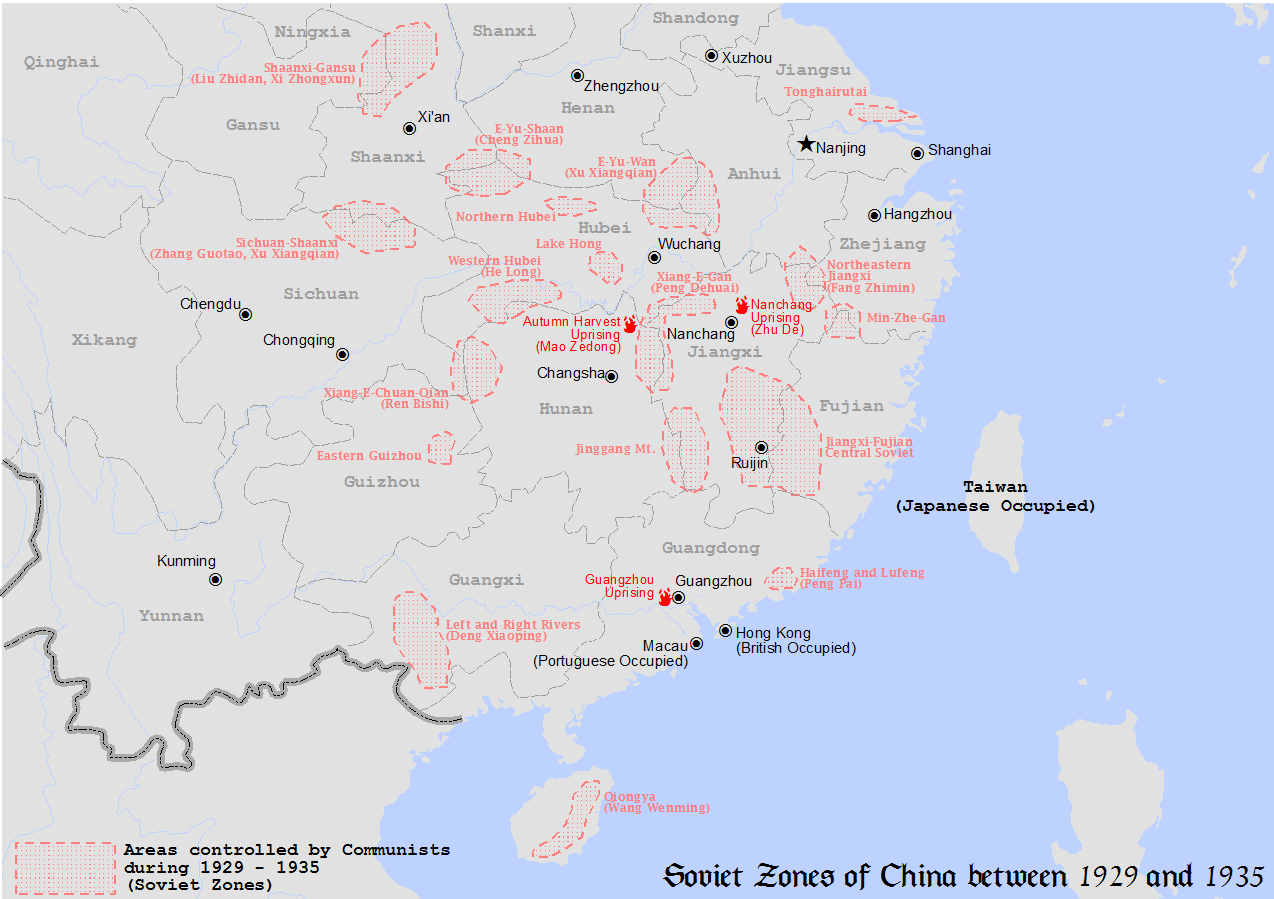
- Location of Hunan-Hubei-Jiangxi (Xiang-E-Gan) Soviet
Date	December, 1930 – May, 1931
Location	Border region of Hunan-Hubei-Jiangxi provinces, China
Result	Communist victory

Belligerents
Nationalist China	Chinese Red Army

Commanders and leaders
Chiang Kai-shek	Yang Youlin

Strength
10,000+	16th Red Army ~ 4,000

Casualties and losses
3,000+	?

The encirclement campaign against the Hunan-Hubei-Jiangxi Soviet was a military campaign launched by the Kuomintang Nationalist Government against the communist Soviet force in the Hunan-Hubei-Jiangxi. It was responded to with the Communists' Counter-encirclement campaign at the Hunan-Hubei-Jiangxi Soviet (Chinese: 湘鄂赣苏区反围剿), also called their Counter-encirclement campaign at the Hunan-Hubei-Jiangxi Revolutionary Base (Chinese: 湘鄂赣革命根据地反围剿). The local red army successfully defended this soviet republic against the government attacks from December 1930 through to May 1931.

The communist 16th Army, commanded by Vice Chairman Yang Youlin, stationed at the Hunan-Hubei-Jiangxi Soviet launched a preemptive strike against the Nationalist forces and annihilated an entire Nationalist regiment in Tongcheng (通城), Hubei in December - just before the Nationalists could begin the first attack of the campaign. The Nationalists had to withdraw temporarily to regroup. Reinforcement troops from other regions came to the Soviet area to avenge the defeat at Tongcheng, leaving these other regions vulnerable to Communist attacks. Pouncing on the opportunity, the forces of the Hunan-Jiangxi Soviet decided to help their comrades in the Hunan-Hubei-Jiangxi Soviet by striking the government in two fronts, in the west and in the southeast of Hunan.

Both Communist offensives in Hunan were successful. In addition to obtaining more land, weaponry, money and supplies, the Hunan-Jiangxi Soviet force also linked up with the Red 7th Army at the province's border with Guangdong. The Nationalists were forced to redeploy their troops to face these new, more urgent threats; as a result the planned offensives against the Hunan-Hubei-Jiangxi Soviet. However, the Red 16th Army launched another round of assaults on the retreating Nationalist troops, annihilating eleven companies. After this victory, the 16th Army was joined by the Independent 3rd Division; together they succeeded in annihilating two more Nationalist regiments.

The encirclement campaign against the Hunan-Hubei-Jiangxi Soviet was a failure. The Nationalists decided to discontinue the effort and concentrate their energy and resources on other encirclement campaigns against major communist bases - Soviet Republics of much larger size - reasoning that as the larger bases were eliminated the smaller ones would not last long. As a result of the government retreat, the Hunan-Hubei-Jiangxi Soviet declared victory and continued to expand and consolidate their Soviet territory.

== See also ==
- Outline of the Chinese Civil War
- National Revolutionary Army
- History of the People's Liberation Army
- Chinese Civil War
