= Jin-Cha-Ji Border Region =

Chinese Communist Party-controlled area

Shanxi-Chahar-Hebei Border Region 晉察冀邊區
- Communist-controlled region of China
- 1937–1950
- Capital: Zhangjiakou (1945–50)
- Historical era: Chinese Civil War
  - Established: 1937
  - Disestablished: 1950
Preceded by	Succeeded by
Hebei	Hebei
- Today part of: China

The Shanxi-Chahar-Hebei Border Region, frequently abbreviated at the Jin-Cha-Ji Border Region (traditional Chinese: 晉察冀邊區; simplified Chinese: 晋察冀边区; pinyin: Jìn-Chá-Jì Biānqū), was an area under the control of the Chinese Communist Party during the Second Sino-Japanese War and the second phase of the Chinese Civil War.

After their success in the Battle of Pingxingguan in September 1937, in October 1937, the 115th Division of the Eighth Route Army was ordered to occupy the Mount Wutai area of Shanxi in order to set up an Anti-Japanese Base Area.

== Naming ==
This was called the Shanxi-Chahar-Hebei Anti-Japanese Base Area, often referred to as a communist Border Area or Liberated Area. The abbreviated names of the three provinces were often used to describe the area, thus it was known as Jin-Cha-Ji in modern transliteration. In older Western literature it was often called Chin-Cha-Ki. Note that the term Border Area was used in official descriptions, for example, the postal service, set up in November 1937, was named the Shanxi-Hebei-Chahar Border Area Provisional Post.

== History ==
The inefficacy of the Nationalist government in Hebei during the Second Sino-Japanese War provided an opportunity for the CCP to develop its government and mass organizations into the Shanxi-Chahar-Hebei Border Region. During the war, the CCP built a broader coalition in the Shanxi-Chahar-Hebei Border Region.

After Japan's fall 1938 victory in the Battle of Wuhan, its forces advanced deep into CCP-controlled territory and redeployed 50,000 troops to the Shanxi-Chahar-Hebei Border Region. Elements of the Eighth Route Army soon attacked the advancing Japanese, claiming to have inflicted between 3,000 and 5,000 casualties and caused a Japanese retreat while suffering more than 3,000 casualties. (Note: Known as the "Anti-Encirclement Campaign in the Shanxi-Chahar-Hebei Border Region" by the Eighth Route Army and as the "North Shanxi Operation" by the North China Area Army.) (Note: The 109th Division suffered 94 killed and 207 wounded in the North Shanxi Operation while claiming approximately 2,150 abandoned enemy corpses and 52 POWs against Nationalist and Communist troops from September 18 to October 31, 1938. On November 4, 5,000 troops from the 714th and 716th Regiments of the 358th Brigade of the 129th Division and the 4th Battalion of the 2nd Military Sub-District of the Shanxi-Chahar-Hebei Border Region attacked a battalion of the 109th Division at Wutai County, claiming to have killed or wounded more than 500 enemy troops and capturing 21 while suffering 24 killed and 85 wounded from November 3 to November 4. The 109th Division reported suffering approximately 200 killed or wounded in the ambush on November 4 while claiming to have wiped out an enemy force of approximately 500 troops and capturing 70 on November 3. On the other hand, according to the status report of the divisional commander after the division’s demobilization, the 109th Division suffered 60 killed and 142 wounded while claiming approximately 2,910 abandoned enemy corpses and 208 POWs in the whole Wuning Operation against Nationalist and Communist troops from November 1 to December 25, 1938.; The Eighth Route Army claimed to have killed or wounded more than 800 troops of the 26th Division from September 25 to October 1 while suffering more than 200 casualties and killed or wounded more than 1,150 troops of the 2nd Independent Mixed Brigade and collaborationist troops and capturing 4 Japanese troops in 5 major battles in October while suffering more than 559 casualties. The Mongolia Garrison Army in October suffered 7 killed and 25 wounded from the 26th Division and 19 killed and 56 wounded from the 2nd Independent Mixed Brigade while claiming 1,222 abandoned enemy corpses. The bloodiest day for the 2nd Independent Mixed Brigade on that month was on October 28 in the battles of Shaojiagou and Jiazhuang, where the mixed brigade claimed to have fought with a total of approximately 800 Communist Army troops and claimed 110 abandoned enemy corpses while suffering 16 killed and 51 wounded. In the ambushes of Zhangjiawan, Shaojiazhuang, and Jiazhuang that day, the Eighth Route Army invested the main force of the 358th Brigade of the 120th Division and a battalion of the 1st Military Sub-District of the Shanxi-Chahar-Hebei Border Region, claiming to have killed or wounded more than 500 troops of the 2nd Independent Mixed Brigade and reinforcements and capturing 4 while suffering more than 220 casualties. Of the other losses of the mixed brigade that month, 1 was killed fighting against Zhang Chengde’s Nationalist troops, 2 were killed and 3 were wounded fighting against Communist troops, and 1 was killed and 2 were wounded from mines.; The Eighth Route Army recorded one major battle against the 4th Independent Mixed Brigade during the Anti-Encirclement Campaign, claiming to have killed Major General Kiyo Shimizu and killed or wounded more than 400 other Japanese troops in the battles of Bailanzhen and Shifosi from September 29 to October 1 while suffering 209 casualties. The 4th Independent Mixed Brigade reported the Shimizu task force suffering 2 wounded in the battles near Bailanzhen and Shifosi on September 29 and September 30 while claiming 80 abandoned enemy corpses and 6 killed including task force commander Shimizu and 25 wounded in the battle near Shifosi on October 1 while claiming "many" abandoned enemy corpses.; The Eighth Route Army claimed to have killed or wounded more than 2,000 troops of the 110th Division and reinforcements and captured 2 from late September to late October 1938 as part of the Anti-Encirclement Campaign. The reported casualties of the 110th Division in this operation was unknown, but from August 1938 to October 1939, the division was reported to have fought against Nationalist and Communist guerillas in approximately 2,250 battles (an average of 5 per day) and claimed approximately 36,260 abandoned enemy corpses while losing 533 troops killed in action.) (Note: In the North Shanxi Operation, the Japanese Army was facing not only the Communist Eighth Route Army but also Nationalist troops aligned to Yan Xishan such as Jin Xianzhang’s New 2nd Division, Yan Yufeng’s 1st district and Guo Rusong’s 2nd district of the Shanxi Peace Preservation Force, and three regiments of Zhao Chengshou’s 1st Cavalry Army, all of which, with the exception of the 1st Cavalry Army in guerilla operations, the Japanese Army claimed to have inflicted heavy casualties including the death of commander Yan Yufeng and the dissolution of the 1st district peace preservation force. In the battle of Dingxiang against the aforementioned Nationalist troops on October 1 alone, the 109th Division suffered 4 killed and 51 wounded.) The Shanxi-Chahar-Hebei Border Region continued to be attacked by the Japanese beginning in late 1939, with Japanese forces engaging in their Three Alls Policy ("kill all, burn all, loot all").

In 1944, the wartime situation had stabilized in the Border Region. The Rectification Movement, which had not previously been fully implemented due to the less stable situation in the region, was implemented in earnest.

From the winter of 1937 to 1945, the Shanxi-Chahar-Hebei Border Region of the Eighth Route Army engaged with Japanese and Chinese collaborationist troops in 28,221 battles, claiming to have killed, wounded, or captured 288,988 Japanese and collaborationist troops and accepted the surrender and defection of 34 Japanese troops and 17,592 collaborationist troops. In the same period, the Shanxi-Chahar-Hebei Border Region suffered 34,970 killed, 51,577 wounded, and 6,199 missing.

At the beginning of the Chinese Civil War in 1946, large Nationalist forces entered the Shanxi-Chahar-Hebei Border Region. Although information on the extent of territory controlled by the Nationalists during this period is not clear, one CCP report indicates that by October 1946, the Nationalists and their allies controlled or contested 45% of villages in the region. This decreased to approximately 35% by February 1947.

By late 1948, the Nationalists' conventional armed forces had been ejected from the region, although Nationalist-affiliated militia remained active thereafter.

== Economy ==
In an effort to sabotage the economy, Japanese forces forged local currency and Nationalist government currency and circulated them in the Shanxi-Chahar-Hebei Border region. The Border Region Bank established currency comparison offices in each county and district to oppose the Japanese counterfeit effort.

On 23 October 1944, the region's Administrative Committee issued its Directions on Fiscal Matters, strengthening banking institutions, financial operations, and officially establishing the Central Hebei Printing Press to print currency.

=== Land policies ===
CCP land policies were more moderate than during other periods, focusing on rent and interest rate deductions. Implementation of these reforms accelerated following 1943. Following the May 4, 1946 Instructions on Land Issues issued by the CCP, instructions for implementing the instructions in the Shanxi-Chahar-Hebei Border Region stated that the intent was to achieve land to the tiller rather than equal redistribution.

In April 1947, the Shanxi-Chahar-Hebei Border Region began a Land Reinvestigation Movement in which poor peasant mass organizations investigated and adjusted the results of land distribution during the Second Sino-Japanese War. During this Land Reinvestigation Movement, it was mandated that landlords could not be completely dispossessed of land unless they had collaborated with the Japanese invaders or defected to the Nationalists. It was also mandated that the interests of middle peasants could not be violated.

Concluding that most peasants were satisfied with the land they had received and that some were even concerned about further mass land reform campaigns because of their radical turns in the past, in June 1948, the CCP ended land reform in the Border Region and in northern China generally with the exception of an area of approximately ten million people.

== Media ==
The CCP's Shanxi-Chahar-Hebei Border Region Committee had an official newspaper, the Shanxi-Chahar-Hebei Daily.

== Cultural policies ==
Following the example of Yan'an, in July 1941 the border region passed new marriage regulations designed ensure that marriages were made by "both partners freely, independently, and voluntarily" and to prohibit practices like arranged marriage, coercion, concubinage, and child brides.

== Armed forces ==
When the Chinese Civil War began after the defeat of the Japanese, the Shanxi-Chahar-Hebei Field Army had more than 180,000 soldiers. It later merged with other forces into the 234,000 soldier North China Field Army.

Militias in the Shanxi-Chahar-Hebei Border Region included several thousand militia members per county, sometimes as many as 10,000 or 25,000.

== See also ==
- Shaan-Gan-Ning Border Region
