= Zhou Meiyu =

Chinese nurse

Chow Meiyu
- 周美玉
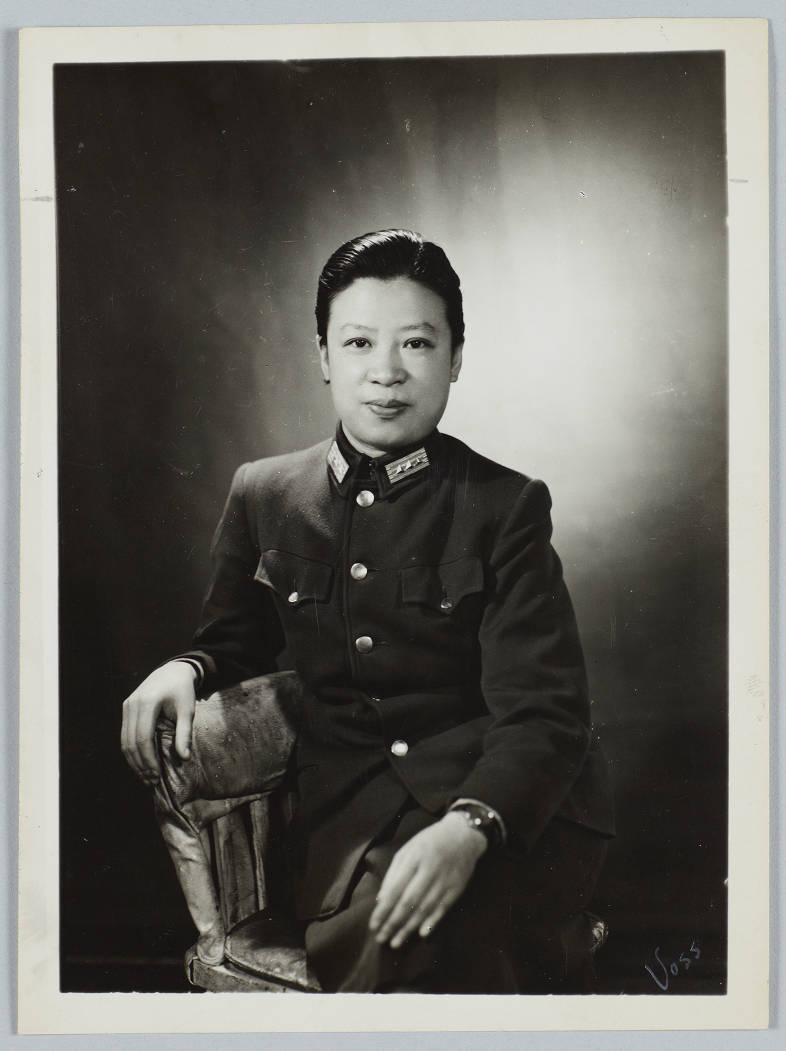
- Zhou Meiyu (1943)
- Born: 1910; Beijing
- Died: 2001 (aged 90–91); Taiwan
- Education: Peking Union Medical College, Massachusetts Institute of Technology, Columbia University
- Occupation: Nurse
- Known for: Development of modern military nursing in China; founder of Army School of Nursing in Guiyang; first female major general in the Republic of China

Zhou Meiyu (Chinese: 周美玉) (1910–2001) was a Chinese nurse, known as "the mother of military nursing in China" and "among the most influential Chinese nurses of the early twentieth century". She was the founder of the Army School of Nursing at the Emergency Medical Service Training School in Guiyang, a strong proponent of military nursing during and after the Second Sino-Japanese War and Chinese Civil War, and the first woman in the Republic of China to attain the rank of major general (少將, shaojing). Xu Nanli, an adjunct professor at National Yang-Ming University who studied under her, described her as the "Nightingale of China".

== Early life and education ==
Zhou was born in Beijing in 1910 and attended Peiyuan Primary School, Bridgeman Girls High School, and Yanjing University, all Christian missionary schools in Beijing. She is originally from a town just south of Hangzhou. In 1926, she entered a medical training program run jointly by Yanjing University and the Nursing School of Peking Union Medical College (PUMC). She earned a degree and her Registered Nurse License from PUMC in 1930. She worked as head nurse at Cemtral Clinic.

She was awarded two fellowships by the Rockefeller Foundation's China Medical Board to study in the United States. In 1933, she studied at the Massachusetts Institute of Technology, where she earned a B.A. in public health and health education. In 1944, she earned a master's degree in public health from MIT when she submitted her thesis on the development of an army nursing school in China. Zhou used the second fellowship in 1948 to study at Columbia University, where she earned a master's degree in education.

== Career ==
In 1931, Zhou left Peking Union Medical College (PUMC) to work with the Mass Education Movement (MEM), an effort to coordinate education and public health for the rural Chinese population led by Y. C. James Yen, in Dingxian. She served as chief nurse at the MEM's health clinic from 1931-1938. She trained public health nurses who traveled to care for patients within specific areas of the county, providing health examinations and vaccines and checking for environmental cleanliness and safety.

In 1938, she was offered the position of dean at the PUMC School of Nursing. However, she declined this position in order to join the Chinese effort against the Japanese in the Second Sino-Japanese War.

=== Service in the Second Sino-Japanese War ===
Zhou served in the nursing corps on the front of the Second Sino-Japanese War (1937-1945). In September 1937, she fled Dingxian with other members of the Mass Education Movement (MEM), including nurses in her training, as the city came under attack from Japanese forces. The group relocated to Changsha, where MEM services, including nursing, pivoted to national defense work.

In 1938, Zhou began work with the Chinese Red Cross Medical Relief Corps (MRC), where she was head of the supply base for mobile MRC units. Following this, she was appointed to the position of chief nursing consultant to the MRC and head of the nursing department of the newly-founded Emergency Medical Service Training School (EMSTS) in Guiyang. The EMSTS provided intensive medical training for health students entering the MRC and army in a variety of roles in emergency care, including surgeons, nurses, ambulance workers, and hospital orderlies. At the start of her tenure at the EMSTS, she founded a branch of the Nursing Association of China.

=== Founding the Army Nursing School ===
During her time at the Emergency Medical Service Training School (EMSTS), Zhou became a vocal proponent of founding an Army Nursing School. In 1941, Zhou and Guan Baozhen, her colleague at the Medical Relief Corps and EMSTS, submitted a proposal for such a school, which would provide a "modern nursing policy" for military nursing services. They suggested establishing regular army posts and professional titles for nurses who graduated from the school. After negotiations and with support from the Army Health Administration, the Nationalist Ministry of War approved their proposal in 1943. Zhou was appointed dean. She was, at this point, a colonel in the Army Medical Corps (see photograph).

The Army Nursing School received funding from the American Bureau for Medical Aid to China, the National Federation of Business and Professional Women's Clubs of the United States. After its founding, it continued to receive support from non-Chinese organizations. From 1945-1946, the American Bureau for Medical Aid to China and the British United Aid to China Fund sponsored Zhou's travel to England and the United States to promote Red Cross work in China.

In 1947, the Army Nursing School was relocated close to Shanghai to become part of the National Defense Medical Center, where Zhou continued to serve as dean of nursing.

After the Chinese Communist Party's 1949 victory in the Chinese Civil War, the Chinese Nationalist Party government, its army, and associated institutions including the National Defense Medical Center, relocated to Taiwan. After being a colonel in the Army, in 1957 she was promoted to be Lt General. First female general with Republic of China since 1949. The previous female general was in military encrypt business whose team broke the Pearl Harbor invasion code. Her code translation was tossed out as impossibility by the US Military attaché in China.

In 2001, Zhou was posthumously awarded the 10th Medical Dedication Award from the Legislative Yuan Health and Welfare Association of Taipei.

== Personal life ==
After the Chinese Civil War, she took her mother to Taiwan and lived in Keelung.

Earlier she was a friend to Major Edith Nie Sih, who had very similar credentials. It is worth noting another classmate Ka Shu Hsu (徐蔼诸), who was also a student at Columbia University, was involved in US fund raising opened several nursing schools in China. Mme Chiang Kai-shek's photos with Zhou were found.

Most of her activities, however centered around school and students. She never married. She was a devout Christian, attending Grace Baptist Church, in Taipei, Taiwan. She wrote memoirs about herself and how she created nursing school and accomplishment during World War II in China. Her memoirs were published in 1993.
