= Bibliography of works by Mao Zedong =

Works written by Mao Zedong

Mao Zedong
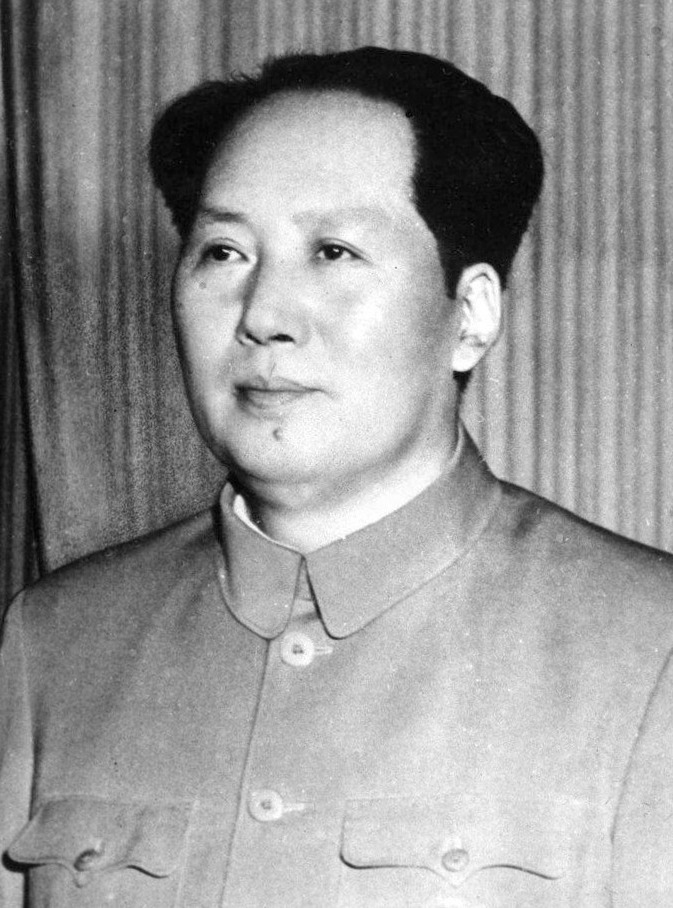
- Formal portrait, 1950

Chairman of the Chinese Communist Party
- In office 20 March 1943 – 9 September 1976
- Deputy: Liu Shaoqi; Lin Biao; Zhou Enlai; Hua Guofeng
- Preceded by: Zhang Wentian (as general secretary)
- Succeeded by: Hua Guofeng

Chairman of the Central Military Commission
- In office 8 September 1954 – 9 September 1976
- Deputy: Zhu De; Lin Biao; Ye Jianying
- Succeeded by: Hua Guofeng

Chairman of the People's Republic of China
- In office 27 September 1954 – 27 April 1959
- Premier: Zhou Enlai
- Deputy: Zhu De
- Preceded by: Yan Xishan (as acting president)
- Succeeded by: Liu Shaoqi

Chairman of the Central People's Government
- In office 1 October 1949 – 27 September 1954
- Premier: Zhou Enlai
- Preceded by: Li Zongren (as acting president)

Chairman of the National Committee of the Chinese People's Political Consultative Conference
- In office 9 October 1949 – 25 December 1954
- Preceded by: Office established
- Succeeded by: Zhou Enlai

Personal details
- Born: 26 December 1893 Shaoshan, Hunan Province, Qing Empire
- Died: 9 September 1976 (aged 82) Beijing, People's Republic of China
- Resting place: Chairman Mao Memorial Hall
- Party: Communist Party of China (from 1921)
- Other political affiliations: Kuomintang (1925–1926)
- Spouses: Luo Yixiu (m. 1907; died 1910); Yang Kaihui (m. 1920; died 1930); He Zizhen (m. 1928; div. 1937); Jiang Qing (m. 1938)
- Children: 10, including: Mao Anying; Mao Anqing; Mao Anlong; Yang Yuehua; Li Min; Li Na
- Parents: Mao Yichang; Wen Qimei
- Relatives: Mao family
- Education: Hunan First Normal University

Chinese name
- Simplified Chinese: 毛泽东
- Traditional Chinese: 毛澤東
Transcriptions
Standard Mandarin
- Hanyu Pinyin: Máo Zédōng
- Bopomofo: ㄇㄠˊ ㄗㄜˊ ㄉㄨㄥ
- Wade–Giles: Mao^{2} Tse^{2}-tung^{1}
- Tongyong Pinyin: Máo Zé-dong
- IPA: [mǎʊ tsɤ̌.tʊ́ŋ]
Wu
- Suzhounese: Mau^{2} Zeq^{8}-ton^{1}
Hakka
- Romanization: Mô Chhe̍t-tûng
Yue: Cantonese
- Yale Romanization: Mòuh Jaahk-dūng
- Jyutping: Mou4 zaak6 dung1
- IPA: [mɔw˩ tsak̚˨ tʊŋ˥]
Southern Min
- Hokkien POJ: Mô͘ Te̍k-tong
- Tâi-lô: Môo Ti̍k-tang

Courtesy name
- Simplified Chinese: 润之
- Traditional Chinese: 潤之
Transcriptions
Standard Mandarin
- Hanyu Pinyin: Rùnzhī
- Bopomofo: ㄖㄨㄣˋ ㄓ
- Wade–Giles: Jun^{4}-chih^{1}
- Tongyong Pinyin: Rùn-jhih
- IPA: [ɻwə̂n.ʈʂɻ̩́]
Yue: Cantonese
- Yale Romanization: Yeuhn-jī
- Jyutping: Jeon6 zi1
- IPA: [jɵn˨ tsi˥]
Southern Min
- Hokkien POJ: Lūn-chi
- Central institution membership: 1964–1976: Member, National People's Congress; 1954–1959: Member, National People's Congress; 1938–1976: Member, 6th, 7th, 8th, 9th, 10th Politburo; 1938–1976: Member, 6th, 7th, 8th, 9th, 10th Central Committee; Other offices held: 1954–1959: Chairman of the People's Republic of China; 1954–1976: Chairman, CCP Central Military Commission; 1954–1959: President and Chairman, National Defence Council; 1954–1976: Honorary Chairman, CPPCC National Committee; 1949–1954: Chairman, Central People's Revolutionary Military Commission; 1949–1954: Chairman, CPPCC National Committee; 1949–1954: Chairman, PRC Central People's Government; 1943–1956: Chairman, CCP Central Secretariat; 1936–1949: Chairman, CCP Central Military Commission
- Paramount Leader of the People's Republic of China: (Inaugural holder); Hua Guofeng →

The is a bibliography of works by Mao Zedong.

Mao Zedong (Note: /ˈmaʊ (t)səˈtʊŋ/; Chinese: 毛泽东; pinyin: Máo Zédōng pronounced [mǎʊ tsɤ̌.tʊ́ŋ]; traditionally romanised as Mao Tse-tung. In this Chinese name, the family name is Mao and Ze is a generation name. While the pinyin-derived spelling Mao Zedong is increasingly common, the Wade–Giles-derived spelling Mao Tse-tung continues to be used in modern publications to some extent.) (26 December 1893 – 9 September 1976) was a Chinese revolutionary, political theorist, and dictator who founded the People's Republic of China (PRC) and served as its paramount leader from 1949 until his death in 1976 primarily through his role as the Chairman of the Chinese Communist Party (CCP). (Note: Mao Zedong held the CCP leader position under the title of "Chairman of the CCP Central Politburo" from 20 March 1943 until 19 June 1945 and "Chairman of the CCP Central Committee" from 19 June 1945 until his death on 9 September 1976.) He led the Chinese Communist Party to victory in the Chinese Civil War and launched the Cultural Revolution. Mao Zedong Thought, which he advocated as a Chinese adaptation of Marxism–Leninism, influenced movements and Maoist organizations worldwide.

== Individual works ==
- Mao, Z. (1937). On guerrilla warfare. In Selected works of Mao Tse-tung (Vol. 6). Marxists Internet Archive.
- Mao, Z. (1917, April). A study of physical education. In Selected works of Mao Tse-tung (Vol. 6). Marxists Internet Archive.
- Mao, Z. (1919, November 16). Miss Chao's suicide. In Selected works of Mao Tse-tung (Vol. 6). Marxists Internet Archive.
- Mao, Z. (1926, March). Analysis of the classes in Chinese society. In Selected works of Mao Tse-tung (Vol. 1). Foreign Languages Press.
- Mao, Z. (1927, March). Report on an investigation of the peasant movement in Hunan. In Selected works of Mao Tse-tung (Vol. 1). Foreign Languages Press.
- Mao, Z. (1928, October 5). Why is it that red political power can exist in China?. In Selected works of Mao Tse-tung (Vol. 1). Foreign Languages Press.
- Mao, Z. (1929, December). On correcting mistaken ideas in the party. In Selected works of Mao Tse-tung (Vol. 1). Foreign Languages Press.
- Mao, Z. (1930, January 5). A single spark can start a prairie fire. In Selected works of Mao Tse-tung (Vol. 1). Foreign Languages Press.
- Mao, Z. (1930, May). Oppose book worship. In Selected works of Mao Tse-tung (Vol. 6). Marxists Internet Archive.
- Mao, Z. (1936, December). Problems of strategy in China's revolutionary war. In Selected works of Mao Tse-tung (Vol. 1). Foreign Languages Press.
- Mao, Z. (1937, July). On practice. In Selected works of Mao Tse-tung (Vol. 1). Foreign Languages Press.
- Mao, Z. (1937, August). On contradiction. In Selected works of Mao Tse-tung (Vol. 1). Foreign Languages Press.
- Mao, Z. (1937, September 7). Combat liberalism. In Selected works of Mao Tse-tung (Vol. 2). Foreign Languages Press.
- Mao, Z. (1938, May). On protracted war. In Selected works of Mao Tse-tung (Vol. 2). Foreign Languages Press.
- Mao, Z. (1938, November 6). Problems of war and strategy. In Selected works of Mao Tse-tung (Vol. 2). Foreign Languages Press.
- Mao, Z. (1939, December). The Chinese revolution and the Chinese Communist Party. In Selected works of Mao Tse-tung (Vol. 2). Foreign Languages Press.
- Mao, Z. (1939, December 21). In memory of Norman Bethune. In Selected works of Mao Tse-tung (Vol. 2). Foreign Languages Press.
- Mao, Z. (1940, January). On new democracy. In Selected works of Mao Tse-tung (Vol. 2). Foreign Languages Press.
- Mao, Z. (1942, February 1). Rectify the party's style of work. In Selected works of Mao Tse-tung (Vol. 3). Foreign Languages Press.
- Mao, Z. (1942, February 8). Oppose stereotyped party writing. In Selected works of Mao Tse-tung (Vol. 3). Foreign Languages Press.
- Mao, Z. (1942, May). Talks at the Yenan Forum on Literature and Art. In Selected works of Mao Tse-tung (Vol. 3). Foreign Languages Press.
- Mao, Z. (1944, September 8). Serve the people. In Selected works of Mao Tse-tung (Vol. 3). Foreign Languages Press.
- Mao, Z. (1945, April 24). On coalition government. In Selected works of Mao Tse-tung (Vol. 3). Foreign Languages Press.
- Mao, Z. (1945, June 11). The foolish old man who removed the mountains. In Selected works of Mao Tse-tung (Vol. 3). Foreign Languages Press.
- Mao, Z. (1946, August). Talk with the American correspondent Anna Louise Strong. In Selected works of Mao Tse-tung (Vol. 4). Foreign Languages Press.
- Mao, Z. (1949, March 5). Report to the Second Plenary Session of the Seventh Central Committee of the Communist Party of China. In Selected works of Mao Tse-tung (Vol. 4). Foreign Languages Press.
- Mao, Z. (1949, June 30). On the people's democratic dictatorship. In Selected works of Mao Tse-tung (Vol. 4). Foreign Languages Press.
- Mao, Z. (1949, August 18). Farewell, Leighton Stuart!. In Selected works of Mao Tse-tung (Vol. 4). Foreign Languages Press.
- Mao, Z. (1949, September 21). The Chinese people have stood up!. In Selected works of Mao Tsetung (Vol. 5). Foreign Languages Press.
- Mao, Z. (1956, April 25). On the ten major relationships. In Selected works of Mao Tsetung (Vol. 5). Foreign Languages Press.
- Mao, Z. (1957, February 27). On the correct handling of contradictions among the people. In Selected works of Mao Tsetung (Vol. 5). Foreign Languages Press.
- Mao, Z. (1957, November 18). All reactionaries are paper tigers. In Selected works of Mao Tsetung (Vol. 5). Foreign Languages Press.
- Mao, Z. (1958, February 2). Sixty points on working methods: A draft resolution from the Office of the Centre of the CPC. In Selected works of Mao Tse-tung (Vol. 8). Marxists Internet Archive.
- Mao, Z. (1959, July 23). Speech at the Lushan Conference. In Selected works of Mao Tse-tung (Vol. 8). Marxists Internet Archive.
- Mao, Z. (1962, January 30). Talk at an enlarged working conference convened by the Central Committee of the Communist Party of China. In Selected works of Mao Tse-tung (Vol. 8). Marxists Internet Archive.
- Mao, Z. (1963, May). Where do correct ideas come from?. In Selected works of Mao Tse-tung (Vol. 9). Marxists Internet Archive.
- Mao, Z. (1964, August 18). Talk on questions of philosophy. In Selected works of Mao Tse-tung (Vol. 9). Marxists Internet Archive.
- Mao, Z. (1966, August 5). Bombard the headquarters: My first big-character poster. In Selected works of Mao Tse-tung (Vol. 9). Marxists Internet Archive.

== Collections and translations ==
- Mao, Z. (1961). Mao Tse-tung on guerrilla warfare (S. B. Griffith, Trans.). Praeger. (Original work published 1937)
- Mao, Z. (1963). Selected military writings of Mao Tse-tung. Foreign Languages Press.
- Mao, Z. (1965). Selected works of Mao Tse-tung (Vols. 1–4). Foreign Languages Press.
- Mao, Z. (1966). Basic tactics (S. R. Schram, Trans.). Praeger. (Original work published 1937)
- Mao, Z. (1966). Quotations from Chairman Mao Tse-tung. Foreign Languages Press.
- Mao, Z. (1972). The poems of Mao Tse-tung (W. Barnstone & Ko C., Trans.). Harper & Row.
- Mao, Z. (1974). Chairman Mao talks to the people: Talks and letters, 1956–1971 (S. Schram, Ed.; J. Chinnery & Tieyun, Trans.). Pantheon.
- Mao, Z. (1977). A critique of Soviet economics (M. Roberts, Trans.). Monthly Review Press.
- Mao, Z. (1977). Selected works of Mao Tsetung (Vol. 5). Foreign Languages Press.
- Mao, Z. (1989). The secret speeches of Chairman Mao: From the Hundred Flowers to the Great Leap Forward (R. MacFarquhar, T. Cheek, & E. Wu, Eds.). Council on East Asian Studies, Harvard University.
- Mao, Z. (1990). Report from Xunwu (R. R. Thompson, Trans.). Stanford University Press.
- Mao, Z. (1986–1992). The writings of Mao Zedong, 1949–1976 (M. Y. M. Kau & J. K. Leung, Eds.; Vols. 1–2). M. E. Sharpe.
- Mao, Z. (1992–2023). Mao's road to power: Revolutionary writings, 1912–1949 (S. R. Schram, N. J. Hodes, T. Cheek, N. Hearst, & J. Fewsmith, Eds.; Vols. 1–10). M. E. Sharpe; Routledge.

== See also ==
- Bibliography of the Chinese Civil War
- Outline of the Chinese Civil War
- Timeline of the Chinese Civil War
