= Early life of Mao Zedong =

Mao Zedong
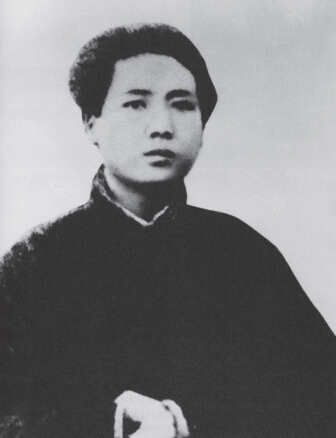
- Mao in 1920
- Born: December 26, 1893; Shaoshanchong, Shaoshan, Qing China
- Died: September 9, 1976 (aged 82); Beijing, China
- Occupations: Communist revolutionary, politician, and socio-political theorist

The early life of Chinese revolutionary and politician Mao Zedong covered the first 27 years of his life, from 1893 to 1919. Born in Shaoshanchong, Shaoshan in Hunan province, Mao grew up as the son of Mao Yichang, a wealthy farmer and landowner. Sent to the local Shaoshan Primary School, Mao was brought up in an environment of Confucianism, but reacted against this from an early age, developing political ideas from modern literature. Aged 13 his father organised a marriage for him with Luo Yigu, the daughter of another land-owning family, but Mao denounced the marriage and moved away from home.

In 1911 Mao began further education in the Hunanese capital of Changsha, where he came under the influence of republicanism, and became an admirer of republican revolutionary Sun Yat-Sen. When the Xinhai Revolution broke out between republicans and monarchists, Mao signed up as a soldier, although conflict subsided and he left the army after six months. Seeing himself as an intellectual, he became heavily influenced by classical liberalism, and began studying at the First Normal School of Changsha, as well as penning his first publications. With Xiao Zisheng he co-founded the Renovation of the People Study Society in April 1918 to discuss and perpetuate revolutionary ideas among students, before graduating in 1919.

== Childhood ==
Mao biographer Lee Feigon asserted that Mao experienced "a relatively typical childhood". He commented that it was for this reason that previous biographers had found it difficult to "find something fundamentally wrong with Mao from an early age" with which they had hoped to explain his later development into "a revolutionary tyrant".

=== Birth: 1893 ===
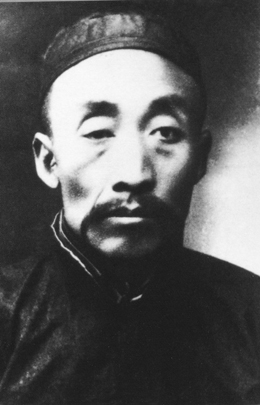
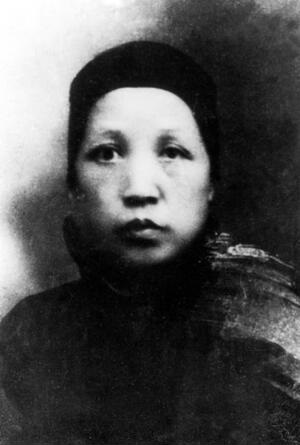
Mao Zedong's parents: Mao Yichang (left) and Wen Qimei (right)

Mao was born on December 26, 1893, in his familiar home in the rural village of Shaoshanchong in Xiangtan county, Hunan Province, part of south-central China. Typical of many Hunanese villages, Shaoshanchong was situated in a narrow valley surrounded by mountains. Both the village and the nearest town, Shaoshan, were named for the local Shaoshan Mountain ("Music Mountain"), a prominent feature in the local landscape with sacred associations for the region's Buddhists. The village was inhabited by many individuals with the surname of Mao; the Mao clan traced their lineage back to Mao Taihua, a warrior from Jiangxi Province who had moved to Xiangtan county in the mid-fourteenth century after fighting for Zhu Yuanzhang's military campaign to overthrow the Mongol-governed Yuan dynasty.

Mao's father, Mao Yichang, had been born in Shaoshanchong to a family of poverty before undergoing an arranged marriage to Mao's mother, Wen Qimei, when he was fifteen years old. While Yichang had received two years of schooling and could read and write, conversely Qimei was illiterate. Serving for several years in the regional Xiang Army, Yichang saved up his wages and on leaving the army used these to pay off his family's debts and purchase the lands that his father had sold. By the time of Zedong's birth, Yichang owned two-and-a-half acres of rice paddy, which would have been considered a substantial amount by the standards of the region. Through frugal living and hard work, over the coming years he was able to purchase a further acre and employ two farm laborers, with his farm encompassing a cow shed, a grain storage hut, a pigsty, and a small mill. Expanding the family's wealth, Yichang purchased mortgages on other peasants' land, thus becoming their landlord, while also purchasing the grain from the poorest farmers in the village before selling it on for a profit at the county seat of Xiangtan. In doing so, he amassed a fortune of two to three thousand Chinese silver dollars at a time when the majority of China's peasantry continued to live in poverty. This being the case, Mao biographer Philip Short could assert that the Mao family were "comfortably off" by the standards of the period.

According to the traditional lunar-based Chinese calendar, Mao Zedong's birth fell on the ninth day of the eleventh month of the Year of the Snake. After the birth, Mao's mother – who had previously birthed two sons who had died in infancy – was worried for his welfare, and consulted a Buddhist nun who lived as a hermit in the mountains for advice. The nun recommended that prayers be said for the child; doing so, Qimei then prostrated herself at a local temple dedicated to the Buddhist Bodhisattva Guanyin, requesting that the Bodhisattva become Zedong's foster-mother.

"Zedong's upbringing was secure. Other boys of the same era could expect less than Zedong got. He did not go hungry. His clothes were few but they were not rags. His mother put order and dignity into the life of the household. Zedong's big problem was his father. His yearnings were of the spirit."

— Ross Terrill, 1980.

Several biographers have suggested it likely that local traditional customs would have been observed after the birth; in this circumstance, a rooster would have been presented to his parents, while Mao would probably not have been bathed until three days after the birth, an event which would have been the first culturally-appropriate opportunity for guests to view the child. The child's father was expected to add onion and ginger to the bath water, symbolizing mind and health, while also providing sacrifices to the spirits of the ancestors. A Daoist fortune-teller was then employed to draw up a horoscope for the child, which revealed that he was lacking in the water element; Mao was therefore given the personal name of Zedong because according to Hunanese custom the character of ze ("to anoint") was deemed to correct this deficiency. The character of ze however had a dual meaning; as well as referring to moisture, it also implied kindness and beneficence. Yichang chose the latter part of his son's name, dong ("east"), so that the child's name would mean "benefactor of the east".

According to traditional custom, the child was also given a second, unofficial name to be used on specific ceremonial occasions; this was Runzhi. His mother gave him a third name, shisanyazi ("the Third Child Named Stone"), which reflected that he was her third child while also protecting him from misfortune and linking to the protection offered by Guanyin. If traditional Hunanese customs were adhered to, the baby's head would have been shaved after four weeks, with a small tuft of hair left on the crown and at the nape of the neck; it was at this point that the child would have been officially given its name. According to tradition, visitors probably would have gathered for this ceremony, bringing gifts of money, pork, fish, fruit, and decorated eggs.

=== Growing up: 1893–1900 ===
The Mao family lived in a clay-brick farmhouse constructed in 1878, although Yichang expanded it during Zedong's boyhood. They occupied the eastern wing of their house, with the neighboring Zou family living in the western half. The building was large enough for Zedong to be allocated his own room, a rarity at the time. In front of the house was a pond and a rice paddy, while pine and bamboo groves grew behind the building. The household included his paternal grandfather, Mao Enpu, who died when Mao was ten. His paternal grandmother, Liu, had died in 1884, nine years before Mao's birth. When Zedong was two years old, his mother gave birth to another son, her fourth child, Mao Zemin, and still another son, Mao Zetan, was born when Zedong was eleven. She also gave birth to two daughters, both of whom died in infancy, although soon after Zetan's birth the couple adopted a baby girl, Zejian, the daughter of one of Mao's paternal uncles.

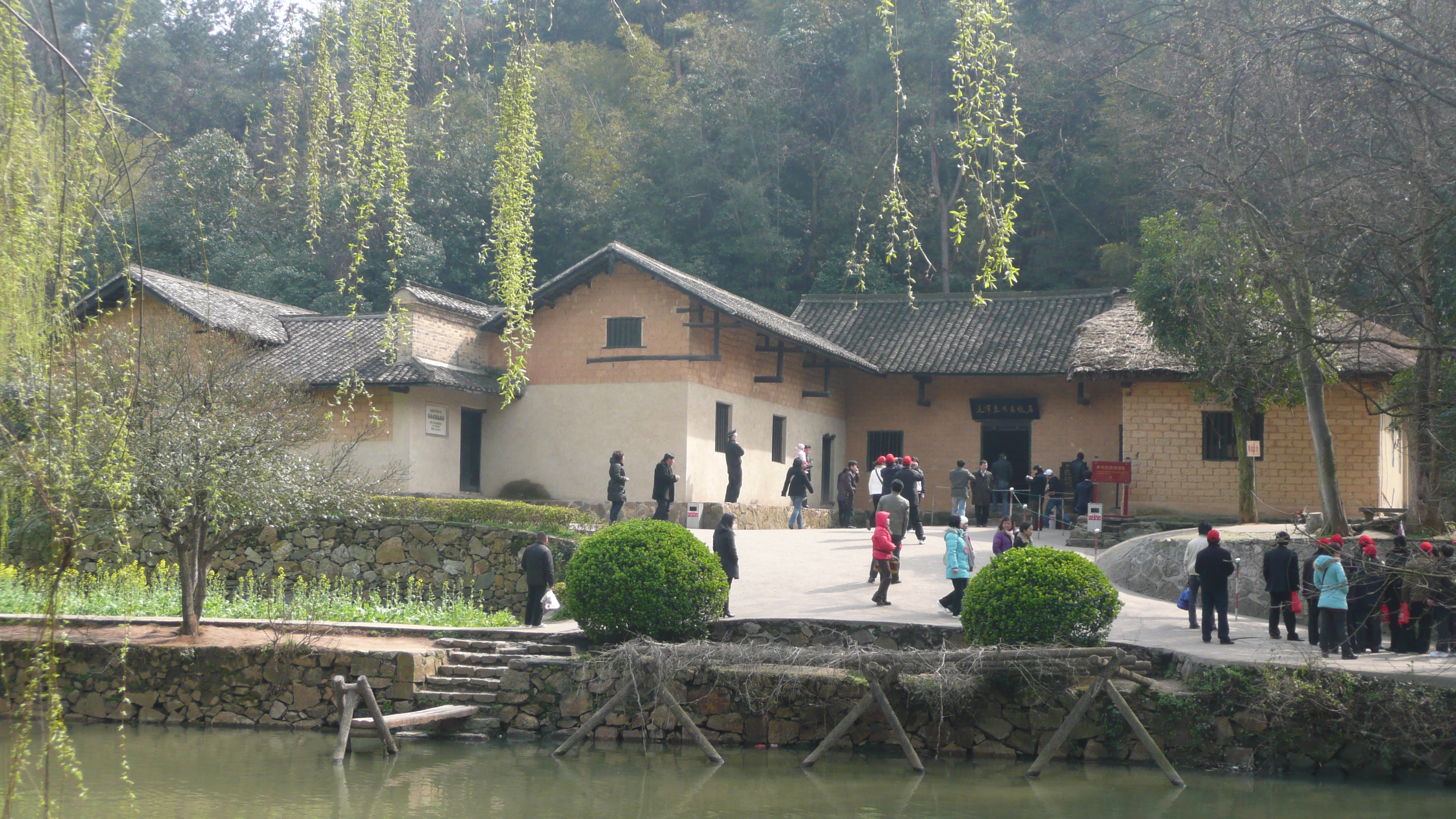
Mao's childhood home in Shaoshanchong, in 2010, by which time it had become a tourist destination

As was common at the time, Mao began to help on the farm at age five or six, watching over the cattle and tending ducks. Mao's habits were formed by his farm background; biographer Stuart Schram suggested that this took the form of a "lack of social graces and of a concern either for comfort or appearances." In later life, Mao would never become accustomed to the use of a toothbrush, instead retaining the habit of washing his mouth out with tea. Similarly, he continued to prefer cleaning himself with a steaming towel than with soap and water, again reflecting his upbringing. Further, the Hunanese cuisine of his youth gave him his lifelong love of spicy food.

Qimei was a practising Buddhist, and encouraged her sons to follow Buddhist teachings; embracing this faith, Zedong often accompanied her on visits to the local Buddhist temple, influencing her hopes that he would become a monk. Conversely, Yichang was largely irreligious, although after surviving an encounter with a tiger, gave offerings to the gods in thanks. According to Mao's account, Yichang was a staunch disciplinarian, and would beat his children as punishment for disobedience and a perceived lack of filial piety, with Mao describing the beating he received on one occasion when he humiliated his father in public. He added that his mother would often try to protect her children from these beatings.

During the 1930s, Mao would claim that he resented his father, viewing him as stingy and unaffectionate. He contrasted this with the affection he received from his mother, thus adopting a Marxist dialectical perspective by dividing the family into two camps: his mother and himself on one side, his father on another. Biographers have interpreted this filial relationship in different ways; while Jung Chang and Jon Halliday stated that "Mao hated his father", conversely, Schram pointed out that even in Mao's accounts of Yichang, his description is nuanced, and "not simply one of unremitting hatred". Ross Terrill suggested that "Behind Zedong's expressed hatred of his father was an unacknowledged identification; he was driven to become an authoritarian like his father, and on a far grander scale." Feigon has questioned the veracity of Mao's account of this issue, suggesting that the alleged bad relationship between the two was "probably overstated"; highlighting that Yichang clearly went to great efforts to financially support his son, Feigon also noted that the anti-father trope was "wildly popular among young Chinese intellectuals" during the 1930s, and that Mao's account hence may well be a reflection of this rather than reality.

=== Shaoshan Primary School: 1901–1906 ===
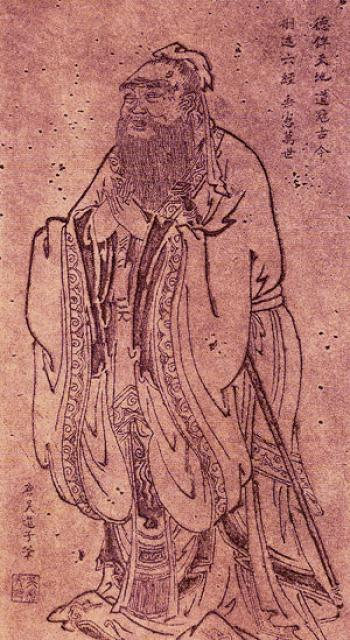
Mao was educated in the writings of Confucius (pictured) although biographers differ over the extent to which it influenced him

Yichang was keen for his eldest son to gain a basic education rooted in Confucianism, the dominant moral ideology of Chinese society; he deemed a knowledge of Confucian teaching to be essential in allowing his son to develop key business and administrative skills. His hope was that Zedong would gain an apprenticeship with a Xiangtan rice merchant before taking over the family business and supporting his parents during their old age. Yichang was particularly adamant on the need to learn about Confucianism after losing a lawsuit over a parcel of land; he believed that his opponent had been victorious in the dispute as a result of their ability to quote the sayings of ancient Chinese philosopher Confucius throughout their argument.

Thus, from the age of eight, Mao was sent to gain a basic education at the private Shaoshan Primary School. Adopting a traditional syllabus and method of education, the school emphasised the copying and recitation by rote of a series of classical Chinese texts preaching Confucian morals: the Three Character Classic, the Book of Names, the Thousand Character Classic, the Odes for Children, the Filial Classic, and Filial Learning. Perceived failure or disobedience resulted in beatings with a bamboo rod from the teacher, who like Mao's father was a stern disciplinarian. Disliking this mode of education, Mao later asserted that "I hated Confucius from the age of eight." Although expressing his dislike for them, Mao nevertheless accepted the utility of learning these texts, finding himself able to win arguments – including those against his father – by the selective use of Confucian quotations.

Far more to Mao's liking were the accounts of war and banditry found in the Four Great Classical Novels, including Romance of the Three Kingdoms, Journey to the West, and Water Margin; while also steeped in Confucian morality, they emphasised the need to fight for justice in society, and it is possible that these texts inspired his interest in history. According to his later account, it was at this point that he attained a strong belief in justice; he began to divide his lunch in two to share with a poorer boy who could not afford food. On another occasion, he got into a physical fight with an older classmate; this greatly upset his mother, who held pacifist beliefs. According to his later account, at one point he rebelled when the teacher tried to punish him for disobedience; rather than permitting himself to be beaten with a rod, he marched out of the school and into the wooded mountains. He remained there for three days, until being discovered by a family member and brought home.

Despite this education, biographers Alexander Pantsov and Steven Levine commented that the "moral-ethical precepts of Confucius seem to have left not a trace in his soul". Conversely, biographer Philip Short asserted that for Mao, as for all Chinese children who went underwent traditional education, these Confucian texts "fixed the underlying pattern of [his] thought for the rest of his life". Short went so far as to suggest that Confucianism would prove to be "at least as important to [Mao] as Marxism", noting that even in later life, Mao's speeches contained a greater number of quotations from Confucius and other ancient Chinese philosophers than from major Marxist theoreticians Karl Marx and Vladimir Lenin.

=== Marriage and secondary education: 1907–1911 ===
Aged thirteen, Mao left Shaoshan Primary School, pleased to have gotten away from what he saw as its oppressive atmosphere. The decision had been made by his father, who wanted Mao to devote his attentions to the family business by working on the farm and managing the financial accounts. However, relations between him and his father became increasingly strained. Mao continued to read in his free time, often staying up late at night in his bedroom to read by candle light; this angered his father, who saw recreational reading as an unproductive pursuit. At this point he read a book which inspired his interest in politics: Zheng Guanying's Sheng-shih Wei-yen ("Words of Warning to an Affluent Age"). Published in 1893, the book lamented the deterioration of Chinese power in East Asia, and argued for technological, economic and political reform, believing that China could be strengthened if it abandoned its absolute monarchy and politically modelling itself on the representative democracies and constitutional monarchies of the Western world. His political views were shaped by protests – led by the Gelaohui, or Elder Brother Society – which erupted following a famine in Hunanese capital Changsha; Mao supported the protesters' demands, but the armed forces suppressed the dissenters and executed their leaders. The famine spread to Shaoshan, where starving peasants seized his father's grain; disapproving of their actions as morally wrong, Mao nevertheless claimed sympathy for their situation.

Yichang decided to organise an arranged marriage for Mao, selecting for him the seventeen-year-old Luo Yixiu, the daughter of a local landowner. Although unhappy with the arrangement, Mao agreed to go through with the marriage, with the wedding taking place in 1907 or 1908. According to his later account however, he never consummated the marriage and refused to live with Luo. Instead, he claimed that he made use of connections with his maternal family to leave his parental home and move into the house of an unemployed student in Shaoshan, where he lived for a year. There, he continued his reading, enjoying tales of ancient Chinese rulers such as Sima Qian's Records of the Grand Historian and Ban Gu's History of the former Han dynasty. He was also influenced by Feng Guifen's Personal Protests from the Study of Jiao Bin, which had been compiled in 1861. Like Guanying's book, it called on China to adopt foreign techniques to strengthen itself, and to use them to defend itself from foreign aggression. Mao also read a pamphlet by the Chinese revolutionary Chen Tianhua, which recounted China's loss of sovereignty to Japanese and European imperialists; Mao claimed that this was a great influence on him, for after reading it "I felt depressed about the future of my country and began to realize that it was the duty of all the people to help save it." Meanwhile, Luo was locally disgraced and eventually died of dysentery in 1910, while Qimei moved to live with her brother's family in her native village of Xiangxiang.

In the autumn of 1910, Mao requested that his father permit him to attend the Dongshan Higher Primary School, which was located fifteen miles from Shaoshan; unlike the Shaoshan Primary School, this establishment taught modern subjects such as natural sciences. Yichang agreed to fund his son's tuition and dormitory space, and so the sixteen-year-old Mao set off to Dongshan with his older cousin, Wen Yunchang, who was also enrolled there. His two best friends at the school were Yunchang and Xiao Zizhang (also known as Xiao San), who would later join Mao in the communist movement and would become one of his first biographers. However, he was bullied for being rural and unsophisticated by many of his classmates, who were typically the sons of wealthy landlords from the Xiangxiang district. He nevertheless proved to be a successful student, gaining the respect of his teachers through hard work, an ability to compose essays in the classical style, and voracious reading. Here, he first learned about geography, and increased his knowledge of ancient Chinese history. He began to read too about foreign history, coming to be particularly influenced by a book titled Great Heroes of the World, through which he learned about – and was inspired by – the military prowess and nationalistic fervour of American George Washington and Frenchman Napoleon Bonaparte. Schram believed that it was here, at this school, that "we can date the real beginnings of Mao's intellectual and political development". Mao remained at the school for seven or eight months, before deciding to enroll at a middle school in the provincial capital of Changsha.

== Early adulthood and politicization ==
=== Xinhai Revolution: 1911–1912 ===
In 1911, Mao convinced his father to allow him to attend middle school in Changsha. The city was "a revolutionary hotbed", with widespread animosity towards the absolute monarchy of Emperor Puyi. While some advocated a reformist transition to a constitutional monarchy, most revolutionaries advocated republicanism, arguing for an elected presidency. The primary figurehead behind the republican movement was Sun Yat-sen, an American-educated Christian who led a secret society known as the Tongmenghui. At Changsha, Mao came under the influence of Sun's newspaper, The People's Independence (Minli bao), penning his first political essay, which he stuck to the school wall; later admitting it was "somewhat muddled", it involved the creation of a republic governed by Sun, but with concessions made to the moderates by having Kang Youwei as premier and Liang Qichao as minister of foreign affairs. As a symbol of rebellion against the Manchu monarch, he and a friend cut off their queue pigtails—a sign of subservience to the emperor—before forcibly cutting off those of several classmates.

Inspired by Sun's republicanism, the army rose up against the emperor across southern China, sparking the Xinhai Revolution. Changsha initially remained under monarchist control, with the governor proclaiming martial law to quell protest. When the infantry brigade guarding the city defected to the revolution, the governor fled, leaving the city in republican hands. Supporting the revolution, Mao joined the rebel army as a private soldier, but was not involved in the fighting. The northern provinces remained loyal to the emperor, and hoping to avoid a civil war, Sun Yat-sen—proclaimed "provisional president" by his supporters—compromised with the monarchist general Yuan Shikai. The monarchy would be abolished, creating the Republic of China, but the monarchist Yuan would become president. The Xinhai Revolution over, Mao resigned from the army in 1912, after six months of being a soldier. Around this time, Mao discovered socialism from a newspaper article; proceeding to read pamphlets by Jiang Kanghu, the student founder of the Chinese Socialist Party, Mao remained interested yet unconvinced by the idea.

=== Fourth Normal School of Changsha: 1912–1917 ===
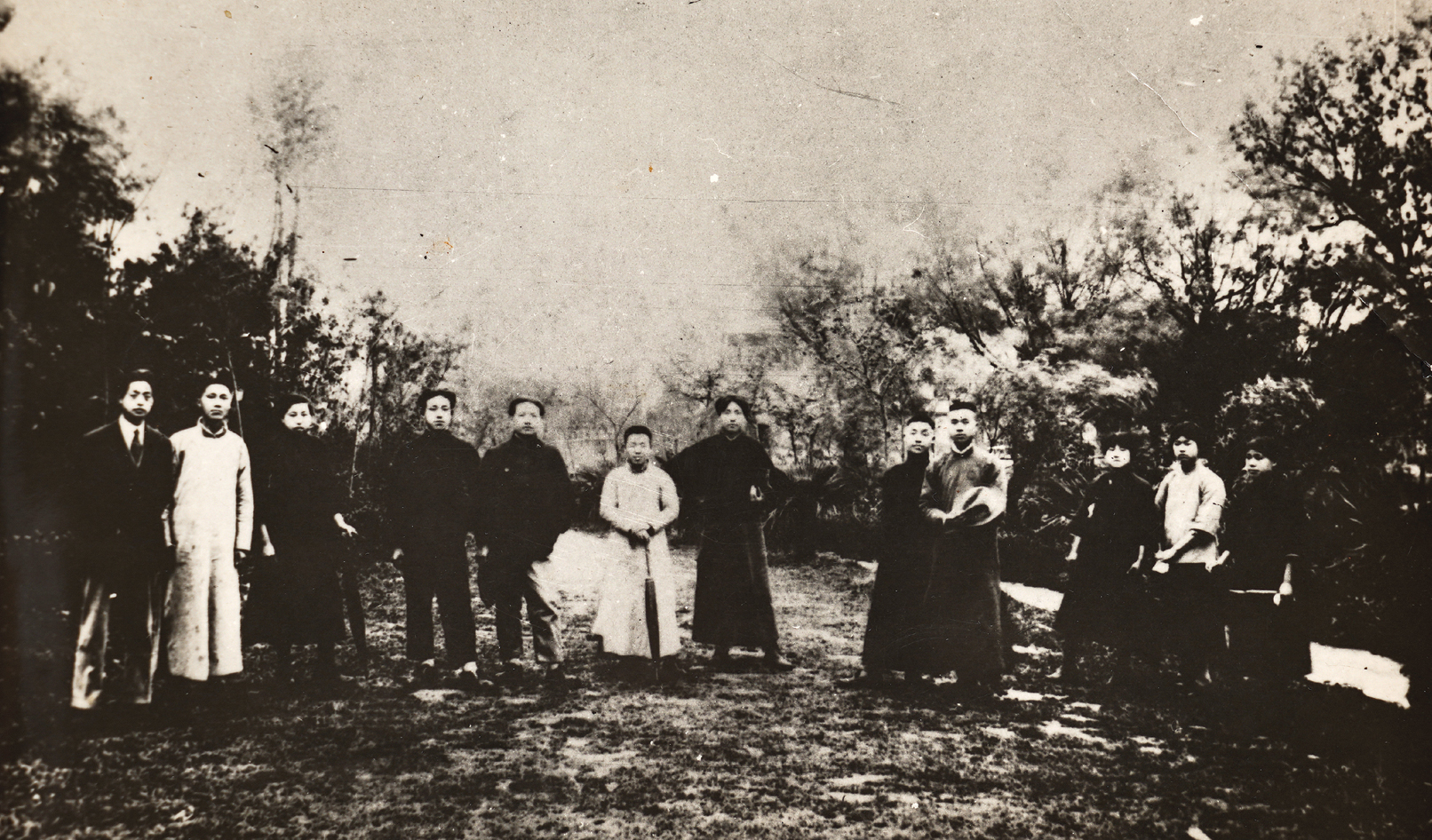
Members of the New Youth Society

Returning to education, Mao enrolled and dropped out of a police academy, a soap-production school, a law school and an economics school. His father only approved of the latter, but the lectures were in English, which Mao didn't understand, and so Mao abandoned it for the government-run Changsha Middle School; he soon dropped out of this too, finding it rooted in Confucianism. Undertaking his studies independently, he spent much time in the Changsha public library, reading core works of classical liberalism such as Adam Smith's The Wealth of Nations and Montesquieu's The Spirit of the Laws, as well as the works of western scientists and philosophers such as Charles Darwin, J.S. Mill, Jean-Jacques Rousseau, and Herbert Spencer. Viewing himself as an intellectual, years later he admitted that at this time he thought himself better than working people. Inspired by the work of Friedrich Paulsen, the liberal emphasis on individualism led Mao to believe that strong individuals were not bound by moral codes but should strive for the greater good; that the end justifies the means. Seeing no use in his son's intellectual pursuits, Mao's father cut off his allowance, forcing Mao to move into a hostel for the destitute.

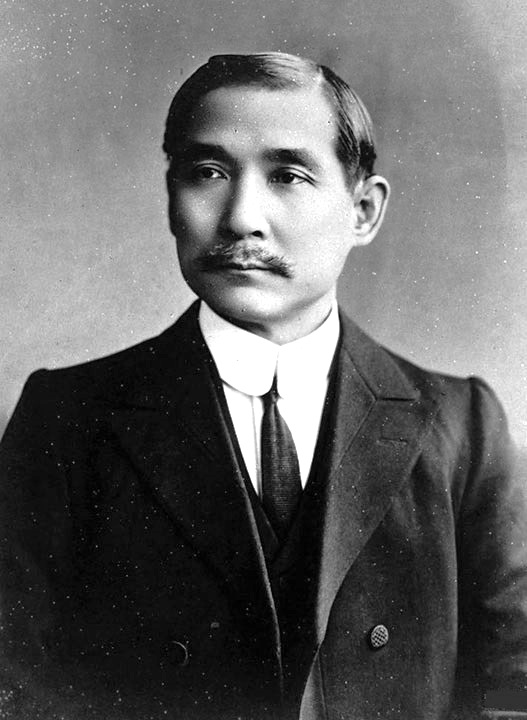
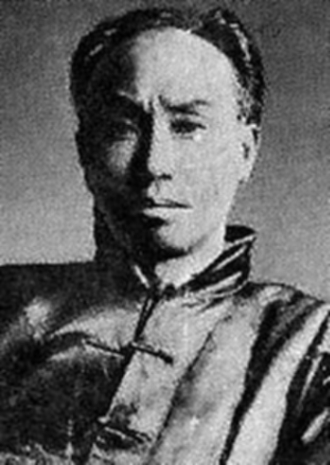
In early life, Mao was influenced by the publications of two revolutionaries, Sun Yat-sen (left) and Chen Duxiu (right), both of whom argued that China had to adopt various western political philosophies in order to modernise.

Desiring to become a teacher, Mao enrolled at a teacher training college, the Fourth Normal School of Changsha, which had high standards, yet low fees and cheap accommodation. Several months later, it merged with the First Normal School of Changsha, widely seen as the best school in Hunan. Befriending Mao, Professor of Ethics Yang Changji urged him to read a radical newspaper, New Youth (Xin qingnian), the creation of his friend Chen Duxiu, Dean of the Faculty of Letters at Peking University. Although a Chinese nationalist, Chen argued that China must look to the west, adopting "Mr. Democracy and Mr. Science" in order to cleanse itself of superstition and autocracy. Mao published his first article, "A Study of Physical Culture", in New Youth in April 1917, instructing readers to increase their physical strength to serve the revolution. He joined The Society for the Study of Wang Fuzhi (Chuan-shan Hsüeh-she), a revolutionary group founded by Changsha literati who wished to emulate Wang Fuzhi, a philosopher who symbolized Han resistance to Manchu invasion.

In his first school year, Mao befriended an older student, Xiao Zisheng; together they went on a walking tour of Hunan, begging and writing literary couplets to obtain food. A popular student, Mao remained active in school politics, and in 1915 was elected secretary of the Students Society. He used his position to forge an Association for Student Self-Government, leading protests against school rules. In spring 1917, he was elected to command the students' volunteer army, set up to defend the school from marauding warlord soldiers and bandits, arming these troops with makeshift bamboo spears and wooden rifles. Increasingly interested in the techniques of war, he took a keen interest in the events of World War I, but also began to develop a sense of solidarity with workers. Mao undertook feats of physical endurance with Xiao Zisheng and Cai Hesen, describing themselves as the "Three Heroes," a sobriquet taken from the Romance of the Three Kingdoms. With other young revolutionaries they formed the Renovation of the People Study Society in April 1918 to debate Chen Duxiu's ideas. Desiring personal and societal transformation, the Society gained between 70 and 80 members, including some females, many of whom would go on to join the Communist Party. Mao graduated in June 1919, being ranked third in the year.
