= Mao (surname) =

Mao/毛, 茅 etc.

Origin
- Language: Chinese

Other names
- Variant forms: Ma, Mu

Mao is the romanization of several Chinese family names, including common names 毛 (Máo), 茅 (Máo) and some rare names 茆 (Máo), 卯 (Mǎo), 貌 (Mào) etc.

Originated from 马/馬 (Ma), the clan name of Zhou dynasty. 毛 is the 106th surname in the Hundred Family Surnames, and ranks 87th largest number of people with this surname in China (2007).

茅 is the 119th surname in Hundred Family Surnames.

== Notable people surnamed Mao ==
=== 毛 ===
- Mao Chaofeng (b. 1965), executive vice governor of Hainan
- Mao Weiming (b. 1961), governor of Hunan since 2020
- Mao Wanchun (b. 1961), Chinese politician
- Mao Chi-kuo (b. 1948), a Republic of China politician
- Mao Jie (d. 216), a minister to Cao Cao
- Mao Sidi, pseudonym of Steven W. Mosher (born 1948), American social scientist and author
- Mao Wenlong (1576–1629), a commander of the Ming Dynasty
- Mao Zedong, (1893–1976), the founder of the People's Republic of China and chairman of the Chinese Communist Party
  - Madame Mao (Jiang Qing) (1914–1991), the fourth wife of Mao Zedong and a leading politician in the Cultural Revolution
  - Mao Zemin, (1896–1943), early Communist revolutionary, Mao Zedong's brother
  - Mao Zetan (1905–1935), brother of Mao Zedong
  - Mao Anying (1922–1950), the son of Mao Zedong
  - Mao Yuanxin (b. 1941), nephew of Mao Zedong
  - Mao Xinyu, (born 1970), grandson of Mao
  - Mao Zehong (1905–1929), the sister of Mao Zedong
- Mao Xiaobing (b. 1965), former party chief of Xining, investigated for corruption
- Mao Xiaoping (b. 1957), former mayor of Wuxi
- Mao Xinyuan (b 1971), a Chinese race walker
- Empress Mao (d. 237), Empress of Cao Wei during the Three Kingdoms era
- Teresa Mo (b. 1958), Hong Kong actress
- Mao WeiJia, singer
- Mao Yingchu, (1910–2000), an ace-fighter pilot during the War of Resistance/WWII; former commander of the 4th Fighter Group
- Mao Ning (diplomat) (born 1972)

=== 茅 ===
- Angela Mao (b. 1950), Taiwanese actress
- Mao Dun (1896–1981), pen name of a Chinese writer
- Mao Yisheng (1896–1989), a Chinese structural engineer.
- Mao Yushi (b. 1929), a Chinese economist, nephew of Mao Yisheng, critic of Mao Zedong.

== See also ==
- Mao (given name), a feminine Japanese given name
- Mow (surname)
