= 一秀 =

一秀 or 일수, meaning 'one, outstanding', may refer to:

- Isshu Sugawara (born 1962), Japanese politician
- Kazuhide, a masculine Japanese given name
- Luo Yixiu (1889–1910), the first wife of Chinese communist revolutionary and future leader of China
- Song Il-soo (born 1950), the manager of the Doosan Bears

== See also ==
- Isshu (disambiguation)
- Yixiu (disambiguation)
