= Family of Mao Zedong =

Mao 毛
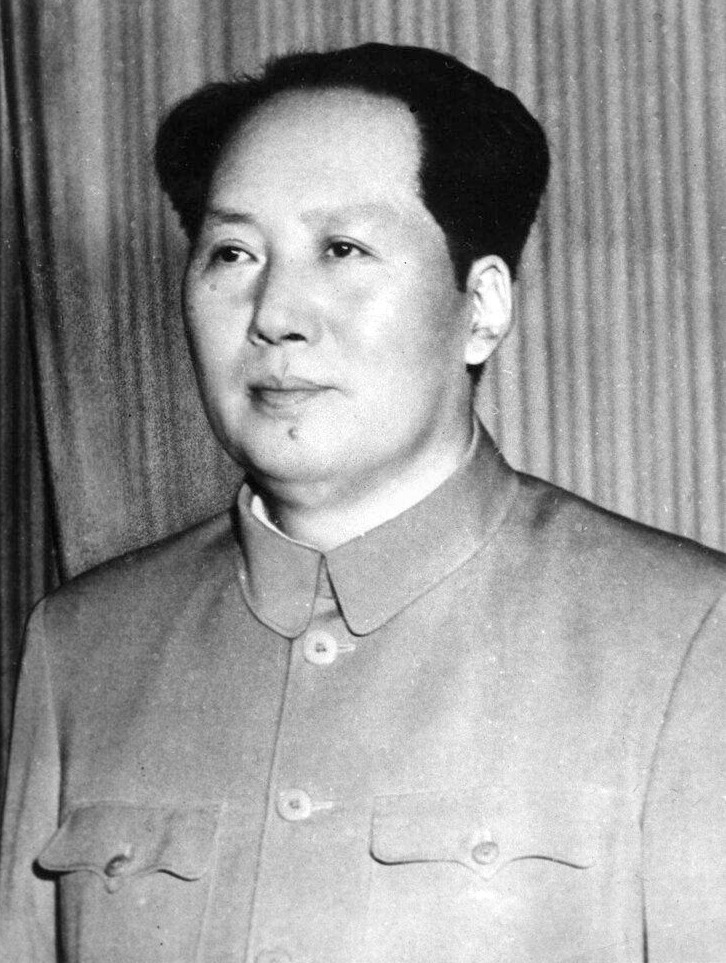
- Mao Zedong
- Current region: Hunan and Beijing
- Origin: Hunan
- Founder: Mao Zedong

The family of Mao Zedong is a prominent Chinese family. The most well-known member is Mao Zedong, leader of the Chinese Communist Party from around 1935 and a major leader of the People's Republic of China from its proclamation in 1949 until his death in 1976.

== Ancestors ==
Mao's ancestors were:

- Máo Yíchāng (毛貽昌, born Xiangtan 1870, died Shaoshan 1920), father, courtesy name Máo Shùnshēng (毛順生) or also known as Mao Jen-sheng
- Wén Qīmèi (文七妹, born Xiangxiang 1867, died 1919), mother. She was illiterate and a devout Buddhist. She was a descendant of Wen Tianxiang.
- Máo Ēnpǔ (毛恩普, born 1846, died 1904), paternal grandfather
- Liú (劉/刘, given name not recorded, born 1847, died 1884), paternal grandmother
- Máo Zǔrén (毛祖人), paternal great-grandfather

== Wives ==
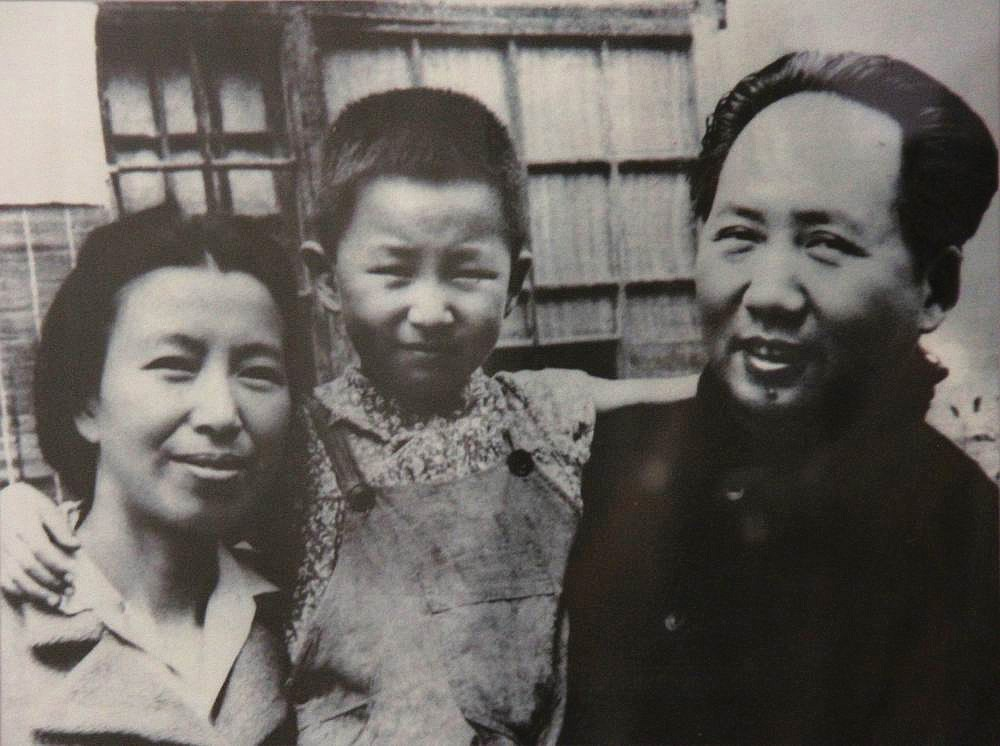
Mao with Jiang Qing and daughter Li Na in the 1940s

Mao had four wives who gave birth to a total of 10 children:

1. Luo Yixiu (1889–1910) of Shaoshan: married 1907 to 1910
2. Yang Kaihui (1901–1930) of Changsha: married 1920 to 1927, executed by the KMT in 1930; mother to Mao Anying, Mao Anqing, and Mao Anlong
3. He Zizhen (1910–1984) of Jiangxi: married May 1928 to 1937; mother to 6 children
4. Jiang Qing (1914–1991), married 1939 until Mao's death; mother to Li Na

== Siblings ==
Mao had several siblings:

- Mao Zemin (1896–1943), younger brother, executed by a warlord
- Mao Zetan (1905–1935), younger brother, executed by the KMT
- Mao Zejian (1905–1929), adopted sister, executed by the KMT

Mao's parents altogether had five sons and two daughters. Two of the sons and both daughters died young, leaving the three brothers Mao Zedong, Mao Zemin, and Mao Zetan. Like three of Mao Zedong's wives, Mao Zemin and Mao Zetan were communists. Like Yang Kaihui, both Mao Zemin and Mao Zetan were killed in warfare during Mao Zedong's lifetime. Note that the character zé (澤) appears in all of the siblings' given names; this is a common Chinese naming convention.

From the next generation, Mao Zemin's son Mao Yuanxin was raised by Mao Zedong's family, and he became Mao Zedong's liaison with the Politburo in 1975. In Li Zhisui's The Private Life of Chairman Mao, Mao Yuanxin played a role in the final power-struggles.

== Children ==
Mao had a total of ten children, including:

- Mao Anying (1922–1950): son to Yang, married to Liú Sīqí (劉思齊), killed in action during the Korean War
- Mao Anqing (1923–2007): son to Yang, married to Shao Hua, son Mao Xinyu, grandson Mao Dongdong
- Mao Anlong (1927–1931): son to Yang, died during the Chinese Civil War
- Yang Yuehua (楊月花; born March 1929), née Mao Jinhua, was born in Longyan, Fujian, China with family roots in Xiangtan, Hunan, China. The eldest daughter of Mao Zedong and his third wife He Zizhen. When she was born in 1929, the Chinese Communist Party was being chased by the Kuomintang army and Mao Zedong decided to leave Longyan and abandon his daughter. She was later adopted by a family surnamed Yang, who changed her name to Yang Yuehua. In 1973, He Minxue, Yang's mother's elder brother, met with Yang in Fuzhou and confirmed her identity. However, Yang never met with her parents before their death, for several reasons; allegedly Jiang Qing, Mao's fourth wife, forbade it. Mao's second daughter was also left to local villagers because it was too dangerous to raise them while fighting the Kuomintang and later the Japanese.
- Mao Anhong (born November 1932): son to He, left to Mao's younger brother Zetan and then to one of Zetan's guards when he went off to war, was never heard of again
- Li Min (b. 1936): daughter to He, married to Kǒng Lìnghuá (孔令華), son Kǒng Jìníng (孔繼寧), daughter Kong Dongmei (孔冬梅)
- Li Na (b. 1940): daughter to Jiang (whose birth surname was Lǐ, a name also used by Mao while evading the KMT), married to Wáng Jǐngqīng (王景清), son Wáng Xiàozhī (王效芝)

Their youngest daughter (born in early 1938 in Moscow after Mao separated) and one other child (born 1933) died in infancy. Two English researchers who retraced the entire Long March route in 2002–2003 located a woman whom they believe might well be one of the missing children abandoned by Mao to peasants in 1935. Ed Jocelyn and Andrew McEwen hope a member of the Mao family will respond to requests for a DNA test.

== Grandchildren ==
Through his ten children, Mao became grandfather to twelve grandchildren, many of whom he never knew. He has many great-grandchildren alive today. One of his granddaughters is businesswoman Kong Dongmei. His grandson Mao Xinyu is a general in the Chinese army. Both he and Kong have written books about their grandfather.

== Sources ==
- Li, Zhisui (1994). The Private Life of Chairman Mao: The Memoirs of Mao's Personal Physician. London: Random House. ISBN 978-0679764434.
- Pantsov, Alexander V.; Levine, Steven I. (2012). Mao: The Real Story. New York and London: Simon & Schuster. ISBN 978-1451654479.
- Spence, Jonathan (1999). Mao Zedong. Penguin Lives. New York: Viking Press. ISBN 978-0670886692.
