= Yixiu =

Yixiu may refer to:

- Luo Yixiu (Chinese: 羅一秀; 1889–1910), first wife of Mao Zedong
- Yixiu District (Chinese: 宜秀区), district of Anqing, Anhui, China
- Yìxiù (翼宿) or Wings, a Chinese constellation

== See also ==
- Yi (disambiguation)
- 一秀 (disambiguation)
