= Bancang =

Community in Kaihui, Hunan, China

Bancang (Chinese: 板仓社区) is a community of Kaihui town in Changsha County, Hunan province, China. It is the birthplace of Mao Zedong's second wife, Yang Kaihui.
