= Mouw =

Mouw is a Dutch surname. Notable people with the surname include:

- Johan Andreas Dèr Mouw (1863–1919), Dutch poet and philosopher
- Richard Mouw (born 1940), American theologian and philosopher

== See also ==
- Mow (surname)
