= Mao Anlong =

Third son of Mao Zedong

- 毛岸龙
- Born: 1927; Changsha, Hunan, Republic of China
- Died: 1931 (aged 3–4); Shanghai, Republic of China
- Parent(s): Mao Zedong (father); Yang Kaihui (mother)
- Relatives: Mao family

Mao Anlong (Chinese: 毛岸龙; pinyin: Máo Ànlóng; 1927–1931) was the third son of Mao Zedong and Yang Kaihui.

== Early life ==
Mao Anlong was born in 1927 in Hunan to Mao Zedong and Yang Kaihui, Mao's second wife. He had two older brothers, Mao Anying and Mao Anqing. When he was very young his father, Mao Zedong, left the family for his next wife, He Zizhen. Later, his mother was executed by a warlord, leaving Anlong and his siblings effectively orphaned. Upon being smuggled to Shanghai after his mother's execution, he and his siblings lived on the streets. Mao died from dysentery at the age of 3 or 4.

== Family ==
His mother was Yang Kaihui, and his father was Mao Zedong. His older brothers were Mao Anying, who died in 1950, and Mao Anqing, who died in 2007. His half siblings include Yang Yuehua, Li Min, and Li Na.

== Impostor ==
In the early 1990s, a flood of unapproved biographies of leaders appeared. One such "autobiography" was a supposed account by Mao Anlong of how he had not died and actually been forced into hiding by his father. This book was denounced by Mao Anqing.
