= Zhou Wennan =

Chinese judge and activist (1910–1992)

- 周文楠
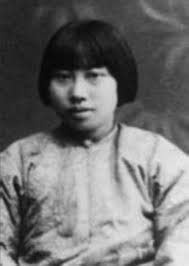
- Born: 1910; Guilin, Guangxi, Qing China
- Died: 5 September 1992 (aged 82); Harbin, Heilongjiang, China
- Occupations: Judge, revolutionist, politician
- Political party: Chinese Communist Party
- Spouses: Mao Zetan (m. 1926; div. 1927) Wang Yingqiao (1942–1992)
- Children: 1 (son)

Zhou Wennan
- Chinese: 周文楠
Transcriptions
Standard Mandarin
- Hanyu Pinyin: Zhōu Wénnán
- Wade–Giles: Chou1 Wen2-nan2

Zhou Runfang
- Simplified Chinese: 周润芳
- Traditional Chinese: 周潤芳
Transcriptions
Standard Mandarin
- Hanyu Pinyin: Zhōu Rùnfāng
- Wade–Giles: Chou1 Jun4-fang1

Zhou Wennan (Chinese: 周文楠; 1910 – 5 September 1992), also known as Zhou Runfang (周润芳), was a Chinese communist revolutionary and judge who served as the president of the civil tribunal of the higher people's court in Heilongjiang Province. She was the first wife of Mao Zetan, the younger brother of Mao Zedong.

== Early life ==
Zhou was born in 1910 in Guilin. Her father Zhou Mobin served as county magistrate. In her early years, Zhou and her mother Zhou Chenxuan joined the Chinese communist movement. In 1925, the mother and daughter assisted the Chinese Communist Party organization in underground work at their home in Changsha.

== Revolutionary career ==
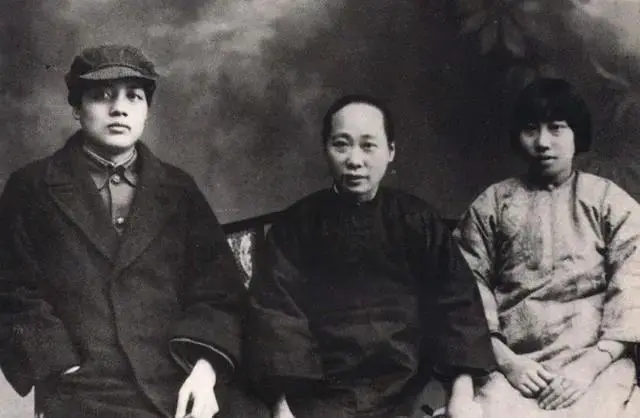
Zhou with her mother Zhou Chenxuan and husband Mao Zetan

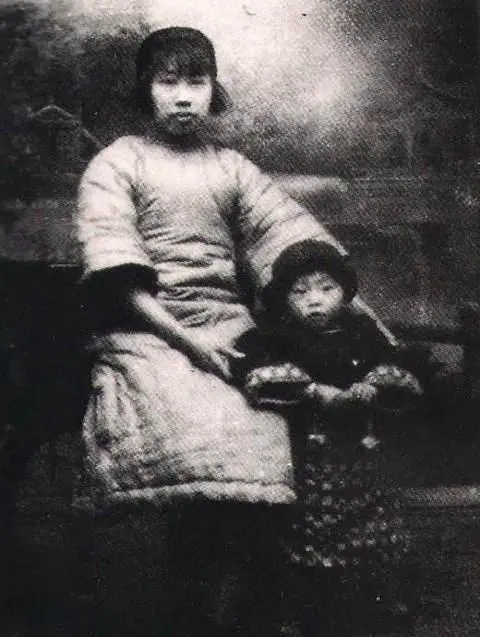
Zhou with her son Mao Chuxiong

During her underground work in Changsha was when she met Mao Zetan, the younger brother of Mao Zedong. In the autumn of 1925, Mao Zetan went to Guangzhou as part of underground communist work and in July of the following year, Zhou and her mother also went to Guangzhou where Zhou met Mao Zedong. With her mother's help, she and Mao Zetan got married that same year. After the Shanghai massacre in 1927, the situation of the underground communist network in Guangzhou worsened due to increased suppression of communist elements by the Kuomintang. As a result, Zhou and Mao moved to Shanghai and then to Wuhan while Zhou's mother returned to Changsha. After the establishment of Wuhan Nationalist government by Wang Jingwei and the subsequent purge of communists by the government, Mao Zetan was assigned by the Chinese Communist Party to Jiangxi to participate in the Nanchang Uprising and to follow with the Chinese Red Army troops to Jinggangshan. At this time, Zhou was about to give birth to her child and as a result, she broke up with Mao and returned to her home in Changsha, with her not maintaining subsequent connection with Mao for a while. On 8 September 1927, she gave birth to her son Mao Chuxiong. Shortly after giving birth, she continued with her underground work in Changsha.

In the spring of 1928, she was arrested by the Kuomintang and while in prison, she remained steadfast despite threats and torture, and her son was placed in a prison clinic to die. After several months, Zhou's mother managed to retrieve Mao Chuxiong and place him under her care. In 1930, Zhou was freed from prison after Red Army unit led by General Peng Dehuai entered Changsha. After being freed from prison, she briefly stayed in Changsha before joining Peng's army and then followed the army to the Jiangxi Soviet. There, she was arranged to study at the Military and Political School of the Third Army. After graduation, she was assigned to the political department of the Sixteenth Army to do propaganda work. In October 1934, the Red Army left Jiangxi as part of Long March while Zhou stayed in Jiangxi and engaged in guerrilla warfare at the Luoxiao Mountains. In the spring of 1935, during a guerrilla operation in Lianhua County in Jiangxi, she lost contact with the troops and was captured by local Kuomintang forces. However, she was quietly released during her transfer to a district office. In the winter of 1936, Zhou Wennan lost contact with the CCP and returned to Changsha where she lived in seclusion. On the same year, Mao Zetan was captured and executed while fighting Kuomintang forces in Jiangxi, covering the withdrawal of the Red Army during the Long March.

In the winter of 1937, the CCP discovered her whereabouts and arranged for her to work in the CCP Hunan Provincial Working Committee. Her mother and son were moved to Shaoshan. Soon after, in Yan'an, Mao Zedong learned about Zhou's conditions and wrote a letter to a relative, asking him to pass it on to Zhou. In the letter, he urged her to travel to Yan'an to study and to bring 20 silver dollars funded by the CCP for travel expenses. In 1940, after saying goodbye to her mother and son, Zhou went to Yan'an with Zhou Enlai through the Eighth Route Army office in Chongqing. At Yan'an, she was assigned to work as a teacher at the Central Nursery School. During this time, she gradually fell in love with Wang Yingqiao who worked with her. In order to remarry, Zhou had to request permission to do so from Mao Zedong and Mao granted her permission on the condition that Zhou would remember his brother Mao Zetan. In 1942, Wang and Zhou married.

In 1943, Zhou was transferred to Suide Experimental Primary School to continue her work as teacher. Following the end of the Second Sino-Japanese War after Japan surrendered in 1945, she and her husband went to Northeast China to continue with their communist underground work. In the same year, her son Mao Chuxiong joined the 120th Division of the Eighth Route Army led by General Wang Zhen. On 10 August 1946, Mao Chuxiong along with four other communist officials were invited by the Kuomintang to Xi'an to attend peace talks. On the way, they were intercepted by Kuomintang soldiers of the 181st Regiment commanded by Hu Zongnan. Mao and the four officials were betrayed by the Kuomintang who executed them by burying them alive in Ningshan County, Shaanxi. At that time, Zhou never knew the fate of her son and it was not until 1984 with the help of Revolutionary History Editorial Committee of the Henan-Hubei-Shaanxi Border Region, the Party History Office of Shangluo City and the Ningshan County Party Committee that the fate of Mao Chuxiong was uncovered.

== Later life ==
Following the founding of the People's Republic of China in 1949, she continued to serve in a variety of administrative positions. In 1950, following the outbreak of the Korean War, she was transferred to Tai'an from Shenyang in order to serve as the president of the county court. In the spring of 1952, she went to Qiqihar to serve as the president of the civil tribunal of the Heilongjiang Provincial Higher People's Court. In 1954, she was transferred to Harbin where she was elected to the Harbin CPPCC while concurrently holding her earlier position. When her mother died in 1968, she had her ashes buried next to Mao Zedong's former residence in Shaoshan, in accordance to her mother's wishes. Zhou retired in the early 1980s. She died of illness in Harbin on 5 September 1992, at the age of 82.

== Bibliography ==
- Pantsov, Alexander V.; Levine, Steven I. (2012) [2007: Russian-language edition]. Mao: The Real Story. Translated by Levine, Steven I. (First English hardcover ed.). New York: Simon and Schuster. ISBN 9781451654479. OCLC 772526023.
