= Baisha, Changsha =

Baisha Township 白沙乡
- Township
- Location in Hunan
- Coordinates: 28.5956°N 113.2821°E
- Country: China
- Province: Hunan
- Prefecture-level city: Changsha
- County: Changsha

Area
  - Total: 60.42 km^{2} (23.33 sq mi)
  - Land: 60.4 km^{2} (23.3 sq mi)
  - Water: 0.02 km^{2} (0.0077 sq mi)

Population (2000)
  - Total: 17,900
  - Density: 296/km^{2} (768/sq mi)
- Time zone: UTC+8 (China Standard)

Baisha Township (Chinese: 白沙乡) is a township in Changsha County, Changsha, Hunan Province, China. It administers ten villages and one community. Baisha town merged to Kaihui town on November 19, 2015.
