= Mow (surname) =

Mow is a Chinese surname shared by several notable people.

- Pang Tzu Mow, 毛邦初, (1904–1987), Chinese, Lt. General of the Republic of China Air Force
- William C. W. Mow, 毛昭寰, (born 1936), Chinese-American, entrepreneur and founder of the clothing company Bugle Boy, son of Lt. General Mow
- Van C. Mow, 毛昭憲, (born 1939), Chinese-American, biomechanics pioneer, son of Lt. General Mow

In these cases, the origin is through the Chinese hanzi 毛, where the use as a surname derives from the feudal title translated as "Earl Mao", establishing a relationship between the surnames "Mao" and "Mow" as having the same origin.

Another origin is through the traditional Chinese hanzi 憲, which has several meanings as both a verb and a noun.
