= Mao Zetan =

Younger brother of Mao Zedong

- 毛澤覃
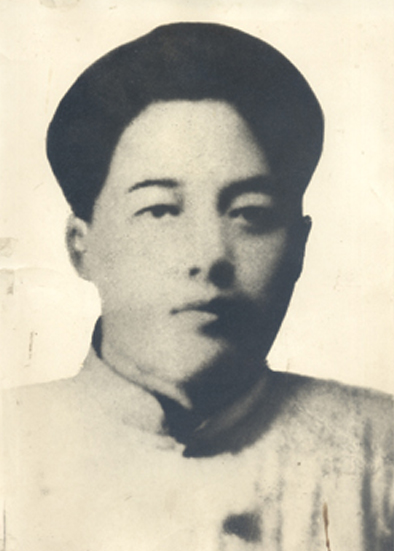
- Born: 25 September 1905; Xiangtan, Hunan, Great Qing
- Died: 25 April 1935 (aged 29); Ruijin, Jiangxi, Republic of China
- Cause of death: Executed by the Kuomintang
- Other name: Mao Zelin (毛泽淋)
- Occupation: Guerrilla soldier
- Spouses: Zhou Wennan (m. 1926; div. 1927) He Yi (1931–1935)
- Parent(s): Mao Yichang; Wen Qimei
- Relatives: Mao family

Mao Zetan
- Traditional Chinese: 毛澤覃
- Simplified Chinese: 毛泽覃
Transcriptions
Standard Mandarin
- Hanyu Pinyin: Máo Zétán
- Wade–Giles: Mao2 Tse2-t'an2

Mao Zelin
- Traditional Chinese: 毛澤淋
- Simplified Chinese: 毛泽淋
Transcriptions
Standard Mandarin
- Hanyu Pinyin: Máo Zélín
- Wade–Giles: Mao2 Tse2-lin2

Yongju
- Traditional Chinese: 詠菊
- Simplified Chinese: 咏菊
Transcriptions
Standard Mandarin
- Hanyu Pinyin: Yǒngjú
- Wade–Giles: Yung3-chü2

Runju
- Traditional Chinese: 潤菊
- Simplified Chinese: 润菊
Transcriptions
Standard Mandarin
- Hanyu Pinyin: Rùnjú
- Wade–Giles: Jun4-chü2

'Mao Zetan (Chinese: 毛澤覃, also named Mao Zelin (毛澤淋), courtesy name first Yongju (咏菊), then Runju (润菊), 25 September 1905 – 25 April 1935) was a Chinese communist revolutionary and Red Army commander, and the youngest brother of Mao Zedong. He joined the Chinese Communist Party (CCP) in 1923, took part in the Nanchang uprising in 1927, and helped arrange the meeting of the forces of Mao Zedong and Zhu De in the Jinggang Mountains in 1928. When the main Red Army left on the Long March in 1934, he stayed behind to lead guerrilla forces, and he was killed in a battle with Nationalist troops in Ruijin, Jiangxi, in April 1935, at the age of 29.

== Early life ==
Mao Zetan was born in September 1905 in Shaoshan, Hunan, about twelve years after his brother Mao Zedong. He was the youngest of the three Mao brothers, the other being Mao Zemin. At about the age of 13, he went to Changsha with Mao Zedong and enrolled at the primary school attached to the Hunan First Normal School. He joined the Socialist Youth League in 1921. While attending a private middle school in Changsha, he was introduced to Marxism by Mao Zedong, who had married Yang Kaihui, and he organized youth reading groups and distributed revolutionary materials.

== Revolutionary career ==
After the February Seventh Incident of 1923, the CCP sent Mao Zetan to organize workers at the Shuikoushan lead and zinc mine, and he joined the CCP in October 1923. In spring 1924, he returned to Changsha to work for the Youth League.

In August 1927, he took part in the Nanchang uprising as head of the propaganda section of the political department of the 25th Division. After the insurgents were defeated at Chaozhou and Shantou, he joined the remaining forces under Zhu De and Chen Yi. In November 1927, he was sent to Suichuan County as party representative of a guerrilla detachment, and on the way he reached Chaling, which Mao Zedong's forces had just taken, from where the local party sent him on to the Jinggang Mountains to meet his brother. He became the key liaison in arranging the union of the two forces, and Mao Zedong and Zhu De first met in late April 1928, before the two armies held a joint celebration in Ninggang County on 4 May.

In January 1930, Mao Zetan became director of the political department of the Red 6th Army, later renamed the Red 3rd Army, and in October 1930 he became party secretary of Ji'an County. In 1932, he became secretary-general of the CCP's Central Bureau of the Soviet Areas. Together with Deng Xiaoping, he opposed the "leftist" line associated with Wang Ming, and he took part in the Central Soviet's campaigns against the Nationalist encirclements. He was awarded the Red Star Medal, second class, for his battle record.

== Guerrilla war and death ==
When the main Red Army began the Long March in October 1934, after the defeat of the Fifth Encirclement Campaign, Mao Zetan stayed behind to lead guerrilla warfare. He became a member of the CCP Central Sub-Bureau, commander of an independent Red Army division and commander of the Fujian–Jiangxi Military Region.

On 25 April 1935, his guerrilla unit was surrounded by Nationalist troops in the Honglin mountains of Ruijin, Jiangxi, and he was mortally wounded while covering the escape of his comrades. A 2016 book about the three brothers by his grand-nephew Mao Xinyu gives the date as 26 April 1935 and the place as Huangtiankeng village in the Honglin mountains. A statue of him stands at the Ruijin Revolutionary Martyrs Memorial Hall, and its inscription describes him as an outstanding member of the CCP, an outstanding commander of the Red Army and a steadfast communist fighter.

== Personal life ==
Mao Zetan's first marriage, to Zhao Xiangui, was arranged by his parents in his home village. He later married Zhou Wennan, but because of his revolutionary work the marriage came to exist in name only. Their son, Mao Chuxiong, was born in 1927. Mao Chuxiong was killed in 1946, at the age of 19, at Wenjiamiao in Zhen'an County, Shaanxi, by a local official of the Nationalist regime, while his unit was breaking out northwards.

With the party's approval, Mao Zetan married He Yi, a younger sister of He Zizhen, on 20 July 1931. In 1934, He Yi offered that she and Mao Zetan would look after Mao Zedong and He Zizhen's young son, Mao Anhong, who had been born in 1932, and the child was later left with local villagers.

== See also ==
- Mao Zemin
- Mao Zejian
- Yang Kaihui
- Mao Anying
