= Mao Yichang =

Father of Mao Zedong (1870–1920)

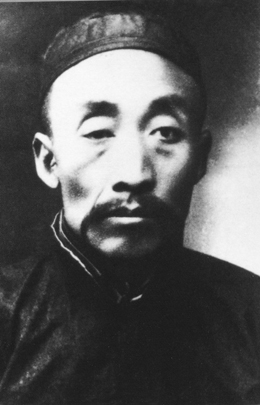
- Born: 15 October 1870; Shaoshan, Hunan, China
- Died: 23 January 1920 (aged 49); Shaoshan, Hunan, China
- Occupations: Farmer, grain merchant
- Spouse: Wen Qimei
- Children: Mao Zedong; Mao Zemin; Mao Zetan; Mao Zejian (adopted)

Chinese name
- Traditional Chinese: 毛貽昌
- Simplified Chinese: 毛贻昌
Transcriptions
Standard Mandarin
- Hanyu Pinyin: Máo Yíchāng
- Wade–Giles: Mao2 I2-Ch'ang1

Mao Yichang (15 October 1870 – 23 January 1920), also known as Mao Rensheng, (Note: Different historians and biographers have used differing names for Mao Zedong's father; Philip Short, in Mao: A Life (1999), uses "Mao Rensheng" as does historian Rebecca Karl) was a Chinese peasant and grain merchant who achieved notability as the father of Mao Zedong. The nineteenth generation of the Mao clan, he was born and lived his life in the rural village of Shaoshanchong in Shaoshan, Hunan Province.

The son of Mao Enpu, he was raised in a poverty-stricken family of peasants. Marrying Wen Qimei when he was fifteen, he subsequently served for two years in the army. Returning to agriculture, he became a moneylender and grain merchant, buying up local grain and selling it in the city for a higher price, becoming one of the wealthiest farmers in Shaoshan, with 20 acres of land. He and Wen had four surviving children, Zedong, Zemin, Zetan, and Zejian, the latter of whom was adopted.

== Early life ==
According to family oral histories, the ancestor of the Mao clan in Shaoshanchong was Mao Taihua. Taihua left his native Jiangxi Province for Yunnan, where he joined Hongwu Emperor's rebellion against the Yuan regime; overthrew the Yuan and founded the Ming empire in 1368. Taihua married a local woman in Yunnan. In 1380, Taihua's family resettled in Hunan. Around ten years later, two sons moved to Shaoshanchong in Xiangtan County; Mao Yichang was their descendent.

Mao Yichang was born on 15 October 1870, the only child of Mao Enpu and his wife Liu. Enpu was a uneducated peasant who had lived in poverty throughout his life, leaving his son debt-ridden. He was betrothed to Wen when she was thirteen and he was ten; the wedding took place five years later when he was fifteen. Due to his father's debts, Yichang served for two years in the local army, during which time he saved enough money to purchase much of the land that his father had lost. Mao Yichang managed through hard work and frugality to become a significant village landowner. According to stories passed down from Mao Zedong to one of his daughters, Yichang often said:

Poverty is not the result of eating too much or spending too much. Poverty comes from an inability to do mathematics. Whoever can do sums will have enough to live by; whoever cannot will squander even mountains of gold!

Mao Yichang's mother, Liu, died aged 37 on 20 May 1884.

== Raising Mao Zedong ==
Prior to Mao Zedong's birth, Mao Yichang and his wife had had two sons, both of whom had died in infancy.

After the birth of Mao Zedong, his parents were presented with a rooster, as was the local custom.

Two years later, a second son was born, who was named Zemin, followed by a third son, Zetan, who was born in 1905. Two further daughters died in infancy, but the family began fostering another daughter.

Although a poorly educated peasant, Mao Yichang became one of the richest people in the village of Shaoshan. Mao Yichang grew rice, two-thirds of which fed his family with the remaining surplus sold at market. Mao Yichang hired two laborers and became a grain middleman for urban markets. Grain middlemen like Mao Yichang were a feature of rural markets, and as an adult, Mao Zedong would describe their economic role as "parasitic". Mao Yichang was also a usurious lender, obtaining mortgages on the other peasant's farms as a result.

Mao Yichang died in 1920 of typhoid.

Mao Zedong described his father as a strict disciplinarian who brutally beat him and his siblings. His father called him lazy because Mao preferred to read books over doing manual labor.

== Father (Mao Enpu) ==
Mao Enpu (April 27, 1846 – 1904), with his courtesy name Yinbin and nickname Yichen, was a Han Chinese farmer born in Xiangtan, Hunan, China. He married a woman the same age as him, named Liu (刘), with whom he had one son and two daughters. His only son was Mao Yichang, later father of his famous grandson Mao Zedong.
