= Isshu (disambiguation) =

Iki Province was a province of Japan.

Isshu may also refer to:

- Hyakunin Isshu, a traditional anthology style of compiling Japanese waka poetry
- Isshu Sugawara (born 1962), Japanese politician
- The Unova region, a region in the fictional Pokémon franchise known as the Isshu region in Japanese
