= Mao Yuanxin =

Chinese politician and nephew of Mao Zedong

- 毛远新
- Born: 14 February 1941 (age 85); Dihua, Xinjiang, Republic of China
- Other name: Li Shi (李实)
- Education: Tsinghua University; PLA Institute of Military Engineering
- Occupations: Politician, soldier, engineer
- Spouse: Quan Xiufeng (m. 1972)
- Children: 1 (daughter)
- Relatives: Mao family

Mao Yuanxin

Military service
- Allegiance: People's Republic of China
- Branch/service: People's Liberation Army Ground Force
- Years of service: 1960-1976

Mao Yuanxin
- Traditional Chinese: 毛遠新
- Simplified Chinese: 毛远新
Transcriptions
Standard Mandarin
- Hanyu Pinyin: Máo Yuǎnxīn
Yue: Cantonese
- Jyutping: Mou4 jyun5 san1

Mao Yuanxin (born 14 February 1941), also known as Li Shi (Chinese: 李实), is a former Chinese politician, military officer and engineer. As the nephew of Chairman Mao Zedong, he acted as the liaison between Mao and the Communist Party's Central Committee in Mao's ailing years, when he was no longer able to regularly attend political functions. He was considered an ally to the radical political faction known as the Gang of Four. He was arrested soon after Mao's death after a political struggle ensued, and was sentenced to prison.

== Biography ==
Born on 14 February 1941 in Dihua (now Urumqi), Mao Yuanxin is the son of Mao Zemin, a younger brother of Mao Zedong, who joined the Communist Party in 1922 and was executed by warlord Sheng Shicai in 1943. Sheng, governor of Xinjiang, had been aligned to the Chinese Communist Party and had at first welcomed Mao Zemin, but switched allegiance after Germany invaded the Soviet Union. Mao Yuanxin's mother was also arrested. After she remarried, Mao Yuanxin was brought up as part of his uncle's family.

In 1960, Mao Yuanxin was admitted to Tsinghua University, then transferred to the PLA Institute of Military Engineering and became politically important during the Cultural Revolution. In 1973 he became party secretary of Liaoning province and political commissar of Shenyang Military Region in 1974. By that time he had allied himself with Jiang Qing. In Shenyang he participated in the Cultural Revolution, including leading a march of Red Guards to a military installation in the Northeast. By 1975, when Mao was no longer able to attend Central Committee meetings on a regular basis, Mao Yuanxin became the chairman's liaison with the Politburo, and he contributed to the temporary fall of Deng Xiaoping in 1976, as well as a series of other political manuoevers of the Gang of Four.

During Mao Zedong's final years, Mao Yuanxin had a close relationship with the Gang of Four. Some historians believe that Mao Yuanxin relayed news to Mao that the April 1976 "Tiananmen Incident" was planned by Deng Xiaoping, which resulted in Mao's final break with Deng before the latter's purge. Mao Yuanxin was arrested along with the Gang of Four following Mao's death in October 1976, and was sentenced to seventeen years in prison by court martial.

Mao Yuanxin faded from public view after the end of the Cultural Revolution. He was released from prison in October 1993 after having served his 17-year sentence. He changed his name to Li Shi and worked in the Shanghai Automobile Industry Quality Testing Institute as an engineer. He retired in 2001, and receives a pension in accordance with his "senior engineer" qualification. He also receives treatment as a "martyr's family member" because of his father's manner of death.

In October 2012, Mao Yuanxin visited Xichuan County in Henan to tour the progress of the South–North Water Transfer Project. He also attended the 120 year commemoration of his uncle's birth in 2013, held in Hunan Province.

== Personal life ==
Mao Yuanxin is married to Quan Xiufeng (全秀凤), a former factory worker. They live in Shanghai and have one daughter, Li Li (李莉), born in January 1977.
