= Mao Zemin =

Chinese communist revolutionary

- 毛泽民
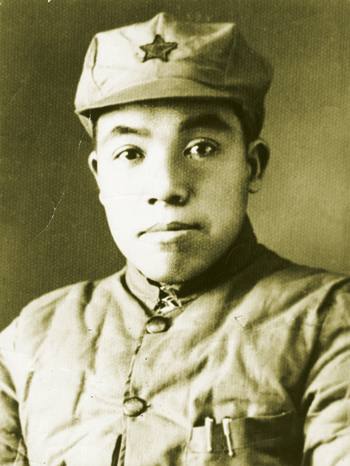
- Born: 3 April 1896; Shaoshan, Hunan, Qing China
- Died: 27 September 1943 (aged 47); Dihua (now Ürümqi), Xinjiang, Republic of China
- Cause of death: Execution
- Other name: Zhou Bin (alias)
- Occupations: Revolutionary, banker
- Political party: Chinese Communist Party
- Spouse(s): Wang Shulan (m. 1913) Qian Xijun Zhu Danhua (m. 1940)
- Children: Mao Yuanxin
- Relatives: Mao Zedong (brother); Mao Zetan (brother); Mao family

Mao Zemin (simplified Chinese: 毛泽民; traditional Chinese: 毛澤民; pinyin: Máo Zémín, 3 April 1896 – 27 September 1943), also known by the alias Zhou Bin (Chinese: 周彬; pinyin: Zhōu Bīn), was a Chinese communist revolutionary and a younger brother of Mao Zedong. He was the first president of the state bank of the Chinese Soviet Republic and later minister of national economy of the communist government. In 1938, the Chinese Communist Party (CCP) sent him to Xinjiang, where he served in the provincial government of the warlord Sheng Shicai. After Sheng turned against the communists, he had Mao arrested in 1942 and executed in 1943.

== Early life ==
Mao Zemin was born on 3 April 1896 in Shaoshan, Hunan, the second son of Mao Yichang and Wen Qimei. His younger brother was Mao Zetan. After he had learned some characters, his father had him keep the household accounts and learn to use the abacus, and when Mao Zedong left home to study in 1910, Mao Zemin, then about 14, took on the farm work and household duties. In 1913, he married Wang Shulan, and he managed the family farm while his father traded goods. These details come from his personnel records held in the Russian State Archive of Socio-Political History.

In autumn 1921, Mao studied at the Hunan Self-Study University, which Mao Zedong had founded. He joined the revolutionary movement in 1921 and joined the CCP soon afterwards.

== Revolutionary career ==
In July 1923, Mao became the third general manager of the Anyuan Railway and Mining Workers' Consumer Cooperative in Anyuan, Jiangxi. He reorganized the cooperative's loosely run management by centralizing the review of accounts and funds under the general manager and unifying its business planning, and in August 1923 he oversaw the drafting of a 17-article code of conduct for its staff.

In February 1925, he followed Mao Zedong to Xiangtan and Xiangxiang to organize the peasant movement, and in September he entered the Peasant Movement Training Institute in Guangzhou. He later did underground party work in Shanghai, Wuhan and Tianjin.

=== Central Soviet and the National Bank ===
In January 1931, Mao entered the Central Soviet Area and became head of the economic department of the Fujian–Guangdong–Jiangxi Military Region. Later that year, he became president of the bank of the provisional central government of the Chinese Soviet Republic. The National Bank was formally established in Ruijin on 1 February 1932 as the first state bank under CCP leadership, with Mao as its president. He also served as general manager of the China Tungsten Sand General Company, whose tungsten exports helped fund the bank.

The bank began issuing soviet banknotes in July 1932, redeemable one for one with silver dollars and bearing the signatures of Mao and the finance minister Deng Zihui. In May 1933, Mao also became finance minister of the Fujian–Jiangxi provincial soviet government, and in September 1933 the soviet's Central Mint was placed under the bank's management. In September 1934, he was made head of the State Foreign Trade Bureau.

=== Long March and Shaanbei ===
When the Long March began in October 1934, Mao led the 15th Detachment, formed from the finance ministry and the National Bank, which became known as "the national bank on a carrying pole". Its staff and more than 200 porters carried banknotes, gold bars and printing materials. He also served as deputy head of the confiscation committee, deputy commander of the vanguard regiment and deputy head of the general supply department.

In February 1936, after the Red Army reached northern Shaanxi, Mao became minister of national economy of the Chinese Soviet Workers' and Peasants' Democratic Government. In spring 1937, he and his wife Qian Xijun went to Shanghai to collect funds raised for the CCP by the Comintern.

== Xinjiang ==
In late 1937, Mao and Qian set out through Xinjiang under the alias Zhou Bin to seek medical treatment in the Soviet Union, but an outbreak of plague closed the border, and with the approval of the party leadership he remained in Xinjiang. In February 1938, the party sent him to work in Xinjiang with Chen Tanqiu on united front work. Sheng Shicai, then allied with the Soviet Union, employed several hundred CCP cadres from Yan'an in his administration.

Ten days after first meeting Sheng, Mao was named deputy director of the provincial finance department. He later became acting director of finance and then head of the civil affairs department. The historian Justin M. Jacobs wrote that Sheng also placed Mao in charge of the Rebel Assets Committee, one of Sheng's least reputable organizations, and that Mao spared no effort in trying to relieve Sheng of his Soviet creditors but could not raise enough capital to satisfy them.

== Arrest and death ==
After Sheng broke with the Soviet Union and aligned with the Nationalists in 1942, he moved against the CCP cadres in his administration. On 17 September 1942, Mao was arrested together with Chen Tanqiu and other communists. In prison, he was tortured to make him confess to a communist plot in Xinjiang and renounce the party, but he refused, and he went on hunger strike seven times. Sheng's own account of the period, published by the American scholar Allen S. Whiting in 1958, included a "confession" attributed to Mao.

On the night of 27 September 1943, Mao was secretly killed by Sheng's regime, at the age of 47. According to an account first published in the history journal Bainianchao, he was knocked unconscious, strangled and buried in a remote spot. Jacobs wrote that Sheng executed a considerable number of the Yan'an cadres, including Mao. The party found his remains in 1950. In 1956, a committee was set up to rebury him together with Chen Tanqiu, Lin Jilu, Qiao Guozhen and Wu Maolin, and his remains were moved to the newly built Ürümqi Revolutionary Martyrs Cemetery. His tombstone stands beside those of the other four on the altar of the cemetery's memorial square.

== Personal life ==
Mao married Wang Shulan in 1913. He later married Qian Xijun, from whom he had separated by 1939. In May 1940, he married Zhu Danhua at the Xinjiang provincial government auditorium in Dihua, and their son, Mao Yuanxin, was born the following year. Zhu did not learn of his death until February 1945, and she and her son were held in prison until 1946, when they were released and returned to Yan'an. On 1 June 1949, Zhu married the communist official Fang Zhichun, and the family soon moved south to Jiangxi, where she raised Mao Yuanxin with Fang's children. She became a vice chairperson of the Jiangxi provincial committee of the Chinese People's Political Consultative Conference in 1983 and retired in 1997.
