= Mao Anqing =

Second son of Mao Zedong (1923–2007)

- 毛岸青
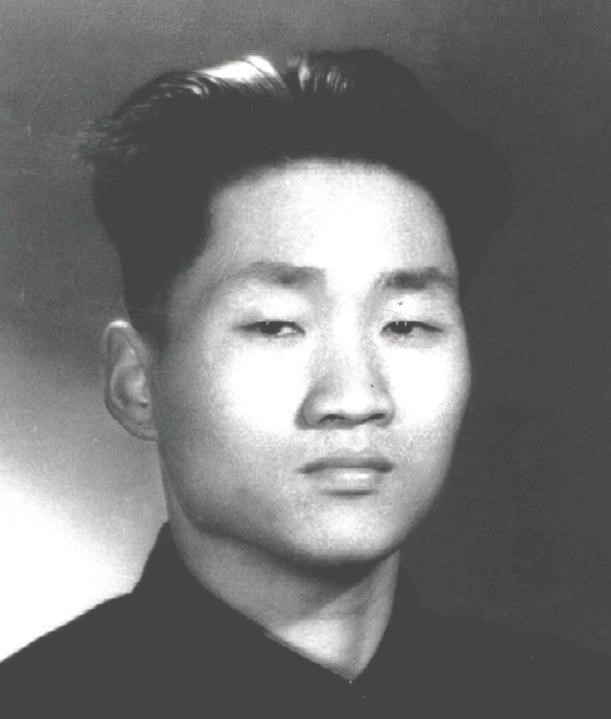
- Born: 23 November 1923; Changsha, Hunan, Republic of China
- Died: 23 March 2007 (aged 83); Beijing, China
- Occupation: Translator
- Spouse: Shao Hua (m. 1960; died 2007)
- Children: Mao Xinyu
- Parent(s): Mao Zedong; Yang Kaihui
- Relatives: Mao Anying (brother); Mao Anlong (brother)

Mao Anqing (Chinese: 毛岸青; pinyin: Máo Ànqīng; 23 November 1923 – 23 March 2007) was the second son of Mao Zedong and his wife Yang Kaihui. After his mother's execution in 1930, he lived for several years on the streets of Shanghai before being sent with his elder brother Mao Anying to the Soviet Union, where he stayed until 1947. On his return to China, he worked as a translator of Russian, mainly rendering works of Marxism–Leninism into Chinese.

Mao suffered from mental illness for much of his adult life and spent long periods in hospitals, and he held no political or government post. When he died in 2007, he was the last known surviving son of Mao Zedong.

== Early life ==
Mao Anqing was born on 23 November 1923 in Changsha, Hunan, according to the Xinhua News Agency. Some Western and Hong Kong reports instead gave his birth date as 2 November 1923. He was the second of the three sons of Mao Zedong and Yang Kaihui.

On 14 November 1930, Yang Kaihui was executed on the orders of the Hunan warlord He Jian. With the help of the underground Chinese Communist Party, Mao Anqing and his brothers Mao Anying and Mao Anlong were taken secretly to Shanghai, where they were placed in a kindergarten run by the party's underground organization. After the Shanghai underground network was badly damaged in the spring of 1931, the boys were left to fend for themselves. Mao Anlong was later lost, and official accounts differ on his fate, with Xinhua stating that he died young of illness and a 2010 report saying that he disappeared on the streets of Shanghai in 1931.

The two older brothers sold newspapers and scavenged in rubbish bins to survive, according to Chinese state media. During this period, Mao Anqing was beaten by a policeman and suffered a head injury, which was often blamed for the mental illness that affected him for the rest of his life.

In 1936, the party's underground organization in Shanghai located Mao Anying, then 14, and Mao Anqing, then 13, and arranged for them to study in the Soviet Union. According to Western accounts, the brothers travelled to the Soviet Union by way of Paris. They entered the Second International Children's Home on the outskirts of Moscow early in 1937. In January 1941, Mao Zedong wrote to his sons advising them to concentrate on the natural sciences and to talk less about politics, and he sent them a collection of books.

During the German–Soviet war, Mao Anying volunteered for the front, while Mao Anqing helped the war effort by digging trenches and carrying wounded soldiers. He later studied at the Moscow Institute of Oriental Languages. The biographers Jung Chang and Jon Halliday have argued that Joseph Stalin also treated the brothers as hostages to keep Mao Zedong in check.

== Return to China ==
Mao Anqing returned to China in 1947, and he joined the Chinese Communist Party with Li Fuchun and Cai Chang as his sponsors. At his father's wish, he spent eight months taking part in a pilot land reform programme in Keshan County, Heilongjiang. In July 1949, he moved to Beijing and became a Russian translator in the office of the Central Propaganda Department that translated the works of Marx, Engels, Lenin and Stalin.

In the early years of the People's Republic of China, Mao took part in translating works by Lenin and Stalin, including Stalin's writings on linguistics. Xinhua credited him with translating and publishing more than ten classic Marxist works and books on political theory, and the Central Compilation and Translation Bureau said that he had also published more than 20 articles on Soviet political theory and literature. The Irish Times reported that he was more at ease reading Russian than Chinese, and that he later worked as a researcher at the Academy of Military Sciences, a post that carried military rank.

Mao Anying was killed in an American air raid on the headquarters of the Chinese People's Volunteers in Korea on 25 November 1950. His death worsened Mao Anqing's mental condition, and Western reports said that he was believed to have schizophrenia and spent much of his adult life in psychiatric hospitals. According to a 2010 Chinese report, the combination of his childhood head injury and grief over his brother's death led him to spend a period recuperating in Dalian in the late 1950s and early 1960s. The Observer wrote that his father paid him little attention after his return to China.

== Marriage and later life ==
In 1960, Mao Anqing married Shao Hua, a match in which Mao Zedong personally intervened, according to the South China Morning Post. Shao Hua, originally named Zhang Shaohua, was born in Yan'an in October 1938 to the Red Army official Chen Zhenya and the revolutionary Zhang Wenqiu. Zhang Wenqiu was also the mother of Liu Siqi, the widow of Mao Anying. Shao Hua later became a major general in the People's Liberation Army and worked at the Academy of Military Sciences. The couple's only son Mao Xinyu was born in 1970.

In later life, Mao Anqing and Shao Hua co-edited a commemorative collection about Mao Zedong and the documentary series China Produced a Mao Zedong, and they helped to plan film and television works including one about Yang Kaihui. With Shao Hua and their son, he retraced the route of the Long March several times and visited former revolutionary base areas, factories and villages. Xinhua described him as an avid reader who wrote song lyrics and composed music. People's Daily noted that he never wrote a memoir and avoided publicity as the son of a national leader, and Shao Hua described their life together over more than 40 years as both great and ordinary.

== Death ==
Mao Anqing died in Beijing at 4:20 am on 23 March 2007, at the age of 84. No cause of death was announced, but The Irish Times reported that he had been treated for kidney problems in a military hospital. His death was first reported by the China News Service.

His funeral was held at the Babaoshan Revolutionary Cemetery in western Beijing on 2 April 2007.A memorial document distributed at the service called him an outstanding member of the Communist Party, a translator of Marxist–Leninist works and a researcher on Mao Zedong Thought. In line with the couple's wishes and with the approval of the central authorities, their ashes were taken from Beijing to Hunan. They were buried together on the afternoon of 21 December 2008 at the Yang Kaihui Martyrs' Cemetery in Changsha County, on the west side of the cemetery beside the grave of his mother.
