= Kaihui =

Kaihui Town 开慧镇
- town
- Location in Hunan
- Coordinates: 28°35′N 113°13′E
- Country: China
- Province: Hunan
- Prefecture-level city: Changsha
- County: Changsha County

Area
  - Total: 54 km^{2} (21 sq mi)

Population (2000)
  - Total: 19,553
  - Density: 360/km^{2} (940/sq mi)
- Time zone: UTC+8 (China Standard)

Kaihui (Chinese: 开慧镇) is a town in Changsha County, Hunan Province, China. It administers six villages and one community. Baisha town merged to Kaihui on November 19, 2015.
