= Wen Qimei =

Mother of Mao Zedong (1867–1919)

Wen Qimei 文素勤
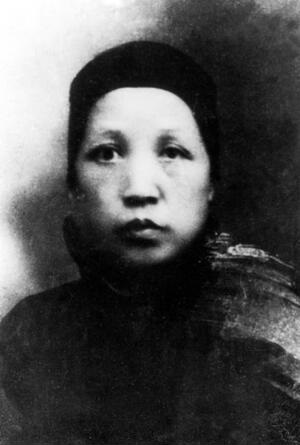
- Born: Wen Suqin; 12 February 1867; Xiangxiang, Hunan, China
- Died: 5 October 1919 (aged 52); Shaoshan, Hunan, Republic of China
- Occupation: Farm labourer
- Spouse: Mao Yichang
- Children: Mao Zedong; Mao Zemin; Mao Zetan; Mao Zejian (adopted)

Wen Suqin

Wen Suqin
- Chinese: 文素勤
- Literal meaning: 文 (Wén, surname)
Transcriptions
Standard Mandarin
- Hanyu Pinyin: Wén Sùqín

Wen Qimei
- Chinese: 文七妹
Transcriptions
Standard Mandarin
- Hanyu Pinyin: Wén Qīmèi

Wen Qimei
- Chinese: 文其美
Transcriptions
Standard Mandarin
- Hanyu Pinyin: Wén Qíměi

Wen Qimei (born Wen Suqin; 12 February 1867 – 5 October 1919) was a Chinese peasant and the mother of Mao Zedong.

== Life ==
Wen was born in 1867 in the valley of Sidutaiping, in Xiangxiang county of Hunan. Her father, Wen Qifu, was a poor shoemaker who was a heavy drinker. Her mother was a 14-year-old concubine of Qifu's when she was born. She had two brothers and two sisters and attended the local Buddhist nunnery for education until she was 10. Her father would beat her mother, so they fled to Shaoshan, Hunan. There, Suqin's mother remarried a 60-year-old landowner, which was quite unusual in mainland China at that time. At the age of 13, her stepfather arranged her marriage to 10-year-old Mao Yichang, who came from a long line of peasants. At the age of 26, Suqin gave birth to Mao Zedong.

After the birth of Mao Zedong, his parents were presented with a rooster, as was the local custom. Wen was concerned for her baby's health, having had two sons who had perished in their infancy. She took the baby to see a Buddhist monk who was living in the mountains, and asked the monk to take care of him. The monk refused, believing that baby Zedong appeared healthy. From there, she traveled to her father's house in a neighboring district, along the way stopping at a temple devoted to the bodhisattva Guan Yin, where she prayed that the deity would become Zedong's foster mother.

She died of lymphatic cancer on October 5, 1919.
