= Li Na (daughter of Mao Zedong) =

Daughter of Mao Zedong (born 1940)

- Born: 3 August 1940 (age 86); Yan'an, Shaanxi, Republic of China
- Education: Peking University
- Spouses: Xiao Xu (divorced); Wang Jingqing (m. 1984; died 2021)
- Children: 1
- Parents: Mao Zedong; Jiang Qing
- Relatives: Mao family

Li Na (simplified Chinese: 李讷; traditional Chinese: 李訥; pinyin: Lǐ Nà, also pronounced Li Ne, (Note: Li Na pronounced her own name as "Li Na" (see, e.g., a television interview by Yangguang Weishi (阳光卫视)). The traditional pronunciation of the character "讷" was "Nà"; however, in Modern Standard Chinese it has shifted to "Nè": see "讷" in 辞海 [Cihai]. Shanghai Literary Press. 1999. ISBN 7-5326-0702-X.. See also contemporary dictionaries which only list the "Nè" pronunciation, e.g.: Xinhua Zidian p.357, Commercial Press 1998, ISBN 7-100-02601-6; the 现代汉语词典 [Modern Chinese Dictionary] (5th ed.). The Commercial Press. 2005. p. 986. ISBN 7-100-04385-9.; or the 古今汉语词典 [Ancient and Modern Chinese Dictionary]. The Commercial Press. 2000. p. 1024. ISBN 7-100-02822-1.; or the 新华汉语词典 [Xinhua Chinese Dictionary]. The Commercial Press. 2004. p. 887. ISBN 7-80103-362-0.. Some reliable sources also call her Li Ne (see, e.g., New mood of open-minded politics gaining ground in China Archived 19 July 2011 at the Wayback Machine, Xinhua News Agency, 4 March 2003). However, some other reliable sources call her Li Na.) born 3 August 1940) is the daughter of Mao Zedong and his fourth wife Jiang Qing, and their only child together. Her surname is Li rather than Mao, because her father used the pseudonym "Li Desheng" (李德胜; 李德勝) for a period of time during the Chinese Civil War.

The names of Li Na and her sister Li Min come from Book 4 of the Analects of Confucius: "ne yu yan er min yu xing" (讷于言而敏于行, meaning slow in speech and earnest in conduct).

== Early life ==
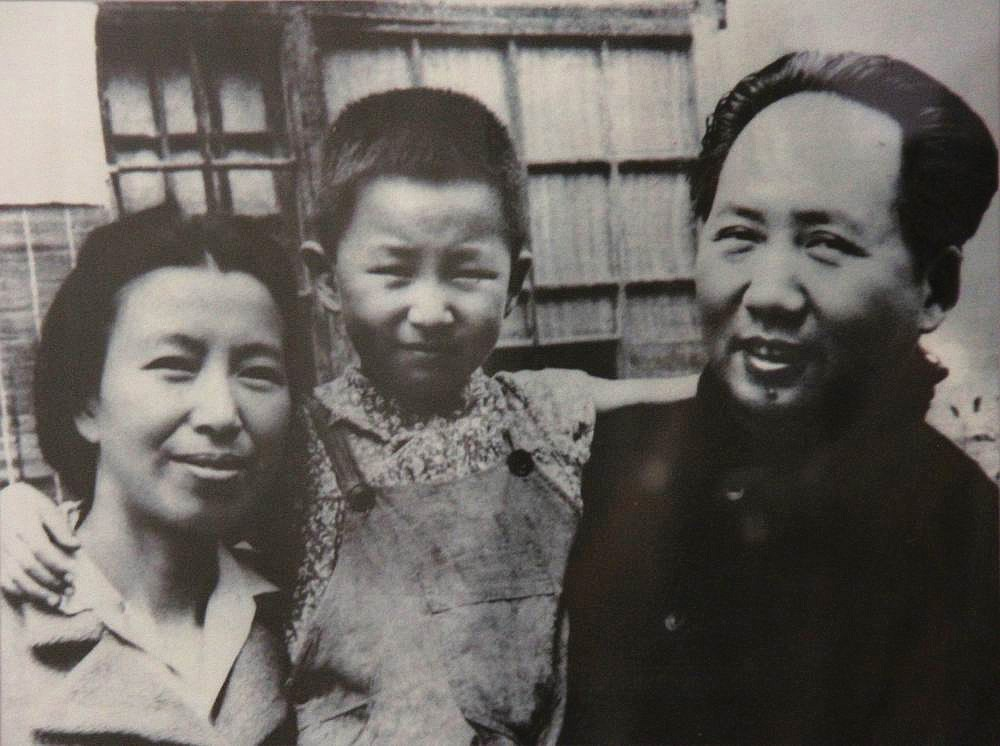
Li Na as a young girl, with her parents Jiang Qing and Mao Zedong

Li Na was born at Central Hospital in Yan'an on 3 August 1940. In her childhood, she was fascinated by Russian as well as Classical Chinese literature. In 1949, Li moved to Beijing with her parents, and started third grade at Yuying Primary School. Four years later, in 1953, she was admitted to the Beijing Normal University Girls' High School (北京师范大学附属女子中学, now known as Experimental High School Attached to Beijing Normal University).

== Cultural Revolution ==
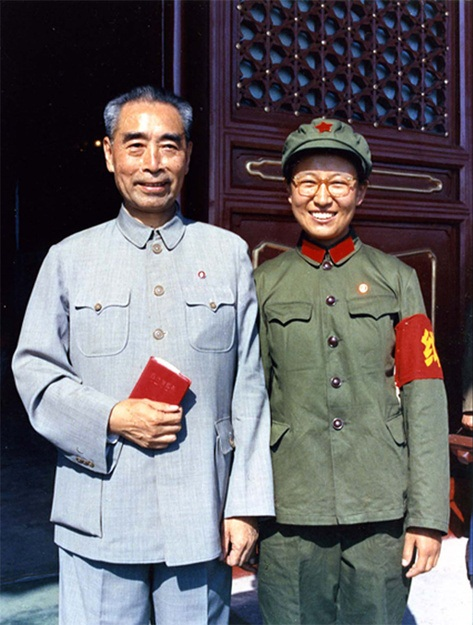
Zhou Enlai and Li Na

Excelling in her studies, she majored in history at Peking University, graduating in 1966. Following her graduation she was assigned to People's Liberation Army Daily as a writer, under the pen name Xiao Li, during the Cultural Revolution.

Subsequently, at the age of 27, she became its chief editor. On 13 January 1967, Li Na organized the "Revolutionary Rebel Commando " and posted a large-character poster of "Where is the People's Liberation Army News Going" to expose Hu Chi (the acting president of Xinhua News Agency and a member of the Cultural Revolution Group within the PLA), Song Qiong, Yang Zicai and the other leaders about the direction of motion of the newspaper.

On 17 January, Marshal Lin Biao signed the "Letter to Revolutionary Comrades of the People's Liberation Army Newspaper", affirming that this action ignited a revolutionary flame within the newspaper. She successively served as the head of the military newspaper page groups ('Central Cultural Revolution Reporters' and 'Express'), and the leader of the editor-in-chief leading group of Liberation Army Daily (equivalent to editor-in-chief).

In January of the same year, due to her being the daughter of Mao Zedong and Jiang Qing, she took up the post of head of the Central Cultural Revolution Team. On 23 August 1967, Li Xiao's third big-character poster was published: "Repeatedly, anti-conservative, and vowed to carry the revolution to the end!" She was a member of the 10th National Congress of the Chinese Communist Party in 1973, and the Party Chief of CCP Pinggu County Committee and Deputy Secretary of CCP Beijing Committee from 1975 to 1994.

== Later life ==
On 9 September 1976, after years of ill health, Mao Zedong suffered a series of heart attacks and died at the age of 82. After his death, Jiang Qing was arrested and sent to the Qincheng Prison, where she was detained for five years. In the same year, after the end of Cultural Revolution, Li Na's political position was abolished. She was once laid off and was assigned to the Security Bureau dormitory by the Central Office.

During the 1980s, the trial of Jiang Qing and other members of Gang of Four began and the trials were televised nationwide. During this time, Li Na visited her mother once every two weeks. By 1983, Jiang Qing's death sentence was commuted to life imprisonment. In 1986, Li Na was assigned to work in the Secretariat of the General Office of the CCP Central Committee, and retired after the 1990s. On 14 May 1991, Jiang Qing committed suicide at the age of 77, by hanging herself in a bathroom of her hospital in Beijing, while on a medical parole.

Since 2003, she has been a member of the Chinese People's Political Consultative Conference.

On 9 September 2006, on the 30th anniversary of Mao Zedong's death, she visited the Mausoleum of Mao Zedong along with many of Mao Zedong's staff and descendants to participate in the commemoration. When Li Na finally left the memorial hall, she held the staff tightly and said with tears in her eyes, "Thank you for taking care of my dad for 30 years".

On 21 May 2013, Li Na participated in the opening ceremony of the large-scale theme exhibition "Mao Zedong and China's Two Bombs, One Satellite", to commemorate the 120th anniversary of Mao Zedong's birth and the opening ceremony of the Hainan First Exhibition of "Hundred Generals and Famous Letters Praising Mao Zedong", which was held at the Hainan Provincial Museum.

On 31 October 2013, to commemorate the 120th anniversary of Mao Zedong's birth, a bronze tripod "Mao Gong Bao Ding" was unveiled in Beijing, along with a donation ceremony and symposium which was held. It was attended by Li Na and her husband.

On 20 May 2015, Li Na visited Northern Shaanxi, the birthplace of the Chinese Communist Revolution, to attend the ceremony honoring her father. The ceremony was also attended by many of those who fought and worked alongside Mao Zedong during the revolution.

In 2023, following the 2023 China floods, she donated ¥10000 to the people affected by the floods in Hebei Province.

== Personal life ==
In 1970, she was sent to work at the May 7th School in Jinxian County, Jiangxi, and during her time there, fell in love with Xiao Xu. Xiao was the waiter at the Beidaihe Guesthouse. To the consternation to her mother, but the approval of Mao, Li married Xiao and gave birth to a son, Xu Xiaoning. Mao even gave them a set of Selected Works of Marxism. However, a rift subsequently developed in their marriage, and it ended in divorce.

In 1984, she was remarried to Wang Jingqing, a bodyguard to Mao Zedong and Chief of Staff of the Nujiang Army Division of Kunming Military Region. As a result of her marriage to Wang, Xu Xiaoning changed his name to Wang Xiaozhi. Xu himself is married and has two children. Wang Jingqing died on 1 March 2021, at the age of 94, from an illness.
