= Philip Short =

British journalist and author (born 1945)

- Born: 17 April 1945 (age 81); Bristol, England
- Education: Sherborne School, Dorset
- Alma mater: Queens' College, Cambridge
- Occupations: Journalist and author
- Years active: 1967—present
- Employer: BBC
- Known for: BBC overseas correspondent (for 30 years)

Philip Short (born 17 April 1945) is a British journalist and author.

== Early life and education ==
Short was born in Bristol. He was educated at Sherborne School, a boarding public school for boys, in the market town of Sherborne in Dorset, followed by Queens' College, Cambridge.

== Life and career ==
After graduation, Short spent the years from 1967 to 1973 as a freelance journalist, first in Malawi, then in Uganda. He then joined the BBC as a foreign correspondent. He worked there for 30 years. He is the author of several books, among them the biographies of Hastings Banda, Mao Zedong, Pol Pot, François Mitterrand, and Vladimir Putin.

Short presented a TV documentary on Mao Zedong entitled Mao's Bloody Revolution Revealed on the UK terrestrial station Five in May 2007.

== Bibliography ==
- Banda (1974).
- The Dragon and the Bear: Inside China and Russia Today (1982).
- Mao: A Life (1999). Published as Mao: The Man Who Made China in New Edition (2017).
- Pol Pot: History of a Nightmare (2005). Published in the U.S. as Pol Pot: Anatomy of a Nightmare (2006).
- Mitterrand: A Study in Ambiguity (2013). Published in the U.S. as A Taste for Intrigue: The Multiple Lives of François Mitterrand (2014).
- Putin: His Life and Times Published in the U.S. as Putin (2022).
