= Yang Kaihui =

Second wife of Mao Zedong (1901–1930)

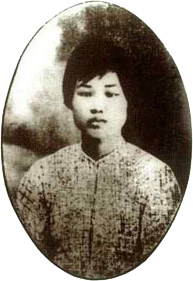
- Born: 6 November 1901; Banchang, Changsha County, Hunan, Qing Empire
- Died: 14 November 1930 (aged 29); Changsha, Hunan, Republic of China
- Cause of death: Execution by firing squad
- Era: White Terror (China) (executed)
- Political party: Chinese Communist Party
- Spouse: Mao Zedong (m. 1920)
- Children: Mao Anying (1922–1950); Mao Anqing (1924–2007); Mao Anlong (1927–1931)
- Relatives: Yang Youlin

Yang Kaihui
- Traditional Chinese: 楊開慧
- Simplified Chinese: 杨开慧
Transcriptions
Standard Mandarin
- Hanyu Pinyin: Yáng Kāihuì
- Wade–Giles: Yang2 K'ai1-hui4

Yunjin
- Traditional Chinese: 雲錦
- Simplified Chinese: 云锦
Transcriptions
Standard Mandarin
- Hanyu Pinyin: Yúnjǐn
- Wade–Giles: Yün2-chin3

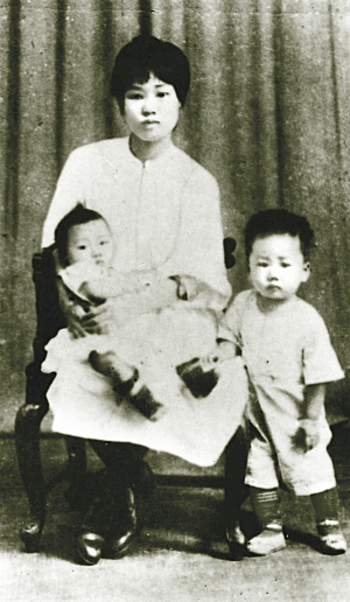
Yang Kaihui with her children.

Yang Kaihui (Chinese: 楊開慧; pinyin: Yáng Kāihuì, courtesy name Yunjin 雲錦, 6 November 1901 – 14 November 1930) was a Chinese communist and the second wife of Mao Zedong, whom she married in 1920. She had three sons with him, Mao Anying, Mao Anqing and Mao Anlong. Her father, Yang Changji, taught ethics at the First Normal School in Changsha and was one of Mao's favorite teachers. Yang was arrested by the Nationalist authorities in October 1930 and executed in Changsha the following month. Her letters and essays, hidden in the walls of her home and found in 1982 and 1990, have shaped later accounts of her marriage to Mao.

== Early life ==
Yang Kaihui was born in the small village of Bancang near Changsha, Hunan Province, on 6 November 1901. Her name meant "Opening Wisdom", although she came to be nicknamed Xia, meaning "Little Dawn". Her father was Yang Changji, a teacher and leftist intellectual, her mother was Xiang Zhenxi, and she had a brother three years older than her, Yang Kaizhi. Through his teaching of ethics at the First Normal School, Yang Changji became a father figure to his pupil Mao Zedong. He later wrote in his journal that "it is truly difficult to imagine someone so intelligent and handsome" as Mao. In the summer of 1916, Mao was invited to spend several days at the Yangs' home in Bancang, and he walked twenty miles in straw sandals to get there. On this occasion, he did not talk to either Xiang Zhenxi or Yang Kaizhi, instead bowing his head to them as a mark of respect.

Yang Changji gained a professorship at Peking University and moved his family to the city. Mao came to Peking in September 1918 with several like-minded friends from Hunan. Upon arrival, they stayed in the Yangs' small house in the north of the city. Here, Mao met Kaihui again, and the two discovered a mutual attraction. A friend who knew Kaihui at the time described her as "small in stature and round-faced, with deep-set eyes and pale white skin", and her appearance impressed both Mao and his friends. Kaihui later related that she had "fallen madly in love with him already when I heard about his numerous accomplishments" but did not make her feelings immediately known. She kept "hoping and dreaming" that he shared her feelings and decided that she would never marry anyone but him.

Their relationship did not develop swiftly, as Mao was shy and lacked the money to court her, and he lived in cramped rented rooms with other Hunanese students in Peking's Three-Eyed Well district. Yang Changji secured Mao a job at the university library as assistant to the librarian Li Dazhao, an early Chinese communist.

In January 1920, Yang Changji died. Mao was in Peking, ostensibly on business, though the biographer Stuart Schram suspected that his presence was partly due to his desire to comfort Kaihui. Yang Kaihui and her mother returned to Changsha with her father's remains, and she soon entered the Fusiang Girls' School. At the missionary school, her exposure to revolutionary ideas got her labeled a "rebel", and she refused to pray and cut her hair short in defiance of convention.

Mao had gone from Peking to Shanghai, where he worked in a laundry and joined a communist group for the first time. After the Hunanese warlord Zhang Jingyao was overthrown by generals favorable to Mao, he returned to Changsha in July 1920 and opened a bookstore and publishing house. Now possessing social status and financial security, Mao was able to marry Kaihui.

== Revolutionary activity ==
In 1920, Yang joined the Socialist Youth League as one of its first members in Hunan. She and Mao married by the end of 1920. Chinese official accounts describe a simple wedding in Changsha. She became one of the early members of the Chinese Communist Party (CCP). A 1978 commemorative stamp issue dated her membership to 1921, while a 2021 CCTV profile gives 1922. She handled confidential and liaison work for the party's Xiang District Committee.

By the 1920s, the communist movement in China used an organizing strategy that combined advocacy in the workplace with advocacy of women's rights. The communists led union organizing among male workers while also working in nearby peasant communities on women's issues, including literacy for women. Yang and Mao were among the most effective communist organizers using this method, which they applied at the Anyuan mines and in nearby peasant communities. From 1923 to 1927, she worked with Mao in Shanghai, Shaoshan and Wuhan in the labor, peasant and women's movements.

After the collapse of the alliance between the CCP and the Kuomintang (KMT) in 1927, the party sent Yang to do underground work around Bancang. She returned there with her three young sons, and according to the CCTV profile, she helped to rebuild the Yangliupo party branch, one of the earliest rural branches. She and Mao had separated by 1927 as his role grew, and the White Terror made it impossible for them to reunite.

Yuan Wencai's wife, Xie Meixiang, recalled that in late 1927, Mao, who was organizing the revolutionary base area at Jinggangshan in Jiangxi, asked a trader named Wu Fushou to look for Yang in Changsha. The first time, Wu returned with no news, but on his second visit to Changsha he heard a false report that Yang had been killed in the White Terror. Wu returned to Jinggangshan and told Mao that Yang had died, and with the party's contact network between Hunan and Jiangxi severed, there was no other news. Some time later, Mao fell ill, and Yuan Wencai arranged for He Zizhen to care for him and encouraged the two to begin a relationship. By 1928, Mao had married He Zizhen.

== Writings ==
In 1982, a cache of Yang's writings was found during repairs to her former residence in Bancang. According to the Hunan Daily, the letters had been hidden in a crack in the inner wall of her bedroom about two meters above the floor, and they were addressed to relatives including Mao and her younger brother, all of whom had died by the time they were found. The newspaper describes her letters to Mao as expressing longing, hope, struggle, unease and helplessness. One manuscript of about 4,200 characters is kept at the Yang Kaihui Memorial in Bancang.

According to Jung Chang and Jon Halliday, seven fragments were found in the walls in 1982 and an eighth under a beam in 1990, and most were written in 1929 and early 1930, after Mao had left her. They include a memoir titled "From aged 6 to 28", dated 20 June 1929, and a last piece dated 28 January 1930, in which she wrote, "No matter how hard I try, I just can't stop loving him." Chang and Halliday argue that the writings also show her losing faith in communism and its violence. The writer Sheila Melvin notes that the writings express Yang's love for Mao, her support for feminism and her distress over his alleged affairs, and that the Hunan Museum's magazine published them in 2006 with an introduction by Ou Jinlin.

== Arrest and death ==
After a failed communist attack on Changsha in 1930, in which Mao reluctantly took part, Yang was arrested on 24 October 1930 on the orders of He Jian, the KMT warlord in control of Hunan, because she was Mao's wife. She was jailed with her son Mao Anying and a nanny. Most accounts, including one published by her brother Yang Kaizhi in the Liberation Army Daily in 1977, say that she was offered her release if she renounced Mao, but that she refused. Chang and Halliday write that Mao made no effort to save or warn her, although her house lay on his route and he was in the area for three weeks.

Yang was executed on 14 November 1930 at Shiziling, outside the Liuyang Gate of Changsha, at the age of 29. Accounts of her death vary. She reportedly shouted slogans in support of the revolution and the party, and some accounts say that she did not die at once and needed a second round of shots. Her youngest son died soon after her execution, and the two older sons were left on the streets of Shanghai until the party rescued them and sent them to Moscow. Mao Anying was later killed early in the Korean War, and Mao Anqing became a translator for the CCP Central Committee.

On the 100th anniversary of her birth, Shao Hua, Mao Anqing's wife, published an account of Yang's final days in which Yang tells her captors, "Death is without regret, and I hope that Runzhi's revolution will succeed soon!"

=== Influence of Yang Kaihui's death on Mao ===
Although Mao had relationships with other women, he mourned Kaihui for the rest of his life. According to Chang and Halliday, after learning of her execution he wrote that "the death of Kai-hui cannot be redeemed by a hundred deaths of mine". In the summer of 1937, he recited to the American reporter Agnes Smedley a poem that he had written in her memory. His 1957 poem "Reply to Li Shuyi", written on 11 May of that year, begins with the line "I lost my proud poplar", a pun on her surname, and compares her to the moon goddess Chang'e.

In spring 1957, Li Shuyi, a friend and comrade of Mao and Yang's, wrote a poem in memory of her own husband, Liu Chih-hsün, a member of the Red Army who had been killed in 1933. Sending her poem to Mao, he responded by composing his own poem commemorating both Liu and Kaihui, titled "The Immortals", which he would subsequently publish:

Original Chinese

我失骄杨君失柳
杨柳轻扬直上重霄九
问讯吴刚何所有
吴刚捧出桂花酒

寂寞嫦娥舒广袖
万里长空且为忠魂舞
忽报人间曾伏虎
泪飞顿作倾盆雨

Pinyin

Wǒ shī jiāo yáng jūn shī liǔ
Yáng liǔ qīng yáng zhí shàng chóng xiāo jiǔ
Wèn xùn wú gāng hé suǒ yǒu
Wú gāng pěng chū guì huā jiǔ

Jì mò cháng'é shū guǎng xiù
Wàn lǐ cháng kōng qiě wèi zhōng hún wǔ
Hū bào rén jiān céng fú hǔ
Lèi fēi dùn zuò qīng pén yǔ

Schram's English Translation

I lost my proud poplar, and you your willow,
Poplar and willow soar lightly to the heaven of heavens.
Wu Kang, asked what he has to offer,
Presents them respectfully with cassia wine.

The lonely goddess in the moon spreads her ample sleeves
To dance for these faithful souls in the endless sky.
Of a sudden comes word of the tiger's defeat on earth,
And they break into tears of torrential rain.

Barnstone's English Translation

I lost my proud poplar and you your willow.
As poplar and willow they soar straight up into the ninth heaven
and ask the prisoner of the moon, Wu Gang, what is there.
He offers them wine from the cassia tree.

The lonely lady on the moon, Chang E, spreads her vast sleeves
and dances for these good souls in the unending sky.
Down on earth a sudden report of the tiger's defeat.
Tears fly down from a great upturned bowl of rain.

The allusion to poplar trees is a reference to Yang, whose surname meant "poplar", while that to willows alludes to Liu's surname, which meant "willow".

Chang and Halliday argue that the romantic image of Mao mourning his wife in poetry is misleading, and they describe the real story as one of desertion. Their biography as a whole has been widely criticized by China specialists as highly selective and polemical.

== Poetry ==
Yang wrote poems to express her loneliness and her longing for Mao. One of them, "偶感 [Ǒu Gǎn]" ("Occasional Feeling"), was written in October 1928, two years before her death, and discovered when her former residence was being repaired about 50 years later:

Original Chinese

天阴起溯风，浓寒入肌骨。
念兹远行人，平波突起伏。
足疾可否痊？寒衣是否备？
孤眠谁爱护，是否亦凄苦？
书信不可通，欲问无人语。
恨无双飞翮，飞去见兹人。
兹人不得见，惘怅无已时。

Pinyin

Tiān yīn qǐ sù fēng, nóng hán rù jī gǔ.
Niàn zī yuǎn xíng rén, píng bō tú qǐfú.
Zú jí kě fǒu quán? Hán yī shì fǒu bèi?
Gū mián shuí ài hù, shì fǒu yì qī kǔ?
Shū xìn bù kě tōng, yù wèn wú rén yǔ.
Hèn wú shuāng fēi hé, fēi qù jiàn zī rén.
Zī rén bùdé jiàn, wǎng chàng wú yǐ shí.

English Translation

It is cloudy and very windy; the severe coldness invades my body.
Miss you in the long distance; my feeling goes up and down suddenly.
Is the illness on your feet cured? Are clothes defending against coldness enough?
Sleep alone without any cares and loves; maybe I am also arduous and have tasted too many hardships.
No letters could reach to you and nobody could be asked.
Regret that I have no wings, or I could fly to you.
Couldn’t see you, the time that I take companion with sadness and depression would never come to an end.

== Legacy ==
Yang is officially regarded as a revolutionary martyr, and a monument to her stands in Changsha. Stories about her were largely suppressed while Jiang Qing held power, and they resurfaced in 1977 after the fall of the Gang of Four, when they were used to criticize Jiang by comparison. From 1977, her image appeared on many propaganda posters, mostly designed by rehabilitated veteran artists such as Li Mubai and Jin Xuechen, which showed her in the high-necked white jacket and black skirt of the May Fourth era. In 1978, she was one of the women honored in the stamp series "Glorious Examples of Chinese Women". Her story has inspired dance dramas, films including a 1995 biopic and the 2011 film Beginning of the Great Revival, and Qiu Xiaolong's 2009 novel The Mao Case.

=== Movie and television portrayals ===
==== Films ====
Since the Centennial of the Xinhai Revolution, she has been portrayed by various actresses in several red-themed historical drama movies and television series.

Film
Year	Actress	Title
2011	Zhou Dongyu	The Road Of Exploring
2011	Li Qin	The Founding of a Party
2017	Li Qin	The Founding of an Army
2021	Zhou Ye	1921

==== TV ====
TV Series
Year	Actress	Title
2011	Zhang Meng	Epoch-Making
2017	Zhao Hanyingzi	Autumn Harvest Uprising
2023	Zhang Huiwen	Bloody Glory
