= Mao Zejian =

Mao Zedong's cousin (1905–1929)

- 毛澤建
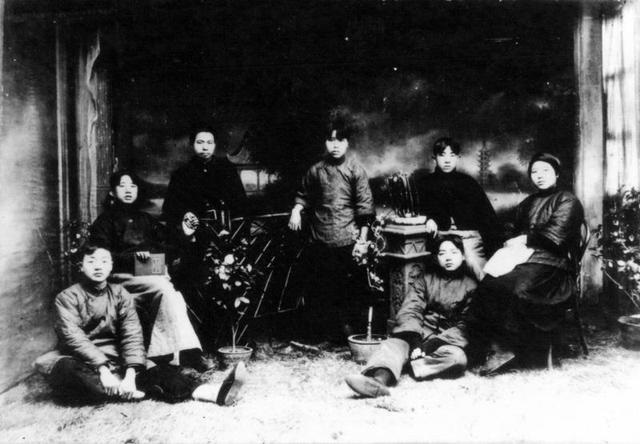
- A group photo of Mao Zejian with her cousin Mao Zetan and others in Changsha, Mao Zejian (middle), Mao Zetan (first from left).
- Born: 5 October 1905; Xiangtan, Hunan, Qing Dynasty
- Died: 20 August 1929 (aged 23); Nanjing, Jiangsu, Republic of China
- Cause of death: Executed by the Kuomintang
- Other name: Mao Zehong (毛澤紅)
- Occupation: Guerrilla soldier
- Relatives: Mao family

Mao Zejian
- Traditional Chinese: 毛澤建
- Simplified Chinese: 毛泽建
Transcriptions
Standard Mandarin
- Hanyu Pinyin: Máo Zéjiàn
- Wade–Giles: Mao2 Tse2-chien4

Mao Zejian (Chinese: 毛澤建; 5 October 1905 – 20 August 1929) was a cousin of Mao Zedong, executed by the Kuomintang following the Autumn Harvest Uprising. She was the daughter of Zedong's paternal uncle Mao Weisheng (Chinese: 毛尉生) and aunt Mrs. Chen (Chinese: 陈氏).

Zejian lived with Mao Zedong's parents from the age of 5 as her father could not afford to feed her. After Zedong's parents died in 1920, Zejian unwillingly married a fruit seller in Changsha at the age of 15, as a child bride, where she was maltreated in the new family. In 1921 she divorced her husband and followed Mao Zedong to Changsha, where she attended women's polytechnic school. She joined the Communist Party in 1923, and changed her name to Mao Daxiang (Chinese: 毛达湘). In the same year she was admitted to Hengyang Provincial Third Women's Normal School. She married a communist member Chen Fen (Chinese: 陈芬) in 1925.

In 1928 she joined an uprising led by Zhu De and Chen Yi in Leiyang, part of the Autumn Harvest Uprising. She then led uprising activities as a guerrilla soldier around Hunan. In May 1928 she was caught in a guerrilla activity together with her husband Chen Fen, and tortured in prison. Her child, born in prison, was killed by Kuomintang forces shortly after birth. She was executed in Hengshan (Chinese: 湖南衡山县) on 20 August 1929, aged 23.
