= Wu Lili =

Chinese translator

Wu Lili (simplified Chinese: 吴莉莉; traditional Chinese: 吳莉莉; 1911–1975), also known as Wu Xuanchen (simplified Chinese: 吴宣晨; traditional Chinese: 吳宣晨), Lily Wu or Wu Guangwei (simplified Chinese: 吴光伟; traditional Chinese: 吳光偉), was a translator and English teacher of Mao Zedong.

== Early life ==
Wu was born in 1911 in Henan Province, to a family of four children, she was the youngest daughter of her family. She moved to Beijing with her family when she was two years old.

By the time her father was the chief of the Beijing Salt Business Bureau. She studied in Christian schools. On March 18, 1926, she and a group of Beijing students held a protest against Duan Qirui's government. This led to them being shot at by the police which killed one protester. She was later transferred to a Business College located in Shanghai and focused on her English studies. She was awarded the highest scholarship for being a hard worker. After this, she travelled back to Beijing, and on March 1, 1934, she married Zhang Yantian (张砚田) at this time she was studying at Beijing Normal University.

== Early career ==
After her graduation, she was teaching in Chinese Opera College in Beijing to support her husband's studies in Japan. She then went to Japan following her husband. But after 3-month study, she travelled back to China and join the Nanking Drama School in October 1935. In early 1936, she performed as The Mayor’s Wife in the comedy play The Government Inspector written by Russian writer Gogol.

== Time in Yan'an ==
Shortly after returning to Beijing, she went to Yan'an to join Yang Hucheng's army, working in civil affairs office of the Shaanxi Government. She then became the translator for CPC. She was a secretary and translator for American journalist Agnes Smedley. In this role, she often translated conversations between Smedley and Mao Zedong. Mao's wife He Zizhen suspected romance with Mao, and made a public scene over this. This led to Mao divorcing He Zizhen. Wu Lili was sent to join a flying squadron of propagandists attached to the army.

== Later life ==
She died in 1975 due to an illness.
