= He Zizhen =

Third wife of Mao Zedong

- 贺子珍
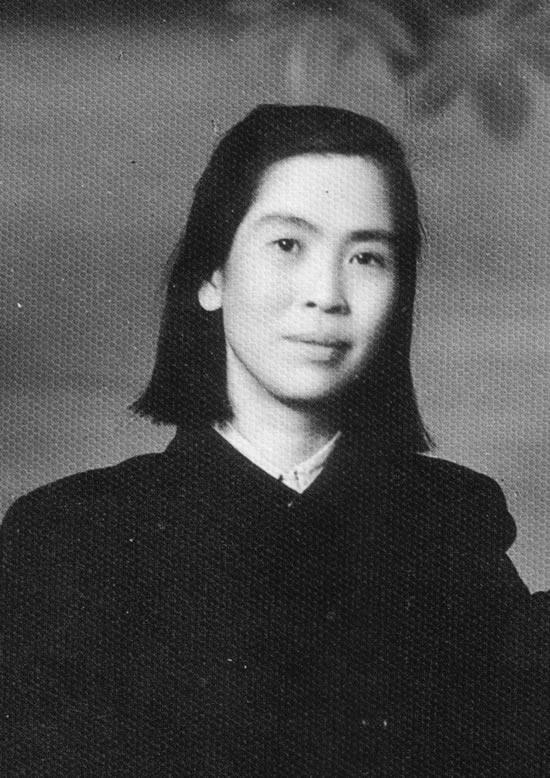
- He Zizhen, 1947
- Born: 20 September 1910; Yunshan, Jiangxi, Qing Dynasty
- Died: 19 April 1984 (aged 73); Shanghai, People's Republic of China
- Other names: Ven Iun, He Guiyuan
- Political party: Chinese Communist Party
- Spouse: Mao Zedong (m. 1928; div. 1937)
- Children: Yang Yuehua, Li Min, Xiao Liuwa and 3 more

Chinese name
- Traditional Chinese: 賀子珍
- Simplified Chinese: 贺子珍
Transcriptions
Standard Mandarin
- Hanyu Pinyin: Hè Zǐzhēn
- Wade–Giles: He (Ho) Tzu-chen

He Zizhen (Chinese: 贺子珍; pinyin: Hè Zizhēn; Wade–Giles: Ho Tzu-chen; 20 September 1910 – 19 April 1984) was a Chinese soldier, revolutionary, and politician who was the third wife of Chairman Mao Zedong from 1928 to 1937 and participated in the Long March.

== Early life and career ==
He Zizhen was born in Yunshan (云山, now Yongxin County), Jiangxi, in 1910, as He Guiyuan (贺桂圆), the second of four children. Her family were impoverished scholar-gentry that ran a tea house and sent He to a free Protestant missionary school in her youth. She joined the Communist Youth League of China in 1925 along with her siblings. He Zizhen later graduated from the Yongxin Girls' School and became a full member of the Chinese Communist Party in 1926.

== Revolutionary life ==
=== Early communist activities ===
As a party member He Zizhen was made head of Yongxin County's Women's Bureau and worked as a traveling propagandist. She fought in the Yongxin uprising of 1927 and served as a communist partisan. An expert in guerrilla warfare and a capable fighter, He Zizhen was also an excellent shooter who earned the nickname of "Two-Gunned Girl General".

=== Relationship with Mao and the Long March ===
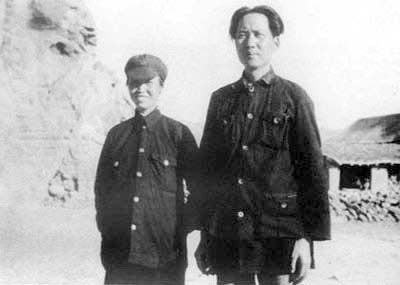
He Zizhen with Mao Zedong

He Zizhen was introduced to Mao Zedong at Jinggangshan by Yuan Wencai, a classmate of her elder brother, in the spring of 1928. Yuan's wife Xie Meixiang recalled that she and Yuan had arranged for He to care for Mao when he fell ill and subsequently encouraged the two to begin a relationship. He and Mao married at the end of June 1928.

He and Mao's granddaughter Kong Dongmei recounted that He had told her a different version of events, with Mao having pursued He and the pair marrying in May 1928.

When He and Mao married, Mao's wife Yang Kaihui was still alive but, according to Xie Meixiang, Mao believed Yang had already been killed in the White Terror. In late 1927 Mao had asked a trader called Wu Fushou to look for Yang in Changsha; the first time, Wu had returned with no news but the second time he visited Changsha he heard false news that Yang had been killed. Wu returned to Jinggangshan and told Mao that Yang had died. The Party's contact network between Hunan and Jiangxi had been severed so there was no other news. In 1930, Yang was executed in Changsha on the orders of warlord He Jian.

While with Mao, He Zizhen restricted herself to clerical work and served as Mao's secretary. Despite this, she was still severely injured by shrapnel in 1935 and needed to be carried by stretcher on parts of the Long March, suffering 17 gunshot wounds during it.

He Zizhen had three daughters and three sons with Mao Zedong – she was pregnant ten times in her life– but except for their daughter, Li Min, all of them either died young or were separated from the family. This was partially due to the constant movement of the communists as they worked to evade the Kuomintang. Their eldest daughter, Yang Yuehua, who was left to a local family in Fujian, was found and recognized by He Zizhen's brother in 1973, but never had the chance to meet Mao or He. Being closely pursued and having given birth to a daughter, He glanced at her and was carried back to the Long March, leaving 13 yuan and a note behind. Two English researchers who retraced the entire Long March in 2002–2003 located a woman whom they believe might be a missing child left in the care of others by Mao and He in 1935.

In 1936, while still on the long march, He Zizhen helped Jin Weiying to give birth to Li Tieying, son of Head of the Organization Department of the Chinese Communist Party, Li Weihan. Liu Ying and Li Jianzhen also assisted with the birth.

=== Divorce from Mao and sojourn in Russia ===
In 1937, Mao had allegedly begun an affair with Wu Lili, the interpreter of journalist Agnes Smedley. After a confrontation with Mao, He Zizhen traveled, pregnant, to the Soviet Union for treatment of a wound suffered earlier in battle, later attending the Moscow Institute of Oriental Studies under the pseudonym Wen Yun. In Moscow, in 1938, He Zizhen gave birth to a boy, Xiao Liuwa, who died shortly of pneumonia. Her daughter, Li Min, also suffered pneumonia after arriving in Moscow with Mao Anqing and Mao Anying to accompany He. According to Mao Anying, He Zizhen suffered severe depression after losing yet another child. To support three children, He took in washing, knitted socks, and went logging on weekends. She was confined in a sanatorium between 1942 and 1946.

Mao married Jiang Qing in November 1938 without having formally divorced He.

=== Later life and death ===
Upon her return to China in 1947, she moved to southern China and stayed in Hangzhou for some time, in 1949 becoming the chair of Zhejiang Province Women's Union. She suffered from fluctuating health. Chen Yi, an old friend of He's who was first secretary of Shanghai's municipal Party committee, later arranged for He to be transferred to Shanghai as head of the organisational department of Hongkou District Party committee; Chen arranged He's medical care in Shanghai and for her to visit Qingdao, Lushan and other places to improve her health. Mao Zedong reportedly offered to pay for He's living costs from his publishing income.

In July 1958, after Chen had been transferred to Beijing, He moved to Nanchang where her old friend Zhu Danhua lived; Zhu had been the wife of Mao Zemin and had remarried to Fang Zhichun who was now deputy governor of Jiangxi. The Jiangxi provincial committee provided He with a caretaker, a cook and a secretary while keeping her identity secret.

After 1972, He raised her granddaughter, Kong Dongmei, in Shanghai. Kong recalled that He and Mao would send each other gifts through Li Min. In June 1979, Deng Xiaoping nominated He as an alternate delegate to the fifth Chinese People's Political Consultative Conference following its second session. Together with Li and Kong, He traveled to Beijing and visited the Chairman Mao Memorial Hall.

He spent her last years in hospital in Shanghai, where she died on 19 April 1984. After her memorial service in Shanghai on 25 April 1984, her remains were cremated and then interred at Babaoshan Revolutionary Cemetery.

== Legacy ==
In 2007, a memorial hall was opened in Yongxin for He Zizhen with her daughter, Li Min, present as a guest.
