= Stuart R. Schram =

Stuart Reynolds Schram
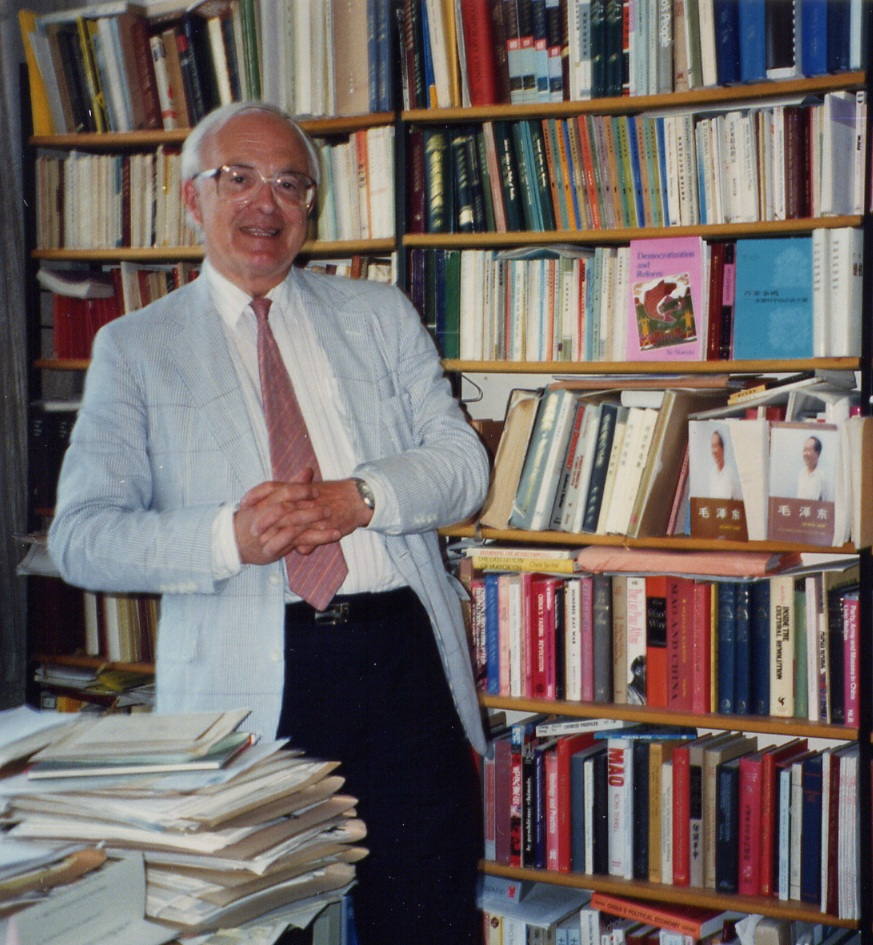
- Schram in his office at SOAS, Summer 1989
- Born: February 27, 1924; Excelsior, Minnesota, United States
- Died: July 8, 2012 (aged 88); France
- Known for: Study of Chinese politics, and biography of Mao Zedong
- Scientific career
- Fields: Physics; Sinology; Political science
- Workplaces: School of Oriental and African Studies

Stuart Reynolds Schram (February 27, 1924 – July 8, 2012) was an American physicist, political scientist and sinologist who specialised in the study of modern Chinese politics. He was particularly well known for his works on the life and thought of Mao Zedong.

== Biography ==
Schram was born in Excelsior, Minnesota, a small lake town outside of Minneapolis, in 1924. His parents, both of whom had professional careers, divorced when he was very young. Schram enrolled at the University of Minnesota, and graduated magna cum laude in 1944. After graduation he was drafted into the US army, and was assigned to work on the Manhattan Project in Chicago, as a member of the team responsible for developing of an atomic bomb. Schram's work on the project involved devising information storage systems for the vast amounts of data generated.

After the end of World War II, influenced by his involvement on the development of the atomic bomb, he decided to change his focus of academic study, and enrolled at Columbia University in New York where he studied for a PhD in political science. He went to France to carry out research for his dissertation on the political behavior of French Protestants, and after receiving his PhD he moved to France.

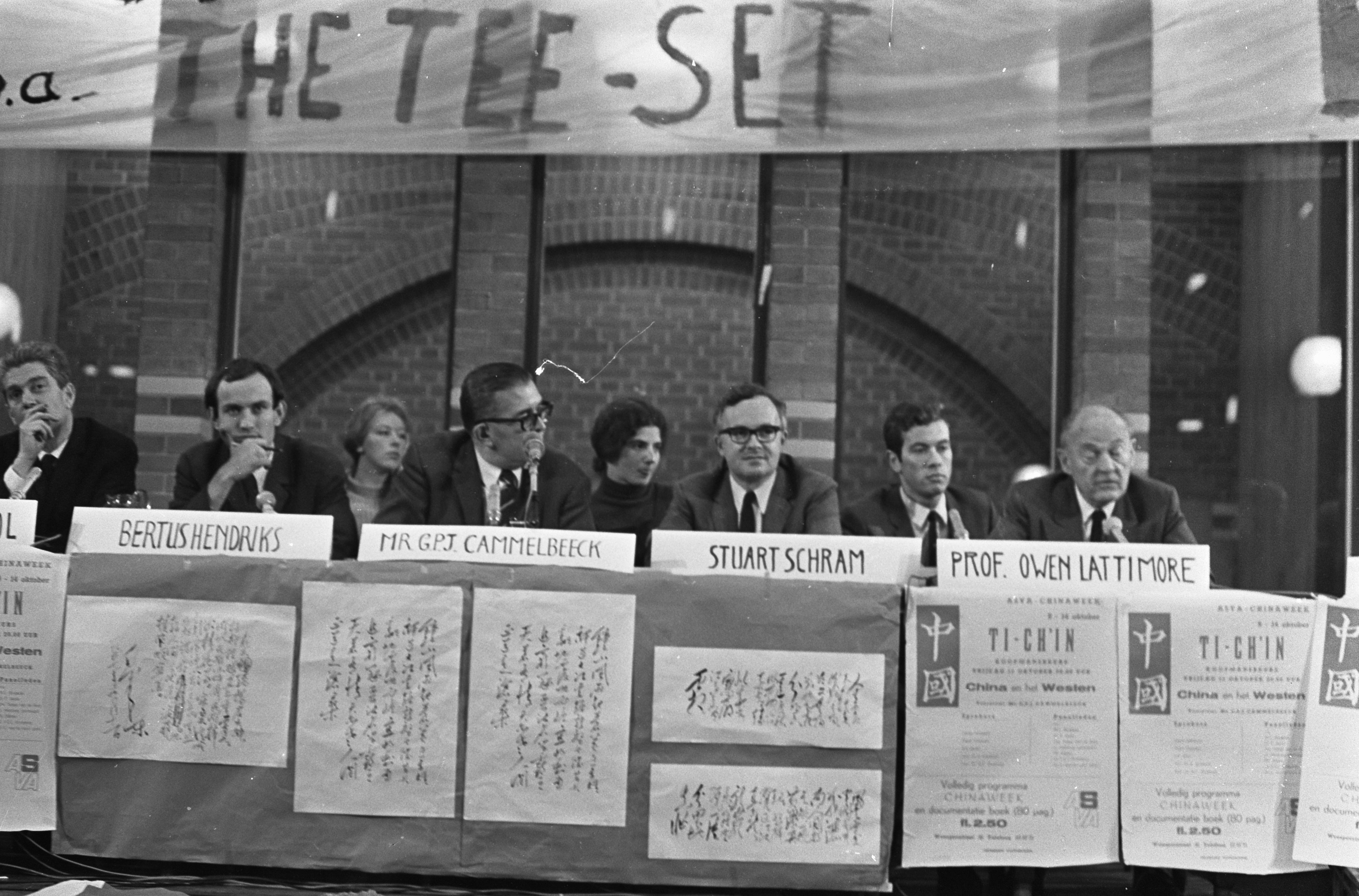
Schram and Lattimore (Amsterdam, 1967)

In the early 1950s, Schram wrote several articles on East and West Berlin. Although these articles were not overtly supportive of the East German regime, they drew the attention of the U.S. State Department, which withdrew his passport. After multiple letters to Minnesota Senator Hubert Humphrey, Schram regained his passport in 1955. From 1954 to 1967 he carried out research at the Fondation Nationale des Sciences Politiques in Paris, but as a non-French citizen he could not become a Professor or oversee doctoral dissertations.

During the late 1950s he turned his attention to Chinese politics, and started to learn Chinese so that he could base his research on the primary sources. He focused his research on Chairman Mao, and by 1963 he had completed a book on the Political Thought of Mao Tse-tung.

In 1966 Penguin Books published his seminal biography of Mao. These works made him prominent in the emerging field of modern China studies. The School of Oriental and African Studies (SOAS) in London offered Schram a chair. Once established in London, Schram led establishment of the Contemporary China Institute and the continued development of journal, China Quarterly. He also translated a large number of unofficial writings by Mao which had been released by zealous Red Guard groups in China in 1967-1968 during the Cultural Revolution.

In 1989 he retired from his position at SOAS, and moved back to America. He was in Beijing in May 1989, when he provided analysis to the British Embassy and predicted that Deng Xiaoping would crack down on the students in Tiananmen Square violently.

At the invitation of Roderick MacFarquhar, Director of the Fairbank Center for Chinese Studies at Harvard University, he started work on the translation and editing of a ten-volume collection of the revolutionary writings of Mao Zedong, seven volumes of which were published before his death. An eighth volume was published in 2015.

He died in France in July 2012 after a stroke. He was survived by his wife Marie-Annick Lancelot, who he married in 1972, and his son, Arthur.

== Legacy ==
Schram made a huge impact on Western understanding of Mao during the 1960s and '70s. Both his translations of new materials along with his interpretation of officially-available sources from Beijing provided insights to government analysts and readers in the general public. However, in the view of his colleague and fellow Mao scholar, Roderick MacFarquhar, Schram wrestled with the problem of making any overall assessment of Mao. MacFarquar recalls Schram saying “I agree with the current Chinese view that Mao’s merits outweighed his faults, but it is not easy to put a figure on the positive and negative aspects. How does one weigh, for example, the good fortune of hundreds of millions of peasants in getting land against the execution, in the course of land reform and the 'Campaign against Counter-Revolutionaries,' or in other contexts, of millions, some of whom certainly deserved to die, but others of whom undoubtedly did not? How does one balance the achievements in economic development during the first Five-Year Plan, or during the whole twenty-seven years of Mao’s leadership after 1949, against the starvation which came in the wake of the misguided enthusiasm of the Great Leap Forward, or the bloody shambles of the Cultural Revolution?” Schram added, “In the last analysis, however, I am more interested in the potential future impact of his thought than in sending Mao as an individual to Heaven or to Hell.” Commenting on Schram's Mao biography and his The Political Thought of Mao Tse-tung, Harvard scholar Tony Saich observed: “I do not think he got Mao wrong but his analysis was very much text-based and this meant that he did not focus so much on the hard politics that Mao engaged in.”

Schram's writings on Mao Zedong were translated into French and German during the 1960s and '70s, and his work on Mao Zedong had a kind of revival in the People's Republic of China in the 1990s and thereafter.

== Selected works ==
- 1954. Protestantism and Politics in France. Corbière & Jugain.
- 1966. Mao Tse-tung. Penguin Books.
- 1967. trans. Mao Tse-Tung: Basic Tactics. Pall Mall Press.
- 1969. The Political Thought of Mao Tse-tung. Praeger.
- 1974. Mao Tse-tung Unrehearsed. Penguin Books. ISBN 9780140217865
- 1975. Chairman Mao Talks to the People: Talks and Letters: 1956–1971. Pantheon Books. ISBN 9780394706412
- 1983. Mao Zedong: a Preliminary Reassessment. Hong Kong: Chinese University Press. ISBN 9789622013032
- 1985. ed. The Scope of State Power in China. School of Oriental and African Studies. ISBN 9780728601222
- 1989. The Thought of Mao Tse-Tung. Cambridge University Press. ISBN 9780521310628
- 1992–. With Nancy Jane Hodes. Mao's Road to Power: Revolutionary Writings 1912-1949. New York: M. E. Sharpe.
  - 1992. Volume I: The Pre-Marxist Period, 1912–1920. ISBN 9781563244575
  - 1992. Volume II: National revolution and social revolution, December 1920–June 1927. ISBN 9781563244308
  - 1995. Volume III: From the Jinggangshan to the establishment of the Jiangxi Soviets, July 1927–December 1930. ISBN 9781563244391
  - 1997. Volume IV: The Rise and Fall of the Chinese Soviet Republic, 1931–1934. ISBN 9781563248917
  - 1998. Volume V: Toward the Second United Front, January 1935–July 1937. ISBN 9780765603494
  - 2004. Volume VI: The New Stage, August 1937–1938. ISBN 9780765607935
  - 2005. Volume VII: New Democracy, 1939–1941 . ISBN 9780765607942
  - 2014. Volume VIII: From Rectification to Coalition Government, 1942-July 1945.
  - 2023. Volume IX: From the Japanese Surrender through the Chinese Communist Party’s Strategic Defense in the Civil War, August 1945 to June 1947.
  - 2023. Volume X: From the Chinese Communist Party’s Strategic Offense to the Establishment of the People's Republic of China, July 1947 to October 1949.
