= Li Min (daughter of Mao Zedong) =

Daughter of Mao Zedong

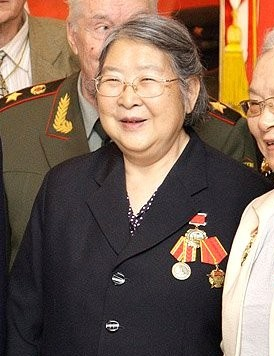
- Li Min in 2010
- Born: 1936 (age 89–90); Zhidan, Yan'an, Shaanxi, Chinese Soviet Republic
- Other name: Mao Min
- Occupation: Politician
- Office: Member of the 10th National Congress of the Chinese People's Political Consultative Conference
- Spouse: Kong Linghua (m. 1959; died 1999)
- Children: 2, including Kong Dongmei
- Parent(s): Mao Zedong; He Zizhen
- Relatives: Mao family

Li Min (Chinese: 李敏; pinyin: Lǐ Mǐn; born 1936), original name Mao Jiaojiao (Chinese: 毛姣姣; pinyin: Máo Jiāojiāo), is a Chinese former politician who was the daughter of Mao Zedong with his third wife, He Zizhen. Her surname is Li rather than Mao, because Mao had changed his name to "Li Desheng" (simplified Chinese: 李德胜; traditional Chinese: 李德勝; pinyin: Lǐ Déshèng) for a period of time to evade capture by the Kuomintang army during the Chinese Civil War.

== Name ==
The names of Li Min and her sister Li Na come from Book 4 of the Analects of Confucius: "ne yu yan er min yu xing" (讷于言而敏于行, meaning slow in speech and earnest in conduct).

== Early life and education ==
Li Min was born during the winter of 1936 in Zhidan, Yan'an. She was initially named Mao Jiaojiao, after Deng Yingchao, wife of Zhou Enlai, who came to congratulate Mao, saw Li and said affectionately: "What a little Jiao Jiao!". In 1937, He Zizhen traveled to the Soviet Union to treat a wound sustained earlier in battle and left Li Min in Yan'an.

In January 1941 after the Southern Anhui incident, Li Min at the age of 4 was sent to the Soviet Union to live with He Zizhen. In 1947, He Zizhen finally returned to China with Li Min and lived in Harbin. Later, Mao Zedong requested someone to bring Li Min back to Beijing. In the early summer of 1949, Li Min returned to Mao Zedong.

After the founding of People's Republic of China, Li Min entered Beijing Bayi School, and after graduation, entered the Girls' Middle School affiliated to Beijing Normal University. After graduating from high school, Li Min was admitted to the Chemistry Department of Beijing Normal University in 1958.

== Cultural Revolution ==
In 1964, Li Min and her husband Kong Linghua moved into an ordinary residence at Bingmasi Hutong in Beijing to begin a real civilian life.

In 1966, when the Cultural Revolution began, Li Min and her husband were criticized by the Red Guards who were unaware of her relationship to Mao. They were ordered to confess and included in the list of May Sixteenth elements, until Lin Biao found out about this and protected her by having her return to Zhongnanhai, much to the shock of the Red Guards. Later when criticizing the "bourgeois reactionary line", they were criticized at the same time. In early 1968, Li Min and her comrades went to the Wangsiying Commune in the suburbs of Beijing to participate in agricultural labor, and returned to the National Defense Science and Technology Commission.

On the evening of 25 October 1969, Li Min was taken to the "May 7th" labor farm in Lianhua Lake, Suiping County in Henan Province along with officials of the National Defense Science and Technology Commission, as part of Vice-Chairman Lin's Order Number 1. Officially, it was to protect the senior leadership from the Soviet Union in the wake of the Zhenbao Island incident but in reality, it was a covert attempt by Lin to protect them from Red Guards in Beijing by spreading them across the country. In early 1971, Li Min went to the cadre school of the Science and Technology Commission. On 13 September, after Marshal Lin Biao's death in a plane crash, Li Min returned to Beijing from the cadre school.

In December 1973, the Party Committee of the National Defense Science and Technology Commission officially made a redress decision for Li Min.

== Later life ==
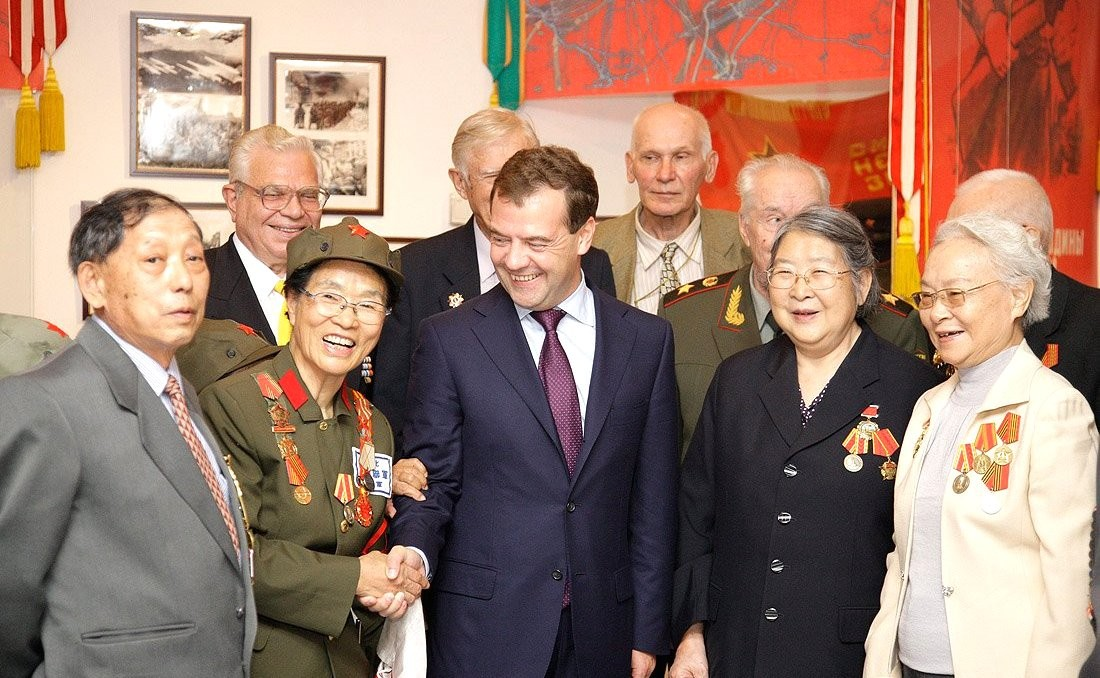
Li Min (front, second from right) with Russian president Dmitry Medvedev, during a meeting with Russian and Chinese World War II veterans (2010)

Li Min was a member of the 10th National Congress of the Chinese People's Political Consultative Conference.

On 2006, on the eve of the 40th anniversary on the start of Cultural Revolution, Li Min and other Mao Zedong's family members went to North Korea to pay homage to her brother Mao Anying, who died during the Korean War.

On 15 April 2015, on behalf of President of Russia Vladimir Putin, Russian Ambassador to China Andrey Denisov presented Li Min with the Jubilee Medal "70 Years of Victory in the Great Patriotic War 1941–1945".

In 2018, rumors regarding Li Min's death in a presumed car accident in North Korea on 22 April, went viral in Chinese social networking site Sina Weibo. But on 24 May, Li Min attended the press conference of the new book My Uncle Zhou Enlai, held by Zhou Bingde, Zhou Enlai's niece, at the Great Hall of the People in Beijing, dispelling rumors of her supposed death.

== Personal life ==
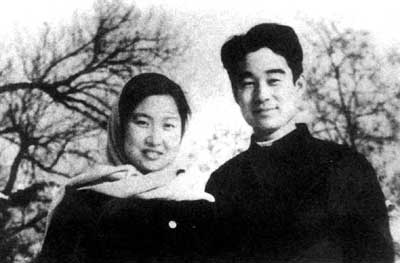
Li Min and Kong Linghua

In 1959, while studying at Beijing Normal University, Li Min met Kong Linghua (simplified Chinese: 孔令华; traditional Chinese: 孔令華; pinyin: Kǒng Lìnghuá). A top student of Beijing Institute of Aeronautics and Astronautics and a classmate of Li Min, they were married in the same year.

They had one son, Kong Jining (simplified Chinese: 孔继宁; traditional Chinese: 孔繼寧; pinyin: Kǒng Jìníng) and one daughter, Kong Dongmei (simplified Chinese: 孔东梅; traditional Chinese: 孔東梅; pinyin: Kǒng Dōngméi). Kong Dongmei herself has 3 children and is said to be worth an estimated €620 million.

In 1999, while returning from an event commemorating Mao Zedong in Guangzhou, Kong Linghua was involved in a car accident. He later died of heart attack in a hospital, during an operation.
