= Kong Dongmei =

Chinese entrepreneur (born 1972)

- 孔东梅
- Born: 1 January 1972 (age 54); Shanghai, China
- Occupation: Entrepreneur
- Spouse: Chen Dongsheng (m. 2011)
- Children: 3
- Mother: Li Min
- Relatives: Mao Zedong (grandfather); He Zizhen (grandmother)

Kong Dongmei (Chinese: 孔东梅; born 1 January 1972) is a Chinese entrepreneur. She is the granddaughter of Mao Zedong.

== Early life ==
Kong Dongmei was born in Shanghai on 1 January 1972, to Li Min, the daughter of Mao Zedong, and Kong Linghua. She was given her name Dongmei by Mao himself. Kong never met her grandfather in person and they only saw each other in pictures. She spent much of her childhood with her grandmother, He Zizhen, in Shanghai until her death in 1984.

== Education and entrepreneur career ==
In 1992, Kong was admitted to Beijing University of Aeronautics and Astronautics (now known as Beihang University), where she majored in English and American literature. In an interview, she recalled: "At that time, I fantasized about opening a small bookstore and living a petty bourgeois life of reading Hemingway’s novels, drinking coffee and raising a cat."

In 1996, she joined the then newly established Taikang Life Insurance Company and in 1999, she went to the United States to study at University of Pennsylvania, where she graduated with a major in international politics. After her graduation, she returned to China in 2001 and founded the Beijing Dongrun Juxiang Bookstore Co., Ltd. Located at 798 Art Zone, the bookstore sells literature and paraphernalia related to Mao Zedong and communism. During this time, she studied for her doctorate at Peking University.

In 2009, she visited Taiwan as part of a delegation from mainland China to promote cultural and educational ties, and met with John Chiang, the grandson of former Republic of China leader Chiang Kai-shek. The meeting was then seen as a sign of the improvement of Cross-Strait relations. In 2013, Chinese magazine New Fortune published the '500 Rich List', which featured Kong Dongmei and her husband Chen Dongsheng and ranked them at 242nd position with an estimated 5 billion yuan ($815 million). Her inclusion prompted a debate among Chinese citizens, with some accusing her of betraying her grandfather's ideals.

== Personal life ==
In 1996, after joining the Taikang Life Insurance, Kong met the founder of the company Chen Dongsheng. The couple formally married in 2011 and they have three children.
