= Mao Zedong =

Leader of China from 1949 to 1976

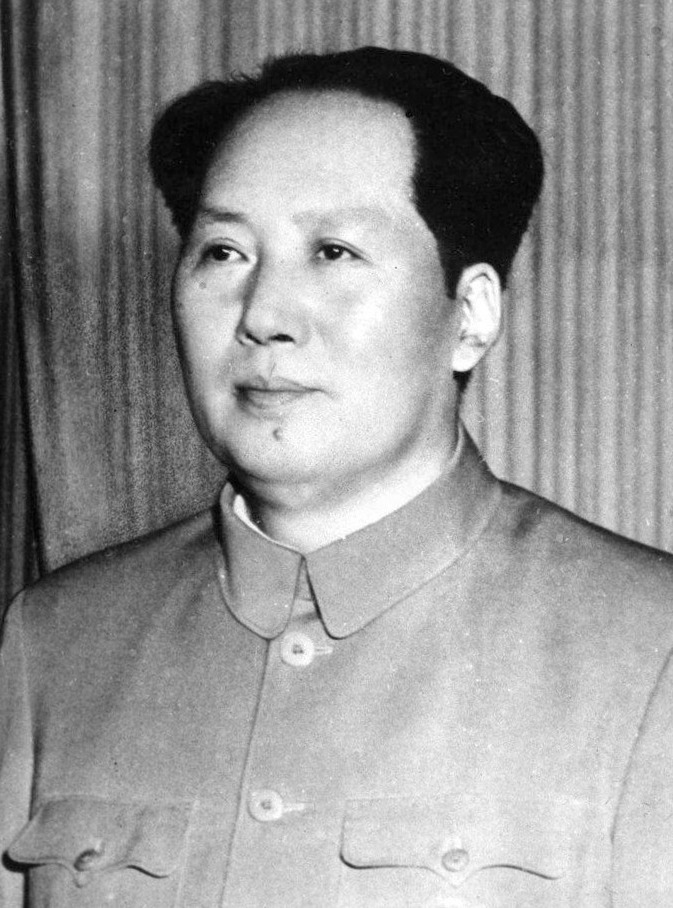
- Formal portrait, 1950

Chairman of the Chinese Communist Party
- In office 20 March 1943 – 9 September 1976
- Deputy: Liu Shaoqi; Lin Biao; Zhou Enlai; Hua Guofeng
- Preceded by: Zhang Wentian (as general secretary)
- Succeeded by: Hua Guofeng

Chairman of the Central Military Commission
- In office 8 September 1954 – 9 September 1976
- Deputy: Zhu De; Lin Biao; Ye Jianying
- Succeeded by: Hua Guofeng

Chairman of the People's Republic of China
- In office 27 September 1954 – 27 April 1959
- Premier: Zhou Enlai
- Deputy: Zhu De
- Preceded by: Yan Xishan (as acting president)
- Succeeded by: Liu Shaoqi

Chairman of the Central People's Government
- In office 1 October 1949 – 27 September 1954
- Premier: Zhou Enlai
- Preceded by: Li Zongren (as acting president)

Chairman of the National Committee of the Chinese People's Political Consultative Conference
- In office 9 October 1949 – 25 December 1954
- Preceded by: Office established
- Succeeded by: Zhou Enlai

Personal details
- Born: 26 December 1893 Shaoshan, Hunan, China
- Died: 9 September 1976 (aged 82) Beijing, China
- Resting place: Chairman Mao Memorial Hall
- Party: Communist Party of China (from 1921)
- Other political affiliations: Kuomintang (1925–1926)
- Spouses: Luo Yixiu (m. 1907; died 1910); Yang Kaihui (m. 1920; died 1930); He Zizhen (m. 1928; div. 1937); Jiang Qing (m. 1938)
- Children: 10, including: Mao Anying; Mao Anqing; Mao Anlong; Yang Yuehua; Li Min; Li Na
- Parents: Mao Yichang; Wen Qimei
- Relatives: Mao family
- Education: Hunan First Normal University

Chinese name
- Simplified Chinese: 毛泽东
- Traditional Chinese: 毛澤東
Transcriptions
Standard Mandarin
- Hanyu Pinyin: Máo Zédōng
- Bopomofo: ㄇㄠˊ ㄗㄜˊ ㄉㄨㄥ
- Wade–Giles: Mao^{2} Tse^{2}-tung^{1}
- Tongyong Pinyin: Máo Zé-dong
- IPA: [mǎʊ tsɤ̌.tʊ́ŋ]
Wu
- Suzhounese: Mau^{2} Zeq^{8}-ton^{1}
Hakka
- Romanization: Mô Chhe̍t-tûng
Yue: Cantonese
- Yale Romanization: Mòuh Jaahk-dūng
- Jyutping: Mou4 zaak6 dung1
- IPA: [mɔw˩ tsak̚˨ tʊŋ˥]
Southern Min
- Hokkien POJ: Mô͘ Te̍k-tong
- Tâi-lô: Môo Ti̍k-tang

Courtesy name
- Simplified Chinese: 润之
- Traditional Chinese: 潤之
Transcriptions
Standard Mandarin
- Hanyu Pinyin: Rùnzhī
- Bopomofo: ㄖㄨㄣˋ ㄓ
- Wade–Giles: Jun^{4}-chih^{1}
- Tongyong Pinyin: Rùn-jhih
- IPA: [ɻwə̂n.ʈʂɻ̩́]
Yue: Cantonese
- Yale Romanization: Yeuhn-jī
- Jyutping: Jeon6 zi1
- IPA: [jɵn˨ tsi˥]
Southern Min
- Hokkien POJ: Lūn-chi
- Central institution membership: 1964–1976: Member, National People's Congress; 1954–1959: Member, National People's Congress; 1938–1976: Member, 6th, 7th, 8th, 9th, 10th Politburo; 1938–1976: Member, 6th, 7th, 8th, 9th, 10th Central Committee; Other offices held: 1954–1959: Chairman of the People's Republic of China; 1954–1976: Chairman, CCP Central Military Commission; 1954–1959: President and Chairman, National Defence Council; 1954–1976: Honorary Chairman, CPPCC National Committee; 1949–1954: Chairman, Central People's Revolutionary Military Commission; 1949–1954: Chairman, CPPCC National Committee; 1949–1954: Chairman, PRC Central People's Government; 1943–1956: Chairman, CCP Central Secretariat; 1936–1949: Chairman, CCP Central Military Commission
- Paramount Leader of the People's Republic of China: (Inaugural holder); Hua Guofeng →

Mao Zedong (Note: /ˈmaʊ (t)səˈtʊŋ/; Chinese: 毛泽东; pinyin: Máo Zédōng pronounced [mǎʊ tsɤ̌.tʊ́ŋ]; traditionally romanised as Mao Tse-tung. In this Chinese name, the family name is Mao and Ze is a generation name. While the pinyin-derived spelling Mao Zedong is increasingly common, the Wade–Giles-derived spelling Mao Tse-tung continues to be used in modern publications to some extent.) (26 December 1893 – 9 September 1976) was a Chinese revolutionary and political theorist who founded the People's Republic of China (PRC) and was its paramount leader from 1949 until his death in 1976. Most political control he exercised came through his position as Chairman of the Chinese Communist Party (CCP). (Note: Mao Zedong held the CCP leader position under the title of "Chairman of the CCP Central Politburo" from 20 March 1943 until 19 June 1945 and "Chairman of the CCP Central Committee" from 19 June 1945 until his death on 9 September 1976.) His political philosophy, known as Mao Zedong Thought, was promoted as a Chinese adaptation of Marxism–Leninism, and has influenced communist political movements and organizations worldwide.

Born to a peasant family in Shaoshan, Hunan, Mao studied in Changsha and was influenced by the 1911 Revolution and ideas of Chinese nationalism and anti-imperialism. He was introduced to Marxism while working as a librarian at Peking University, and later participated in the May Fourth Movement of 1919. In 1921, Mao became a founding member of the CCP. After the start of the Chinese Civil War, he helped build the Chinese Red Army, and developed a strategy of guerrilla warfare. In 1935, Mao became leader of the CCP during the Long March, a military retreat to the Yan'an Soviet in Shaanxi. The CCP allied with the Kuomintang (KMT) in 1937, but the civil war resumed after Japan's surrender in 1945. He defeated the Nationalist government, which withdrew to the island of Taiwan in 1949.

Mao led land redistribution and industrialisation campaigns, suppressed political opponents, and intervened in the Korean War. Afterwards, a brief period of liberalisation, known as the Hundred Flowers Campaign, was also suppressed. From 1958 to 1962, Mao oversaw the Great Leap Forward, a campaign that aimed to collectivise agriculture and industrialise the country, followed by the Great Chinese Famine. In 1966, Mao launched the Cultural Revolution, which was marked by violent class struggle, destruction of historical artifacts, and Mao's cult of personality. Mao died in 1976. He was initially succeeded by Hua Guofeng, then in 1978 by Deng Xiaoping.

China under his leadership has been described as a totalitarian regime which resulted in tens of millions of deaths, mainly through famine, as well as political persecution, prison labor, and executions. He is credited with transforming China from a semi-colony into a major world power and promoting literacy, women's rights, basic healthcare, education, and an increased life expectancy. He is recognized for his role in ending imperialism and consolidating the Chinese state. Under Mao's leadership, the PRC replaced the Republic of China as a permanent member of the United Nations Security Council, and became the fifth state to possess nuclear weapons.

== Early life ==
=== Youth and the Xinhai Revolution: 1893–1911 ===
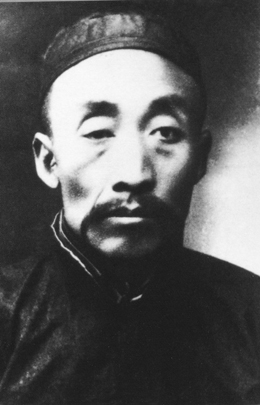
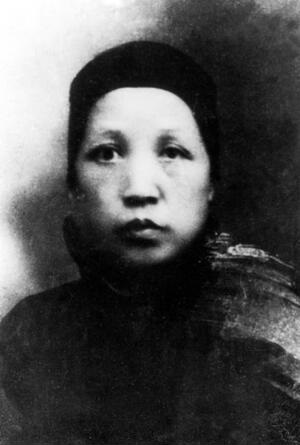
Mao Zedong's parents: Mao Yichang (left) and Wen Qimei (right)

Mao Zedong was born on 26 December 1893, near Shaoshan village in Hunan, during the Qing dynasty. His father, Mao Yichang, was a formerly impoverished peasant who had become one of the wealthiest farmers in Shaoshan. Growing up in rural Hunan, Mao described his father as a stern disciplinarian, who would beat him and his three siblings, the boys Zemin and Zetan, as well as an adopted sister/cousin, Zejian. Mao's mother, Wen Qimei, was a devout Buddhist who tried to temper her husband's strict attitude. Mao too became a Buddhist, but abandoned this faith in his mid-teenage years. At age 8, Mao was sent to Shaoshan Primary School. Learning the value systems of Confucianism, he later admitted that he did not enjoy the classical Chinese texts preaching Confucian morals, instead favouring classic novels like Romance of the Three Kingdoms and Water Margin. At age 13, Mao finished primary education, and his father united him in an arranged marriage to the 17-year-old Luo Yixiu, thereby uniting their land-owning families. Mao refused to recognise her as his wife, becoming a fierce critic of arranged marriage and temporarily moving away. Luo was locally disgraced and died of dysentery in 1910 at 20 years old.

Working on his father's farm, Mao read voraciously and developed a "political consciousness" from Zheng Guanying's booklet which lamented the deterioration of Chinese power and argued for the adoption of representative democracy. Mao also read translations of works by Western authors including Adam Smith, Montesquieu, Jean-Jacques Rousseau, Charles Darwin, and Thomas Huxley. Interested in history, Mao was inspired by the military prowess and nationalistic fervour of George Washington and Napoleon Bonaparte. His political views were shaped by Gelaohui-led protests which erupted following a famine in Changsha, the capital of Hunan; Mao supported the protesters' demands, but the armed forces suppressed the dissenters and executed their leaders. The famine spread to Shaoshan, where starving peasants seized his father's grain. He disapproved of their actions as morally wrong, but claimed sympathy for their situation. At age 16, Mao moved to a higher primary school in nearby Dongshan, where he was bullied for his peasant background.

In 1911, Mao began secondary school in Changsha. Revolutionary sentiment was strong in the city, where there was widespread animosity towards Emperor Puyi's absolute monarchy and many were advocating republicanism. The republicans' figurehead was Sun Yat-sen, a Hawaiian-educated Christian who led the Tongmenghui society. In Changsha, Mao was influenced by Sun's newspaper, The People's Independence (Minli bao), and called for Sun to become president in a school essay. As a symbol of rebellion against the Manchu monarch, Mao and a friend cut off their queue pigtails, a sign of subservience to the emperor.

Inspired by Sun's republicanism, the army rose up across southern China, sparking the Xinhai Revolution. Changsha's governor fled, leaving the city in republican control. Supporting the revolution, Mao joined the rebel army as a private soldier, but was not involved in fighting or combat. The northern provinces remained loyal to the emperor, and hoping to avoid a civil war, Sun—proclaimed "provisional president" by his supporters—compromised with the monarchist general Yuan Shikai. The monarchy was abolished, creating the Republic of China, but the monarchist Yuan became president. With the revolution over, Mao resigned from the army in 1912, after six months as a soldier. Around this time, Mao discovered socialism from a newspaper article; proceeding to read pamphlets by Jiang Kanghu, the student founder of the Chinese Socialist Party, Mao remained interested yet unconvinced by the idea.

=== Fourth Normal School of Changsha: 1912–1919 ===
Over the next few years, Mao Zedong enrolled in and dropped out of a police academy, a soap-production school, a law school, an economics school, and the government-run Changsha Middle School. Studying independently, he spent much time in Changsha's library, reading core works of classical liberalism such as Adam Smith's The Wealth of Nations and Montesquieu's The Spirit of the Laws, as well as the works of western scientists and philosophers such as Darwin, Mill, Rousseau, and Spencer. Viewing himself as an intellectual, years later he admitted that at this time he thought himself better than working people. He was inspired by Friedrich Paulsen, a neo-Kantian philosopher and educator whose emphasis on the achievement of a carefully defined goal as the highest value led Mao to believe that strong individuals were not bound by moral codes but should strive for a great goal. His father saw no use in his son's intellectual pursuits, cut off his allowance and forced him to move into a hostel for the destitute.

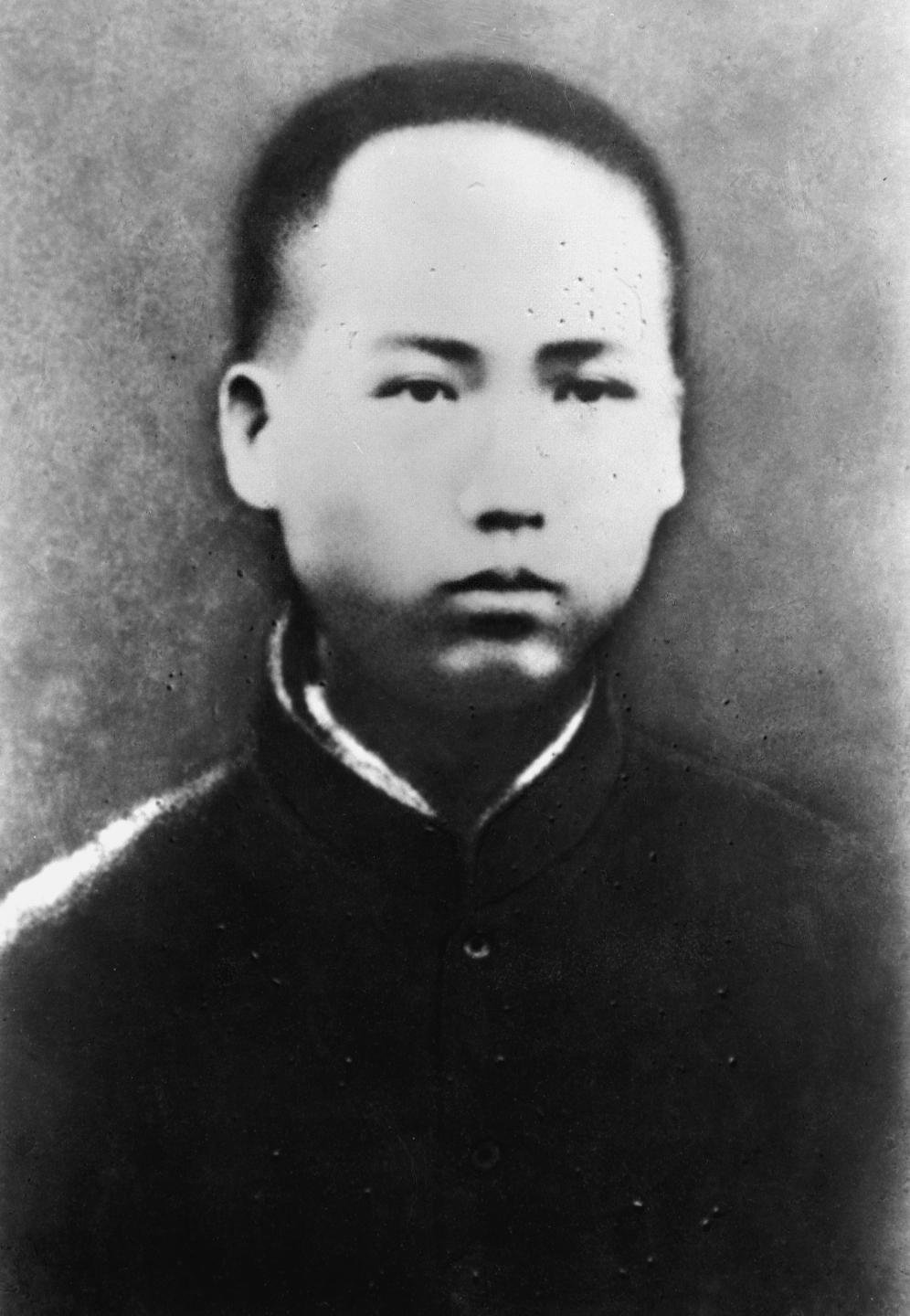
Mao in 1913

Mao wanted to become a teacher and enrolled at the Fourth Normal School of Changsha, which soon merged with the First Normal School of Hunan, widely seen as the best in Hunan. Befriending Mao, professor Yang Changji urged him to read a radical newspaper, New Youth (Xin qingnian), the creation of his friend Chen Duxiu, a dean at Peking University. Although he was a supporter of Chinese nationalism, Chen argued that China must look to the West to cleanse itself of superstition and autocracy. In his first school year, Mao befriended an older student, Xiao Zisheng; together they went on a walking tour of Hunan, begging and writing literary couplets to obtain food.

A popular student, in 1915 Mao was elected secretary of the Students' Society. He organised the Association for Student Self-Government and led protests against school rules. Mao published his first article in New Youth in April 1917, instructing readers to increase their physical strength to serve the revolution. He joined the Society for the Study of Wang Fuzhi (Chuan-shan Hsüeh-she), a revolutionary group founded by Changsha literati who wished to emulate the philosopher Wang Fuzhi. In spring 1917, he was elected to command the students' volunteer army, set up to defend the school from marauding soldiers. Increasingly interested in the techniques of war, he took a keen interest in World War I, and also began to develop a sense of solidarity with workers. Mao undertook feats of physical endurance with Xiao Zisheng and Cai Hesen, and with other young revolutionaries they formed the Renovation of the People Study Society in April 1918 to debate Chen Duxiu's ideas. Desiring personal and societal transformation, the Society gained 70–80 members, many of whom would later join the Communist Party. Mao graduated in June 1919, ranked third in the year.

== Early revolutionary activity ==
=== Beijing, anarchism, and Marxism: 1917–1919 ===
Mao moved to Beijing, where his mentor Yang Changji had taken a job at Peking University. Yang thought Mao exceptionally "intelligent and handsome", securing him a job as assistant to the university librarian Li Dazhao, who would become an early Chinese Communist. Li authored a series of New Youth articles on the October Revolution in Russia, during which the Communist Bolshevik Party under the leadership of Vladimir Lenin had seized power. Lenin was an advocate of the socio-political theory of Marxism, first developed by the German intellectuals Karl Marx and Friedrich Engels, and Li's articles added Marxism to the doctrines in the Chinese revolutionary movement.

Mao was influenced by Peter Kropotkin's anarchism. Chinese anarchists, such as Cai Yuanpei, Chancellor of Peking University, called for complete social revolution in social relations, family structure, and women's equality, rather than the simple change in the form of government called for by earlier revolutionaries. He joined Li's Study Group and "developed rapidly toward Marxism" during the winter of 1919. Paid a low wage, Mao lived in a cramped room with seven other Hunanese students, but believed that Beijing's beauty offered "vivid and living compensation". A number of his friends took advantage of the anarchist-organised Mouvement Travail-Études to study in France, but Mao declined, perhaps because of an inability to learn languages. Mao raised funds for the movement, however.

At the university, Mao was snubbed by other students due to his rural Hunanese accent and lowly position. He joined the university's Philosophy and Journalism Societies and attended lectures and seminars by the likes of Chen Duxiu, Hu Shih, and Qian Xuantong. Mao's time in Beijing ended in the spring of 1919, when he travelled to Shanghai with friends who were preparing to leave for France. He did not return to Shaoshan, where his mother was terminally ill. She died in October 1919 and her husband died in January 1920.

=== New Culture and political protests: 1919–1920 ===
On 4 May 1919, students in Beijing gathered at Tiananmen Square to protest the Chinese government's weak resistance to Japanese expansion in China. Patriots were outraged at the influence given to Japan in the Twenty-One Demands in 1915, the complicity of Duan Qirui's Beiyang government, and the betrayal of China in the Treaty of Versailles, wherein Japan was allowed to receive territories in Shandong which had been surrendered by Germany. These demonstrations ignited the nationwide May Fourth Movement and fuelled the New Culture Movement which blamed China's diplomatic defeats on social and cultural backwardness.

Reacting to U.S. President Woodrow Wilson's support for Japan retaining the former German possessions in Shandong despite his rhetoric of self-determination, Mao described Wilson as "an ant on a hot skillet." The result of the Treaty of Versailles contributed to Mao's view that "in foreign affairs all past alliances or Entente were the union of international bullies" and that fixing the irrational and unjust international system required revolution.

In Changsha, Mao had begun teaching history at the Xiuye Primary School and organising protests against the pro-Duan Governor of Hunan Province, Zhang Jingyao, popularly known as "Zhang the Venomous" due to his corrupt and violent rule. In late May, Mao co-founded the Hunanese Student Association with He Shuheng and Deng Zhongxia, organising a student strike for June and in July 1919 began production of a weekly radical magazine, Xiang River Review. Using vernacular language that would be understandable to the majority of China's populace, he advocated the need for a "Great Union of the Popular Masses", and strengthened trade unions able to wage non-violent revolution. His ideas were not Marxist, but heavily influenced by Kropotkin's concept of mutual aid.

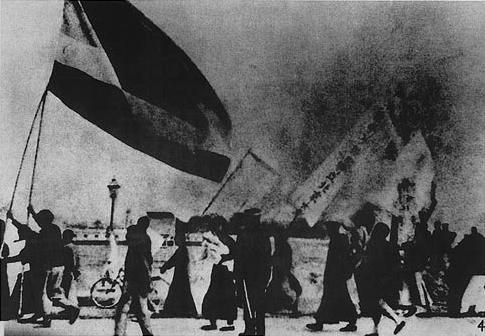
Students in Beijing rallying during the May Fourth Movement

Zhang banned the Student Association, but Mao continued publishing after assuming editorship of the liberal magazine New Hunan (Xin Hunan) and authored articles in popular local newspaper Ta Kung Pao. Several of these advocated feminist views, calling for the liberation of women in Chinese society; Mao was influenced by his forced arranged-marriage. In fall 1919, Mao organized a seminar in Changsha studying economic and political issues, as well as ways to unite the people, the feasibility of socialism, and issues regarding Confucianism. During this period, Mao involved himself in political work with manual labourers, setting up night schools and trade unions. In December 1919, Mao helped organise a general strike in Hunan, securing some concessions, but Mao and other student leaders felt threatened by Zhang, and Mao returned to Beijing, visiting the terminally ill Yang Changji. Mao found that his articles had achieved a level of fame among the revolutionary movement, and set about soliciting support in overthrowing Zhang. Coming across newly translated Marxist literature by Thomas Kirkup, Karl Kautsky, and Marx and Engels—notably The Communist Manifesto—he came under their increasing influence, but was still eclectic in his views.

Mao visited Tianjin, Jinan, and Qufu, before moving to Shanghai, where he worked as a laundryman and met Chen Duxiu, noting that Chen's adoption of Marxism "deeply impressed me at what was probably a critical period in my life". In Shanghai, Mao met an old teacher of his, Yi Peiji, a revolutionary and member of the Kuomintang (KMT), or Chinese Nationalist Party, which was gaining increasing support and influence. Yi introduced Mao to General Tan Yankai, a senior KMT member who held the loyalty of troops stationed along the Hunanese border with Guangdong. Tan was plotting to overthrow Zhang, and Mao aided him by organising the Changsha students. In June 1920, Tan led his troops into Changsha, and Zhang fled. In the subsequent reorganisation of the provincial administration, Mao was appointed headmaster of the junior section of the First Normal School. Now receiving a large income, he married Yang Kaihui, daughter of Yang Changji, in the winter of 1920.

=== Founding the Chinese Communist Party: 1921–1922 ===
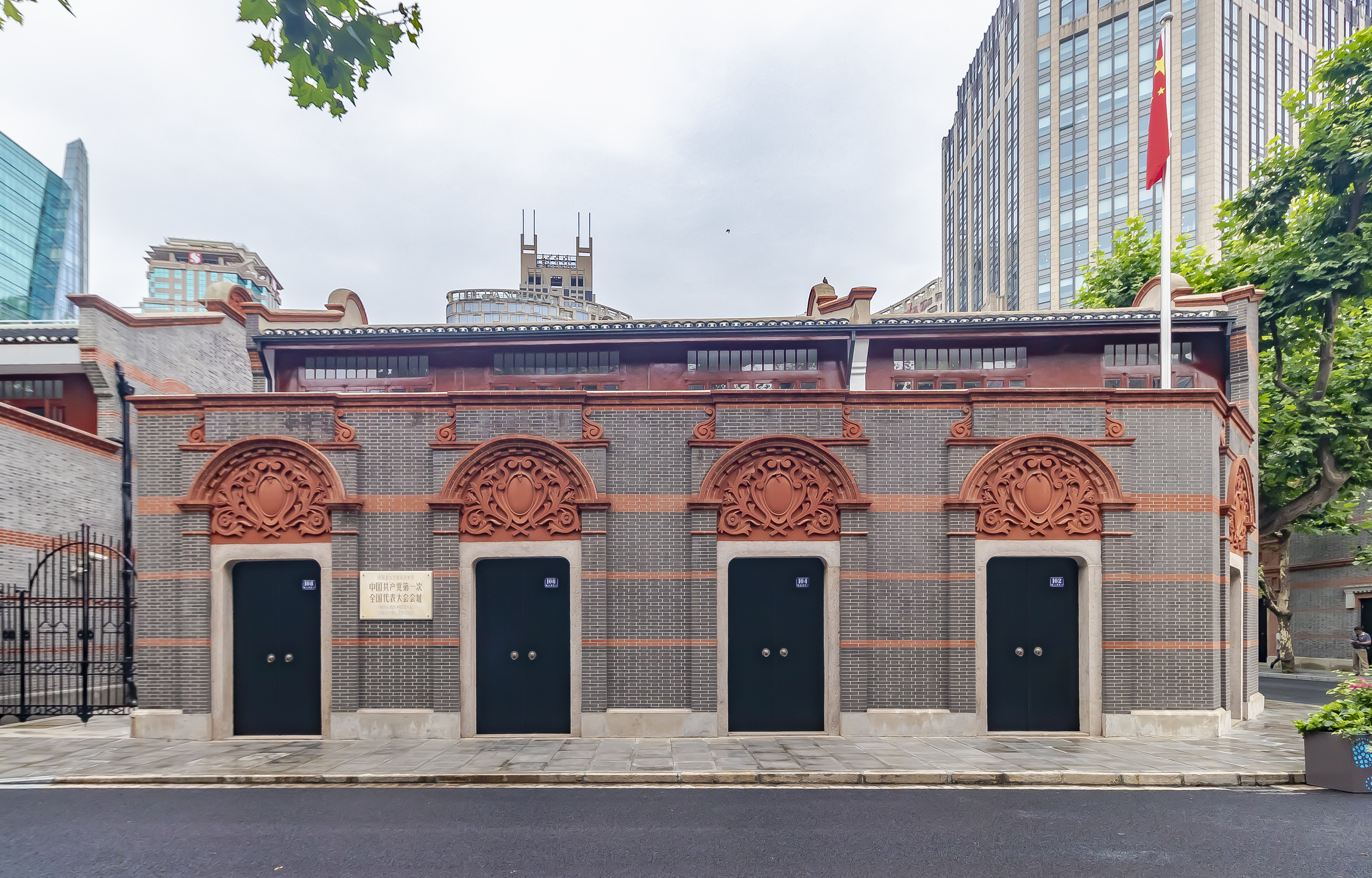
Location of the first Congress of the Chinese Communist Party in July 1921, in Xintiandi, former French Concession, Shanghai

The Chinese Communist Party was founded by Chen Duxiu and Li Dazhao in the Shanghai French Concession in 1921 as a study society and informal network. Mao set up a Changsha branch, also establishing a branch of the Socialist Youth Corps and a Cultural Book Society which opened a bookstore to propagate revolutionary literature throughout Hunan. He was involved in the movement for Hunan autonomy, in the hope that a Hunanese constitution would increase civil liberties and make his revolutionary activity easier. When the movement was successful in establishing provincial autonomy under a new warlord, Mao forgot his involvement. By 1921, small Marxist groups existed in Shanghai, Beijing, Changsha, Wuhan, Guangzhou, and Jinan; it was decided to hold a central meeting, which began in Shanghai on 23 July 1921. The first session of the National Congress of the Chinese Communist Party was attended by 13 delegates, Mao included. After the authorities sent a police spy to the congress, the delegates moved to a boat on South Lake near Jiaxing, in Zhejiang, to escape detection. Although Soviet and Comintern delegates attended, the first congress ignored Lenin's advice to accept a temporary alliance between the Communists and the "bourgeois democrats" who also advocated national revolution; instead they stuck to the orthodox Marxist belief that only the urban proletariat could lead a socialist revolution.

Mao was party secretary for Hunan stationed in Changsha, and to build the party there he followed a variety of tactics. In August 1921, he founded the Self-Study University, through which readers could gain access to revolutionary literature, housed in the premises of the Society for the Study of Wang Fuzhi, a Qing dynasty Hunanese philosopher who had resisted the Manchus. He joined the YMCA Mass Education Movement to fight illiteracy, though he edited the textbooks to include radical sentiments. He continued organising workers to strike against the administration of Hunan Governor Zhao Hengti. Yet labour issues remained central. The successful and famous Anyuan coal mines strikes (contrary to later Party historians) depended on both "proletarian" and "bourgeois" strategies. Liu Shaoqi and Li Lisan and Mao not only mobilised the miners, but formed schools and cooperatives and engaged local intellectuals, gentry, military officers, merchants, Red Gang dragon heads and even church clergy. Mao's labour organizing work in the Anyuan mines also involved his wife Yang Kaihui, who worked for women's rights, including literacy and educational issues, in the nearby peasant communities. Although Mao and Yang were not the originators of this political organizing method of combining labour organizing among male workers with a focus on women's rights issues in their communities, they were among the most effective at using this method. Mao's political organizing success in the Anyuan mines resulted in Chen Duxiu inviting him to become a member of the Communist Party's Central Committee.

Mao claimed that he missed the July 1922 Second Congress of the Communist Party in Shanghai because he lost the address. Adopting Lenin's advice, the delegates agreed to an alliance with the "bourgeois democrats" of the KMT for the good of the "national revolution". Communist Party members joined the KMT, hoping to push its politics leftward. Mao enthusiastically agreed with this decision, arguing for an alliance across China's socio-economic classes, and eventually rose to become propaganda chief of the KMT. Mao was a vocal anti-imperialist and in his writings he lambasted the governments of Japan, the UK and US, describing the latter as "the most murderous of hangmen".

=== Collaboration with the Kuomintang: 1922–1927 ===
Mao giving a speech (no audio)

At the 3rd National Congress of the Chinese Communist Party in Shanghai in June 1923, the delegates reaffirmed their commitment to working with the KMT. Supporting this position, Mao was elected to the Party Committee, taking up residence in Shanghai. At the First KMT Congress, held in Guangzhou in early 1924, Mao was elected an alternate member of the KMT Central Executive Committee, and put forward four resolutions to decentralise power to urban and rural bureaus. His enthusiastic support for the KMT earned him the suspicion of Li Li-san, his Hunan comrade.

In late 1924, Mao returned to Shaoshan, perhaps to recuperate from an illness. He found that the peasantry were increasingly restless and some had seized land from wealthy landowners to found communes. This convinced him of the revolutionary potential of the peasantry, an idea advocated by the KMT leftists but not the Communists. Mao and many of his colleagues also proposed the end of cooperation with the KMT, which was rejected by the Comintern representative Mikhail Borodin. In the winter of 1925, Mao fled to Guangzhou after his revolutionary activities attracted the attention of Zhao's regional authorities. There, he ran the 6th term of the KMT's Peasant Movement Training Institute from May to September 1926. The Peasant Movement Training Institute under Mao trained cadres and prepared them for militant activity, taking them through military training exercises and getting them to study basic left-wing texts.

When party leader Sun Yat-sen died in May 1925, he was succeeded by Chiang Kai-shek, who moved to marginalise the left-KMT and the CCP. Mao nevertheless supported Chiang's National Revolutionary Army, who embarked on the Northern Expedition attack in 1926 on warlords. In the wake of this expedition, peasants rose up, appropriating the land of the wealthy landowners, who were in many cases killed. Such uprisings angered senior KMT figures, who were themselves landowners, emphasising the growing class and ideological divide within the revolutionary movement.

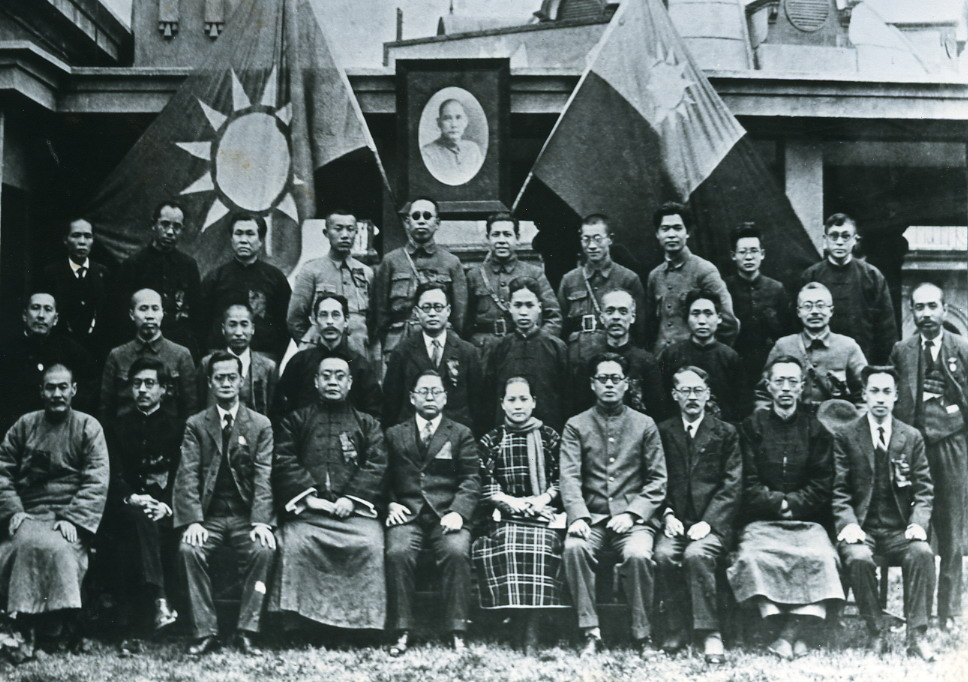
Third Plenum of the KMT Central Executive Committee in March 1927. Mao is third from the right in the second row.

In March 1927, Mao appeared at the Third Plenum of the KMT Central Executive Committee in Wuhan, which sought to strip General Chiang of his power by appointing Wang Jingwei leader. There, Mao played an active role in the discussions regarding the peasant issue, defending a set of "Regulations for the Repression of Local Bullies and Bad Gentry", which advocated the death penalty or life imprisonment for anyone found guilty of counter-revolutionary activity, arguing that in a revolutionary situation, "peaceful methods cannot suffice". In April 1927, Mao was appointed to the KMT's five-member Central Land Committee, which also included Deng Yanda, Xu Qian, Ku Meng-yu, and Tan Pingshan. Together, the five were tasked with deliberating land reform policies, drafting proposals, and coordinating efforts to implement agrarian change under the Wuhan government. He also urged peasants to refuse to pay rent. Mao led another group to put together a "Draft Resolution on the Land Question", which called for the confiscation of land belonging to "local bullies and bad gentry, corrupt officials, militarists and all counter-revolutionary elements in the villages". Proceeding to carry out a "Land Survey", he stated that anyone owning over 30 mou (four and a half acres), constituting 13% of the population, were uniformly counter-revolutionary. He accepted that there was great variation in revolutionary enthusiasm across the country, and that a flexible policy of land redistribution was necessary. Presenting his conclusions at the Enlarged Land Committee meeting, many expressed reservations, some believing that it went too far, and others not far enough. Ultimately, his suggestions were only partially implemented.

== Civil War ==
=== Nanchang and Autumn Harvest Uprisings: 1927 ===
Flag of the Chinese Workers' and Peasants' Red Army

Fresh from the success of the Northern Expedition against the warlords, Chiang turned on the Communists, who then numbered in the tens of thousands across China. Chiang ignored the orders of the Wuhan-based leftist KMT government and marched on Shanghai, a city controlled by Communist militias. As the Communists awaited Chiang's arrival, he unleashed the White Terror, massacring 5,000 with the aid of the Green Gang. In Beijing, 19 leading Communists were killed by Zhang Zuolin. That May, tens of thousands of Communists and those suspected of being communists were killed, and the CCP lost approximately 15,000 of its 25,000 members.

The CCP continued supporting the leftist KMT government in Wuhan, a position Mao initially supported, but by the time of the CCP's Fifth Congress he had changed his mind, deciding to stake all hope on the peasant militia. The question was rendered moot when the Wuhan government expelled all Communists from the KMT on 15 July. The CCP founded the Workers' and Peasants' Red Army of China, better known as the "Red Army", to battle Chiang. A battalion led by General Zhu De was ordered to take the city of Nanchang on 1 August 1927, in what became known as the Nanchang Uprising. They were initially successful, but were forced into retreat after five days, marching south to Shantou, and from there they were driven into the wilderness of Fujian. Mao was appointed commander-in-chief of the Red Army and led four regiments against Changsha in the Autumn Harvest Uprising, in the hope of sparking peasant uprisings across Hunan. On the eve of the attack, Mao composed a poem—the earliest of his to survive—titled "Changsha". His plan was to attack the KMT-held city from three directions on 9 September, but the Fourth Regiment deserted to the KMT cause, attacking the Third Regiment. Mao's army made it to Changsha, but could not take it; by 15 September, he accepted defeat and with 1000 survivors marched east to the Jinggang Mountains of Jiangxi.

=== Base in Jinggangshan: 1927–1928 ===
革命不是請客吃飯，不是做文章，不是繪畫繡花，不能那樣雅緻，那樣從容不迫，文質彬彬，那樣溫良恭讓。革命是暴動，是一個階級推翻一個階級的暴烈的行動。

Revolution is not a dinner party, nor an essay, nor a painting, nor a piece of embroidery; it cannot be so refined, so leisurely and gentle, so temperate, kind, courteous, restrained and magnanimous. A revolution is an insurrection, an act of violence by which one class overthrows another.

— Mao, February 1927

The CCP Central Committee, hiding in Shanghai, expelled Mao from their ranks and from the Hunan Provincial Committee, as punishment for his "military opportunism", for his focus on rural activity, and for being too lenient with "bad gentry". The more orthodox Communists especially regarded the peasants as backward and ridiculed Mao's idea of mobilizing them. They nevertheless adopted three policies he had long championed: the immediate formation of workers' councils, the confiscation of all land without exemption, and the rejection of the KMT. Mao's response was to ignore them. He established a base in Jinggangshan City, an area of the Jinggang Mountains, where he united five villages as a self-governing state, and supported the confiscation of land from rich landlords, who were "re-educated" and sometimes executed. He ensured that no massacres took place in the region, and pursued a more lenient approach than that advocated by the Central Committee. In addition to land redistribution, Mao promoted literacy and non-hierarchical organizational relationships in Jinggangshan, transforming the area's social and economic life and attracted many local supporters.

Mao proclaimed that "Even the lame, the deaf and the blind could all come in useful for the revolutionary struggle", he boosted the army's numbers, incorporating two groups of bandits into his army, building a force of around 1,800 troops. He laid down rules for his soldiers: prompt obedience to orders, all confiscations were to be turned over to the government, and nothing was to be confiscated from poorer peasants. In doing so, he moulded his men into a disciplined, efficient fighting force.

敵進我退，
敵駐我騷，
敵疲我打，
敵退我追。

When the enemy advances, we retreat.
When the enemy rests, we harass him.
When the enemy avoids a battle, we attack.
When the enemy retreats, we advance.

— Mao's advice in combating the Kuomintang, 1928

In spring 1928, the Central Committee ordered Mao's troops to southern Hunan, hoping to spark peasant uprisings. Mao was sceptical, but complied. They reached Hunan, where they were attacked by the KMT and fled after heavy losses. Meanwhile, KMT troops had invaded Jinggangshan, leaving them without a base. Wandering the countryside, Mao's forces came across a CCP regiment led by General Zhu De and Lin Biao; they united, and attempted to retake Jinggangshan. They were initially successful, but the KMT counter-attacked, and pushed the CCP back; over the next few weeks, they fought an entrenched guerrilla war in the mountains. The Central Committee again ordered Mao to march to south Hunan, but he refused, and remained at his base. Contrastingly, Zhu complied, and led his armies away. Mao's troops fended the KMT off for 25 days while he left the camp at night to find reinforcements. He reunited with the decimated Zhu's army, and together they returned to Jinggangshan and retook the base. There they were joined by a defecting KMT regiment and Peng Dehuai's Fifth Red Army. In the mountainous area they were unable to grow enough crops to feed everyone, leading to food shortages throughout the winter.

In 1928, Mao met and married He Zizhen, an 18-year-old revolutionary with whom he would go on to have six children.

=== Jiangxi Soviet Republic of China: 1929–1934 ===
In January 1929, Mao and Zhu evacuated the base with 2,000 men and a further 800 provided by Peng, and took their armies south, to the area around Tonggu and Xinfeng in Jiangxi. The evacuation led to a drop in morale, and many troops became disobedient and began thieving; this worried Li Lisan and the Central Committee, who saw Mao's army as lumpenproletariat, that were unable to share in proletarian class consciousness. In keeping with orthodox Marxist thought, Li believed that only the urban proletariat could lead a successful revolution, and saw little need for Mao's peasant guerrillas; he ordered Mao to disband his army into units to be sent out to spread the revolutionary message. Mao replied that while he concurred with Li's theoretical position, he would not disband his army nor abandon his base. Both Li and Mao saw the Chinese Communist Revolution as the key to world revolution, believing that a CCP victory would spark the overthrow of global imperialism and capitalism. In this, they disagreed with the official line of the Soviet government and Comintern. Officials in Moscow desired greater control over the CCP and removed Li from power by calling him to Russia for an inquest into his errors. They replaced him with Soviet-educated Chinese Communists, known as the "28 Bolsheviks", two of whom, Bo Gu and Zhang Wentian, took control of the Central Committee. Mao disagreed with the new leadership, believing they grasped little of the Chinese situation, and he soon emerged as their key rival.

In February 1930, Mao created the Southwest Jiangxi Provincial Soviet Government in the region under his control. In November, he suffered emotional trauma after his second wife Yang Kaihui and sister were captured and beheaded by KMT general He Jian. Facing internal problems, members of the Jiangxi Soviet accused him of being too moderate, and hence anti-revolutionary. In December, they tried to overthrow Mao, resulting in the Futian incident, during which Mao's loyalists tortured many and executed between 2000 and 3000 dissenters. The CCP Central Committee moved to Jiangxi which it saw as a secure area. In November, it proclaimed Jiangxi to be the Soviet Republic of China, an independent Communist-governed state. Although he was proclaimed Chairman of the Council of People's Commissars, Mao's power was diminished, as his control of the Red Army was allocated to Zhou Enlai. Meanwhile, Mao recovered from tuberculosis.

The KMT armies adopted a policy of encirclement and annihilation of the Red armies. Outnumbered, Mao responded with guerrilla tactics influenced by the works of ancient military strategists like Sun Tzu, but Zhou and the new leadership followed a policy of open confrontation and conventional warfare. In doing so, the Red Army successfully defeated the first and second encirclements. Angered at his armies' failure, Chiang Kai-shek personally arrived to lead the operation. He too faced setbacks and retreated to deal with the further Japanese incursions into China. As a result of the KMT's change of focus to the defence of China against Japanese expansionism, the Red Army was able to expand its area of control, eventually encompassing a population of 3 million. Mao proceeded with his land reform program. In November 1931 he announced the start of a "land verification project" which was expanded in June 1933. He also orchestrated education programs and implemented measures to increase female political participation. Chiang viewed the Communists as a greater threat than the Japanese and returned to Jiangxi, where he initiated the fifth encirclement campaign, which involved the construction of a concrete and barbed wire "wall of fire" around the state, which was accompanied by aerial bombardment, to which Zhou's tactics proved ineffective. Trapped inside, morale among the Red Army dropped as food and medicine became scarce. The leadership decided to evacuate.

=== Long March: 1934–1935 ===
An overview map of the Long March

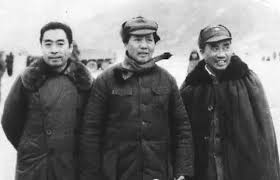
Zhou Enlai, Mao Zedong, and Zhu De during the Long March

On 14 October 1934, the Red Army broke through the KMT line on the Jiangxi Soviet's south-west corner at Xinfeng with 85,000 soldiers and 15,000 party cadres and embarked on the "Long March". In order to make the escape, many of the wounded and the ill, as well as women and children, were left behind, defended by a group of guerrilla fighters whom the KMT massacred. The 100,000 who escaped headed to southern Hunan, first crossing the Xiang River after heavy fighting, and then the Wu River, in Guizhou where they took Zunyi in January 1935. Temporarily resting in the city, they held a conference; here, Mao was elected to a position of leadership, becoming Chairman of the Politburo, and de facto leader of both Party and Red Army, in part because his candidacy was supported by Soviet Premier Joseph Stalin. Insisting that they operate as a guerrilla force, he laid out a destination: the Shenshi Soviet in Shaanxi, Northern China, from where the Communists could focus on fighting the Japanese. Mao believed that in focusing on the anti-imperialist struggle, the Communists would earn the trust of the Chinese people, who in turn would renounce the KMT.

From Zunyi, Mao led his troops to Loushan Pass, where they faced armed opposition but successfully crossed the river. Chiang flew into the area to lead his armies against Mao, but the Communists outmanoeuvred him and crossed the Jinsha River. Faced with the more difficult task of crossing the Tatu River, they managed it by fighting a battle over the Luding Bridge in May, taking Luding. In Moukung, Western Sichuan, they encountered the 50,000-strong CCP Fourth Front Army of Zhang Guotao (who had marched from the mountain ranges around Ma'anshan), and together proceeded to Maoerhkai and then Gansu. Zhang and Mao disagreed over what to do; the latter wished to proceed to Shaanxi, while Zhang wanted to retreat west to Tibet or Sikkim, far from the KMT threat. It was agreed that they would go their separate ways, with Zhu De joining Zhang. Mao's forces proceeded north, through hundreds of kilometres of grasslands, an area of quagmire where they were attacked by Manchu tribesmen and where many soldiers succumbed to famine and disease. Finally reaching Shaanxi, they fought off both the KMT and an Islamic cavalry militia before crossing the Min Mountains and Mount Liupan and reaching the Shenshi Soviet; only 7,000–8,000 had survived. The Long March cemented Mao's status as the dominant figure in the party. In November 1935, he was named chairman of the Military Commission. From this point onward, Mao was the CCP's undisputed leader, even though he would not become party chairman until 1943.

=== World War II: 1935-1945 ===
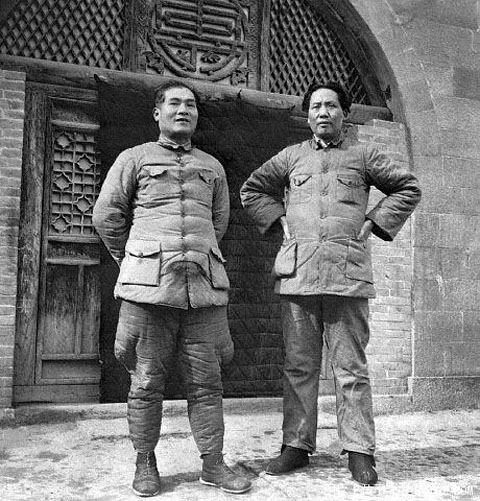
Zhang Guotao (left) and Mao in Yan'an, 1937

Mao's troops arrived at the Yan'an Soviet during October 1935 and settled in Bao'an, until spring 1936. While there, they developed links with local communities, redistributed and farmed the land, offered medical treatment, and began literacy programs. Mao now commanded 15,000 soldiers, boosted by the arrival of He Long's men from Hunan and the return of Zhu De's and Zhang Guotao's armies from Tibet. In February 1936, they established the North West Anti-Japanese Red Army University in Yan'an, through which they trained increasing numbers of new recruits. In January 1937, they began the "anti-Japanese expedition", that sent groups of guerrilla fighters into Japanese-controlled territory to undertake sporadic attacks. In May 1937, a Communist Conference was held in Yan'an to discuss the situation. Western reporters also arrived in the "Border Region" (as the Soviet had been renamed); most notable were Edgar Snow, who used his experiences as a basis for Red Star Over China, and Agnes Smedley, whose accounts brought international attention to Mao's cause.

On the Long March, Mao's wife He Zizhen had been injured by a shrapnel wound to the head. She travelled to Moscow for medical treatment; Mao proceeded to divorce her and marry an actress, Jiang Qing. He Zizhen was reportedly "dispatched to a mental asylum in Moscow to make room" for Qing. Mao moved into a cave-house and spent much of his time reading, tending his garden and theorising. He came to believe that the Red Army alone was unable to defeat the Japanese, and that a Communist-led "government of national defence" should be formed with the KMT and other "bourgeois nationalist" elements to achieve this goal. Although despising Chiang Kai-shek as a "traitor to the nation", on 5 May, he telegrammed the Military Council of the Nanjing National Government proposing a military alliance, a course of action advocated by Stalin. Although Chiang intended to ignore Mao's message and continue the civil war, he was arrested by one of his own generals, Zhang Xueliang, in Xi'an, leading to the Xi'an Incident; Zhang forced Chiang to discuss the issue with the Communists, resulting in the formation of a United Front with concessions on both sides on 25 December 1937.

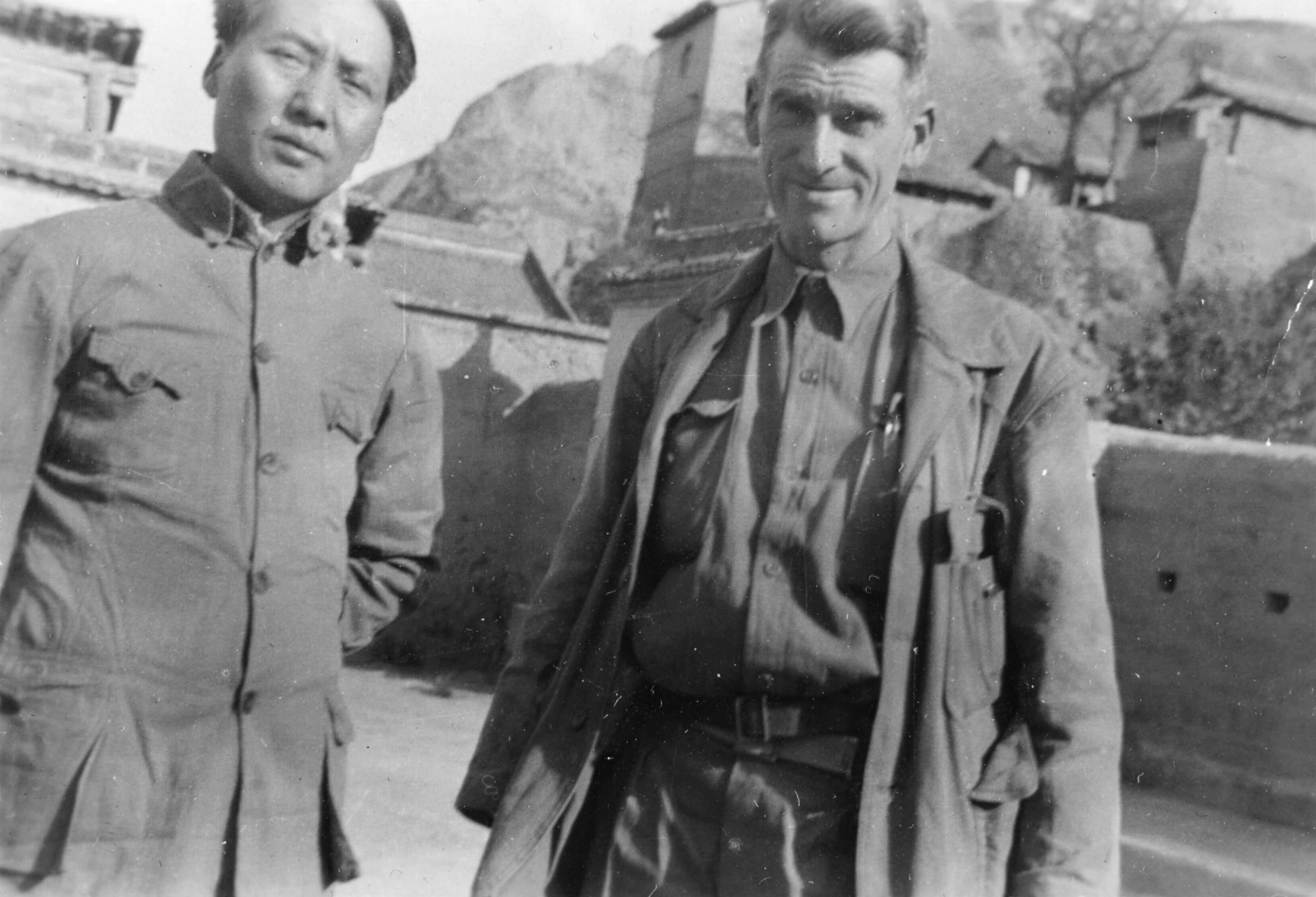
Mao with American military observer Evans Carlson c. 1937

The Japanese had taken both Shanghai and Nanjing—resulting in the Nanjing Massacre, an atrocity Mao never spoke of all his life—and was pushing the Kuomintang government inland to Chongqing. The Japanese's brutality led to increasing numbers of Chinese joining the fight, and the Red Army grew from 50,000 to 500,000. In August 1938, the Red Army formed the New Fourth Army and the Eighth Route Army, which were nominally under the command of Chiang's National Revolutionary Army. In August 1940, the Red Army initiated the Hundred Regiments Offensive, in which 400,000 troops attacked the Japanese simultaneously in five provinces. It was a military success that resulted in the death of 20,000 Japanese, the disruption of railways and the loss of a coal mine. From his base in Yan'an, Mao authored several texts for his troops, including Philosophy of Revolution, which offered an introduction to the Marxist theory of knowledge; Protracted Warfare, which dealt with guerrilla and mobile military tactics; and On New Democracy, which laid forward ideas for China's future.

In 1944, the U.S. sent a special diplomatic envoy, called the Dixie Mission, to the Chinese Communist Party. The American soldiers who were sent to the mission were favourably impressed. The party seemed less corrupt, more unified, and more vigorous in its resistance to Japan than the Kuomintang. The soldiers confirmed to their superiors that the party was both strong and popular over a broad area. In the end of the mission, the contacts which the U.S. developed with the Chinese Communist Party led to very little. After the end of World War II, the U.S. continued their diplomatic and military assistance to Chiang Kai-shek and his KMT government forces against the People's Liberation Army (PLA) led by Mao Zedong during the civil war and abandoned the idea of a coalition government which would include the CCP. Likewise, the Soviet Union gave support to Mao by occupying north-eastern China, and secretly giving it to the Chinese communists in March 1946.

== Leadership of China ==
=== Establishment of the People's Republic of China ===
In 1948, the People's Liberation Army starved out the Kuomintang forces occupying Changchun. At least 160,000 civilians are believed to have perished during the siege, which lasted from June until October. PLA lieutenant colonel Zhang Zhenglu, in his book White Snow, Red Blood, compared it to Hiroshima. On 21 January 1949, Kuomintang forces suffered great losses in decisive battles against Mao's forces. In the early morning of 10 December 1949, PLA troops laid siege to Chongqing and Chengdu on mainland China, and Chiang Kai-shek fled from the mainland to Taiwan.

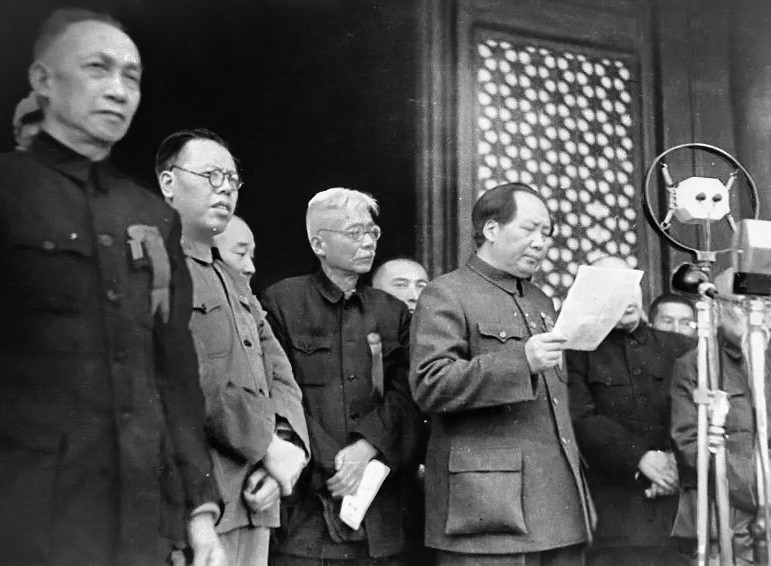
Mao declares the founding of the People's Republic of China on 1 October 1949.

Mao proclaimed the establishment of the People's Republic of China from Tiananmen on 1 October 1949. Mao went to Moscow for talks in the winter of 1949–50. Mao initiated the talks which focused on the political and economic revolution in China, foreign policy, railways, naval bases, and Soviet economic and technical aid. The resulting treaty reflected Stalin's dominance and his willingness to help Mao.

Following the Marxist–Leninist theory of vanguardism, Mao believed that only the correct leadership of the Communist Party could advance China into socialism. Conversely, Mao also believed that mass movements and mass criticism were necessary in order to check the bureaucracy.

=== Korean War ===
Mao pushed the Party to organise campaigns to reform society and extend control. These campaigns were given urgency in October 1950, when the People's Volunteer Army was sent into the Korean War to fight as well as reinforce the armed forces of North Korea, the Korean People's Army, which had been in full retreat. The United States placed a trade embargo on the People's Republic due to its involvement in the Korean War, until Richard Nixon's improvements of relations. At least 180,000 Chinese troops died during the war.

As the Chairman of the Central Military Commission (CMC), Mao was also the Supreme Commander in Chief of the PLA and the People's Republic and Chairman of the Party. Chinese troops in Korea were under the overall command of then newly installed Premier Zhou Enlai, with General Peng Dehuai as field commander and political commissar.

=== Social reform ===
During the land reform campaigns, large numbers of people accused of being "landlords" and "rich peasants" were beaten to death at mass meetings as land was taken from them and given to poorer peasants, which reduced economic inequality. The Campaign to Suppress Counter-revolutionaries targeted bureaucratic bourgeoisie, such as compradors, merchants and Kuomintang officials who were seen by the party as economic parasites or political enemies. In 1976, the U.S. State Department estimated as many as a million were killed in the land reform, and 800,000 killed in the counter-revolutionary campaign.

Mao claimed that a total of 700,000 people were killed in attacks on "counter-revolutionaries" during the years 1950–1952. Because there was a policy to select "at least one landlord, and usually several, in virtually every village for public execution", the number of deaths range between 2 million and 5 million. In addition, at least 1.5 million people, perhaps as many as 4 to 6 million, were sent to "reform through labour" camps where many perished. Mao defended these killings as necessary for the securing of power.

The government is credited with eradicating both consumption and production of opium during the 1950s. Ten million addicts were forced into compulsory treatment, dealers were executed, and opium-producing regions were planted with new crops. Remaining opium production shifted south of the Chinese border into the Golden Triangle region.

=== Three-anti and Five-anti Campaigns ===
In 1951, Mao initiated movements to rid urban areas of corruption; the Three-anti and Five-anti Campaigns. The three-anti campaign was a focused purge of government, industrial and party officials. The five-anti campaign set its sights slightly more broadly, targeting capitalist elements in general. Workers denounced their bosses, spouses turned on their spouses, and children informed on their parents; the victims were often humiliated at struggle sessions, where a targeted person would be verbally and physically abused until they confessed to crimes. Mao insisted that minor offenders be criticised and reformed or sent to labour camps, "while the worst among them should be shot". These campaigns took several hundred thousand additional lives, the vast majority via suicide.

In Shanghai, suicide by jumping from tall buildings became so commonplace that residents avoided walking on the pavement near skyscrapers for fear that suicides might land on them. Some biographers have pointed out that driving those perceived as enemies to suicide was a common tactic during the Mao-era. In his biography of Mao, Philip Short notes that Mao gave explicit instructions in the Yan'an Rectification Movement that "no cadre is to be killed" but in practice allowed security chief Kang Sheng to drive opponents to suicide and that "this pattern was repeated throughout his leadership of the People's Republic".

=== Five-year plans and brief liberalization ===
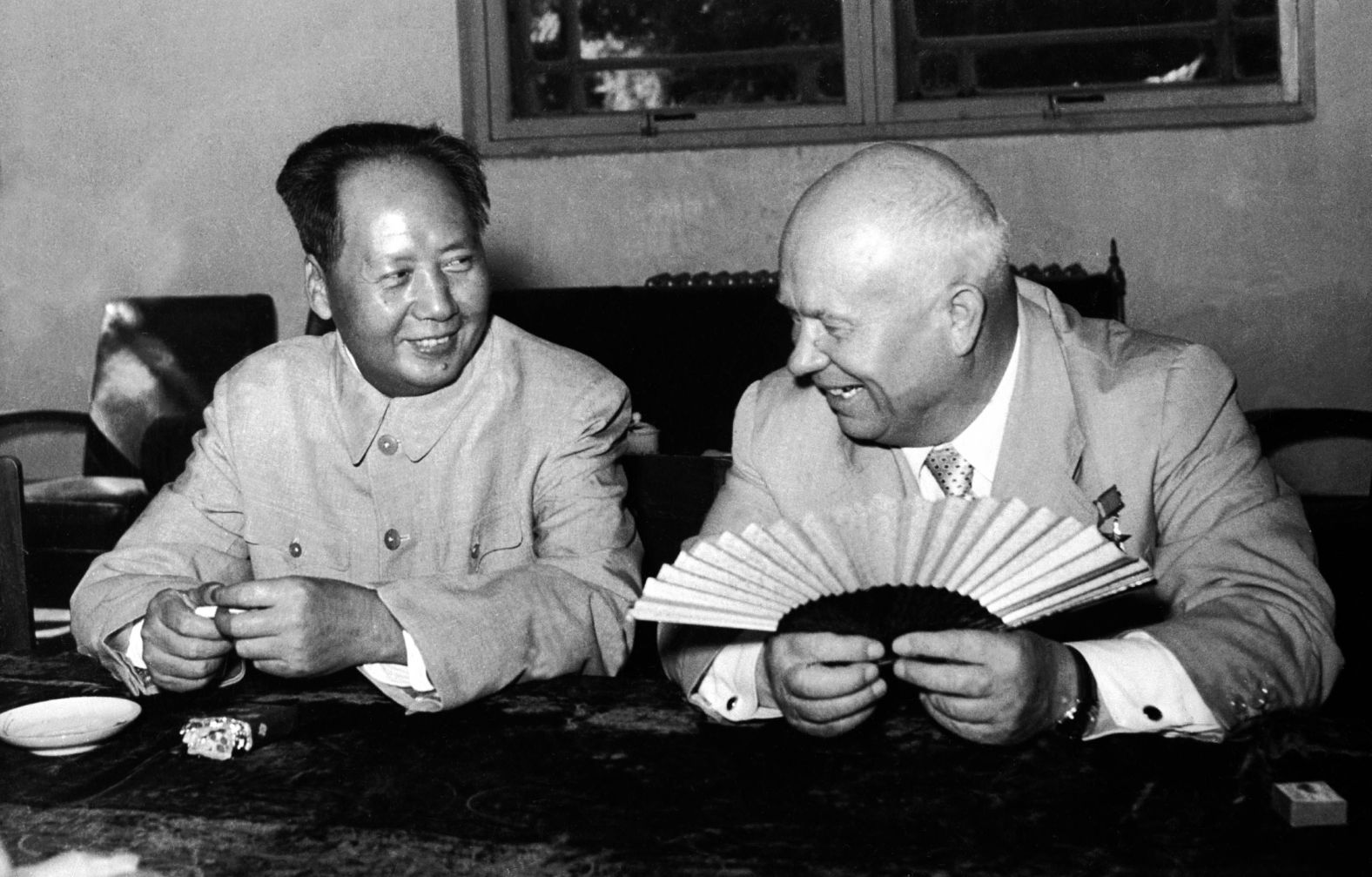
Mao with Soviet leader Nikita Khrushchev in a state visit in Peking, 1957

Mao launched the first five-year plan (1953–1958), which emphasised rapid industrial development. Within industry, iron and steel, electric power, coal, heavy engineering, building materials, and basic chemicals were prioritised with the aim of constructing large and highly capital-intensive plants. Many of these plants were built with Soviet assistance and heavy industry grew rapidly. Agriculture, industry and trade were organised as worker cooperatives. This period marked the beginning of China's rapid industrialisation and it resulted in an enormous success.

Despite being initially sympathetic towards the reformist government of Imre Nagy, Mao feared the "reactionary restoration" in Hungary as the Hungarian Revolution of 1956 continued and became more hardline. Mao opposed the withdrawal of Soviet troops by asking Liu Shaoqi to inform the Soviet representatives to use military intervention against "Western imperialist-backed" protestors and Nagy's government. However, it was unclear to what degree Mao's stance played a role in Nikita Khrushchev's decision to invade Hungary. It was also unclear if China was forced to conform to the Soviet position due to economic concerns and China's poor power projections compared to the USSR. Despite his disagreements with Moscow's hegemony in the Eastern Bloc, Mao viewed the integrity of the international communist movement as more important than the national autonomy of the countries in the Soviet sphere of influence. The Hungarian crisis also influenced Mao's Hundred Flowers Campaign. Mao decided to soften his stance on Chinese intelligentsia and allow them to express their social dissatisfaction and criticisms of the errors of the government. Mao wanted to use this movement to prevent a similar uprising in China. However, as people in China began to criticize the CCP's policies and Mao's leadership following the Hundred Flowers Campaign, Mao cracked down on the movement he initiated and compared it to the "counter-revolutionary" Hungarian Revolution.

During the Hundred Flowers Campaign, Mao indicated his supposed willingness to consider different opinions about how China should be governed. Given the freedom to express themselves, liberal and intellectual Chinese began opposing the Communist Party and questioning its leadership. This was initially tolerated and encouraged. After a few months, Mao's government reversed its policy and persecuted those who had criticised the party, totalling perhaps 500,000, as well as those who were merely alleged to have been critical, in what is called the Anti-Rightist Movement. The movement led to the persecution of at least 550,000 people, mostly intellectuals and dissidents.

=== Military projects ===
United States President Dwight D. Eisenhower's threats during the First Taiwan Strait Crisis to use nuclear weapons against military targets in Fujian province prompted Mao to begin China's nuclear program. Under Mao's Two Bombs, One Satellite program, China developed the atomic and hydrogen bombs in record time and launched a satellite a few years after the Soviet Union launched Sputnik.

Project 523 was a 1967 military project to develop antimalarial medications. It addressed malaria, a serious threat during the Vietnam War. Zhou Enlai convinced Mao Zedong to start the mass project "to keep [the] allies' troops combat-ready", as the meeting minutes put it. Analysis of traditional Chinese medicine led to the development of a class of new antimalarial drugs called artemisinins.

=== Great Leap Forward and famine ===
In January 1958, Mao launched the Great Leap Forward, to transform China from an agrarian to an industrialised nation. The relatively small agricultural collectives that had been formed were merged into far larger people's communes, and many peasants were ordered to work on infrastructure projects and on the production of iron and steel. Some private food production was banned, and livestock and farm implements were brought under collective ownership.

The effect of the diversion of labour to steel production and infrastructure projects, and cyclical natural disasters led to an approximately 15% drop in grain production in 1959 followed by a further 10% decline in 1960 and no recovery in 1961.

To win favour with their superiors and avoid being purged, each layer in the party exaggerated the amount of grain produced under them. Based upon the falsely reported success, party cadres were ordered to requisition a high amount of that fictitious harvest. The result, compounded in some areas by drought and in others by floods, was that farmers were left with little food and many millions starved to death in the Great Chinese Famine. The people of urban areas were given food stamps each month, but the people of rural areas were expected to grow their own crops and give some of the crops back to the government. The death count in rural parts of China surpassed the deaths in the urban centres. The famine was a direct cause of the death of some 30 million Chinese peasants between 1959 and 1962. Many children became malnourished.

In late autumn 1958, Mao condemned the practices used during the Great Leap Forward such as forcing peasants to do labour without enough food or rest which resulted in epidemics and starvation. He also acknowledged that anti-rightist campaigns were a major cause of "production at the expense of livelihood." He refused to abandon the Great Leap Forward, but he did demand that its malpractices be confronted. After the July 1959 clash at Lushan Conference with Peng Dehuai, Mao launched a new anti-rightist campaign along with the radical policies that he previously abandoned. It wasn't until the spring of 1960 that Mao would again express concern about abnormal deaths and other abuses, but he did not move to stop them. Bernstein concludes that the Chairman "wilfully ignored the lessons of the first radical phase for the sake of achieving extreme ideological and developmental goals".

Mao stepped down as President of China on 27 April 1959, but retained other top positions such as Chairman of the Communist Party and of the Central Military Commission. The Presidency was transferred to Liu Shaoqi. Mao eventually abandoned the policy in 1962. Liu Shaoqi and Deng Xiaoping rescued the economy by disbanding the people's communes, introducing elements of private control of peasant smallholdings and importing grain from Canada and Australia to mitigate the worst effects of famine.

At the Lushan Conference in July and August 1959, several ministers expressed concern that the Great Leap Forward had not proved as successful as planned. The most direct of these was Minister of Defence Peng Dehuai. Following Peng's criticism of the Great Leap Forward, Mao made a purge of Peng and his supporters, stifling criticism of the Great Leap policies. A campaign was launched and resulted in party members and ordinary peasants being sent to prison labour camps. Years later the CCP would conclude that as many as six million people were wrongly punished in the campaign.

=== Split from Soviet Union ===
The Sino-Soviet split resulted in Nikita Khrushchev's withdrawal of Soviet technical experts and aid from the country. The split concerned the leadership of world communism. The USSR had a network of Communist parties it supported; China now created its own rival network to battle it out. Lorenz M. Lüthi writes: "The Sino-Soviet split was one of the key events of the Cold War, equal in importance to the construction of the Berlin Wall, the Cuban Missile Crisis, the Second Vietnam War, and Sino-American rapprochement. The split helped to determine the framework of the Second Cold War in general, and influenced the course of the Second Vietnam War in particular."

The split resulted from Khrushchev's more moderate Soviet leadership after the death of Stalin in March 1953. Only Albania openly sided with China, thereby forming an alliance between the two countries. Warned that the Soviets had nuclear weapons, Mao minimised the threat. Struggle against Soviet revisionism and U.S. imperialism was an important aspect of Mao's attempt to direct the revolution in the right direction.

In the late 1950s, Mao wrote reading notes responding to the Soviet Book Political Economy: A Textbook and essays (A Critique of Soviet Economics) responding to Stalin's Economic Problems of Socialism in the USSR. These texts reflect Mao's views that the USSR was becoming alienated from the masses and distorting socialist development.

=== Third Front ===
After the Great Leap Forward, China's leadership slowed the pace of industrialization. It invested more in China's coastal regions and focused on the production of consumer goods. Preliminary drafts of the Third Five Year Plan contained no provision for developing large scale industry in China's interior. After an April 1964 General Staff report concluded that the concentration of China's industry in its major coastal cities made it vulnerable to attack by foreign powers, Mao argued for the development of basic industry and national defence industry in protected locations in China's interior. Although other key leaders did not initially support the idea, the 2 August 1964 Gulf of Tonkin incident increased fears of a potential invasion by the United States and crystallized support for Mao's industrialization proposal, which came to be known as the Third Front. Following the Gulf of Tonkin incident, Mao's own concerns of invasion by the United States increased. He wrote to central cadres, "A war is going to break out. I need to reconsider my actions" and pushed even harder for the creation of the Third Front.

The secretive Third Front construction involved massive projects including extensive railroad infrastructure like the Chengdu–Kunming line, aerospace industry including satellite launch facilities, and steel production industry including Panzhihua Iron and Steel.

Development of the Third Front slowed in 1966, but accelerated again after the Sino-Soviet border conflict at Zhenbao Island, which increased the perceived risk of a Soviet invasion. Third Front construction again decreased after United States President Richard Nixon's 1972 visit to China and the resulting rapprochement. When Reform and Opening up began after Mao's death, China began to wind down Third Front projects. By evenly distributing infrastructure, state investment and human talent throughout the country, the Third Front mitigated regional disparities and ultimately contributed to favourable conditions for later market development.

=== Cultural Revolution ===
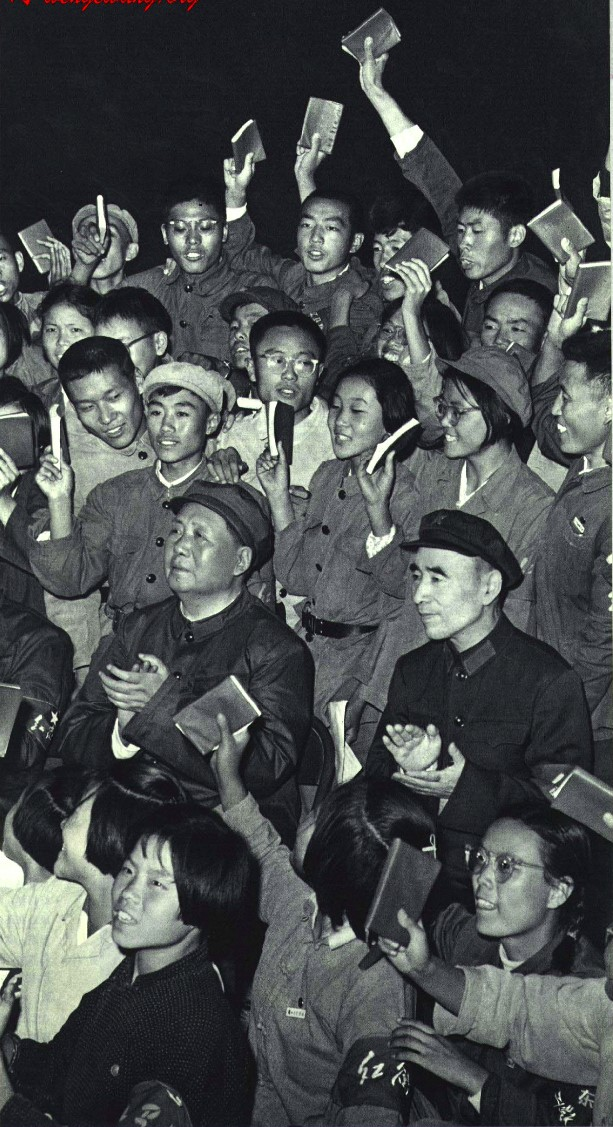
A public appearance of Chairman Mao and Lin Biao among Red Guards, in Beijing, during the Cultural Revolution (November 1966)

天下大亂，達到天下大治。過七、八年又來一次。牛鬼蛇神自己跳出來。他們為自己的階級本性所決定，非跳出來不可。但他們是要整個打倒我們的黨和我本人。現在的任務是要在全黨全國基本上（不可能全部）打倒右派，在七八年後還要有一次橫掃牛鬼蛇神的運動，以後還要多次掃除。

Great disorder under heaven yields to great order. And after seven to eight years, great disorder starts all over again. Monsters and demons leap out. Given their class nature, they cannot do otherwise. The black band is trying to overthrow the Party and to overthrow me. Our present task is to overthrow the rightists (at least partially, for to do so completely is impossible). In seven or eight years another movement will have to be launched to wipe out the monsters and demons, and that will be repeated many times in the future.

— Mao, July 1966

During the early 1960s, Mao began to feel that his personal power was being eroded, and he was conscious that his personal prestige had been damaged by the Great Leap Forward. He also feared that the old ruling elite had been replaced by a new one, as communist revolutions tended to lose their revolutionary zeal after attaining power. Mao believed that a revolution of culture would unseat and unsettle the "ruling class" and keep China in a state of "continuous revolution" that, theoretically, would serve the interests of the majority, rather than a tiny and privileged elite.

The Cultural Revolution led to the destruction of much of China's traditional cultural heritage and the imprisonment of many Chinese citizens, causing widespread upheaval across Chinese society. It is estimated that millions of people perished in the violence of the Cultural Revolution. This included prominent figures such as Liu Shaoqi.

During this period, Mao chose Lin Biao to become his successor. Lin was later officially named as Mao's successor. By 1971, a divide between the two men had become apparent. Lin Biao died on 13 September 1971, in a plane crash over the air space of Mongolia, presumably as he fled China, probably anticipating his arrest. The CCP declared that Lin was planning to depose Mao and posthumously expelled Lin from the party. At this time, Mao lost trust in many of the top CCP figures. The highest-ranking Soviet Bloc intelligence defector, Lt. Gen. Ion Mihai Pacepa claimed he had a conversation with Nicolae Ceaușescu, who told him about a plot to kill Mao with the help of Lin Biao organised by the KGB.

In 1969, Mao declared the Cultural Revolution to be over. Various historians mark the end of the Cultural Revolution in 1976, following Mao's death and the arrest of the Gang of Four. The Central Committee in 1981 officially declared the Cultural Revolution a "severe setback" for the PRC.

An estimate of around 400,000 deaths is a widely accepted minimum figure, according to Maurice Meisner. MacFarquhar and Schoenhals assert that in rural China alone some 36 million people were persecuted, of whom between 750,000 and 1.5 million were killed, with roughly the same number permanently injured.

== Death and aftermath ==
Mao's health declined in his final years, probably aggravated by his chain-smoking. It became a state secret that he suffered from multiple lung and heart ailments during his later years. There are unconfirmed reports that he possibly had Parkinson's disease in addition to amyotrophic lateral sclerosis (ALS), also known as Lou Gehrig's disease. He suffered two major heart attacks, one on 11 May and another on 26 June, then a third on 2 September, rendering him an invalid. He died nearly one week later, shortly after midnight on 9 September 1976, at the age of 82. The Communist Party delayed the announcement of his death until 16:00, when a national radio broadcast announced the news and appealed for party unity.

Mao's embalmed body, draped in the CCP flag, lay in state at the Great Hall of the People for one week. One million Chinese filed past to pay their final respects, many displaying sadness, while foreigners watched on television. Mao's official portrait hung on the wall with a banner reading: "Carry on the cause left by Chairman Mao and carry on the cause of proletarian revolution to the end". On 17 September, the body was taken in a minibus to the 305 Hospital, where his internal organs were preserved in formaldehyde.

On 18 September, guns, sirens, whistles and horns across China were simultaneously blown and a mandatory three-minute silence was observed. Tiananmen Square was packed with millions of people and a military band played "The Internationale". Hua Guofeng concluded the service with a 20-minute-long eulogy atop Tiananmen Gate. Despite Mao's request to be cremated, his body was later permanently put on display in the Mausoleum of Mao Zedong, in order for the Chinese nation to pay its respects.

== Legacy ==
Mao has been called one of the most important and influential individuals in the 20th century. He has also been described as a political intellect, theorist, military strategist, poet, and visionary. Mao's insurgency strategies continue to be used by insurgents, and his political ideology continues to be embraced by many Communist organisations around the world.

Mao has been credited with his role in ending the previous decades of civil war. He has also been credited with having improved the status of women in China and for improving literacy and education. Mao has been credited for boosting literacy, reducing poverty, a near doubling of life expectancy, a near doubling of the population, rapidly developing China's industry and infrastructure, and creating a self-sufficient and self-reliant economy, paving the way for its position as a world power.

Mao's policies resulted in the deaths of tens of millions of people in China during his tenure, mainly due to starvation, but also through persecution, prison labour in laogai, and mass executions. Mao's China has been described as an autocratic and totalitarian regime responsible for mass repression. Mao has been described as one of the great tyrants of the twentieth century.

=== Assessment in China ===
On 27 June 1981, the CCP Central Committee adopted the Resolution on Certain Questions in the History of Our Party since the Founding of the People's Republic of China, which assessed the legacy of the Mao era and the CCP's priorities going forward. The Resolution describes setbacks during the period 1957 to 1964 (although it generally affirms this period) and major mistakes beginning in 1965, attributing Mao's errors to individualist tendencies which arose when he departed from the collective view of the leadership. Regarding Mao's legacy, the CCP's resolution stated that Mao's contributions to the Chinese Communist Revolution far outweigh his mistakes.

In China, a common expression for summarizing Mao's legacy, first attributed to Deng Xiaoping, is that Mao was 70 percent right and 30 percent wrong. In December 2013, a poll from the CCP-run tabloid Global Times, stated that roughly 85% of the 1,045 respondents surveyed felt that Mao's achievements outweighed his mistakes.

Academic Richard Curt Kraus writes that "Ordinary citizens... often remember the Mao years as poor but simple, with greater egalitarianism, a climate of honesty, and honorable, if sometimes zealous, officials." As of 2025, an increasing trend among low-income Chinese is nostalgia for the egalitarianism of the Mao era; this view ties income disparity and political corruption to post-Mao market-oriented economic reforms.

Opposition to Mao can lead to censorship or professional repercussions in mainland China, and is often done in private settings. When a video of Bi Fujian, a television host, insulting Mao at a private dinner in 2015 went viral, Bi garnered the support of Weibo users, with 80% of them saying in a poll that Bi should not apologize amidst backlash from state affiliates. Chinese citizens are aware of Mao's mistakes, but many see Mao as a national hero. He is seen as someone who successfully liberated the country from Japanese occupation during the Second Sino-Japanese War and from Western imperialist exploitation dating back to the Opium Wars. Between 2015 and 2018, The Washington Post interviewed 70 people in China about the Maoist era. A "sizable proportion" commented positively on the era's simplicity, attributing to it the "clear meaning" of life and minimal inequality; they contended that the "spiritual life" was rich. The interviewees simultaneously acknowledged the poor "material life" and other negative experiences under Mao.

On 25 December 2008, China opened the Mao Zedong Square to visitors in his home town of central Hunan Province to mark the 115th anniversary of his birth.

Former CCP official Su Shachi has opined that "he was a great historical criminal, but he was also a great force for good." In a similar vein, journalist Liu Binyan has described Mao as "both monster and a genius." Li Rui, a CCP member who was a member of Mao's secreterial staff for two years at the beginning of the Great Leap Forward, opined that "Mao's way of thinking and governing was terrifying. He put no value on human life. The deaths of others meant nothing to him."

Chen Yun remarked "Had Mao died in 1956, his achievements would have been immortal. Had he died in 1966, he would still have been a great man but flawed. But he died in 1976. Alas, what can one say?" Deng Xiaoping said "I should remind you that Chairman Mao dedicated most of his life to China, that he saved the party and the revolution in their most critical moments, that, in short, his contribution was so great that, without him, the Chinese people would have had a much harder time finding the right path out of the darkness. We also shouldn't forget that it was Chairman Mao who combined the teachings of Marx and Lenin with the realities of Chinese history—that it was he who applied those principles, creatively, not only to politics but to philosophy, art, literature, and military strategy."

=== Assessment in Western world ===
External videos
- Booknotes interview with Philip Short on Mao: A Life, 1 March 2000, C-SPAN

Biographer Philip Short argued that a bit more than half of the millions of deaths under Mao were unintended consequences of famine. Short stated that landlord class were not exterminated as a people due to Mao's belief in redemption through thought reform, and compared Mao with 19th-century Chinese reformers who challenged China's traditional beliefs in the era of China's clashes with Western colonial powers. Short writes that "Mao's tragedy and his grandeur were that he remained to the end in thrall to his own revolutionary dreams. ... He freed China from the straitjacket of its Confucian past, but the bright Red future he promised turned out to be a sterile purgatory."

Alexander V. Pantsov and Steven I. Levine, in their biography, asserted that Mao was both "a successful creator and ultimately an evil destroyer" but also argued that he was a complicated figure who should not be lionised as a saint or reduced to a demon, as he "indeed tried his best to bring about prosperity and gain international respect for his country." They also remarked on Mao's legacy: "A talented Chinese politician, an historian, a poet and philosopher, an all-powerful dictator and energetic organizer, a skillful diplomat and utopian socialist, the head of the most populous state, resting on his laurels, but at the same time an indefatigable revolutionary who sincerely attempted to refashion the way of life and consciousness of millions of people, a hero of national revolution and a bloody social reformer—this is how Mao goes down in history. The scale of his life was too grand to be reduced to a single meaning." Mao's English interpreter Sidney Rittenberg wrote in his memoir that whilst Mao "was a great leader in history", he was also "a great criminal because, not that he wanted to, not that he intended to, but in fact, his wild fantasies led to the deaths of tens of millions of people."

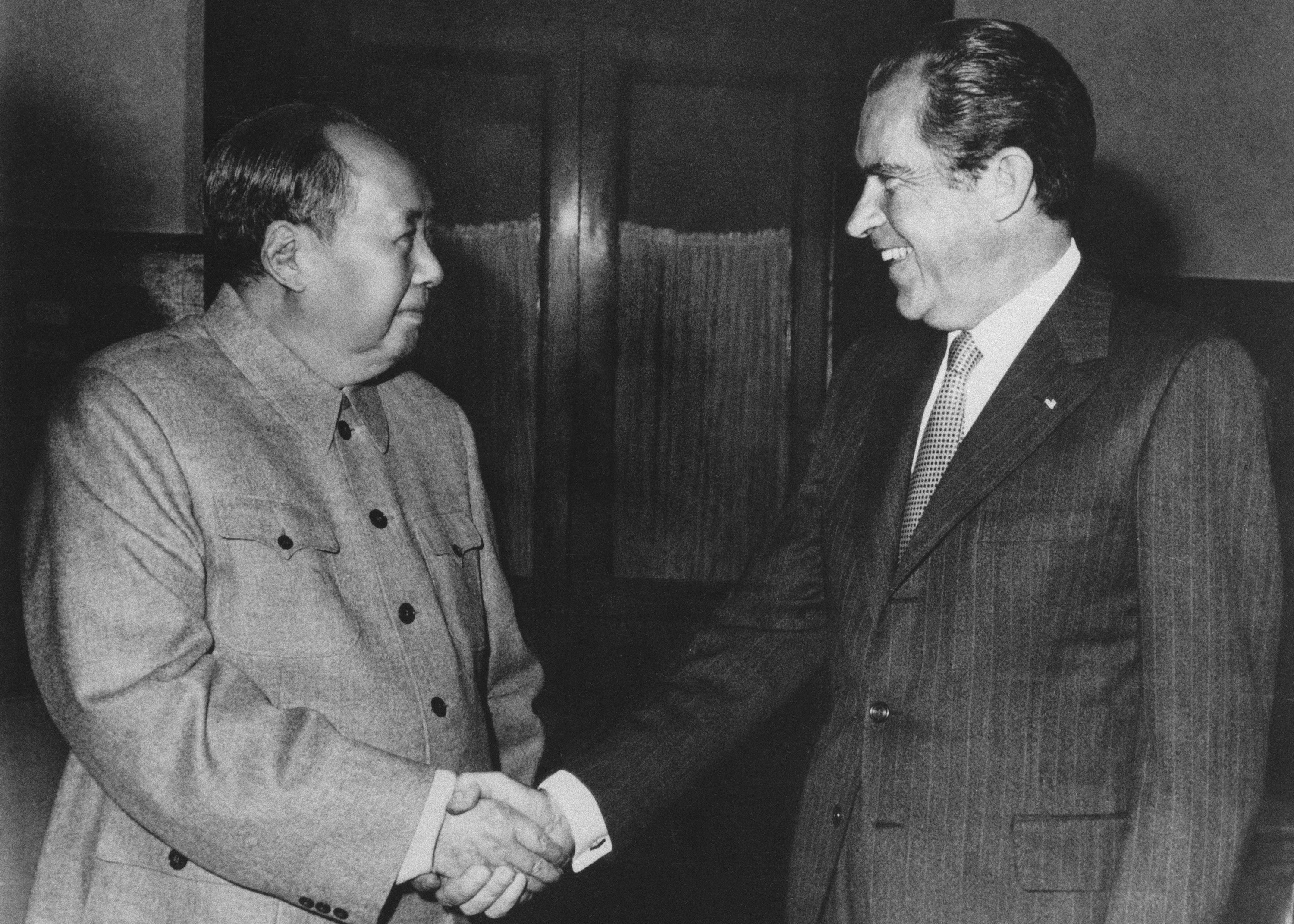
Mao greets U.S. President Richard Nixon during his visit to China in 1972.

The United States placed a trade embargo on the People's Republic as a result of its involvement in the Korean War, until Richard Nixon decided that developing relations with the PRC would be useful. The television series Biography stated: "[Mao] turned China from a feudal backwater into one of the most powerful countries in the World. ... The Chinese system he overthrew was backward and corrupt; few would argue the fact that he dragged China into the 20th century. But at a cost in human lives that is staggering."

John King Fairbank remarked, "The simple facts of Mao's career seem incredible: in a vast land of 400 million people, at age 28, with a dozen others, to found a party and in the next fifty years to win power, organize, and remold the people and reshape the land—history records no greater achievement. Alexander, Caesar, Charlemagne, all the kings of Europe, Napoleon, Bismarck, Lenin—no predecessor can equal Mao Tse-tung's scope of accomplishment, for no other country was ever so ancient and so big as China." In China: A New History, Fairbank and Goldman assessed Mao's legacy: "Future historians may conclude that Mao's role was to try to destroy the age-old bifurcation of China between a small educated ruling stratum and the vast mass of common people. We do not yet know how far he succeeded. The economy was developing, but it was left to his successors to create a new political structure."

Stuart R. Schram said that Mao was an "Eternal rebel, refusing to be bound by the laws of God or man, nature or Marxism, [who] led his people for three decades in pursuit of a vision initially noble, which turned increasingly into a mirage, and then into a nightmare. Was he a Faust or Prometheus, attempting the impossible for the sake of humanity, or a despot of unbridled ambition, drunk with his own power and his own cleverness?" Schram also agreed "with the current Chinese view that Mao's merits outweighed his faults, but it is not easy to put a figure on the positive and negative aspects. How does one weigh, for example, the good fortune of hundreds of millions of peasants in getting land against the execution, in the course of land reform and the 'Campaign against Counter-Revolutionaries,' or in other contexts, of millions, some of whom certainly deserved to die, but others of whom undoubtedly did not? How does one balance the achievements in economic development during the first Five-Year Plan, or during the whole twenty-seven years of Mao's leadership after 1949, against the starvation which came in the wake of the misguided enthusiasm of the Great Leap Forward, or the bloody shambles of the Cultural Revolution?" Schram added, "In the last analysis, however, I am more interested in the potential future impact of his thought than in sending Mao as an individual to Heaven or to Hell."

Maurice Meisner assessed Mao's legacy: "It is the blots on the Maoist record, especially the Great Leap and the Cultural Revolution, that are now most deeply imprinted on our political and historical consciousness. That these adventures were failures colossal in scope, and that they took an enormous human toll, cannot and should not be forgotten. But future historians, without ignoring the failures and the crimes, will surely record the Maoist era in the history of the People's Republic (however else they may judge it) as one of the great modernizing epochs in world history, and one that brought great social and human benefits to the Chinese people."

=== Third World ===
The ideology of Maoism has influenced many communists, mainly in the Third World, including revolutionary movements such as Cambodia's Khmer Rouge, Peru's Shining Path, and the Nepalese revolutionary movement. Under the influence of Mao's agrarian socialism and Cultural Revolution, Pol Pot and the Khmer Rouge conceived of his disastrous Year Zero policies which purged the nation of its teachers, artists and intellectuals and emptied its cities, resulting in the Cambodian genocide. The Revolutionary Communist Party, USA, also claims Marxism–Leninism-Maoism as its ideology, as do other communist parties around the world which are part of the Revolutionary Internationalist Movement. China itself has moved sharply away from Maoism since Mao's death, and most people outside of China who describe themselves as Maoist regard the Deng Xiaoping reforms to be a betrayal of Maoism, in line with Mao's view of "capitalist roaders" within the CCP. As the Chinese government instituted market economic reforms starting in the late 1970s and as later Chinese leaders took power, less recognition was given to the status of Mao. This accompanied a decline in state recognition of Mao in later years in contrast to previous years when the state organised numerous events and seminars commemorating Mao's 100th birthday. Nevertheless, the Chinese government has never officially repudiated the tactics of Mao. Deng Xiaoping, who was opposed to the Great Leap Forward and the Cultural Revolution, stated that "when we write about his mistakes we should not exaggerate, for otherwise we shall be discrediting Chairman Mao Zedong and this would mean discrediting our party and state."

The July 1963 Limited Nuclear Test Ban Treaty increased Chinese concerns over a US-Soviet re-alignment against China and prompted Mao's articulation of the "Two Intermediate Zones" concept. Mao viewed Africa and Latin America as the "First Intermediate Zone", in which China's status as a non-white power might enable it to compete with and supersede both American and Soviet influence. The other intermediate zone was the USA's wealthier allies in Europe.

=== Military strategy ===
Mao's military writings continue to have a large amount of influence both among those who seek to create an insurgency and those who seek to crush one, especially in manners of guerrilla warfare, at which Mao is popularly regarded as a genius. The Nepali Maoists were highly influenced by Mao's views on protracted war, new democracy, support of masses, permanency of revolution and the Cultural Revolution. Mao's major contribution to the military science is his theory of people's war, with not only guerrilla warfare but more importantly, Mobile Warfare methodologies. Mao had successfully applied Mobile Warfare in the Korean War, and was able to encircle, push back and then halt the UN forces in Korea, despite the clear superiority of UN firepower.

=== Literature ===
Mao's poems and writings are frequently cited by both Chinese and non-Chinese. The official Chinese translation of President Barack Obama's inauguration speech used a famous line from one of Mao's poems. In the mid-1990s, Mao's picture began to appear on all new renminbi currency from the People's Republic of China. This was officially instituted as an anti-counterfeiting measure as Mao's face is widely recognised in contrast to the generic figures that appear in older currency. On 13 March 2006, the People's Daily reported that a member of the Chinese People's Political Consultative Conference proposed to include the portraits of Sun Yat-sen and Deng Xiaoping in the renminbi.

=== Public image ===
Mao gave contradicting statements on the subject of personality cults. In 1956, as a response to the Khrushchev Report that criticised Joseph Stalin, Mao stated that personality cults are "poisonous ideological survivals of the old society", and reaffirmed China's commitment to collective leadership. At the 1958 party congress in Chengdu, Mao expressed support for the personality cults of people whom he labelled as genuinely worthy figures, not those that expressed "blind worship".

In 1962, Mao proposed the Socialist Education Movement (SEM) in an attempt to educate the peasants to resist the "temptations" of feudalism and the sprouts of capitalism that he saw re-emerging in the countryside from Liu's economic reforms. Large quantities of politicised art were produced and circulated—with Mao at the centre. Numerous posters, badges, and musical compositions referenced Mao in the phrase "Chairman Mao is the red sun in our hearts" (毛主席是我們心中的紅太陽; Máo Zhǔxí Shì Wǒmen Xīnzhōng De Hóng Tàiyáng) and a "Savior of the people" (人民的大救星; Rénmín De Dà Jiùxīng).

In October 1966, Mao's Quotations from Chairman Mao Tse-tung, known as the Little Red Book, was published. Party members were encouraged to carry a copy with them, and possession was almost mandatory as a criterion for membership. Over the years, Mao's image became displayed almost everywhere, present in homes, offices and shops. His quotations were typographically emphasised by putting them in boldface or red type in even the most obscure writings. Music from the period emphasised Mao's stature, as did children's rhymes. The phrase "Long Live Chairman Mao for ten thousand years" was commonly heard during the era.

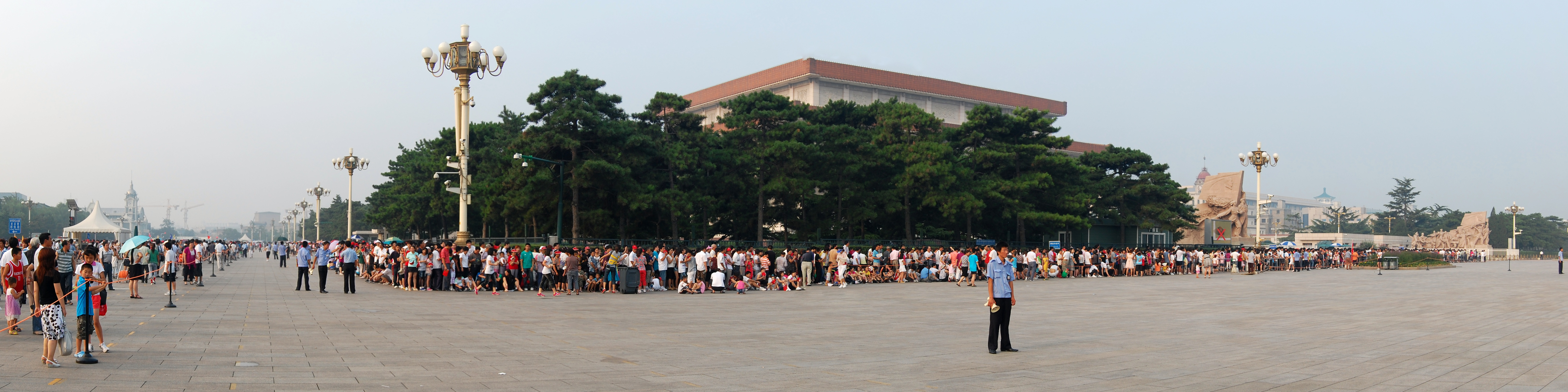
Visitors wait in line to enter the Mao Zedong Mausoleum.

Mao also has a presence in China and around the world in popular culture, where his face adorns everything from T-shirts to coffee cups. Mao's granddaughter, Kong Dongmei, defended the phenomenon, stating that "it shows his influence, that he exists in people's consciousness and has influenced several generations of Chinese people's way of life. Just like Che Guevara's image, his has become a symbol of revolutionary culture." Since 1950, over 40 million people have visited Mao's birthplace in Shaoshan, Hunan.

A 2016 survey by YouGov survey found that 42% of American millennials have never heard of Mao. According to the CIS poll, in 2019 only 21% of Australian millennials were familiar with Mao Zedong. In 2020s China, members of Generation Z are embracing Mao's revolutionary ideas, including violence against the capitalist class, amid rising social inequality, long working hours, and decreasing economic opportunities. As of the early 2020s, surveys conducted on Zhihu frequently rank Mao as one of the greatest and most influential figures in Chinese history.

== Personal life ==
Having grown up in Hunan, Mao spoke Mandarin with a marked Hunanese accent. Ross Terrill wrote Mao was a "son of the soil ... rural and unsophisticated" in origins, while Clare Hollingworth said that Mao was proud of his "peasant ways and manners", having a strong Hunanese accent and providing "earthy" comments on sexual matters. Lee Feigon said that Mao's "earthiness" meant that he remained connected to "everyday Chinese life." Mao was also known to favour chili peppers in his food (a common feature in Hunan cuisine), remarking that "if there are no spicy [peppers], there is no revolution".

Sinologist Stuart R. Schram emphasised Mao's ruthlessness but also noted that he showed no sign of taking pleasure in torture or killing in the revolutionary cause. Lee Feigon considered Mao "draconian and authoritarian" when threatened but opined that he was not the "kind of villain that his mentor Stalin was". Alexander Pantsov and Steven I. Levine wrote that Mao was a "man of complex moods", who "tried his best to bring about prosperity and gain international respect" for China, being "neither a saint nor a demon." They noted that in early life, he strove to be "a strong, wilful, and purposeful hero, not bound by any moral chains", and that he "passionately desired fame and power".

Mao learned to speak some English, particularly through Zhang Hanzhi, his English teacher, interpreter and diplomat who later married Qiao Guanhua, Minister of Foreign Affairs and the head of China's UN delegation. His spoken English was limited to a few single words, phrases, and some short sentences. He first chose to systematically learn English in the 1950s, which was very unusual as the main foreign language first taught in Chinese schools at that time was Russian.

=== Marriages and children ===
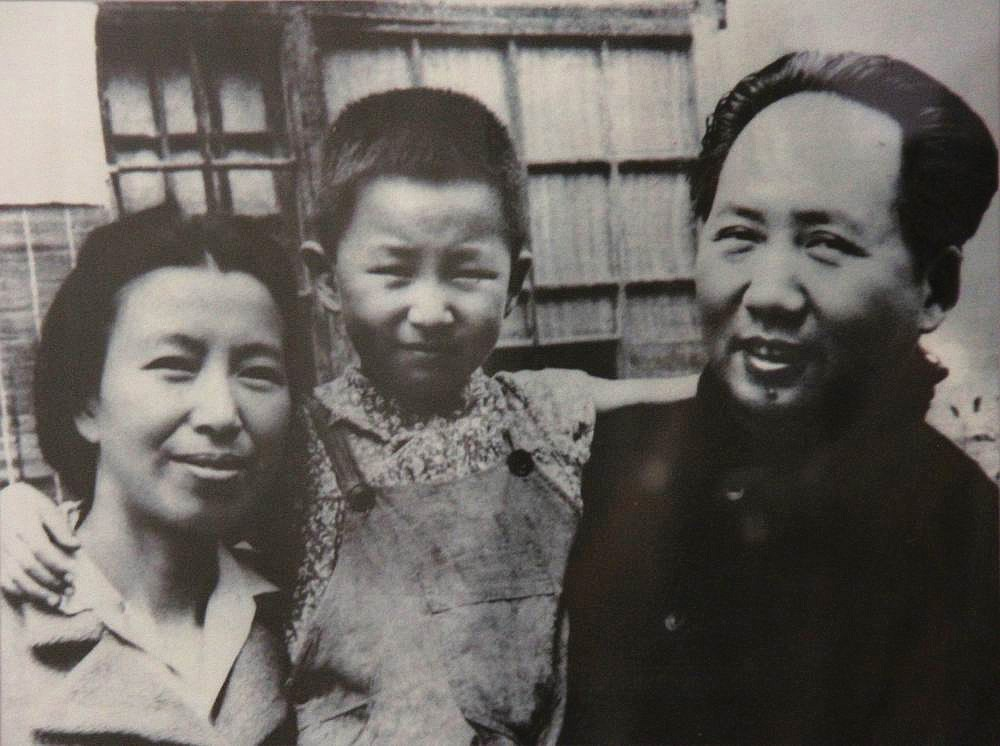
Mao with Jiang Qing and daughter Li Na in the 1940s

Mao had four wives who gave birth to a total of 10 children. His first marriage, to Luo Yixiu (1889–1910), was arranged by their parents; at the time of their wedding, Luo was 18, and Mao was only 14 years old. Luo was the daughter of a Luo Helou, a landowning peasant from Shaoshan who had fallen into poverty. Mao's father had decided to marry off his young son in order to curb his rebellious streak, while Luo's father hoped that his association with the wealthier Mao Yichang would improve his family's fortunes. The two families lived relatively nearby each other, and Luo Yixiu's mother was a distant great-aunt of Mao Zedong.

Mao's second wife was Yang Kaihui (1901–1930). She was born in Bancang, also in China's Hunan province. Her father, Yang Changji, taught Mao at the Hunan First Normal University in Changsha, where the two men became close.

Mao's third wife, He Zizhen (1910–1984), also came from a poor peasant family, but she and her siblings had come to the Communist Party on their own. She became a guerrilla and met Mao in 1928 when he and his forces had retreated to Jinggangshan, and the two began a relationship.

Jiang Qing (1914–1991) was born Li Shumeng in Zhucheng and fled an abusive home to become a successful actress in Shanghai. She was married twice before meeting Mao. Her first marriage in 1931 to Pei Minglun, the son of a Shanghainese businessman, was short-lived. Her second marriage was to the actor Tang Na, but it collapsed after she was repeatedly unfaithful to him.

Mao had two brothers, Mao Zemin and Mao Zetan, and his father adopted his cousin, Mao Zejian. All three joined the Communist Party and were eventually killed by the KMT. Mao Zemin's son Mao Yuanxin was raised by Mao Zedong's family, and he became Mao Zedong's liaison with the Politburo in 1975.

== Writings and calligraphy ==
鷹擊長空，
魚翔淺底，
萬類霜天競自由。
悵寥廓，
問蒼茫大地，
誰主沉浮

Eagles cleave the air,
Fish glide in the limpid deep;
Under freezing skies a million creatures contend in freedom.
Brooding over this immensity,
I ask, on this boundless land
Who rules over man's destiny?

— Excerpt from Mao's poem "Changsha", September 1927

Mao was a prolific writer of political and philosophical literature. The main repository of his pre-1949 writings is the Selected Works of Mao Zedong. A fifth volume, which brought the timeline up to 1957, was briefly issued, but subsequently withdrawn from circulation for its perceived ideological errors. There has never been an official "Complete Works of Mao Zedong". Mao is the attributed author of Quotations from Chairman Mao Tse-tung, known in the West as the "Little Red Book" and in Cultural Revolution China as the "Red Treasure Book" (紅寶書). First published in January 1964, this is a collection of short extracts from his many speeches and articles (most found in the Selected Works), edited by Lin Biao, and ordered topically. The Little Red Book contains some of Mao's most widely known quotes. (Note: Among them are: War is the highest form of struggle for resolving contradictions, when they have developed to a certain stage, between classes, nations, states, or political groups, and it has existed ever since the emergence of private property and of classes. — "Problems of Strategy in China's Revolutionary War" (December 1936), Selected Works of Mao Tse-tung, I, p. 180. Every communist must grasp the truth, 'Political power grows out of the barrel of a gun.'" — 1938, Selected Works of Mao Tse-tung, II, pp. 224–225. Taken as a whole, the Chinese revolutionary movement led by the Communist Party embraces two stages, i.e., the democratic and the socialist revolutions, which are two essentially different revolutionary processes, and the second process can be carried through only after the first has been completed. The democratic revolution is the necessary preparation for the socialist revolution, and the socialist revolution is the inevitable sequel to the democratic revolution. The ultimate aim for which all communists strive is to bring about a socialist and communist society." — "The Chinese Revolution and the Chinese Communist Party" (December 1939), Selected Works of Mao Tse-tung, 'II, pp. 330–331. All reactionaries are paper tigers. In appearance, the reactionaries are terrifying, but in reality they are not so powerful. From a long-term point of view, it is not the reactionaries but the people who are really powerful. — Mao Zedong (July 1956), "U.S. Imperialism Is a Paper Tiger".)

Mao wrote prolifically on political strategy, commentary, and philosophy both before and after he assumed power. (Note: The most influential of these include: Report on an Investigation of the Peasant Movement in Hunan (《湖南农民运动考察报告》); March 1927; On Guerrilla Warfare (《游擊戰》); 1937; On Practice (《實踐論》); 1937; On Contradiction (《矛盾論》); 1937; On Protracted War (《論持久戰》); 1938; In Memory of Norman Bethune (《紀念白求恩》); 1939; On New Democracy (《新民主主義論》); 1940; Talks at the Yan'an Forum on Literature and Art (《在延安文藝座談會上的講話》); 1942; Serve the People (《為人民服務》); 1944; The Foolish Old Man Who Removed the Mountains (《愚公移山》); 1945; On the Correct Handling of the Contradictions Among the People (《正確處理人民內部矛盾問題》); 1957) Mao was also a skilled Chinese calligrapher with a highly personal style. His calligraphy can be seen today throughout mainland China. His work gave rise to a new form of Chinese calligraphy called "Mao-style" or Maoti, which has gained increasing popularity since his death. There exist various competitions specialising in Mao-style calligraphy.

=== Literary works ===
Mao's education began with Chinese classical literature. Mao told Edgar Snow in 1936 that he had started the study of the Confucian Analects and the Four Books at a village school when he was eight, but that the books he most enjoyed reading were Water Margin, Journey to the West, the Romance of the Three Kingdoms and Dream of the Red Chamber. Mao published poems in classical forms starting in his youth and his abilities as a poet contributed to his image in China after he came to power in 1949. His style was influenced by the great Tang dynasty poets Li Bai and Li He.

Some of his best known poems are "Changsha" (1925), "The Double Ninth" (October 1929), "Loushan Pass" (1935), "The Long March" (1935), "Snow" (February 1936), "The PLA Captures Nanjing" (1949), "Reply to Li Shuyi" (11 May 1957), and "Ode to the Plum Blossom" (December 1961).

== Portrayal in media ==
Mao has been portrayed in film and television numerous times. Some notable actors include: Han Shi, the first actor ever to have portrayed Mao, in a 1978 drama Dielianhua and later again in a 1980 film Cross the Dadu River; Gu Yue, who had portrayed Mao 84 times on screen throughout his 27-year career and had won the Best Actor title at the Hundred Flowers Awards in 1990 and 1993; Liu Ye, who played a young Mao in The Founding of a Party (2011); Tang Guoqiang, who has frequently portrayed Mao in more recent times, in the films The Long March (1996) and The Founding of a Republic (2009), and the television series Huang Yanpei (2010), among others. Mao is a principal character in American composer John Adams' opera Nixon in China (1987). The Beatles' song "Revolution" refers to Mao in the verse "but if you go carrying pictures of Chairman Mao you ain't going to make it with anyone anyhow..."; John Lennon expressed regret over including these lines in the song in 1972.

== See also ==
- Mao suit
- Bibliography of works by Mao Zedong
- Bibliography of works about Mao Zedong
- Bibliography of Maoism
- Bibliographies of the People's Republic of China

== Bibliography ==
- Carter, Peter (1976). Mao. London: Oxford University Press. ISBN 978-0192731401.
- Clisson, Tim (2014). Chinese Rules: Mao's Dog, Deng's Cat, and Five Timeless Lessons from the Front Lines in China. New York: Harper. ISBN 978-0062316578.
- Feigon, Lee (2002). Mao: A Reinterpretation. Chicago: Ivan R. Dee. ISBN 978-1566634588.
- Gao, Mobo (2008). The Battle for China's Past: Mao and the Cultural Revolution. London: Pluto Press. ISBN 978-0745327808.
- Hollingworth, Clare (1985). Mao and the Men Against Him. London: Jonathan Cape. ISBN 978-0224017602.
- Hu, Changming 胡长明; Liu, Shengsheng 刘胜生 (1996). "A Few Historical Facts on Mao Zedong's First Marriage 毛泽东第一次婚姻的若干史实". Research on Mao Zedong Thought 毛泽东思想研究 (in Chinese) (1996.2): 111–114. Archived from the original on 1 May 2021.
- Kuisong, Yang (March 2008). "Reconsidering the Campaign to Suppress Counterrevolutionaries". The China Quarterly. 193 (193): 102–121. doi:10.1017/S0305741008000064. S2CID 154927374.
- Li, Zhisui (1994). The Private Life of Chairman Mao: The Memoirs of Mao's Personal Physician. London: Random House. ISBN 978-0679764434.
- MacFarquhar, Roderick; Schoenhals, Michael (2006). Mao's Last Revolution. Cambridge, MA: Harvard University Press. ISBN 978-0674027480.
- Pantsov, Alexander V.; Levine, Steven I. (2012). Mao: The Real Story. New York and London: Simon & Schuster. ISBN 978-1451654479.
- Schram, Stuart (1966). Mao Tse-Tung. London: Simon & Schuster. ISBN 978-0140208405.
- Short, Philip (2001). Mao: A Life. Owl Books. ISBN 978-0805066388.
- Spence, Jonathan (1999). Mao Zedong. Penguin Lives. New York: Viking Press. ISBN 978-0670886692.
  - Burns, John F. (6 February 2000). "Methods of the Great Leader". The New York Times.
- Terrill, Ross (1980). Mao: A Biography. Simon & Schuster., which is superseded by Terrill, Ross (1999). Mao: A Biography. Stanford University Press. ISBN 0804729212.
- Valentino, Benjamin A. (2004). Final Solutions: Mass Killing and Genocide in the Twentieth Century. Cornell University Press. ISBN 978-0801439650.

Party political offices
Preceded by Zhang Guotao	Head of the Organization Department of the Chinese Communist Party; 1924–1925	Succeeded by Chen Duxiu
Preceded by Wang Jingwei	Head of the Kuomintang Propaganda Department; 1925–1926	Succeeded by Ku Meng-yu
Preceded by Lu Yi	Head of the CCP Central Military Commission General Political Department; 1931	Succeeded by Zhou Yili
Preceded by Zhu De	Chairman of the CCP Central Military Commission; 1936–1949	Succeeded by Himself as Chairman of the PRC People's Revolutionary Military Council
Preceded by Deng Fa	President of the Central Party School; 1943–1947	Succeeded by Liu Shaoqi
Preceded by Zhang Wentian as General Secretary	Chairman of the Politburo of the Chinese Communist Party; 1943–1945	Post merged with the Chairman of the Central Committee
Preceded by Zhang Wentian as General Secretary	Chairman of the Central Committee of the Chinese Communist Party; 1945–1976	Succeeded by Hua Guofeng
Preceded by Himself as Chairman of the PRC People's Revolutionary Military Council	Chairman of the CCP Central Military Commission; 1954–1976	Succeeded by Hua Guofeng

Political offices
Chinese Soviet Republic
New title	Chairman of the Central Executive Committee of the Chinese Soviet Republic; 1931–1937	Chinese Soviet Republic disbanded
New title	Chairman of the Council of People's Commissars of the Chinese Soviet Republic; 1931–1934	Succeeded by Zhang Wentian
People's Republic of China
New title	Chairman of the National Committee of the Chinese People's Political Consultative Conference; 1949–1954	Succeeded by Zhou Enlai
New title	Chairman of the Central People's Government of the People's Republic of China; 1949–1954	Succeeded by Himself as Chairman of the People's Republic of China
New title	Chairman of the People's Revolutionary Military Council of the Central People's Government; 1949–1954	Succeeded by Himself as Chairman of the National Defence Commission in the capacity as President of the PRC
Preceded by Himself as Chairman of the Central People's Government	President of China; 1954–1959	Succeeded by Liu Shaoqi
