= 1930 in China =

- Decades: 1910s; 1920s; 1930s; 1940s; 1950s
- See also: Other events of 1930; History of China • Timeline • Years

Events from the year 1930 in China.

== Incumbents ==
- Chairman of the Nationalist government: Chiang Kai-shek
- Premier:
  - until 22 September: Tan Yankai
  - 25 September – 4 December: T.V. Soong
  - starting 4 December: Chiang Kai-shek
- Vice Premier: Feng Yuxiang until 11 October, T.V. Soong

== Events ==
- 29 January – 24 March — Encirclement Campaign against Hunan–Jiangxi Soviet
- 2 March — The League of the Left-Wing Writers was established in Shanghai, at the instigation of the Chinese Communist Party and the influence of the celebrated author Lu Xun.
- May – 4 November — Central Plains War
- 6 May — China signed tariff treaties with Japan. The Republic of China government obtained itself right of tariff autonomy. Some Japanese goods do not need to pay tariffs.
- 27 October – 1 December — Musha Incident in Taiwan.
- December — Futian incident

== Births ==
=== January ===
- 1 January — Sihung Lung, Taiwanese actor of Manchu descent (d. 2002)
- 19 January — Li Daozeng, architect (d. 2020)
- 22 January — Yu Ying-shih, Chinese-born American historian and sinologist (d. 2021)

=== March ===
- 2 March — Liu Siqi, wife of Mao Anying, eldest son of Mao Zedong (d. 2022)
- 26 March — Song Wencong, aerospace engineer and aircraft designer (d. 2016)

=== April ===
- 6 April — Qiu Dahong, engineer (d. 2025)
- 15 April — Zhu Xu, actor (d. 2018)
- Jiang Chunyun, Vice Premier of China (d. 2021)
- Liang Jun, first female tractor driver in Communist China who later became a folk hero and model worker (d. 2020)

=== May ===
- 9 May — Yan Su, playwright and lyricist (d. 2016)
- 21 May — Wang Yingluo, academic in management science and management engineering (d. 2023)
- 24 May — Han Zhenxiang, electrical engineer (d. 2024)

=== June ===
- 10 June — Chen Xitong, 8th Secretary of the Beijing Municipal Committee of the Chinese Communist Party (d. 2013)
- 13 June — Li Zehou, philosopher (d. 2021)

=== July ===
- 1 July — Hu Ping, 10th Governor of Fujian (d. 2020)
- 3 July — Ku Feng, Hong Kong actor
- 8 July — Lu Shibi, orthopedist (d. 2020)

=== September ===
- 3 September — Cho-yun Hsu, Taiwanese historian
- 7 September — Yuan Longping, agronomist and inventor (d. 2021)

=== October ===
- 14 October — Pan Junhua, applied optics engineer (d. 2023)
- 26 October — Sun Yueh, Taiwanese actor (d. 2018)
- Zhu Senlin, 13th Governor of Guangdong

=== November ===
- 20 November — Bai Hua, novelist, playwright and poet (d. 2019)
- 22 November — Li Yining, economist (d. 2023)

=== December ===
- 30 December — Tu Youyou, pharmaceutical chemist

=== Dates unknown ===
  - Hua Sanchuan, painter and illustrator (d. 2004)
  - Liu Hongru, government official (d. 2025)
  - Wan Shaofen, politician (d. 2026)
  - Wu Yanxia, tai chi teacher (d. 2001)

== Deaths ==
- 24 February
  - Wang Zuo, former bandit chieftain who operated in the Jinggang Mountains of Jiangxi (b. 1898)
  - Yuan Wencai, bandit chieftain who operated in the Jinggang Mountains of Jiangxi (b. 1898)
- 1 June — Wang Shizhen, 8th Premier of the Republic of China (b. 1861)
- 21 July — Wang Zhixiang, politician (b. 1858)
- 27 July — Chen Delin, actor and singer of both Peking and Kun opera (b. 1862)
- 17 August — Joseph Charignon, Franco-Chinese engineer (b. 1872)
- 22 September — Tan Yankai, 1st Chairman of the National Government of China (b. 1880)
- 14 September — Lin Baoyi, admiral in the Republic of China Navy (b. 1864)
- 14 November — Yang Kaihui, second wife of Mao Zedong (b. 1901)

== See also ==
- List of Chinese films of the 1930s
