= Bailu =

Bailu may refer to:

- Bailu (solar term) (白露), the 15th solar term of the traditional East Asian calendars

== Places in China ==
=== Subdistricts ===
- Bailu Subdistrict, Liuzhou (白露街道), in Liubei District, Liuzhou, Guangxi
- Bailu Subdistrict, Yingtan (白露街道), in Yuehu District, Yingtan, Jiangxi

=== Towns ===
- Bailu, Chongqing (白鹿), in Wuxi County, Chongqing
- Bailu, Jiangsu (百禄), in Guannan County, Jiangsu
- Bailu, Lushan (白鹿), in Lushan, Jiangxi
- Bailu, Hejiang County (白鹿), in Hejiang County, Sichuan
- Bailu, Pengzhou (白鹿), in Pengzhou, Sichuan
- Bailu, Yunnan (白路), in Wuding County, Yunnan

=== Townships ===
- Bailu Township, Gansu (白碌乡), in Dingxi, Gansu
- Bailu Township, Chongren County (白路乡), in Chongren County, Jiangxi
- Bailu Township, Ganzhou (白鹭乡), in Ganzhou, Jiangxi
- Bailu Township, Jinggangshan (柏露乡), in Jinggangshan, Jiangxi

== See also ==
- Bailu Park (白鹿公园), a park in Chaoyang District, Beijing
- List of storms named Bailu
- Bai Lu (disambiguation)
