= Delin =

Delin is a surname of varied origin. Notable people with the surname include:

- Albert Delin (1712–1771), harpsichord maker in the Low Countries
- Chen Delin (1862–1930), Chinese opera actor and singer
- Diane Delin, American jazz musician and educator
- Judy Delin, British linguist
- Li Delin, ancient Chinese official
- Sun Delin (born 2001), American soccer player
- Wang Delin (1875–1938), Chinese National Salvation Army leader
- Zhang Delin (born 1939), Chinese politician
