= Wang Zuo =

Chinese communist

Wang Zuo (Chinese: 王佐; pinyin: Wáng Zuǒ; May 1898 – February 24, 1930), also Wang Yunhui (王雲輝) or Wang Yunfei (王雲飛), nicknamed Nandougu (南斗牯), was a former bandit chieftain who operated in the Jinggang Mountains of Jiangxi, from 1923, and then joined the Chinese Communist Party, becoming a protégé of Mao Zedong during their formative period in the Jiangxi Soviet. However, this cost him his own life in the following power struggle within the Chinese Communist Party.

== Early life ==
Wang Zuo was born in a Hakka village in Suichuan County, Jiangxi just south of Jinggangshan City. Wang's family was poor and his father died when he was young. The family did not have enough money for the burial, and as a result, lost the tiny piece of land they had to a local landlord who provided the money in the form of usury. Wang Zuo had to work as cowherd and gathering firewoods for the very landlord who provided usury. At the age of 15, Wang Zuo became a tailor by trade, and it was during this time he became a student of a famous local kung fu master, Wang Dongwen (王冬文), and became an expert in martial arts. Witnessing the hopeless struggle of local peasantry via legal means in the reign of corrupted Beiyang warlords, the disillusioned Wang Zuo joined the "Green Forest" (綠林) bandits commanded By Zhu Longzi (朱聋子) in 1923 and rose in ranks, though his contact with bandits could be as early as in 1921 via his kung fu master, Wang Dongwen. Wang was liked by everyone in the gang and soon supplanted the gang's leader, Zhu Kongyang (朱孔陽).

In 1924, Wang Zuo became independent and formed his own gangs, which occupied the village of Dajing, which controlled the passes up Mount Jinggangshan, as their stronghold. Wang himself commandeered the large house of a former landlord as his own. He was recognised as superior by smaller bandit groups and came to be known locally as the "Great King of the Mountain" (山大王). Around 1924, the "Horse and Sword Brigade", formerly subordinate to Wang, came under the independent leadership of Yuan Wencai. In 1925, Wang's subordinate staged a coup and Wang was forced to flee to Yuan, who helped him to reestablish himself. Wang and Yuan became sworn brothers and their two groups maintained close ties and cooperated to defend against the county authorities, with Yuan's force was stationed at the foothills at Maoping, while Wang's force was stationed in the mountains at higher elevation at Greater and Lesser Five Wells (Daxiaowujing 大小五井). Wang Zuo eventually developed the reputation of a local Robin Hood. A peasant song from the 1920s celebrates his deeds:

Nandougu, a tiger sitting in the mountain,
Beating the landlord, helping the poor.
Famed in the mountains and on the plains,
As a king on the mountain eating the wealthy.

However, Wang Zuo gained most of his fame for his martial arts expertise in an ambush: once the unarmed Wang was along in a yard of a landlord and was suddenly besieged by more than a dozen members of landlord's militia in the pre-planned ambush. Grabbing a bench as a weapon, Wang knocked out the landlord's militia members who were closest to him and jumped onto the roof from the ground, and safely escaped without any injury. Experience like this elevated Wang's status among the local populace.

== Early communist era ==
Under the influence of Yuan Wencai, Wang Zuo came into contact with the local Communists in Suichuan (遂川) county around 1925, and his group were recognized as a peasant self-defence force in 1926. After the April 12 Incident, Wang Zuo, like Yuan Wencai, decided to stay with communist side, and became the only two surviving communist forces locally, each had around sixty rifles respectively. Both Yuan and Wang adopted new strategies when they resumed their banditry activities for survival in that they had only targeted the richest landlords and merchants who were mostly hated by the general population. In doing so, they had managed not only to win the support of lower and lower-middle classes, but also that of many members of the middle class such as small business owners. Consequently, this successful practice also became the source of their crimes they were accused of in their subsequent downfall, when their future comrades accused them for being "Not carrying out the revolution completely" and "Being rightist".

Due to the popular support from those with better economic status, the communists were able to secure a steady supply of provisions needed via trade, and helped with properties confiscated from the richest local strongmen, the communists became bolder and concentrated on guerrilla warfare against local governmental forces which were incapable of exterminating Yuan's and Wang's forces due to the strong popular support the communists enjoyed. However, Wang and his men had heavier influence of banditry than Yuan and his men, and although Wang enjoyed almost exclusive popular support of lower class like Yuan, his popular support from the middle class was not as great as that of Yuan Wencai. Because of this and his location deep in the mountains, Wang Zuo and his men were not as active as Yuan Wencai and his men in their guerrilla warfare against the local nationalist government. Nonetheless, in July 1927, under the order of communists, Yuan's men and Wang's men raided Yongxin (永新) county, freeing over 80 Chinese Communist Party (CCP) agents held in the local jail converted from a gaol. Although the town was briefly occupied, it was obvious that it was impossible for the token communist force to hold the town and thus they soon withdrew to the mountains to continue their guerrilla warfare.

== Joining Mao Zedong ==
On September 30, 1927, Mao Zedong arrived at Sanwan (三湾) village of Yongxin (永新) county, just north of Jinggangshan, with the remnants from the abortive Autumn Harvest Uprising, and sent letters to both Yuan Wencai and Wang Zuo to ask their help to establish a communist base locally. On October 3, 1927, Mao's force reached the town of Ninggang (宁冈) and held a conference, at which Mao personally vetoed the suggestion to eliminate Yuan and Wang by force, and quickly established an alliance with Yuan Wencai. Wang Zuo actively seek to establish contact with Mao and in the late October, 1927, he successfully did so. With the help of Yuan Wencai, Wang met Mao Zedong at the village of Greater Well (Dajing, 大井) on October 24, 1927. Wang Zuo was initially somewhat wary, but as with Yuan, Mao approached Wang with a large gift of seventy rifles and horse saddles, and the offer of Communist instructors to give his force military training, thus successfully convinced Wang to welcome him into Wang's base at Ciping (茨坪) on October 27, 1927. Wang provided Mao's men with 25 tons of rice and huge amount of money soon afterward. Mao Zedong sent only one cadre, He Changgong (何长工) to assist Wang Zuo as the trainer and CCP representative, and He Changgong (何长工) helped him defeat a landlord militia unit headed by Yin Daoyi (尹道一), which had been harassing his men, he was won over. As winter approached, Mao withdrew from his forward base of Maoping to defend Jinggangshan from Dajing.

In February 1928, the forces of Yuan Wencai and Wang Zuo were officially incorporated into the regular communist army as the 1st Army, 1st Division, 2nd Regiment. Yuan was named as the regimental commander, and Wang as the deputy regimental commander, with He Changgong as the CCP representative (何长工). On February 17, they participated in a successful attack at Xincheng on a battalion of the Kuomintang's Jiangxi Army, killing the enemy commander and taking more than a hundred prisoners. Wang Zuo joined the CCP in April 1928. However, it must be said for Wang Zuo, it was more accurate to say he joined Mao Zedong's clique than the CCP, since his loyalty was mostly to Mao personally, instead of to the CCP, which eventually caused his downfall and final death when Mao lost the power struggle with Li Lisan and Xiang Zhongfa.

Soon afterwards, Wang accompanied Mao Zedong to Lingxian county in southern Hunan province in aid of Zhu De. Jinggangshan had meanwhile been overrun by landlord militia and had to be reconquered. After Zhu De's soldiers joined the Jinggangshan base, they were merged with the existing forces to become the Fourth "Red Army". Yuan and Wang's 2nd Regiment was renamed the 32nd Regiment. Later in the year, Zhu De's 28th and 29th regiments crossed into Hunan. The 32nd Regiment was given the assignment of securing Maoping from the advance of the Kuomintang's Jiangxi units until his return.

In January 1929, the bulk of the Red Army left Jinggangshan to establish a new base at Ruijin, leaving around 800 ex-Kuomintang troops under Peng Dehuai. Just after the New Year, it was agreed that Peng's men and the 32nd Regiment of Wang Zuo and Yuan Wencai should stay behind to defend Jinggangshan. Under intense pressure for about a week, Peng gathered together his three surviving companies and broke through the enemy blockade with heavy casualties. For the next year Yuan Wencai and Wang Zuo survived with their men in the mountains and may have returned to banditry in their guerrilla warfare. The Kuomintang's repeated mop up operations against them proved to be futile because the communist forces only confiscated property from wealthy landlords, and distributing to peasants. As a result, such banditry was viewed positively by the local general populace, which refused to corporate with the Kuomintang forces.

== Prelude to downfall ==
Jinggangshan and Jiangxi Soviet were not immune to the power struggles within the CCP in the early 1930s. Xiang Zhongfa and Li Lisan succeeded in rising to power under the direction and support of the Comintern and their extreme leftist policy inevitably effected all communist bases in China, including Jinggangshan. The extreme leftism of the new communist leadership included what Mao Zedong called military adventurism, which included attempts to take over the large cities, a result of unrealistic optimism on the Chinese Communist Revolution and a direct copy of the Soviet model of urban revolution.

The new strategy was obvious unfit for China at the time, and many commanders such as Peng Dehuai, Zhu De and Chen Yi voiced their opposition, Wang Zuo and Yuan Wencai included, but it was useless because the new leadership refused to change its policy. As a result, the communist forces met disastrous defeats in attempts to carry out this unrealistic policy. Mao Zedong strongly opposed the military adventurism of Xiang Zhongfa and Li Lisan, but lost and was temporarily forced out of the communist leadership and sent to southern Jiangxi. Although Mao's new position appeared to have the equal rank, in reality Mao was demoted. Furthermore, during the 6th National Congress of the Chinese Communist Party held from June to July 1928 in Moscow, the top brass of communists passed the resolution on the "Organizational Problems of Soviet Government" (关于苏维埃政权组织问题决议案), in which it clearly stated that the bandits could only be utilized before the success of uprising, but afterward, they must be eliminated. This resolution had provided excellent ammo for Li Lisan and Xiang Zhongfa in their power struggle against Mao, and people like Yuan Wencai and Wang Zuo were obviously targets.

However, the political struggle did not end at the top leadership of the communists. In contrast to the professional soldier Peng Dehuai who faithfully attempted to carry out the impossible missions by dutifully obeying the orders despite his personal opposition, which ended in obvious defeats, Wang Zuo and Yuan Wencai not only voiced their opposition in words, but also carried it out in action by simply refusing to obey the unrealistic orders from the new CCP leadership and continued to practice Mao Zedong's strategy. The result of their actions was the obvious success that enabled Wang Zuo and Yuan Wencai to have most of their force preserved. However, the relative success of Wang Zuo and Yuan Wencai not only proved to be useless in helping them within the CCP, but it also served as a catalyst of their downfall because their success of preserving their own forces was viewed as an urgent threat by the new communist leadership, since with greater military force, it was more difficult to remove them politically. With their primary supporter and protector Mao Zedong falling out from power, Wang Zuo's and Yuan Wencai's days were numbered.

When the resolution from the communist 6th National Conference held in the mid-1928 in Moscow reached the communist base in Jinggangshan, it was already winter. In the beginning of 1929, Mao held the Bailu (柏露) Conference to discuss the issue. Wang Huai (王怀), the Chinese Communist Party Committee Secretary of Yongxin (永新) county and You Chaoqing (尤超清), the CCP committee secretary of Ninggang (宁冈) county, who had been at odds with Yuan and Wang insisted on executing Yuan and Wang according to the resolution but their suggestion was once again vetoed by Mao. The resulting decision was a compromise that Wang would remain to command forces in the communist base, while Yuan would be named as the chief-of-staff and deployed with the communist force striking southern Jiangxi.

== Death ==
In the late night of February 23, 1930, Peng Dehuai was awakened from his bed by Xiang Zhongfa's and Li Lisan's two lieutenants, the local CCP committee secretaries Zhu Changxie (朱昌偕) and Wang Huai (王怀), who told Peng that they had just received intelligence claiming Wang Zuo and Yuan Wencai had defected to Kuomintang, and thus they need Peng's signature to deploy troops to exterminate the traitors. Ironically, one of the supporters of Zhu Changxie (朱昌偕) and Wang Huai (王怀), You Chaoqing (尤超清), was the one who introduced Wang and Yuan to the communists. Knowing both Wang and Yuan would not do such thing, Peng initially refused and argued with them to defend Wang and Yuan. The three lieutenants of Xiang Zhongfa and Li Lisan then changed their story by claiming that the intelligence indeed appeared to be a rumor, and they were to be invited to a meeting to clear things up, some force would be deployed just in case. Sensing Peng Dehuai's opposition, the three also asked Peng not to be involved by staying where he was instead of going to the planned meeting, for the sake of not to agitate situation. This tactic finally convinced Peng Dehuai who give his signature, and the three men led over 300 troops away to plot their next move.

After leaving Peng Dehuai's camp, the three immediately faked Mao Zedong's order to lure both Yuan and Wang to the supposed meeting to discuss the military situation. But once Wang Zuo and Yuan Wencai reached the meeting, they were shot in obscure circumstances, allegedly ambushed while trying to rebel. Wang managed to escape out a window but drowned while attempting to cross a river.

== Legacy ==
As early as October of that year, Mao Zedong criticised the officials in power of the Jiangxi Soviet for the assassination of his old allies. Just who gave the order for the death of Wang Zuo, however, is still not clear, although a number of officials of the Jiangxi CCP were implicated. Wang Yunlong (王雲隆), Wang Zuo's younger brother and an officer of the 32nd Regiment, became the new leader of his brother's men, and defected to Kuomintang. After Wang Yunlong (王雲隆)'s death, Wang Zuo's son became the leader and it was not until nearly two decades later in 1949 when the communists were finally able to retake Jinggangshan.

After 1949, both Yuan and Wang were marked as examples of ideologically reformed bandits who had been transformed into Communist soldiers. Both were recognised as martyrs of the Chinese Communist Revolution. In 1951 Wang's grave was moved to Dajing, where a monument was erected in his honour. Although Peng Dehuai was not directly involved in the death of Yuan Wencai and Wang Zuo, as proved by the history, that did not prevent Mao Zedong from blaming it on Peng, and Peng Dehuai was persecuted 30 years later, the death of Wang Zuo and Yuan Wencai was one of the alleged crime Peng committed against Mao, and this alleged crime again appeared during the Cultural Revolution when Peng Dehuai was struggled by the Red Guards.
