= Yuan Wencai =

Chinese bandit chieftain

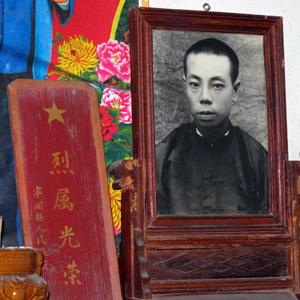
Portrait of Yuan Wencai, later rehabilitated and granted "Glorious Martyr" status by the government

Yuan Wencai (Chinese: 袁文才; pinyin: Yuán Wéncái), also Yuan Xuansan (simplified Chinese: 袁选三; traditional Chinese: 袁選三; pinyin: Yuán Xuǎnsān) was a former bandit chieftain who operated in the Jinggang Mountains of Jiangxi, from 1923, and then joined the Chinese Communist Party, becoming a protégé of Mao Zedong during their formative period in the Jiangxi Soviet. However, it cost his own life in the following power struggle within the Chinese Communist Party.

== Early life ==
Yuan was born into a Hakka family in Maoping Township, Jinggangshan City, Jiangxi, at the foothills of the Luoxian Mountains, in October, 1898. After graduating from a private elementary school, he dropped out of a local public middle school when his father abruptly died in 1920, leaving the family destitute. Being one of the extremely few peasants who received some education, he was elected by the local peasants as their representatives in their struggle against the brutal oppression of local landlords. As a result, he was deeply feared and hated by local strongmen such as Xie Guannan (谢冠南). In 1923, Xie Guannan had Yuan Wencai's home ransacked, house burned down, his elder brother imprisoned, his wife raped and then enslaved, while his mother murdered execution style. The local strongmen were able to bribe the corrupted local government and had Yuan Wencai as wanted criminal. This marked the end of Yuan's struggle for welfare of the local peasants in legal means. The young Yuan Wencai, then in his early twenties, fled into the mountains and joined a group of brigands calling themselves the "Horse and Sword Brigade" (馬刀隊) headed by Hu Yachun (胡亚春). Yuan Wencai soon proved himself and it was not long before he became the leader of bandits. They operated in the hills of Jinggangshan, particularly around Ningang county, and had close ties with the "Green Forest" (绿林) bandits based on higher terrain, led by Wang Zuo. Yuan Wencai proved to be a better leader than Wang Zuo in that he had managed to win greater support of local peasants, and in 1924, Yuan's band attacked and took the town of Ninggang (宁冈), burned down the governmental administrative building.

The Jiangxi provincial government sent in a battalion to eradicate Yuan's force, but due to the completely lack of support of local population which cheered Yuan's action, not only the campaign had failed to eradicate Yuan's force and resulted in defeat, but also suffered heavy casualties, though a great portion of the casualties suffered by the governmental force was due to illness. The failed governmental attempt increased Yuan's reputation among local peasants. In 1925, Wang Zuo was forced to flee to Yuan Wencai's turf due to a coup staged by his subordinates, and Yuan helped Wang to defeat his opponents and firmly reestablished Wang's position as the chief of the band. The two became sworn brothers and strategically positioned their forces to secure their bases in Jinggangshan. Yuan's force was stationed at the foothills at Maoping, while Wang's force was stationed in the mountains at higher elevation at Greater and Lesser Five Wells (Daxiaowujing 大小五井).

== Early communist years ==
From the summer of 1925, Yuan Wencai began to have contact with representatives of the Chinese Communist Party via the Ninggang (宁冈) communist You Chaoqing (尤超清). In September, 1925, Yuan's force was reorganized as the Ninggang Security Regiment with Yuan as the regimental commander, and this is the first armed force in China that was under the control of Chinese Communist Party. In October 1926, during the Northern Expedition, he organized an attack on Ninggang county, deposed the local county chief Shen Qingyuan (沈清源) of the Beiyang clique of warlords, while seizing weapons and securing the area for the Communists. In November of that year, he became a member of the Communist Party, and his men were reorganized as a peasant self-defence force. After the appointment of a new county chief by the newly established Republican government at Nanjing.

After April 12 Incident, Yuan Wencai, like Wang Zuo, decided to stay with communist side, and became the only two surviving communist forces locally, each had around sixty rifles respectively. Both Yuan and Wang adopted new strategies when they resumed their banditry activities for survival in that they had only targeted the richest landlords and merchants who were mostly hated by the general population. In doing so, they had managed not only to win the support of lower and lower-middle classes, but also that of many members of the middle class such as small business owners. Consequently, this successful practice also became the source of their crimes they were accused of in their subsequent downfall, when their future comrades accused them for being "Not carrying out the revolution completely" and "Being rightist". Due to the popular support from those with better economic status, the communists were able to secure a steady supply of provisions needed via trade, and helped with properties confiscated from the richest local strongmen, the communists became bolder and concentrated on guerrilla warfare against local governmental forces which were incapable of exterminating Yuan's and Wang's forces due to the strong popular support the communists enjoyed. In July, 1927, under the order of communists, Yuan's men and Wang's men raided Yongxin County, freeing over 80 Communist Party agents held in the local jail converted from a jail. Although the town was briefly occupied, it was obvious that it was impossible for the token communist force to hold the town and thus they soon withdrew to the mountains to continue their guerrilla warfare.

== Joining Mao Zedong ==
On September 30, 1927, Mao Zedong arrived at Sanwan (三湾) village of Yongxin (永新) county, just north of Jinggangshan, with the remnants from the abortive Autumn Harvest Uprising, and sent letters to both Yuan Wencai and Wang Zuo to ask their help to establish a communist base locally. On October 3, 1927, Mao's force reached the town of Ninggang (宁冈) and held a conference, at which Mao personally vetoed the suggestion to eliminate Yuan and Wang by force. At first Yuan Wencai was suspicious of Mao and lay an ambush on the mountain road to Ninggang to defend his turf. Accompanied by You Chaoqing (尤超清), Mao went to meet Yuan on October 6, 1927, at Dacang (大仓) village near Maoping (茅坪), and convinced Yuan to join his men. Mao gave more than a hundred rifles to Yuan and in return, Yuan gave over a thousand silver dollars to Mao. The next day, Yuan personally held a ceremony to welcome Mao and his men to Maoping (茅坪). Yuan had his bodyguard Li Genjin (李根勤) accompany Mao to Maoping, where they set up military headquarters. Yuan subsequently helped to gather five tons of grains and a huge amount of cloth to Mao's men, and helped to established the first military hospital in the communist base.

That winter Yuan's men drilled together with the Communists and were further indoctrinated in Marxist political theory, when Mao sent cadres including Xu Yangang (徐彦刚), You Xuecheng (游雪程), and Chen Bojun (陈伯钧) to help Yuan. In February 1928, the forces of Yuan Wencai and Wang Zuo were officially incorporated into the regular Communist army as the 1st Army, 1st Division, 2nd Regiment. Yuan was named as the regimental commander, and Wang as the deputy regimental commander, with He Changgong as the communist party representative (何长工). They participated in a successful attack at Xincheng on a battalion of the Kuomintang's Jiangxi Army, killing the enemy commander and taking more than a hundred prisoners. In the spring of 1928 Yuan Wencai introduced the sister of a classmate, He Zizhen, to Mao Zedong. The couple began living together soon afterwards, much to the delight of Yuan. He cooked them a nuptial supper, apparently hoping that the partnership would commit Mao more strongly to the area's defence.

Soon afterwards, he accompanied Mao Zedong to Lingxian county in southern Hunan province in aid of Zhu De. Jinggangshan had meanwhile been overrun by landlord militia and had to be reconquered. After Zhu De's soldiers joined the Jinggangshan base, they were merged with the existing forces to become the Fourth "Red Army". Yuan and Wang's 2nd Regiment was renamed the 32nd Regiment. Later in the year, Zhu De's 28th and 29th regiments crossed into Hunan. The 32nd Regiment was given the assignment of securing Maoping from the advance of the Kuomintang's Jiangxi units until his return.

In January 1929, the bulk of the Red Army left Jinggangshan to establish a new base at Ruijin, leaving around 800 ex-Kuomintang troops under Peng Dehuai. Just after the New Year, it was agreed that Peng's men and the 32nd Regiment of Wang Zuo and Yuan Wencai should stay behind to defend Jinggangshan. Under intense pressure for about a week, Peng gathered together his three surviving companies and broke through the enemy blockade with heavy casualties. For the next year Yuan Wencai and Wang Zuo survived with their men in the mountains and may have returned to banditry in their guerrilla warfare. The Kuomintang's repeated mop up operations against them proved to be futile because the communist forces only confiscated property from wealthy landlords, and distributing to peasants. As a result, such banditry was viewed positively by the local general populace, which refused to corporate with the Kuomintang forces.

== Prelude to downfall ==
Jinggangshan and Jiangxi Soviet were not immune to the power struggles within the Chinese Communist Party in the early 1930s. Xiang Zhongfa and Li Lisan succeeded in rising to power under the direction and support of the Comintern and their extreme leftist policy inevitably effected all communist bases in China, including Jinggangshan. The extreme leftism of the new communist leadership included what Mao Zedong called military adventurism, which included attempts to take over the large cities, a result of unrealistic optimism on the Chinese Communist Revolution and a direct copy of the Soviet model of urban revolution.

The new strategy was obvious unfit for China at the time, and many commanders such as Peng Dehuai, Zhu De and Chen Yi voiced their opposition, Wang Zuo and Yuan Wencai included, but it was useless because the new leadership refused to change its policy. As a result, the communist forces met disastrous defeats in attempts to carry out this unrealistic policy. Mao Zedong strongly opposed the military adventurism of Xiang Zhongfa and Li Lisan, but lost and was temporarily forced out of the communist leadership and sent to southern Jiangxi. Although Mao's new position appeared to have the equal rank, in reality Mao was demoted, and could not protect Yuan and Wang, and his other protégés as he used to. Furthermore, during the 6th National Conference of Chinese Communist Party held from June to July, 1928 in Moscow, the top brass of communists passed the resolution on the "Organizational Problems of Soviet Government", in which it clearly stated that the bandits could only be utilized before the success of uprising, but afterward, they must be eliminated. This resolution had provided excellent ammo for Li Lisan and Xiang Zhongfa in their power struggle against Mao, and people like Yuan Wencai and Wang Zuo were obviously targets.

However, the political struggle did not end at the top leadership of the communists. In contrast to the professional soldier Peng Dehuai who faithfully attempted to carry out the impossible missions by dutifully obeying the orders despite his personal opposition, which of course ended in obvious defeats, Wang Zuo and Yuan Wencai not only voiced their opposition in words, but also carried it out in action by simply refusing to obey the unrealistic orders from the new communist party leadership and continued to practice Mao Zedong's strategy. The result of their actions was the obvious success that enabled Wang Zuo and Yuan Wencai to have most of their force preserved. However, the relative success of Wang Zuo and Yuan Wencai not only proved to be useless in helping them within the communist party, but it also served as a catalyst of their downfall because their success of preserving their own forces was viewed as an urgent threat by the new communist leadership, since with greater military force, it was more difficult to remove them politically. With their primary supporter and protector Mao Zedong falling out from power, Wang Zuo's and Yuan Wencai's days were numbered.

When the resolution from the communist 6th National Conference held in the mid-1928 in Moscow reached the communist base in Jinggangshan, it was already winter. In the beginning of 1929, Mao held the Bailu (柏露) Conference to discuss the issue. Wang Huai (王怀), the communist party secretary of Yongxin (永新) county and You Chaoqing (尤超清), the communist party secretary of Ninggang (宁冈) county, who had been at odds with Yuan and Wang insisted on executing Yuan and Wang according to the resolution but their suggestion was once again vetoed by Mao. The resulting decision was that Wang would remain to command forces in the communist base, while Yuan would be named as the chief-of-staff and deployed with the communist force striking southern Jiangxi. During campaigns in southern Jiangxi, Yuan accidentally came across the resolution from Moscow at Donggu (东固), and although he feared for his life, he decided to prove himself by returning to the communist base in May, 1929, and he continued his service with communist faithfully, but this did not help.

== Death ==
In the late night of February 23, 1930, Peng Dehuai was awakened from bed by Xiang Zhongfa's and Li Lisan's three lieutenants Zhu Changxie (朱昌偕) and Wang Huai (王怀), who told Peng that they had just received intelligence that claimed Wang Zuo and Yuan Wencai, had defected to Kuomintang, and therefore they need Peng's signature to deploy troops to exterminate the traitors. Ironically, one of the supporters of Zhu Changxie (朱昌偕) and Wang Huai (王怀), You Chaoqing (尤超清), was the one who introduced Wang and Yuan to the communists, and Peng knew full well that neither Wang Zuo and Yuan Wencai would do such thing. Peng initially refused, and argued in defense of Wang and Yuan. The three lieutenants of Xiang Zhongfa and Li Lisan then changed their story, claiming that the intelligence indeed appeared to be a rumor, and that they needed to arrange a meeting with the two commanders to clear things up, and that some forces should be deployed just in case. Sensing Peng Dehuai's opposition, the three also asked Peng not to become involved, to remaining where he was, instead of attending the planned meeting, for the sake of not agitating the situation. This tactic finally convinced Peng Dehuai to give his signature. Subsequently, the three men led over three hundred troops away to plot their next move.

After leaving Peng Dehuai's camp, the three immediately faked Mao Zedong's order to lure both Wang Zuo and Yuan Wencai to the supposed meeting to discuss the military situation. But once Wang Zuo and Yuan Wencai reached the meeting, they were shot in obscure circumstances, allegedly ambushed while trying to rebel. Wang managed to escape out a window but drowned whilst attempting to cross a river.

As early as October of that year, Mao Zedong criticized the officials in power of the Jiangxi Soviet for the assassination of his old allies. Just who gave the order for the death of Wang Zuo, however, is still not clear, although a number of officials of the Jiangxi Communist Party were implicated. Wang Yunlong (王雲隆), Wang Zuo's younger brother and an officer of the 32nd Regiment, became the new leader of his brother's men, and defected to Kuomintang, taking many former Yuan Wencai's men with them. After Wang Yunlong's death, Wang Zuo's son became the leader and it was not until nearly two decades later in 1949 when the communists were finally able to retake Jinggangshan.

After 1949, both Yuan and Wang were marked as examples of ideologically reformed bandits who had been transformed into Communist soldiers. Both were recognised as martyrs of the Chinese Communist Revolution. When Zhu De visited Jinggangshan in 1962 and Mao Zedong in 1965, both called upon Yuan Wencai's elderly widow Xie Meixiang (謝梅香). In 1986, his grave was moved to the newly constructed Jinggangshan Martyrs Cemetery. Although Peng Dehuai was not directly involved in the death of Yuan Wencai and Wang Zuo, as proved by the history, that did not prevent Mao Zedong from blaming the affair on Peng. Peng Dehuai was persecuted thirty years later for the death of Wang Zuo and Yuan Wencai. This was one of the alleged crime Peng committed against Mao, and this alleged crime again appeared during the Cultural Revolution when Peng Dehuai was struggled by the Red Guards.
