= 金田 =

金田, meaning "gold field", may refer to:

- Jintian (disambiguation), the Chinese transliteration
- Kaneda (disambiguation), the Japanese transliteration
