= Yunfei =

Yunfei is a transliteration of multiple Chinese given names. Notable people with these names include:

- Li Yunfei (李运飞, born 1979), Chinese figure skater
- Liu Yunfei (刘云飞, born 1979), Chinese football player
- Yunfei, fictional character in the Samurai Shodown video game series
- Wang Zuo (王佐, 1898–1930), Chinese bandit chieftain and protégé of Mao Zedong, also called Wang Yunfei (王雲飛)
