= Huang Huaqing =

Chinese politician

Huang Huaqing (1915–1969) was a government official from Lu'an County, Anhui Province. During the Second Sino-Japanese War, he was incorporated into the Jin-Cha-Ji Military Region led by Nie Rongzhen. He then served as the Political Commissar of the Ministry of Health Later, he went on to serve as the deputy director of the Harbin Public Security Bureau when Chen Long was the Director. He eventually became the third Director-General and led the investigation that uncovered the "April 22nd" case. He was also the first Chinese Communist Party Committee Secretary of Xi'an Hongqi Machinery Factory, now known as the AVIC Xi'an Aircraft Industry Group.

== Biography ==
=== 1915–1936: Early life, military ===
Huang was born in Dabu Kou Township, South Yue Temple, in 1915. Influenced by his uncles and brothers, he joined the Youth League in 1929 and served as its captain, organizing the Young Pioneers.

In February 1931, Huang joined the Chinese Red Army and was assigned to lead a group of over 10 members to the front to join the 4th Red Army; they were eventually incorporated into the 12th Division. During the Battle of Huang'an in Hubei, Huang and his men were surrounded, after which they jumped off a cliff; Huang broke his back.

In 1933, Huang was assigned to the 82nd Division of the 28th Army as the secretary of the Party Committee.

In 1934, Huang followed the 25th Red Army on the Long March to establish a base in southern Shaanxi.

In the fall of 1935, the 25th Red Army reached the Shaanxi-Ningxia Border Area, after which it merged with the 26th Red Army in northern Shaanxi, thus forming the 15th Red Army Corps. In the same year, Huang became a formal member of the Chinese Communist Party (CCP) in northern Shaanxi.

=== 1936–1947: Chinese Communist Party ===
During the Second Sino-Japanese War, Huang mainly engaged in the CCP's political work in the military and schools. At the Jin-Cha-Ji Military Region Political and Military Cadre School, where Sun Yi had been serving as the principal and political commissar, Huang became the secretary of the Party branch.

In 1937, he worked alongside Wang Zonghuai at the Jin-Cha-Ji Military Region headquarters as a deputy.

Later, in 1940, Huang served as the political commissar of the Health Department of the 8th Route Army's Jin-Cha-Ji Military Region.

In October 1945, Huang followed He Changgong, who led the Counter-Japanese Military and Political University, from Suide to Northeast China.

In 1946, Huang served as the political commissar of the Second Detachment of the General School of the Northeast Military and Political University.

=== 1947–1969: Postwar service ===
In politics, Huang continued to serve in roles like the Party Secretary of the CCP Harbin Special City Garrison Party Affairs Committee, the Political Commissar of the Harbin Special City Law Enforcement Brigade, the Director of the Harbin Special City Public Security General Brigade, and the Director of the Harbin City Reactionary Party and Organization Special Registration Work Committee. In 1958, after being transferred to Xi'an, he served as the Party Secretary of the Xi'an Hongqi Machinery Factory (now AVIC Xi'an Aircraft Industry Group).

In the realm of public security, Huang served as the deputy director and, later, the Director-General of the Harbin Public Security Bureau from 1947 to 1949. He also served as the Director of the Nanchang Public Security Bureau and the Deputy Commander of the Nanchang City Garrison Command. From 1951 to 1953, he served as the First deputy director of the Guangzhou Public Security Bureau and concurrently as the Political Commissar of the Guangzhou Public Security General Brigade.

Huang also served in other areas of public life. In 1952, Huang was elected as a member of the Guangzhou Municipal People's Government. From 1953 to 1956, under the leadership of Ye Jianying, he served as the deputy director of the South China Land Reclamation General Bureau in Guangzhou and the Minister of the Social Department. From 1965 to 1969, he served as the deputy director of the Northwest Branch of the Chinese Academy of Sciences. Huang then died in February 1969.
