= Jintian Park =

Park in Beijing, China

- Type: Urban park, Forest park
- Location: Beijing, China
- Area: 67 hectares (170 acres)
- Created: 2009
- Status: Open all year

Jintian Park (Chinese: 金田公园; lit. 'Golden Field Park') is located in Chaoyang District, Beijing. It is one of the first 15 suburban parks created by the municipal government of Beijing, China. It is an urban forest park and a large botanical garden in the eastern part of Beijing, and it is close to Guta Park and White Deer Park. In the park, species of trees are planted, and meandering creeks and brooks serve as part of the landscape. Species of flowers are chosen so as to allow flowers blooming in three seasons of the year. The park contains four main sections: one for the fall season, an evergreen section, a special botanical section, and a wetland scenic section. The park was constructed in 2008, and open to public in 2009.
