= Châteaudouble =

Châteaudouble is the name of the following communes in France:

- Châteaudouble, Drôme, in the Drôme department
- Châteaudouble, Var, in the Var department
