= Jingtian (disambiguation) =

Jingtian (well-field system) was a Chinese land redistribution method.

Jingtian may also refer to:

== People ==
=== Real people ===
- Ethan Juan (阮經天, Ruan Jingtian), Taiwanese actor and model (born 1982)
- Lei Jingtian (1904–1959), Chinese military personnel
- Yu Jingtian (余景天), Canadian male singer and actor (born 1980)
- Zhang Jingtian (張京天), Chinese professional football player (1935–2020); see 1995 Guangzhou Apollo F.C. season § Reserve team

== Other uses ==
- Ganten (景田; Jyutping: ging2 tin4), a Chinese bottled water brand
- Jingtian Cult (淨天教), a cult in the video game by Softstar Entertainment The Legend of Sword and Fairy
- Jingtian station, a metro station on Line 2 and Line 9 of the Shenzhen Metro

== See also ==
- Chinese given name
- Jing (disambiguation)
- Jing Tian (disambiguation)
- Jingtianlu station
- Jintian (disambiguation)
- Tian (disambiguation)
