= Timeless: The Music of Bob Acri =

Timeless: The Music Of Bob Acri

Studio album by Bob Acri
- Released: October 30, 2001
- Recorded: May 2001
- Studios: Sparrow Sound Design Recording Studio, Chicago IL
- Genre: Jazz
- Length: 56:45
- Label: Southport

Timeless: The Music of Bob Acri is the first studio album by American jazz pianist Bob Acri, released on October 30, 2001, by Southport Records.

== Track list ==
No.	Title	Length
1.	"Tribute to Buddy"	5:35
2.	"Lonley Lonley Girl"	2:13
3.	"R.B. Blues"	5:35
4.	"Sleep Away"	2:56
5.	"Wake Robin"	4:48
6.	"Chromabluze (Solo Piano)"	1:26
7.	"Linda Rose"	5:16
8.	"Guess Who"	3:23
9.	"Lonley Lonley Girl"	4:11
10.	"Bossa Nova Viejo"	8:40
11.	"Fugue"	2:51
12.	"J and B Blues"	3:44
13.	"Bob's Blues"	4:52
14.	"Sleep Away (Solo Piano)"	1:15
Total length:		56:45
