= Bai Lu =

Bai Lu may refer to:

- Bai Lü (born 1961), Chinese general
- Bai Lu (actress) (born 1994), Chinese actress
- Bãi Lữ, a seaside resort in Cửa Lò, Nghệ An Province, Vietnam

== See also ==
- Bailu (disambiguation)
