= Bob Acri =

American jazz pianist

- Undated photo of Acri
- Born: Robert Acri; October 1, 1918; Chicago, Illinois, United States
- Died: July 25, 2013 (aged 94); Evanston, Illinois, United States
- Occupation: Jazz pianist

Robert Acri (October 1, 1918 – July 25, 2013) was an American jazz pianist. Acri graduated from Austin High School in Chicago. While at Austin High, he began his career at the NBC Orchestra on the Dave Garroway Radio Show. He was a classically trained pianist, having studied with Rudolph Ganz and Fred Euing. He also studied composition with Dr. Karel Jirak and Bill Russo. During his career, he played in the radio orchestras of NBC and ABC, as well as in the House Band of the Chicago nightclub Mister Kelly's. He toured with Harry James and accompanied Lena Horne, Mike Douglas, Ella Fitzgerald, Barbra Streisand, Buddy Rich and Woody Herman. He earned his Bachelor of Music and Master of Music degrees from Roosevelt University in his late 70s. He ended his career as the leader of the house band at the Cantina Room of the Continental Plaza Hotel.

Acri released two solo albums of instrumental tracks in 2001 and 2004. "Sleep Away", a composition from his 2004 self-titled album, was selected by Microsoft in 2009 as a sample demo track for Windows 7 to demonstrate the newly released version 12 of Windows Media Player.

== Death ==
Bob Acri died on July 25, 2013, at Evanston Hospital in Evanston, Illinois.

== Discography ==
- 2001: Timeless: The Music Of Bob Acri
- 2004: Sleep Away (with George Mraz, Ed Thigpen, Lew Soloff, Frank Wess and Diane Delin)
