= Great Exchange of Revolutionary Experience =

Cultural Revolution campaign

- Chinese: 全国大串联
- Literal meaning: "Great National Linkup"
Transcriptions
Standard Mandarin
- Hanyu Pinyin: Quánguó dà chuànlián

Alternate Chinese name
- Chinese: 全国大串连
Transcriptions
Standard Mandarin
- Hanyu Pinyin: Quánguó dà chuànlián

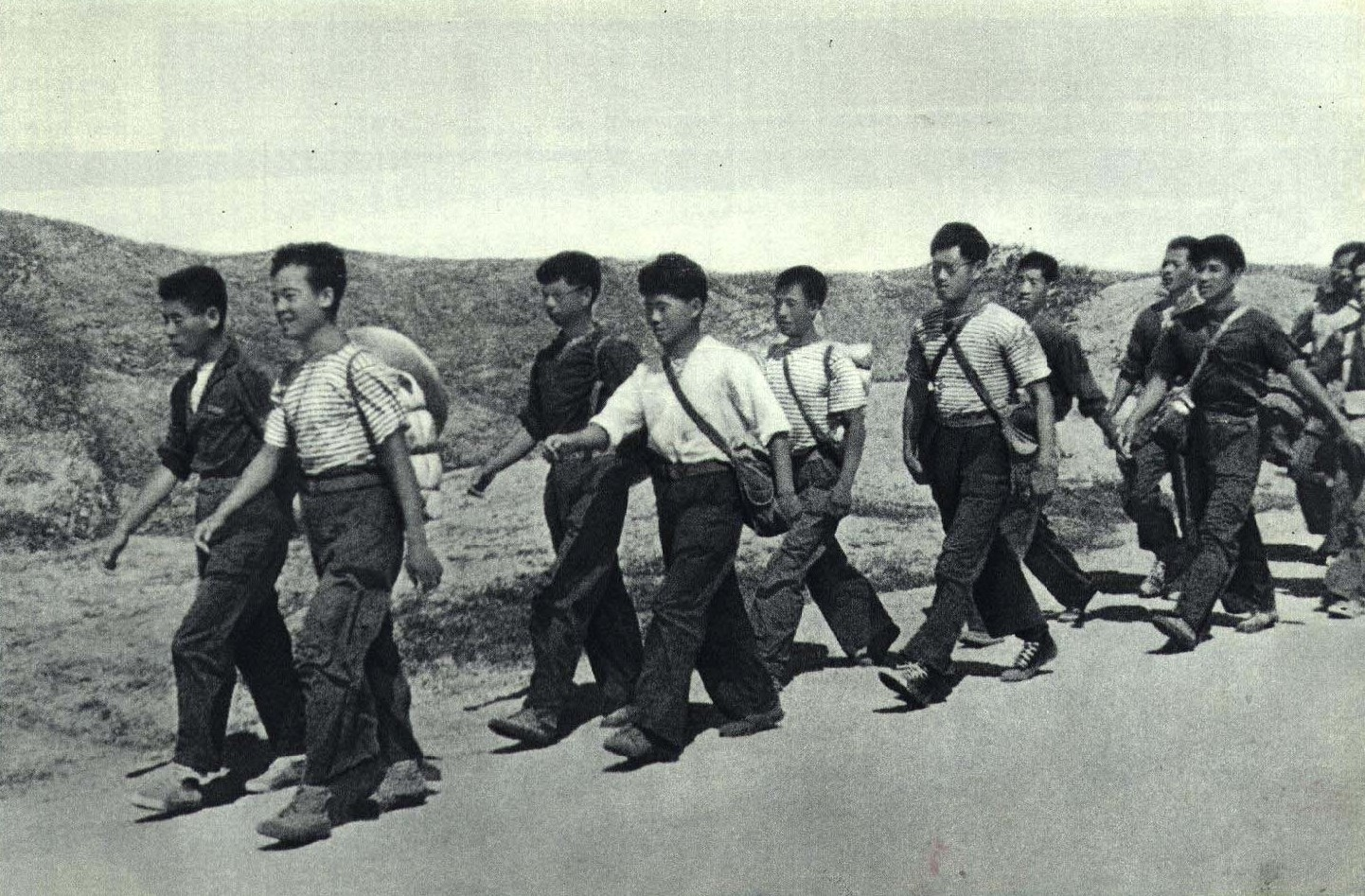
Fifteen Red Guards from Dalian Maritime University imitated the Red Army's Long March by walking from Dalian to Beijing. The People's Daily reported the news in an editorial titled "Red Guards Are Not Afraid of the Long March", praising them for walking 1000 km in a month.

The Great Exchange of Revolutionary Experience, also translated as the Exchange of Revolutionary Experiences, the Big Link-up, or the Great Exchange, was one of the social mobilization measures started by the Chairman of the Chinese Communist Party, Mao Zedong, to launch the Cultural Revolution. From September 1966 to March 1967, Red Guard organizations or individuals, consisting mainly of students, were provided free transportation and free hospitality (food and lodging) throughout the country, so that they could organize, communicate and promote revolutionary activities.

== Origin ==
After Nie Yuanzi's poster criticizing Peking University was broadcast nationwide, an event often considered the opening of the Cultural Revolution, colleges and middle schools took the lead in responding. Rebels rushed to Peking University to learn from others and to the "Central Cultural Revolution Reception Station" to file complaints and seek official help. From July 29 to August 12, 710,000 people from 36,000 units went to Peking University. Mao Zedong's reply to the Red Guards of Tsinghua University High School and the "Sixteen Articles" of the 11th plenary meeting of the 8th Central Committee of the Chinese Communist Party had caused powerful shockwaves, but had not yet broken the attitude of local government leaders who sought to resist and control the Cultural Revolution. On August 18 and August 31, Mao Zedong met twice with crowds of Red Guards, teachers and students in the capital, publicizing his affirmation and support for the Red Guards. His personal authority and charm attracted young students from all over the country who traveled en masse to Beijing, eager to be received by Mao and eager to bring back voices of support from the Central Cultural Revolution Group that differed from local authorities' suppression of the movement.

== Development ==
On September 5, 1966, the CCP Central Committee and State Council issued a notice to organize representatives of students and workers from colleges and secondary schools outside Beijing to visit Beijing and learn about the Cultural Revolution. Transportation and living subsidies were paid for by the state treasury. No tickets were required for bus and boat rides, and meals and accommodation were free of charge. Kent Wong, in a 2021 memoir, recalled that anyone could obtain a free ride by claiming to be a Red Guard, since they had no identity cards and "[no] conductor dared question anyone's Red Guard status".

Many people used the opportunity for red tourism and visited historical revolutionary sites. 1.6 million Red Guards had passed through Guangzhou by the end of 1966, where Mao had lectured at the Peasant Movement Training Institute twenty years earlier. Ofﬁcial post–Cultural Revolutionary histories note that about 1000 Red Guards from China proper (Sichuan and Beijing) even managed to enter distant Tibet. Tibetan visitors stopped arriving by mid-November 1966, partly because of difficulties caused by the oncoming winter and partly because of a new policy discouraging Han students from traveling to ethnic minority areas.

Dormitories in all schools, government agencies and factories were vacated to set up reception stations. At the same time, students from all over the country traveled to Beijing, and Red Guards in Beijing traveled outside the city to agitate the situation. Red Guards in various places supported each other, setting up liaison stations, attacking party and government organs, hunting down capitalist roaders, and destroying the Four Olds.

Over time, the movement evolved from having Beijing as its single destination, and expanded to other places such as Nanjing, Shanghai, Chengdu, Wuhan, Guangzhou, and Changsha. Some workers and cadres left their posts to participate, and many people took the opportunity to visit relatives and friends and to travel. It triggered a nationwide spike in traffic: long-distance buses, inland ships, ocean ships, and trains were overloaded. Train carriages with a capacity of around 100 people were loaded with 200-300 people. Coffee tables, luggage racks, seats, and aisles were crowded with passengers. There were even people in the restrooms and on the roofs of train cars. The overcrowding caused some to avoid public transport in favor of walking directly to their destination.

Red Guards flocked to the Jinggang Mountains, an important revolutionary site known as the birthplace of the Chinese Red Army, and the number of people reached 100,000 at its peak. The closing time of the Jinggangshan Revolution Museum was postponed to 23:30. There were nearly 1,000 cooks in the 17 reception stations under its jurisdiction, and more than 1 million Red Guards were received, costing more than 2.5 million yuan.

== End ==
On February 3 and March 19, 1967, the CCP Central Committee issued two notices to stop the nationwide Great Exchange. The February 3 notice "ordered an end to the exchange of revolutionary experience on foot and a return of all participants to their respective schools to participate in power seizures there", citing overcrowding, difficulties in arranging board and lodging, and disease. Reception stations in various places were gradually closed, and opportunities for revolutionary connection decreased. However, students were still able to ride for free and receive free food and accommodation.

According to Martin Singer, "the call to return to classes was unexpected, since classes had only recently been cancelled for the second half of the year. The cancellation of exchange of revolutionary experience was also surprising because a resumption of trips to Peking and elsewhere had been specifically promised in November". Singer adds that "The resumption of classes began very slowly. Many revolutionaries did not heed the initial calls to return. Reluctant to surrender their freedom, they saw no purpose in resuming classes until educational reforms had been enacted."

In August 1967, Mao Zedong called for people to "make revolution where they are". In October, the Central Committee issued a document requiring the "Resumption of Classes to Create Revolution", effectively ending the movement.

== Impact ==
The atmosphere created by the Great Exchange caused student Red Guards to break away from daily roles and behavioral norms. The sense of freedom stimulated the feeling of revolutionary rebellion and breaking from a revisionist party and government system. This was consistent with Mao Zedong's expectation at the meeting of the Politburo Standing Committee held in Hangzhou on June 10, 1966: "Students from all over the country should go to Beijing, and we should support them. It should be free. They will be happy to make a big fuss in Beijing." This move caused the normal state of operations to be disrupted nationwide. Traffic across the country was extremely congested, the social order in major and medium-sized cities fell into chaos, and production and construction were greatly affected.

The movement of millions in overcrowded conditions was a cause of the 1967 Chinese epidemic of cerebrospinal meningitis. By the end of 1967, 3.04 million cases of cerebrospinal meningitis and more than 160,000 fatalities had been recorded. Many affected were youths who had participated in the Great Exchange. Historians Roderick MacFarquhar and Michael Schoenhals noted that before 1966, "outbreaks of epidemic cerebral-spinal meningitis had been rare in China, and highly localized, in large part because of a low degree of popular mobility".

During an inspection in Tianjin in February 2024, Xi Jinping, the president of China and general secretary of the Chinese Communist Party, publicly mentioned his experience of buying steamed buns on the platform of Tianjin's railway station during the Great Exchange.

== See also ==
- 1967 Chinese epidemic of meningococcal meningitis
- Red August
