= Jing Tian (disambiguation) =

Jing Tian (born 1988) is a Chinese actress.

Jing Tian may also refer to:

- Jing Tian-Zörner (born 1963), Chinese-born German table tennis player
- Jing Tian (景天), a character in the video game by Softstar Entertainment Chinese Paladin 3 and the same title television series

== See also ==
- Jingtian (disambiguation)
- Rhodiola, known as Hong Jing Tian (紅景天)
