= Lianzhou Township =

Lianzhou Township 莲洲乡
- Township
- Location in Jiangxi Lianzhou Township (China)
- Coordinates: 27°2′44″N 114°15′24″E
- Country: People's Republic of China
- Province: Jiangxi
- Prefecture-level city: Ji'an
- County: Yongxin County
- Time zone: UTC+8 (China Standard)

Lianzhou Township (simplified Chinese: 莲洲乡; traditional Chinese: 蓮洲鄉; pinyin: Liánzhōu Xiāng) is a township under the administration of Yongxin County, Jiangxi, China. As of 2018, it has 9 villages under its administration.

== See also ==
- List of township-level divisions of Jiangxi
