= Yulin Township, Chongqing =

Yulin Township 鱼鳞乡
- Township
- Location in Chongqing
- Coordinates: 31°40′35″N 109°29′17″E
- Country: People's Republic of China
- Direct-administered municipality: Chongqing
- County: Wuxi County
- Time zone: UTC+8 (China Standard)

Yulin Township (simplified Chinese: 鱼鳞乡; traditional Chinese: 魚鱗鄉; pinyin: Yúlín Xiāng) is a township under the administration of Wuxi County, Chongqing, China. As of 2018, it has one residential community and 4 villages under its administration.

== See also ==
- List of township-level divisions of Chongqing
