= Wuxi County =

Wuxi 巫溪县 Wuki
- County
- Location of Wuxi County in Chongqing
- Coordinates (Wuxi County government): 31°23′55″N 109°34′12″E
- Country: People's Republic of China
- Municipality: Chongqing
- County seat: Chengxiang (城厢镇)

Government
  - Type: County
  - CPC Secretary: Tang De Xiang (唐德祥)
  - Mayor: Luo Cheng (罗成)

Area
  - County: 4,029.8 km^{2} (1,555.9 sq mi)

Population (2010)
  - County: 414,073
  - Density: 102.75/km^{2} (266.13/sq mi)
  - Urban: 163,000
- Time zone: UTC+8 (China Standard)
- Postal code: 405800
- Area code: 023
- GDP: 2013
- Total: CNY9.01 billion US$1.45 billion
- Per capita: CNY17,012; US$2,744
- Growth: ▲19.2%
- HDI: 0.758
- County flower: Peach
- Website: http://wx.cq.gov.cn/

Wuxi County (Chinese: 巫溪县; pinyin: Wūxī Xiàn) is a county of Chongqing Municipality, People's Republic of China, bordering Shaanxi to the north and Hubei to the northeast and east. Sitting at the upper reaches of Daning River and the southern slopes of the central Daba Mountains. It is best known for its scenic views and its preserved witchcraft culture.

Wuxi County is noted as a major tourism site of Chongqing.

== Administrative divisions ==
Wuxi County has 2 subdistricts and numerous towns and townships:

| Subdistricts | Towns | Townships |
|---|---|---|
| Baiyang Subdistrict (柏杨街道); Ninghe Subdistrict (宁河街道) | Bailu (白鹿镇); Chaoyang (朝阳镇); Chengxiang (城厢镇); Fenghuang (凤凰镇); Fengling (峰灵镇); Gulu (古路镇); Hongchiba (红池坝镇); Jianshan (尖山镇); Lingjiao (菱角镇, formerly 菱角乡); Ningchang (宁厂镇); Pulian (蒲莲镇, formerly 蒲莲乡); Shanghuang (上磺镇, formerly 上磺乡); Tangfang (塘坊镇); Tianba (田坝镇); Tongcheng (通城镇); Tucheng (土城镇, formerly 土城乡); Wenfeng (文峰镇); Xiabao/bu/pu (下堡镇); Xujia (徐家镇) | Changgui Township (长桂乡); Dahe Township (大河乡); Huatai Township (花台乡); Lanying Township (兰英乡); Shengli Township (胜利乡); Shuangyang Township (双阳乡); Tianxing Township (天星乡); Tianyuan Township (天元乡); Wulong Township (乌龙乡); Yulin Township (鱼鳞乡); Zhongliang Township (中梁乡) |

Former township:

- Zhonggang (中岗乡)

== Geography ==
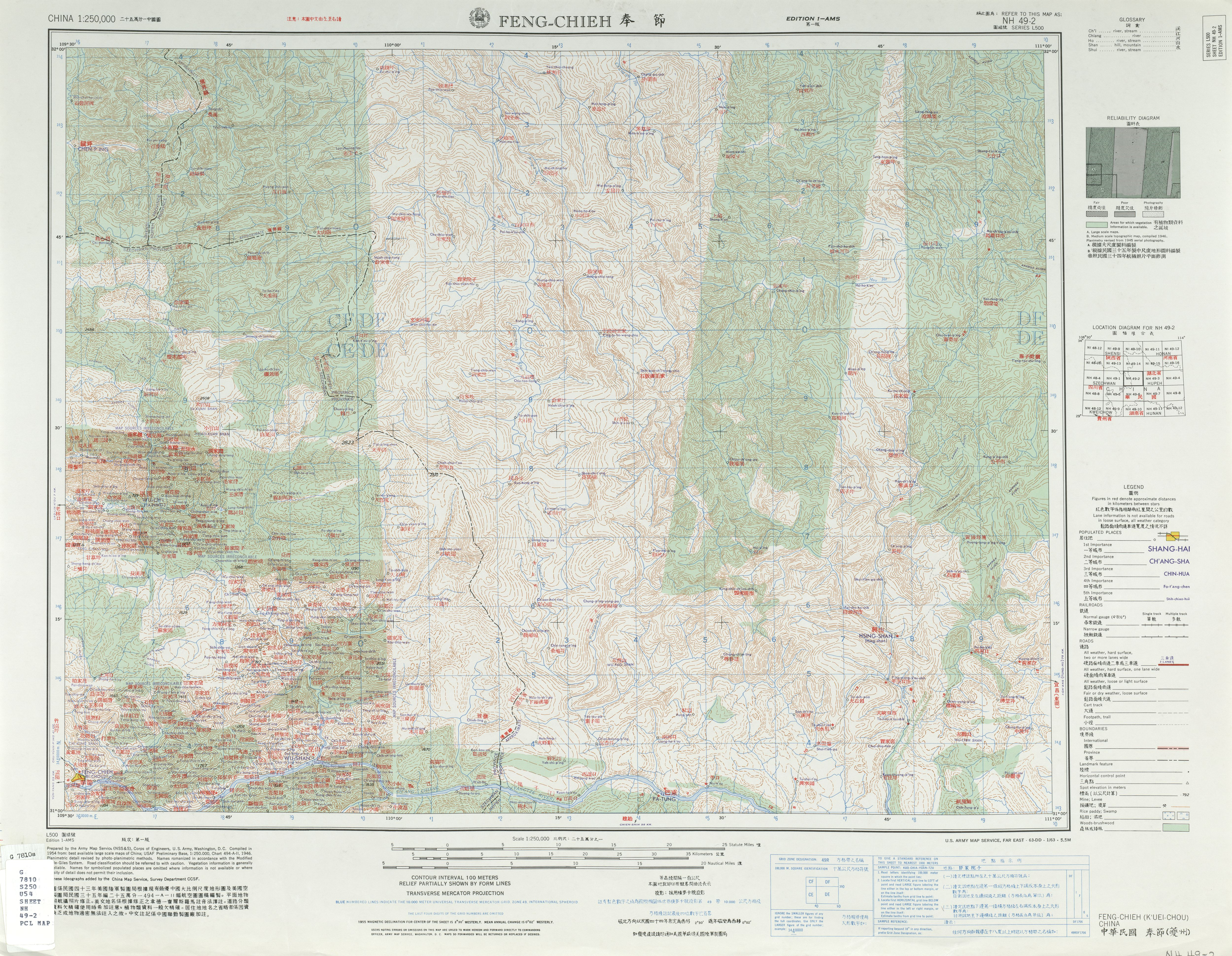
Map including Wuxi (labeled as WU-CH’I (TA-NING) 巫溪) (1954)

The vast majority of Wuxi's land area is mountainous. With a wet abundant precipitation, Wuxi County is suitable for many plants to grow, the local products are medicine nectar, starch, bacon, dried fruit, vegetables and antler.

== Climate ==
Climate data for Wuxi, elevation 338 m (1,109 ft), (1991–2020 normals, extremes 1981–present)
| Month | Jan | Feb | Mar | Apr | May | Jun | Jul | Aug | Sep | Oct | Nov | Dec | Year |
|---|---|---|---|---|---|---|---|---|---|---|---|---|---|
| Record high °C (°F) | 21.2 (70.2) | 27.3 (81.1) | 35.2 (95.4) | 37.7 (99.9) | 40.3 (104.5) | 42.4 (108.3) | 43.7 (110.7) | 44.2 (111.6) | 42.6 (108.7) | 36.2 (97.2) | 26.5 (79.7) | 20.2 (68.4) | 44.2 (111.6) |
| Mean daily maximum °C (°F) | 10.7 (51.3) | 13.7 (56.7) | 19.0 (66.2) | 24.6 (76.3) | 27.9 (82.2) | 31.1 (88.0) | 34.0 (93.2) | 34.5 (94.1) | 29.3 (84.7) | 23.0 (73.4) | 17.6 (63.7) | 12.1 (53.8) | 23.1 (73.6) |
| Daily mean °C (°F) | 6.6 (43.9) | 9.0 (48.2) | 13.2 (55.8) | 18.3 (64.9) | 21.9 (71.4) | 25.2 (77.4) | 27.8 (82.0) | 27.8 (82.0) | 23.5 (74.3) | 17.9 (64.2) | 12.9 (55.2) | 8.0 (46.4) | 17.7 (63.8) |
| Mean daily minimum °C (°F) | 3.7 (38.7) | 5.8 (42.4) | 9.2 (48.6) | 13.9 (57.0) | 17.7 (63.9) | 21.2 (70.2) | 23.7 (74.7) | 23.4 (74.1) | 19.8 (67.6) | 14.6 (58.3) | 9.8 (49.6) | 5.2 (41.4) | 14.0 (57.2) |
| Record low °C (°F) | −3.8 (25.2) | −1.8 (28.8) | 0.0 (32.0) | 4.1 (39.4) | 10.2 (50.4) | 15.1 (59.2) | 17.5 (63.5) | 16.8 (62.2) | 5.8 (42.4) | 4.0 (39.2) | 0.7 (33.3) | −3.0 (26.6) | −3.8 (25.2) |
| Average precipitation mm (inches) | 13.7 (0.54) | 21.6 (0.85) | 46.2 (1.82) | 94.3 (3.71) | 143.2 (5.64) | 165.8 (6.53) | 188.6 (7.43) | 139.3 (5.48) | 141.7 (5.58) | 105.8 (4.17) | 48.3 (1.90) | 13.6 (0.54) | 1,122.1 (44.19) |
| Average precipitation days (≥ 0.1 mm) | 6.6 | 6.5 | 10.2 | 12.6 | 14.1 | 13.0 | 13.3 | 12.2 | 12.3 | 12.3 | 9.9 | 6.7 | 129.7 |
| Average snowy days | 1.2 | 0.5 | 0.2 | 0 | 0 | 0 | 0 | 0 | 0 | 0 | 0 | 0.2 | 2.1 |
| Average relative humidity (%) | 72 | 68 | 67 | 70 | 72 | 74 | 75 | 71 | 74 | 79 | 79 | 76 | 73 |
| Mean monthly sunshine hours | 68.1 | 68.4 | 111.4 | 134.8 | 137.5 | 142.9 | 179.6 | 197.7 | 133.6 | 107.2 | 92.0 | 72.6 | 1,445.8 |
| Percentage possible sunshine | 21 | 22 | 30 | 35 | 32 | 34 | 42 | 49 | 36 | 31 | 29 | 23 | 32 |
Source: China Meteorological Administration all-time extreme temperature

== Economy ==
Total economy performance in 2013 is good and growth rate is accelerating. Total GDP is 9.01 billion yuan in 2013.

=== Farming in Wuxi County ===
Major products include rice, maize, potato, sweet potato, cotton, broccoli, cauliflower, spinach, carrot and soybean.

=== Wuxi Industry Park ===
Manufacturing is the most important economy sector of Wuxi County, they are separately located in several industrial park of Wuxi county. One industry park is in Fenghuang town(凤凰), another one is in Jianshan Town(尖山), the third industrial park is in Ninggang. They all are regulated by Wuxi Government.

=== Banking in Wuxi County ===
Agricultural Bank of China is the most popular bank in Wuxi County with Postal Savings Bank of China come to the second place under the regulation of People's Bank of China of Wuxi County

=== Mining in Wuxi County ===
Mining is still an important part of the economy of Wuxi County, The major areas of production in 2010 were coal, iron ore, natural gas, salt and zinc.

== Tourism ==
Tourism is a large industry in Wuxi county, with a number of tourism companies flourishing in recent years. The county's natural resources are some of the best preserved in Chongqing.

- Wuxi New Burg
- Wuxi Cave
- Wuxi Prairie
- Yuntai Temple
- Ning Town
- Daning Town of Yore
- Chinese New Year at Wuxi
- Daning River

== Transportation ==
Massive infrastructure programs started in 2008, like Wuxi-Yunyan highway, Wuxi-Fengjie highway and Wuxi-Zhenping highway with anticipation of completion in 2013 and that will be connected with other China National Highways

There is also a plan under consideration about building an airport in Wuxi County to serve the region across Shaanxi province, Sichuan province also other neighbouring provinces like Hubei, Guizhou, Hunan.

The Wuxi Long-distance Bus Station started bus service to Guangdong province and Shanghai in early 2009 while Wuxi Zhaojiaba Bus Station serves domestic transportation.

- Wuxi Long-distance Bus Station
- Wuxi Zhaojiaba Bus Station
- Port of Wuxi

== Education ==
=== Elementary schools ===
- Chengxiang Elementary School (城厢小学)
- Huancheng Elementary School (环城小学)
- Zhuhai Experiment Elementary School (珠海实验小学)

=== Middle and High Schools ===
- Wuxi Middle School (重庆市巫溪中学)
- Chenxiang Middle School (城厢中学)
- Wuxi GuLu Middle School (巫溪古路中学)
- Shanghuang Middle School (上磺中学)

=== Vocational Schools ===
- Huancheng Vocational School (环城职教中心)
- Wenfeng Vocational School (文峰职教中心)
