= Hechuan, Jiangxi =

Hechuan 禾川镇
- Town
- Location in Jiangxi Hechuan (China)
- Coordinates: 26°56′52″N 114°13′24″E
- Country: People's Republic of China
- Province: Jiangxi
- Prefecture-level city: Ji'an
- County: Yongxin County
- Time zone: UTC+8 (China Standard)

Hechuan (Chinese: 禾川; pinyin: Héchuān) is a town under the administration of Yongxin County, Jiangxi, China. As of 2020, it has ten residential neighborhoods and 21 villages under its administration:

Neighborhoods

- Fanrong Community (繁荣社区)
- Xianggan Community (湘赣社区)
- Xuebei Community (学背社区)
- Beimen Community (北门社区)
- Ximen Community (西门社区)
- Xiushui Community (秀水社区)
- Chengbei Community (城北社区)
- Hedong Community (河东社区)
- Erji (二机)
- Ganhua (赣化)

Villages

- Xiguang Village (西光村)
- Beimen Village (北门村)
- Xuebei Village (学背村)
- Ximen Village (西门村)
- Xiushui Village (秀水村)
- Xisheng Village (西胜村)
- Paotian Village (袍田村)
- Faguan Village (发官村)
- Quanshan Village (泉山村)
- Sanyueping Village (三月坪村)
- Dongli Village (东里村)
- Hengjiang Village (横江村)
- Biantian Village (汴田村)
- Yangjia Village (阳家村)
- Nanche Village (南车村)
- Futou Village (富头村)
- Zhangshi Village (樟石村)
- Miaoshan Village (庙山村)
- Lutang Village (芦塘村)
- Xiaduan Village (下段村)
- Jingquan Village (井泉村)

== See also ==
- List of township-level divisions of Jiangxi
