= Guannan County =

Guannan 灌南县
- County
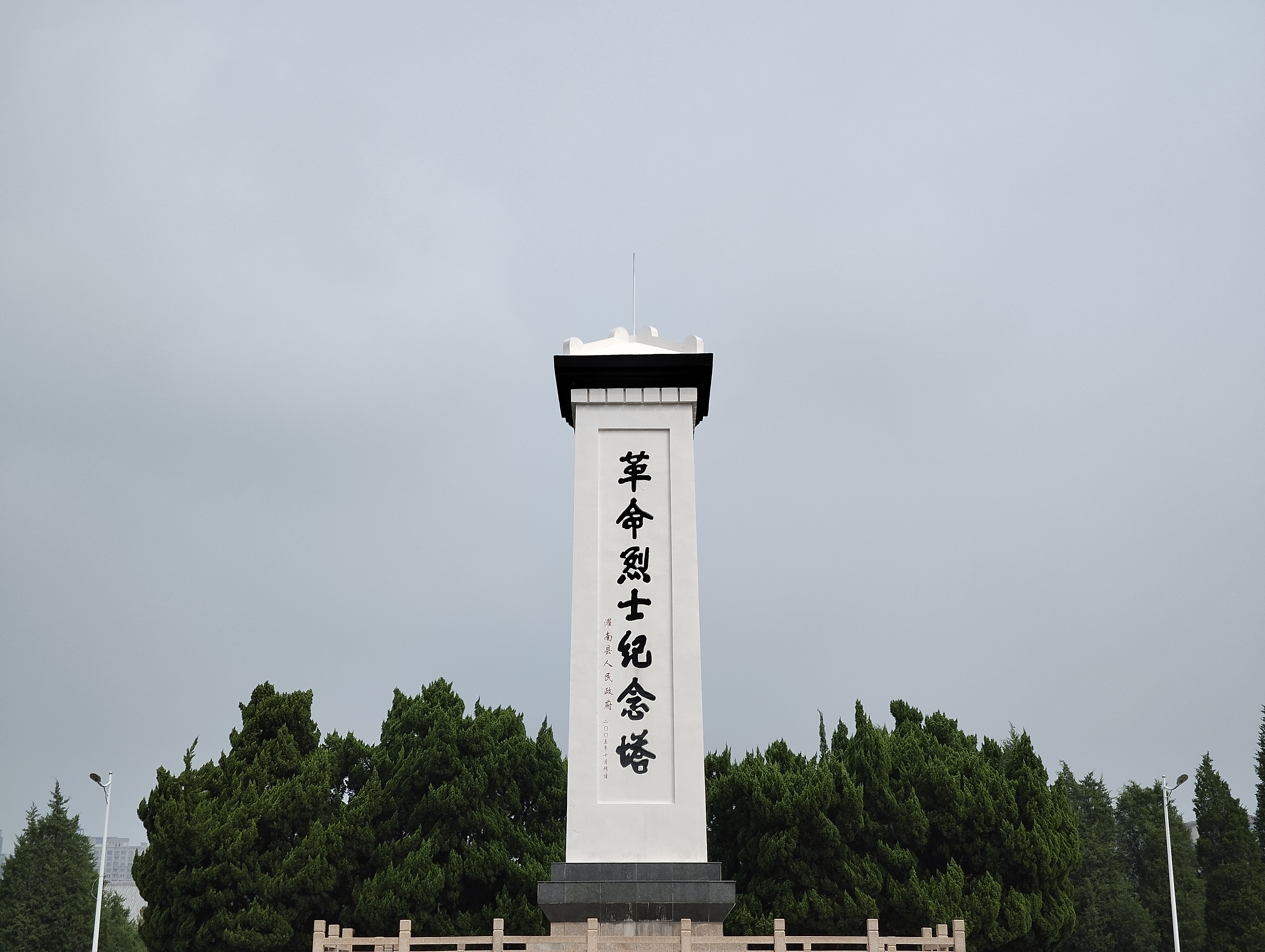

- Location in Jiangsu
- Coordinates: 34°05′35″N 119°21′04″E
- Country: People's Republic of China
- Province: Jiangsu
- Prefecture-level city: Lianyungang

Area
  - County: 1,030 km^{2} (400 sq mi)

Population (2020)
  - County: 612,345
  - Density: 595/km^{2} (1,540/sq mi)
  - Urban: 323,820
  - Rural: 288,525
- Time zone: UTC+8 (China Standard)
- Postal code: 222502 ~ 223500
- Website: guannan.gov.cn

Guannan County (simplified Chinese: 灌南县; traditional Chinese: 灌南縣; pinyin: Guànnán Xiàn) is under the administration of Lianyungang, Jiangsu province, China.

== Administrative divisions ==
At present, Guannan County has 9 towns and 5 townships.

9 towns

- Xin'an (新安镇)
- Changmao (长茂镇)
- Duigougang (堆沟港镇)
- Beichenji (北陈集镇)
- Zhangdian (张店镇)
- Sankou (三口镇)
- Mengxingzhuang (孟兴庄镇)
- Tanggou (汤沟镇)
- Bailu (百禄镇)

5 townships

- Wudui (五队乡)
- Tianlou (田楼乡)
- Liji (李集乡)
- Xinji (新集乡)
- Huayuan (花园乡)

== Climate ==
Climate data for Guannan, elevation 8 m (26 ft), (1991–2020 normals, extremes 1981–present)
Month	Jan	Feb	Mar	Apr	May	Jun	Jul	Aug	Sep	Oct	Nov	Dec	Year
Record high °C (°F)	17.8 (64.0)	25.7 (78.3)	32.5 (90.5)	32.3 (90.1)	36.0 (96.8)	37.6 (99.7)	37.9 (100.2)	36.8 (98.2)	35.2 (95.4)	32.0 (89.6)	27.6 (81.7)	19.7 (67.5)	37.9 (100.2)
Mean daily maximum °C (°F)	5.9 (42.6)	8.6 (47.5)	13.8 (56.8)	20.2 (68.4)	25.4 (77.7)	29.2 (84.6)	31.0 (87.8)	30.4 (86.7)	26.9 (80.4)	22.0 (71.6)	15.0 (59.0)	8.3 (46.9)	19.7 (67.5)
Daily mean °C (°F)	0.9 (33.6)	3.4 (38.1)	8.2 (46.8)	14.4 (57.9)	19.9 (67.8)	24.1 (75.4)	27.1 (80.8)	26.4 (79.5)	22.0 (71.6)	16.3 (61.3)	9.6 (49.3)	3.2 (37.8)	14.6 (58.3)
Mean daily minimum °C (°F)	−2.9 (26.8)	−0.8 (30.6)	3.5 (38.3)	9.3 (48.7)	14.8 (58.6)	19.7 (67.5)	23.9 (75.0)	23.3 (73.9)	18.2 (64.8)	11.7 (53.1)	5.2 (41.4)	−0.8 (30.6)	10.4 (50.8)
Record low °C (°F)	−11.5 (11.3)	−14.3 (6.3)	−7.7 (18.1)	−0.9 (30.4)	5.0 (41.0)	11.0 (51.8)	17.0 (62.6)	14.1 (57.4)	8.5 (47.3)	1.0 (33.8)	−6.2 (20.8)	−12.4 (9.7)	−14.3 (6.3)
Average precipitation mm (inches)	22.6 (0.89)	27.7 (1.09)	37.4 (1.47)	48.6 (1.91)	69.1 (2.72)	119.2 (4.69)	206.8 (8.14)	198.0 (7.80)	90.9 (3.58)	37.9 (1.49)	41.8 (1.65)	22.7 (0.89)	922.7 (36.32)
Average precipitation days (≥ 0.1 mm)	4.9	6.0	7.0	7.0	8.8	8.8	13.6	12.7	8.0	6.1	6.3	5.0	94.2
Average snowy days	3.0	2.9	1.0	0.1	0	0	0	0	0	0	0.5	1.0	8.5
Average relative humidity (%)	70	70	68	68	72	76	84	86	82	76	74	71	75
Mean monthly sunshine hours	144.5	145.5	178.4	203.0	215.4	171.9	169.9	178.2	180.5	176.6	150.6	150.4	2,064.9
Percentage possible sunshine	46	47	48	52	50	40	39	43	49	51	49	49	47
Source: China Meteorological Administration
