= Lu Shibi =

Chinese orthopedist (1930–2020)

- 卢世璧
- Born: July 8, 1930; Yichang, Hubei, China
- Died: March 28, 2020 (aged 89); Beijing, China
- Education: Tsinghua University; Peking Union Medical College
- Scientific career
- Fields: Orthopaedics
- Workplaces: PLA General Hospital

Chinese name
- Traditional Chinese: 盧世璧
- Simplified Chinese: 卢世璧
Transcriptions
Standard Mandarin
- Hanyu Pinyin: Lú Shìbì

Lu Shibi (Chinese: 卢世璧; pinyin: Lú Shìbì; 8 July 1930 – 28 March 2020) was a Chinese orthopedist who was director of the PLA Institute of Orthopaedics. He was a professor and chief physician of the PLA General Hospital. He was master supervisor and doctoral supervisor at the Medical College, Nankai University.

== Biography ==
Lu was born in Yichang, Hubei, on July 8, 1930. His father Lu Yongchun (卢永春) was a tuberculosis specialist. In 1948 he was accepted to Tsinghua University, three years later, he transferred to Peking Union Medical College. After graduation, he worked at the university. In 1958, he was dispatched to the PLA General Hospital. On March 28, 2020, he died of illness in Beijing, aged 89.

== Selected papers ==
- Quan Q; Hong L; Chang B; Liu RX; Zhang YQ; Zhao Q; Lu SB (2016). "A radiographic simulation study of fixed superior pubic ramus fractures with retrograde screw insertion". J Orthop. 13–4 (4): 364–368. doi:10.1016/j.jor.2016.07.005. PMC 4949495. PMID 27504056.
- Quan Q; Hong L; Chang B; Liu RX; Zhu Y; Peng J; Lu SB (2017). "The Scaphoid Safe Zone: A Radiographic Simulation Study to Prevent Cortical Perforation Arising from Different Views". PLOS ONE. 12–1 (1) e0170677. Bibcode:2017PLoSO..1270677Q. doi:10.1371/journal.pone.0170677. PMC 5256911. PMID 28114317.
- Yang, Qiang; Peng, Jiang; Guo, Quanyi; Huang, Jingxiang; Zhang, Li; Yao, Jun; Yang, Fei; Wang, Shenguo; Xu, Wenjing; Wang, Aiyuan; Lu, Shibi (2008). "A cartilage ECM-derived 3-D porous acellular matrix scaffold for in vivo cartilage tissue engineering with PKH26-labeled chondrogenic bone marrow-derived mesenchymal stem cells". Biomaterials. 29 (15). Elsevier BV: 2378–2387. doi:10.1016/j.biomaterials.2008.01.037. ISSN 0142-9612.

== Honours and awards ==
- 1996 Member of the Chinese Academy of Engineering (CAE)
- 1997 Science and Technology Progress Award of the Ho Leung Ho Lee Foundation
