= Bailu Township, Chongren County =

Bailu Township 白路乡
- Township
- Location in Jiangxi Bailu Township (China)
- Coordinates: 27.9066°N 116.2037°E
- Country: People's Republic of China
- Province: Jiangxi
- Prefecture-level city: Fuzhou
- County: Chongren County
- Time zone: UTC+8 (China Standard)

Bailu Township (simplified Chinese: 白路乡; traditional Chinese: 白路鄉; pinyin: Báilù Xiāng) is a township under the administration of Chongren County, Jiangxi, China. As of 2018, it has 8 villages under its administration.
