= Diane Delin =

American jazz violinist, composer, and educator

- Born: Evanston, Illinois, US
- Genres: Jazz
- Occupation(s): Musician, recording artist, composer, producer, educator
- Instrument: Violin
- Years active: 1985–present
- Labels: Blujazz
- Website: https://dianedelin.com

Diane Delin is an American jazz violinist, recording artist, composer, producer and educator based in the Chicago area.

== Career ==
Delin has recorded five albums, all with the Blujazz label. Her recordings and performances earned her DownBeat magazine's Critics Poll Rising Star category in 2005, 2007, 2008, and 2009. Delin has toured and recorded with her own groups, including quartets and a duo with pianist Dennis Luxion with whom she recorded the album Duality in 2004. Delin also leads Octagon, a hybrid chamber ensemble, in which she fuses a jazz quartet with a string quartet. Delin has several credits as an arranger and producer. She also toured with the Frank Sinatra Orchestra from 1991-94 and has been a section player with The Manhattan Transfer, Ray Charles, Gladys Knight and Smokey Robinson.

Since 2004 Delin has been an adjunct professor at Columbia College in Chicago, IL where she has taught jazz, classical, folk and pop strings as well as string improvisation, jazz combo and chamber music.

Delin received her bachelor of arts in music performance at Northwestern University studying classical violin under Edgar Muenzer of the Chicago Symphony Orchestra. She studied jazz with saxophonist Joe Daley. Delin also earned a Master in Community Arts Management from University of Illinois.

== Discography ==
As Lead

- Another Morning (1997)
- Origins (1999)
- Talking Stick (2001)
- Duality with Dennis Luxion (2004)
- Offerings for a Peaceable Season (2006)
- Chicago Standard Time featuring Jodie Christian (2021; recorded 1991)

As Producer

- Bob Acri with Diane Delin, George Mraz, Lew Soloff, Ed Thigpen, Frank Wess (Blujazz, 2004)
- Wild Is the Wind, Dee Alexander (Blujazz, 2009)
