= Bailu Township, Jinggangshan =

Bailu Township 柏露乡
- Township
- Location in Jiangxi Bailu Township (China)
- Coordinates: 26°41′10″N 114°6′45″E
- Country: People's Republic of China
- Province: Jiangxi
- Prefecture-level city: Ji'an
- County-level city: Jinggangshan
- Time zone: UTC+8 (China Standard)

Bailu Township (simplified Chinese: 柏露乡; traditional Chinese: 柏露鄉; pinyin: Bǎilù Xiāng) is a township under the administration of Jinggangshan City, Jiangxi, China. As of 2018, it has 6 villages under its administration.

== See also ==
- List of township-level divisions of Jiangxi
