= Hua Sanchuan =

Chinese painter

Lotus Ching Shu - Hua Sanchuan color on silk 1997

Hua Sanchuan (simplified Chinese: 华三川; traditional Chinese: 華三川; pinyin: Huá Sānchuān; Wade–Giles: Hwa San Chiuen, 1930–2004) was a Chinese painter and illustrator. His career spanned six decades.

Hua was born in Zhejiang, China, to a poor family and is said to have discovered painting at age 8, being considered a "child prodigy" . He began his career illustrating and writing comic strips and children's books in the 1950s. He worked in Children's Publishing House in Shanghai. He was a member of the Chinese Artists Association and won national awards for his comics.

He is best known for his detailed figure paintings published in his Book of 100 Beauties. His paintings of graceful ladies are based on many fairy tales, legends, poetry and historical figures. His style is an elegant line drawing outline around on figures with delicate or deep color and suggested backgrounds. The ink brushwork is from the traditional Chinese technique, with a mix of Western watercolor technique. These paintings are popular in China due to their wide appeal of idealized female beauty, vitality and historic nostalgia. They have appeared in many books and calendars.

== Awards ==
Hua's 1963 work, Traffic Station's Story won the First National second prize for comic writing. Hua's 1981 comic book, White-haired Girl won Second National Assessment by the first painting prize. The Necklace won National third prize for comic writing.

== Books ==
- Jin Se Love, 锦瑟年华
- Hua Sanchuan People Paintings 华三川人物画集 2001 ISBN 978-7-80503-549-9
- Hua Sanchuan line draw characters out 华三川人物线描画搞
- Hua Sanchuan painted the new 100 beauties 华三川绘新百美图 2002 ISBN 7-5325-3242-9
- Hua Sanchuan new characters to make the election 华三川人物新作选

== Comic works ==
- "Traffic Stop Stories"
- "White"
- "Young Guard"
- "WANG Xiao and"
- "Liu Hulan
- "Seven Guizhi"
