= Judy Delin =

British linguist

Judith Lesley (Judy) Delin is a language expert with an academic background in linguistics who is currently Partner at Doctrine Ltd, a London-based language and information design company. She held previous roles at The Brand Union and The Information Design Unit. Prior to this, she was Professor of Language and Communication at the University of Leeds (2005–2007) and the University of Reading (2008–2010) and published the book The Language of Everyday Life in 2000. She obtained her PhD in Cognitive Science from The University of Edinburgh in 1990, under the joint supervision of Ewan Klein and Graeme Ritchie, with a dissertation on cleft sentences, and a BA in English Studies from The University of Nottingham in 1984.
