= Joseph Charignon =

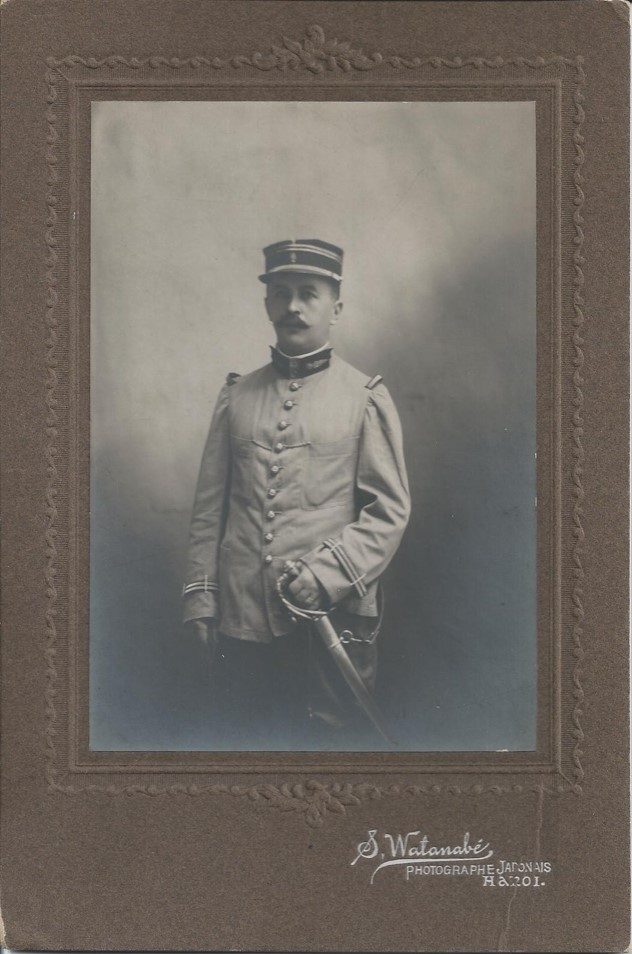
- Born: Antoine Joseph Henri Charignon; 23 September 1872; Châteaudouble
- Died: 17 August 1930 (aged 57); Beijing
- Occupation(s): Engineer sinologist

Sha Hai'Ang (in Chinese : 沙海昂) (23 September 1872 – 17 August 1930), was a Franco-Chinese engineer from École Centrale des Arts et Manufactures (now Centrale-Supélec) whose French name was Antoine Joseph Henri Charignon. A railway constructor but also a sinologist and historian, he is particularly known for his work on Marco Polo. He was a member of the Société Asiatique and the Société de géographie of Paris.

Following his life in China and his accession to Chinese nationality, A. J. H. Charignon adopted the Chinese pronunciation of his name, Sha Hai'Ang, which literally means "sand sea".

== See also ==
- Kunming–Hai Phong Railway
