= Bailu, Chongqing =

Bailu 白鹿镇
- Town
- Location in Chongqing
- Coordinates: 31°36′33″N 109°40′36″E
- Country: People's Republic of China
- Direct-administered municipality: Chongqing
- County: Wuxi County
- Time zone: UTC+8 (China Standard)

Bailu (Chinese: 白鹿; pinyin: Báilù) is a town under the administration of Wuxi County, Chongqing, China. As of 2018, it has 2 residential communities and 10 villages under its administration.

== See also ==
- List of township-level divisions of Chongqing
