= Wang Yingluo =

Chinese academic (1930–2023)

- 汪应洛
- Born: 21 May 1930; Jing County, Anhui, China
- Died: 11 July 2023 (aged 93); Xi'an, Shaanxi, China
- Education: National Jiaotong University; Harbin Institute of Technology
- Scientific career
- Fields: Management science Management engineering
- Workplaces: School of Management, Xi'an Jiaotong University

Chinese name
- Simplified Chinese: 汪应洛
- Traditional Chinese: 汪應洛
Transcriptions
Standard Mandarin
- Hanyu Pinyin: Wāng Yìngluò

Wang Yingluo (Chinese: 汪应洛; 21 May 1930 – 11 July 2023) was a Chinese academic in the fields of management science and management engineering, a former vice president of Xi'an Jiaotong University, and an academician of the Chinese Academy of Engineering.

== Biography ==
Wang was born in Jing County, Anhui, on 21 May 1930. In 1948, he entered the Department of Mechanical Engineering, National Jiaotong University. After completing his bachelor's degree in 1952, he enrolled at Harbin Institute of Technology where he obtained his master's degree in 1955. He joined the Chinese Communist Party (CCP) in September 1952.

After graduation, Wang became a teaching assistant at the National Jiaotong University (reshuffled as Xi'an Jiaotong University in 1957), where he was later appointed director of the Department of Management Engineering in September 1978 then dean of the School of Management in January 1984 and vice president in March of the same year.

On 11 July 2023, Wang died in Xi'an, Shaanxi, at the age of 93.

== Honours and awards ==
- 2003 Member of the Chinese Academy of Engineering (CAE)
