= Bailu Park =

Urban park in Beijing, China

Bailu Park White Deer Park
- Type: Urban park
- Location: Beijing, China
- Area: 28.7 hectares (71 acres)
- Created: 2008
- Status: Open all year

Bailu Park (Chinese: 白鹿公园; lit. 'White Deer Park') is one of major public parks located in the Chaoyang District of Beijing, China, right next to Guta Park. It was created in 2008, as one of the first 15 suburban parks planned by Beijing government. The name Bailu literally means white deer. The park got this name because during Ming Dynasty (1368 - 1644), the place of the current park was used to raise white deer, and those deer were pets of royal family members.
