= Jintian =

Jintian may refer to:

- Jintian, Guangxi (金田), a town in Guiping, Guangxi, China
- Jintian Park, a park in Chaoyang District, Beijing, China
- Jintian (journal), a Chinese literary journal
- Shaohao, also known as Jintian (金天), legendary Chinese sovereign

== See also ==
- Jintian Uprising, an 1851 uprising against the Qing dynasty by the Taiping rebels, named after the town
