= Maoping Township, Jiangxi =

Maoping Township 茅坪乡
- Township
- Location in Jiangxi Maoping Township (China)
- Coordinates: 26°39′59″N 114°02′58″E
- Country: People's Republic of China
- Province: Jiangxi
- Prefecture-level city: Ji'an
- County-level city: Jinggangshan

Area
  - Total: 40.05 km^{2} (15.46 sq mi)
- Elevation: 355 m (1,165 ft)

Population (2009)
  - Total: 4,650
  - Density: 116/km^{2} (301/sq mi)
- Time zone: UTC+8 (China Standard)
- Postal code: 343604

Maoping (Chinese: 茅坪; pinyin: Máopíng) is a township in the Jinggang Mountains and administratively part of Jinggangshan City, in southwestern Jiangxi province, China. It is noted as the location of the headquarters of the 4th Division of the Chinese Red Army and the base of operations of Yuan Wencai. The township is served by China National Highway 319. As of 2018, it has 6 villages under its administration.

The town is known for the first headquarters of the Chinese Red Army (formally the First Workers' and Peasants Revolutionary Army) led by Mao Zedong but Maoping was retaken by the Kuomintang's National Revolutionary Army.

== See also ==
- List of township-level divisions of Jiangxi
