= Li Daozeng =

Chinese architect (1930–2020)

- 李道增
- Born: January 19, 1930; Shanghai, China
- Died: March 19, 2020 (aged 90); Beijing, China
- Education: Tsinghua University
- Scientific career
- Fields: Architecture
- Workplaces: Tsinghua University
- Doctoral advisor: Liang Sicheng

Li Daozeng (Chinese: 李道增; pinyin: Lǐ Dàozēng; January 19, 1930 – March 19, 2020) was a Chinese architect who was a professor and doctoral supervisor at Tsinghua University. He was a member of the Architectural Society of China.

== Biography ==
Li was born in Shanghai, on January 19, 1930, while his ancestral home was in Hefei, Anhui. He was a descendant of Li Hezhang, a younger brother of Li Hongzhang. He secondary studied at Nanyang Model High School. In 1947 he was accepted to Tsinghua University, he studied electromechanics at the beginning, but switched to architecture a year later. After graduation, he taught at the university, where he was promoted to associate professor in 1979 and to full professor in 1983. He became director of the Department of Architecture in 1983 and dean of the School of Architecture in 1988. In 1993, he was hired as a visiting professor at Carnegie Mellon University in the United States.

Li died on March 19, 2020, in Beijing at the age of 90.

== Architectural works ==
- Beijing Tianqiao Theatre renovations 1993-2001
- National Centre for the Performing Arts (China) proposal 1958
- China Children Theatre, Beijing
- New Tsinghua School

== Honours and awards ==
- 1999 Member of the Chinese Academy of Engineering (CAE)
