= Bailu, Hejiang County =

Bailu 白鹿镇
- Town
- Location in Sichuan
- Coordinates: 28°55′20″N 105°58′45″E
- Country: People's Republic of China
- Province: Sichuan
- Prefecture-level city: Luzhou
- County: Hejiang County
- Time zone: UTC+8 (China Standard)

Bailu (Chinese: 白鹿; pinyin: Báilù) is a town under the administration of Hejiang County, Sichuan, China. As of 2018, it has one residential community and 11 villages under its administration.

== See also ==
- List of township-level divisions of Sichuan
