= Bailu Township, Gansu =

Bailu Township 白碌乡
- Township
- Location in Gansu
- Coordinates: 35°58′56″N 104°30′51″E
- Country: People's Republic of China
- Province: Gansu
- Prefecture-level city: Dingxi
- District: Anding District
- Time zone: UTC+8 (China Standard)

Bailu Township (simplified Chinese: 白碌乡; traditional Chinese: 白碌鄉; pinyin: Báilù Xiāng) is a township under the administration of Anding District, Dingxi, Gansu, China. As of 2020, it has seven villages under its administration:

- Lufeng Village (录丰村)
- Huajian Village (铧尖村)
- Zhuainian Village (拽碾村)
- Qianjin Village (前进村)
- Tianjiacha Village (田家岔村)
- Zhongshan Village (中山村)
- Fuxing Village (复兴村)
