= Jinggangshan City =

Jinggangshan 井冈山市
- County-level city
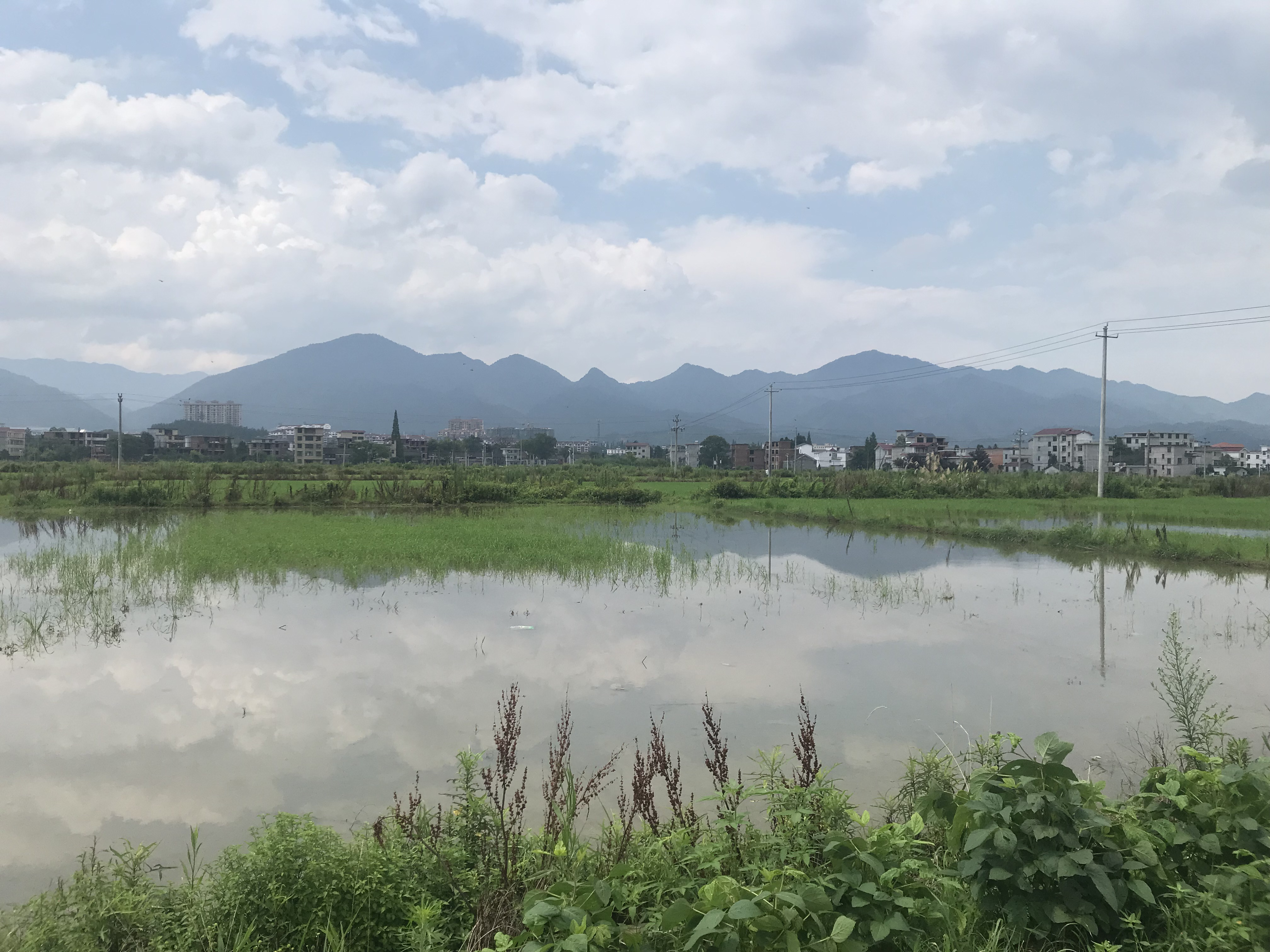

- Location of Jinggangshan City (red) within Ji'an City (gold) and Jiangxi
- Coordinates: 26°44′53″N 114°17′20″E
- Country: People's Republic of China
- Province: Jiangxi
- Prefecture-level city: Ji'an

Area
  - Total: 1,276 km^{2} (493 sq mi)

Population
  - Total: 156,000
  - Density: 122/km^{2} (317/sq mi)
- Time zone: UTC+8 (China Standard)
- Postal code: 343600
- Area code: 0796
- Website: www.jgs.gov.cn

Jinggangshan (simplified Chinese: 井冈山; traditional Chinese: 井岡山; pinyin: Jǐnggāngshān) is a county-level city in the southwest of Jiangxi province, People's Republic of China, bordering Hunan province to the west. It is under the administration of the Ji'an City. It is located in the Luoxiao Mountains which cover some 670 km^{2} (260 sq mi).

== Administrative divisions ==
At present, Jinggangshan City has one subdistrict, five towns, and 12 townships.

1 subdistrict

- Ciping (茨坪街道)

5 towns

- Xiaping (夏坪镇)
- Longshi (龙市镇)
- Gucheng (古城镇)
- Xincheng (新城镇)
- Dalong (大陇镇)

12 townships

- Nashan (拿山乡)
- Huang'ao (黄垇乡)
- Xiaqi (下七乡)
- Changping (长坪乡)
- Aoli (坳里乡)
- Eling (鹅岭乡)
- Bailu (柏露乡)
- Maoping (茅坪乡)
- Getian (葛田乡)
- Hehua (荷花乡)
- Mucun (睦村乡)
- Dongshang (东上乡)

== Transport ==
Jinggangshan Airport in Taihe County, Ji'an serves Jinggangshan.

== Climate ==
Climate data for Jinggangshan (Xiaping), elevation 253 m (830 ft), (1991–2020 normals)
Month	Jan	Feb	Mar	Apr	May	Jun	Jul	Aug	Sep	Oct	Nov	Dec	Year
Mean daily maximum °C (°F)	10.9 (51.6)	13.9 (57.0)	17.5 (63.5)	24.2 (75.6)	28.1 (82.6)	30.9 (87.6)	34.1 (93.4)	33.2 (91.8)	29.7 (85.5)	25.1 (77.2)	19.6 (67.3)	13.8 (56.8)	23.4 (74.2)
Daily mean °C (°F)	6.3 (43.3)	8.8 (47.8)	12.4 (54.3)	18.3 (64.9)	22.6 (72.7)	25.7 (78.3)	27.8 (82.0)	27.2 (81.0)	24.1 (75.4)	19.2 (66.6)	13.5 (56.3)	8.1 (46.6)	17.8 (64.1)
Mean daily minimum °C (°F)	3.4 (38.1)	5.5 (41.9)	9.0 (48.2)	14.3 (57.7)	18.8 (65.8)	22.1 (71.8)	23.5 (74.3)	23.3 (73.9)	20.3 (68.5)	15.1 (59.2)	9.5 (49.1)	4.4 (39.9)	14.1 (57.4)
Average precipitation mm (inches)	78.8 (3.10)	87.8 (3.46)	170.3 (6.70)	174.1 (6.85)	228.9 (9.01)	274.6 (10.81)	160.8 (6.33)	199.3 (7.85)	112.0 (4.41)	64.5 (2.54)	82.8 (3.26)	59.8 (2.35)	1,693.7 (66.67)
Average precipitation days (≥ 0.1 mm)	15.3	14.9	19.3	18.1	18.8	18.0	13.9	16.5	11.7	9.3	11.4	11.5	178.7
Average snowy days	3.0	1.6	0.3	0	0	0	0	0	0	0	0	0.6	5.5
Average relative humidity (%)	83	83	84	82	82	84	79	81	81	79	81	80	82
Mean monthly sunshine hours	67.7	71.8	75.4	103.4	125.2	131.4	206.3	190.0	150.0	143.3	122.2	111.3	1,498
Percentage possible sunshine	20	22	20	27	30	32	49	47	41	41	38	34	33
Source: China Meteorological Administration

Climate data for Jinggangshan (Ciping), elevation 843 m (2,766 ft), (1991–2020 normals, extremes 1981–present)
Month	Jan	Feb	Mar	Apr	May	Jun	Jul	Aug	Sep	Oct	Nov	Dec	Year
Record high °C (°F)	22.7 (72.9)	27.2 (81.0)	32.4 (90.3)	33.0 (91.4)	32.7 (90.9)	34.4 (93.9)	36.7 (98.1)	35.1 (95.2)	33.4 (92.1)	32.4 (90.3)	29.0 (84.2)	22.2 (72.0)	36.7 (98.1)
Mean daily maximum °C (°F)	8.0 (46.4)	10.8 (51.4)	14.3 (57.7)	20.3 (68.5)	23.9 (75.0)	26.4 (79.5)	29.0 (84.2)	28.3 (82.9)	25.3 (77.5)	21.2 (70.2)	16.4 (61.5)	10.9 (51.6)	19.6 (67.2)
Daily mean °C (°F)	3.8 (38.8)	6.2 (43.2)	9.8 (49.6)	15.4 (59.7)	19.4 (66.9)	22.2 (72.0)	24.1 (75.4)	23.5 (74.3)	20.6 (69.1)	16.1 (61.0)	11.1 (52.0)	5.7 (42.3)	14.8 (58.7)
Mean daily minimum °C (°F)	1.3 (34.3)	3.3 (37.9)	6.8 (44.2)	11.9 (53.4)	16.0 (60.8)	19.2 (66.6)	20.5 (68.9)	20.4 (68.7)	17.6 (63.7)	12.8 (55.0)	7.7 (45.9)	2.6 (36.7)	11.7 (53.0)
Record low °C (°F)	−9.2 (15.4)	−7.3 (18.9)	−5.8 (21.6)	−0.7 (30.7)	4.0 (39.2)	9.0 (48.2)	12.7 (54.9)	14.6 (58.3)	9.5 (49.1)	0.8 (33.4)	−4.2 (24.4)	−10.1 (13.8)	−10.1 (13.8)
Average precipitation mm (inches)	71.4 (2.81)	89.6 (3.53)	163.4 (6.43)	168.6 (6.64)	225.1 (8.86)	308.5 (12.15)	253.5 (9.98)	281.3 (11.07)	162.9 (6.41)	78.8 (3.10)	78.0 (3.07)	58.8 (2.31)	1,939.9 (76.36)
Average precipitation days (≥ 0.1 mm)	16.1	15.8	20.9	19.6	21.5	20.4	17.9	20.8	16.3	11.8	12.5	12.9	206.5
Average snowy days	4.4	2.2	0.8	0.1	0	0	0	0	0	0	0.1	1.3	8.9
Average relative humidity (%)	86	87	89	86	87	88	85	87	87	83	83	81	86
Mean monthly sunshine hours	70.6	67.5	67.0	88.2	96.0	93.6	159.9	139.2	118.4	125.5	117.5	113.2	1,256.6
Percentage possible sunshine	21	21	18	23	23	23	38	35	32	35	36	35	28
Source: China Meteorological Administration

== See also ==
- Jinggang Mountains
