= Pan Junhua =

Chinese engineer (1930–2023)

- 潘君骅
- Born: 14 October 1930; Shanghai, China
- Died: 18 December 2023 (aged 93); Suzhou, Jiangsu, China
- Education: Tsinghua University
- Scientific career
- Fields: Applied optics
- Workplaces: Nanjing Astronomical Instrument Research Center, Chinese Academy of Sciences

Chinese name
- Simplified Chinese: 潘君骅
- Traditional Chinese: 潘君驊
Transcriptions
Standard Mandarin
- Hanyu Pinyin: Pān Junhuá

Pan Junhua (Chinese: 潘君骅; 14 October 1930 – 18 December 2023) was a Chinese applied optics engineer, and an academician of the Chinese Academy of Engineering. He was a member of the Chinese Communist Party.

== Biography ==
Pan was born in Shanghai, on 14 October 1930, while his ancestral home in Changzhou, Jiangsu. He attended the Wukang County Middle School and Shanghai Nanyang Model High School. In 1949, he was accepted to the Department of Mechanical Engineering, Tsinghua University. After university in 1952, he was despatched to the Changchun Institute of Optics, Fine Mechanics and Physics. In 1956, he went to the Pulkovo Observatory in the Soviet Union to study astronomical optics and obtained an associate doctoral degree under the supervision of academician Maksutov (马克苏托夫).

He returned to China in 1960 and continued to work at the Changchun Institute of Optics, Fine Mechanics and Physics. In 1980, he was transferred to the Nanjing Astronomical Instrument Research Center, where he led the development of a 2.16-meter optical astronomical telescope, which earned him the First Class of State Science and Technology Progress Award in 1998. He became a researcher at the Institute of Modern Optics, Suzhou University in May 2000.

In 2019, an asteroid with the international designation 216331 was officially named "Pan Junhua Asteroid" in recognition of Pan's significant contributions in the field of applied optics research for a long time.

On 18 December 2023, he died from an illness in Suzhou, at the age of 93.

== Honours and awards ==
- 1998 State Science and Technology Progress Award (First Class) for the 2.16-meter optical astronomical telescope
- 1999 Member of the Chinese Academy of Engineering (CAE)
- 1999 State Science and Technology Progress Award (Third Class) for the folded axis stepped grating spectrometer
