= Châteaudouble, Drôme =

Châteaudouble Chastèudoble (Occitan)
- Commune
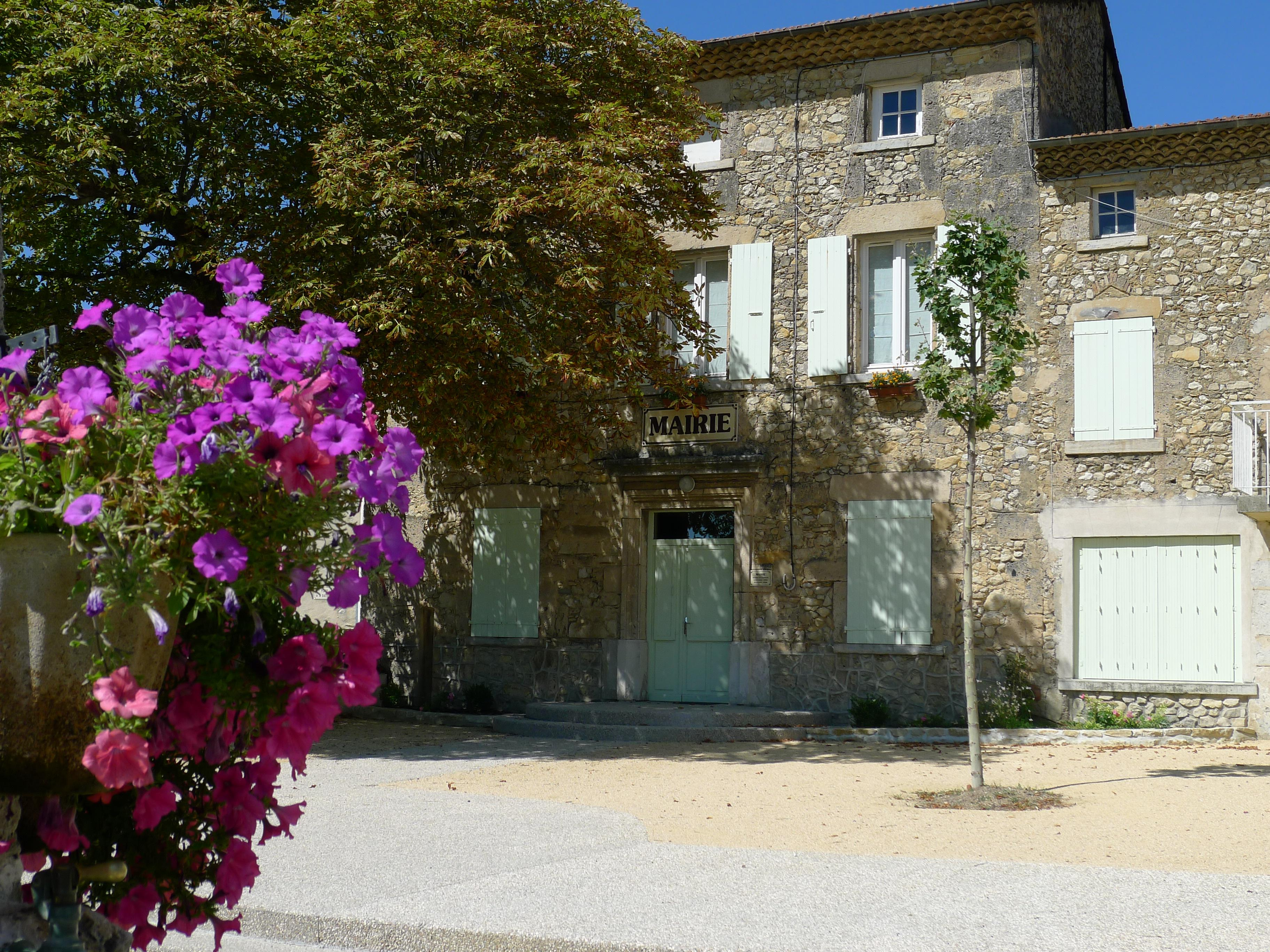
- Town hall
- Location of Châteaudouble
- Location within France Location within Auvergne-Rhône-Alpes
- Coordinates: 44°54′01″N 5°05′46″E
- Country: France
- Region: Auvergne-Rhône-Alpes
- Department: Drôme
- Arrondissement: Valence
- Canton: Crest
- Intercommunality: CA Valence Romans Agglo

Government
  - Mayor (2020–2026): François Bellier
- Area^{1}: 17.37 km^{2} (6.71 sq mi)
- Elevation: 380 m (1,250 ft)
- Highest elevation: 1,102 m (3,615 ft)
- Lowest elevation: 270 m (890 ft)
- Population (2023): 633
  - Density: 36.4/km^{2} (94.4/sq mi)
- Time zone: UTC+01:00 (CET)
  - Summer (DST): UTC+02:00 (CEST)
- INSEE/Postal code: 26081 /26120
- ^{1} French Land Register data, which excludes lakes, ponds, glaciers > 1 km^{2} (0.386 sq mi or 247 acres) and river estuaries.

Châteaudouble (French: [ʃɑtodubl]; Occitan: Chastèudoble) is a commune in the Drôme department in southeastern France. The engineer and sinologist Joseph Charignon was born in Châteaudouble.

== Population ==
Historical population
Year	Pop.	±% p.a.
1968	281	—
1975	304	+1.13%
1982	323	+0.87%
1990	414	+3.15%
1999	476	+1.56%
2007	534	+1.45%
2012	584	+1.81%
2017	578	−0.21%
2023	633	+1.53%
Source: INSEE

== See also ==
- Communes of the Drôme department
