= Bailu, Jiangsu =

Bailu 百禄镇
- Town
- Location in Jiangsu
- Coordinates: 34°3′33″N 119°31′29″E
- Country: People's Republic of China
- Province: Jiangsu
- Prefecture-level city: Lianyungang
- County: Guannan County
- Time zone: UTC+8 (China Standard)

Bailu (simplified Chinese: 百禄; traditional Chinese: 百祿; pinyin: Bǎilù) is a town under the administration of Guannan County, Jiangsu, China. As of 2018, it has 24 villages under its administration.
