= Guta Park =

Park in Beijing, China

- Type: Urban park
- Location: Beijing, China
- Area: 55.7 hectares (138 acres)
- Created: 2008
- Status: Open all year

Guta Park (simplified Chinese: 古塔公园; traditional Chinese: 古塔公園; lit. 'Ancient Pagoda Park') is one of the major city parks in the suburbs of Beijing. The park is located in southeastern Chaoyang District, and is one of the 15 earliest suburban public parks created by the Beijing government in 2008. In the park, there is a Buddhist pagoda which was constructed in 1538.

The park is divided into four sub-regions, and each of them has different landscapes. They are: the Lake region, the Hilly Garden region, the Pagoda region and the Western Gate region. There are about 200 species of plants in this park.
