= Chen Delin =

Chinese actor

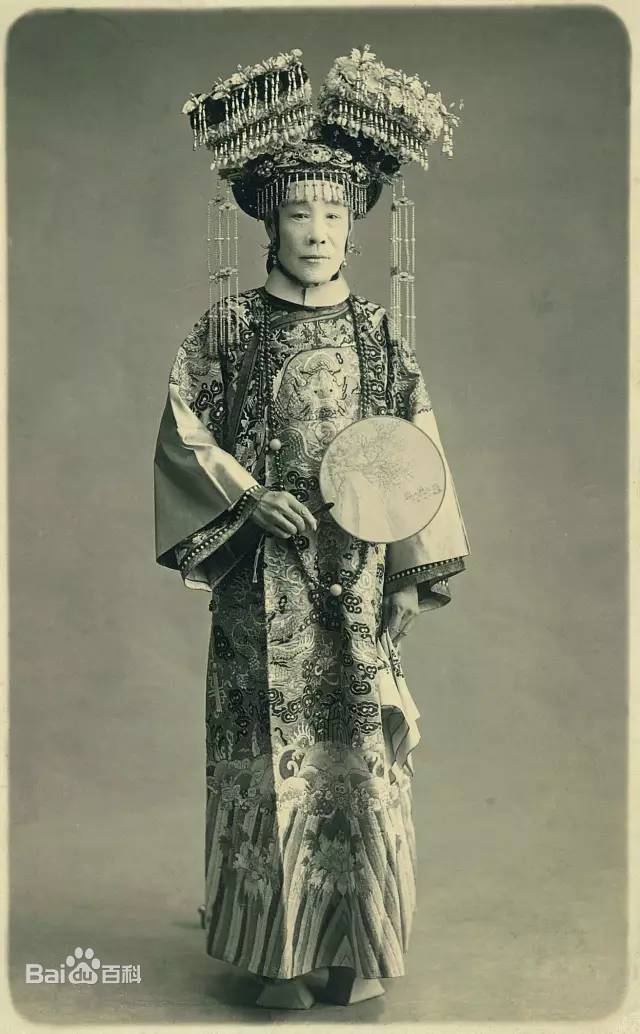
- Chen Delin as Queen Mother Xiao in Yanmen Pass (Note: Yànmén guān,《雁门关》.)
- Chinese: 陈德霖
Transcriptions
Standard Mandarin
- Hanyu Pinyin: Chén Délín
- Wade–Giles: Ch'en Te-lin

Chen Delin (Note: Chén Délín, 陈德霖) (October 27, 1862 – July 27, 1930) was an actor and a singer of both Peking and Kun opera. He was born in Huangxian County in Shandong Province. He played the role of qingyi, or virtuous adult female. His best-known roles were in the Peking Opera Blade of the Universe and the Kun Opera Yearning for Secular Life. Later, he taught at the Qingping Bureau.

Chen's father was a trader. Chen was sold to a theater company. His early work was in Kun Opera, which he learned from Zhu Lianfen. He learned female impersonation from Tian Baolin beginning in 1880.

In 1873, Chen joined the Quanfu Troupe, which played at Prince Gong's Mansion. This troupe was disbanded in 1887. He then organized the Chengping Troupe, later renamed the Fushou Troupe.

Chen won the favor of Dowager Empress Cixi by helping her revise the play The Hero's Hymn of a Glorious Epoch. (Note: Zhāodài xiāo sháo, 《昭代萧韶》.) He adapted the writing and set the lyrics to music. Later, he worked at various palaces and learned Cixi's mannerisms. He used these in the play Yanmen Pass, which the empress expressed her appreciation for.

Huang Guiqiu, Han Shichang, Jiang Miaoxiang, Wang Qinnong, Wang Huifang, Wang Yaoqing, Shang Xiaoyun, Mei Lanfang, and Yao Yufu were all students of Chen.

Chen's style of singing inspired a "Yellow School" of imitators. Chen had a sweet voice and clear articulation. Each note was distinguished. Although it was once popular in South, this style is no longer taught. It can still be heard on old recordings.

Chen, Wang Yaoqing (1881–1954), Mei Lanfang (1894–1961), and Zhang Junqiu (1920–1997) have been described as succeeding generations of qingyi masters. Qingyi is the most prestigious role in Peking Opera. Chen was considered the best singer of the group, but his look was not beautiful or convincingly female. Subsequent generations of opera goers would not have accepted him.
