= Yongxin County =

Yongxin County 永新县 Yungsin
- County
- Location of Yongxin County (red) within Ji'an City (gold) and Jiangxi
- Coordinates: 26°57′N 114°14′E
- Country: People's Republic of China
- Province: Jiangxi
- Prefecture-level city: Ji'an
- Founded in: 204 CE（东汉建安九年）
- Founder: Zhou Yu（周瑜）
- Seat: Hechuan Town

Government
  - CPC Secretary: Zheng Jun Ping (郑军平)
  - Mayor: Gu Qiu Yun (古秋云)

Area
  - Total: 2,195 km^{2} (847 sq mi)
  - Water: 82.5824 km^{2} (31.8852 sq mi) 3.76%
  - Rank: 6th in Ji'an (8.7% of Ji'an)
- Highest elevation (Qiushan Mountain): 1,391.3 m (4,565 ft)

Population (2021)data from the Seventh National Population Census of the People's Republic of China
  - Total: 393,984
  - Rank: 6th in Ji'an (8.8% of Ji'an)
  - Density: 179.5/km^{2} (464.9/sq mi)
- Time zone: UTC+8 (China Standard)
- Postal code: 343400
- Telephone numbers in China: 0796
- ID card code: 360830
- Website: www.yongxin.gov.cn

Yongxin County (simplified Chinese: 永新县; traditional Chinese: 永新縣; pinyin: Yǒngxīn Xiàn) is a county in the west of Jiangxi province, People's Republic of China, bordering Hunan province to the west. It is located within the Jinggang Mountains under the jurisdiction of the prefecture-level city of Ji'an. The county was built in the ninth year of Jian'an in the Eastern Han dynasty that is, in 204 AD. The name of the county was derived from Great Learning in the meaning of "the sun (日) is forever (永) and the moon (月) is new (新)".

One of the villages in Yongxin, Sanwan Town, is known for the creation of the 1st regiment of the Chinese Red Army led by Mao Zedong with 1,000 soldiers that fled the Kuomintang after the failed Autumn Harvest Uprising in 1927.

== Demographics ==
At the end of 2021, the "Hukou" population (Chinese: 户籍人口) of Yongxin County was 523,683, a decrease of 1,478 from the end of the previous year. According to the data of the Seventh National Population Census in 2020, the total resident population (Chinese: 常住人口) of the county was 393,984 (excluding active-duty soldiers of the People's Liberation Army, residents of Hong Kong, Macao and Taiwan and foreigners living in the district). Compared with the 475,580 people in the Sixth National Population Census, a total of 81,596 people has decreased in ten years, a decrease of 17.16%. In 2021, the birth rate of Yongxin County was 5.47‰, the death rate was 0.55‰, and the natural growth rate was 4.92‰.

== Geography ==
=== Overview ===
The landforms of the whole territory are dominated by mountains and hills. The terrain is high in the north and south and low in the middle, and slopes from the north and south sides to the middle. The highest peak in the whole territory is Qiushan Mountain, which is 1391 meters above sea level. The county's forest coverage rate is 70.8%.

=== Hydrology ===
The streams all merge into Heshui River (a tributary of the Gan River).

=== Climate ===
The climate of the district is Humid subtropical climate, with long hot summers and mild winters. The annual average temperature is 18.2 °C, the annual average sunshine is 1756.9 hours, the annual average frost-free period is 283 days, and the annual average rainfall is 1530.7 mm.

Climate data for Yongxin, elevation 153 m (502 ft), (1991–2020 normals, extremes 1981–2010)
Month	Jan	Feb	Mar	Apr	May	Jun	Jul	Aug	Sep	Oct	Nov	Dec	Year
Record high °C (°F)	24.9 (76.8)	32.1 (89.8)	36.2 (97.2)	36.4 (97.5)	37.3 (99.1)	38.0 (100.4)	40.6 (105.1)	40.6 (105.1)	38.7 (101.7)	36.1 (97.0)	33.7 (92.7)	26.2 (79.2)	40.6 (105.1)
Mean daily maximum °C (°F)	10.6 (51.1)	13.6 (56.5)	17.3 (63.1)	23.9 (75.0)	28.2 (82.8)	31.0 (87.8)	34.4 (93.9)	33.7 (92.7)	30.0 (86.0)	25.3 (77.5)	19.4 (66.9)	13.4 (56.1)	23.4 (74.1)
Daily mean °C (°F)	6.6 (43.9)	9.1 (48.4)	12.6 (54.7)	18.6 (65.5)	22.9 (73.2)	26.0 (78.8)	28.6 (83.5)	27.9 (82.2)	24.6 (76.3)	19.7 (67.5)	14.0 (57.2)	8.4 (47.1)	18.3 (64.9)
Mean daily minimum °C (°F)	3.7 (38.7)	6.0 (42.8)	9.4 (48.9)	14.8 (58.6)	19.2 (66.6)	22.6 (72.7)	24.3 (75.7)	24.0 (75.2)	20.9 (69.6)	15.6 (60.1)	10.1 (50.2)	4.9 (40.8)	14.6 (58.3)
Record low °C (°F)	−5.7 (21.7)	−3.5 (25.7)	−1.5 (29.3)	2.2 (36.0)	9.0 (48.2)	13.6 (56.5)	17.8 (64.0)	18.6 (65.5)	12.7 (54.9)	4.3 (39.7)	−1.3 (29.7)	−7.2 (19.0)	−7.2 (19.0)
Average precipitation mm (inches)	78.0 (3.07)	88.5 (3.48)	183.7 (7.23)	197.6 (7.78)	216.3 (8.52)	234.9 (9.25)	138.4 (5.45)	156.5 (6.16)	91.0 (3.58)	64.7 (2.55)	85.7 (3.37)	58.1 (2.29)	1,593.4 (62.73)
Average precipitation days (≥ 0.1 mm)	14.3	14.0	19.2	17.8	18.0	16.9	13.4	14.3	10.5	8.3	10.7	11.0	168.4
Average snowy days	2.3	1.3	0.4	0	0	0	0	0	0	0	0	0.6	4.6
Average relative humidity (%)	82	82	84	83	83	85	79	80	81	78	81	79	81
Mean monthly sunshine hours	65.7	66.6	70.0	100.3	123.5	126.7	204.0	187.3	148.9	137.9	115.0	106.1	1,452
Percentage possible sunshine	20	21	19	26	30	31	48	47	41	39	36	33	33
Source: China Meteorological Administration

== Administrative divisions ==
At present, Yongxin County has 1 subdistrict, 10 towns and 13 townships. The seat of the county locates at the Hechuan Town (禾川镇).

=== 1 subdistrict ===
- Sanyueping (三月坪街道)

=== 10 towns ===
- Hechuan (禾川镇)
- Shiqiao (石桥镇)
- Longyuankou (龙源口镇)
- Litian (澧田镇)
- Longmen (龙门镇)
- Shashi (沙市镇)
- Wenzhu (文竹镇)
- Buqian (埠前镇)
- Huaizhong (怀忠镇)
- Gaoqiaolou (高桥楼镇)

=== 13 townships ===
- Aonan (坳南乡)
- Qvbai (曲白乡)
- Caifeng (才丰乡)
- Yan'ge (烟阁乡)
- Zaizhong (在中乡)
- Sanwan (三湾乡)
- Tailing (台岭乡)
- Longtian (龙田乡)
- Gaoxi (高溪乡)
- Lianzhou (莲洲乡)
- Gaoshi (高市乡)
- Xiangxing (象形乡)
- Luxi (芦溪乡)
