= He Changgong =

Chinese general

- 何长工
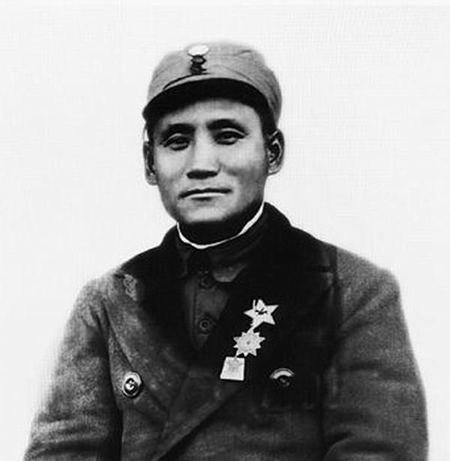

Vice Chairperson of the National Committee of the Chinese People's Political Consultative Conference
- In office September 1980 – June 1983

Personal details
- Born: 何坤; 27 January 1901 Huarong, Hunan, Qing China
- Died: 29 December 1987 (aged 86) Beijing, China
- Party: Chinese Communist Party (1922–1987)
- Spouse(s): Yin Qingping; Meng Shuya
- Children: 4
- Education: Anti-Japanese Military and Political University

Military service
- Allegiance: China
- Branch/service: Chinese Workers' and Peasants' Red Army; Eighth Route Army; People's Liberation Army
- Years of service: 1927–1949; 1975-1980

Chinese name
- Simplified Chinese: 何长工
Transcriptions
Standard Mandarin
- Hanyu Pinyin: Hé Chánggōng

He Changgong (Chinese: 何长工; January 27, 1901 – December 29, 1987) was a Chinese male politician, who served as the vice chairperson of the Chinese People's Political Consultative Conference. He joined the Chinese Communist Party (CCP) in France in 1922, took part in the Autumn Harvest Uprising and the Long March. In 1980, he was elected a vice chairman of the Chinese People's Political Consultative Conference (CPPCC).

He commanded the Red 8th Army and the Guangdong–Jiangxi Military Region, and served as political commissar of the Red 9th Army Group. During the Second Sino-Japanese War, he was vice-president of the Counter-Japanese Military and Political University, and after the war he founded military schools and armaments industries in Manchuria. After 1949, he was acting Minister of Heavy Industry and then vice minister and party secretary of the Ministry of Geology. He was persecuted during the Cultural Revolution and later returned to senior military education posts.

== Early life ==
He was born He Kun on 27 January 1901 in Dashan village in Huarong County, Hunan. In 1918, after finishing middle school, he went to Changxindian near Beijing to work and study. He took part in the May Fourth Movement in 1919 and went to France at the end of that year as part of the work-study movement. He joined the CCP in France in 1922 and went to work in Belgium the following year.

In 1924, He returned to Changsha, where he met Mao Zedong, then secretary of the CCP's Xiang District Committee, and on Mao's advice he went back to Huarong to establish a party organisation there. He later served as principal of the county's Xinhua Middle School, commander-in-chief of the county peasant self-defence army, and a member of the standing committee and head of the military department of the CCP's Nanhua Prefectural Committee. After the Mari Incident in Changsha on 21 May 1927, he was declared a wanted man and fled to Wuhan, where, on Mao's suggestion, he changed his name to He Changgong. He then joined the guard regiment of the headquarters of the National Revolutionary Army's 2nd Front Army as a company party representative.

== Red Army career ==
=== Jinggangshan ===
In September 1927, He took part in the Autumn Harvest Uprising led by Mao Zedong. Mao then sent him to Shaoguan to find the forces of Zhu De. Mao also sent him to negotiate with Wang Zuo and Yuan Wencai, leaders of local armed groups in the Jinggang Mountains, and He succeeded in bringing the Red Army into the mountains and later took charge of reorganising Wang's and Yuan's forces. In April 1928, after Zhu De's forces joined Mao's at Jinggangshan to form the Red 4th Army, He became party representative of its 32nd Regiment.

In January 1929, when the Red 4th Army marched into southern Jiangxi, He stayed behind with the Red Guards to wage guerrilla warfare on Jinggangshan. After Peng Dehuai's forces returned to the area, He became party representative of the 5th Column of the Red 5th Army and helped to establish the southeastern Hubei base area.

=== Commander and commissar ===
In 1930, He attended the National Conference of Soviet Areas and the Conference of Red Army Representatives in Shanghai. In May that year, he was promoted to commander of the Red 8th Army, joined the front committee of the Red 1st Front Army and took part in the attack on Changsha. In March 1932, he became political commissar of the 13th Army of the Red 5th Army Group and was responsible for reorganising the troops of the Ningdu uprising. He then led his forces east and took part in the Zhangzhou campaign. In October 1933, he became president and political commissar of the Red Army University. In January 1934, he was elected to the Central Executive Committee of the Chinese Soviet Republic. In February 1934, he became commander and political commissar of the Guangdong–Jiangxi Military Region and took part in resisting the fifth encirclement campaign.

=== Long March ===
In September 1934, on the eve of the Long March, He and Pan Hannian acted as secret envoys in negotiations with the Guangdong warlord Chen Jitang, reaching a non-aggression agreement that reduced the Red Army's losses. After the Zunyi Conference, he became political commissar of the Red 9th Army Group. On 27 March 1935, he and Luo Binghui were ordered to lead the 9th Army Group away from the main force in a diversionary manoeuvre to draw off pursuing troops. After achieving its aim, the army group operated independently for 52 days in the border areas of Guizhou, Sichuan and Yunnan, covering more than 1,000 km (620 mi), before rejoining the main force near Xichang.

When the Red Army split in September 1935, He went south with the Fourth Front Army. After Zhang Guotao set up a rival party centre, He joined in attacks on Mao and was named an alternate member of the Politburo and head of the Organisation Department by Zhang. He later served as chairman of the Gansu Provincial Soviet Government. In January 1937, he enrolled at the Counter-Japanese Military and Political University.

== Second Sino-Japanese War and second-half of the Chinese Civil War ==
After the outbreak of the Second Sino-Japanese War, He served as commander and political commissar of the Yanchang–Yanchuan river defence. In 1939, he became president of the 1st Branch of the Counter-Japanese Military and Political University and led 3,000 people east across the Yellow River to establish the school behind enemy lines in south-eastern Shanxi. He was later transferred to the university's headquarters as director of education. In 1943, he returned to northern Shaanxi as vice-president of the university, where he focused on training military cadres and took part in the rectification campaign and the Great Production Movement. In July 1944, when the university's president, Xu Xiangqian, fell seriously ill, He took charge of its headquarters.

In October 1945, He led the university's headquarters to the northeast, where he founded the Northeast Military and Political University and four branch schools and served as its acting president. Soon afterwards, he was also made commander of the Tonghua Military District. He also founded aviation, engineering, tank and medical schools. From 1947, he headed the military industry department of the Northeast Military Region, and he was sent to Manzhouli to take over Japanese equipment, establish an armaments industry and organise weapons research and production.

== People's Republic of China ==
After the founding of the People's Republic of China in 1949, He became vice minister and then acting minister of the Ministry of Heavy Industry of the Central People's Government. In July 1951, he also became head of its Aviation Industry Bureau. From 1952, he served for many years as vice minister and secretary of the party group of the Ministry of Geology. He emphasised the production of geological exploration equipment and instruments, and in 1954 the ministry completed the Zhangjiakou Exploration Machinery Plant. The ministry later established five exploration machinery plants in Hengyang, Shanghai, Beijing, Tianjin and Chongqing, three geological instrument factories in Beijing, Shanghai and Chongqing, and the Wuxi Drilling Tools Factory. In 1956, he oversaw the founding of the Chengdu College of Geology, now Chengdu University of Technology. He was persecuted during the Cultural Revolution.

After returning to work in 1975, He became vice-president of the PLA Military and Political University. In December 1977, he became vice-president of the PLA Military Academy. In September 1980, he was elected a vice chairman of the 5th National Committee of the CPPCC. In September 1982, he was elected to the standing committee of the Central Advisory Commission. He died in Beijing on 29 December 1987.

== Personal life ==
He's son, He Guangye, became president of the Asia Pacific Tourism Association. His grandson He Gang is a film investor. Another grandson, Wang Long, is a film director.
