= Orange Isle =

Island in Changsha, Hunan, China

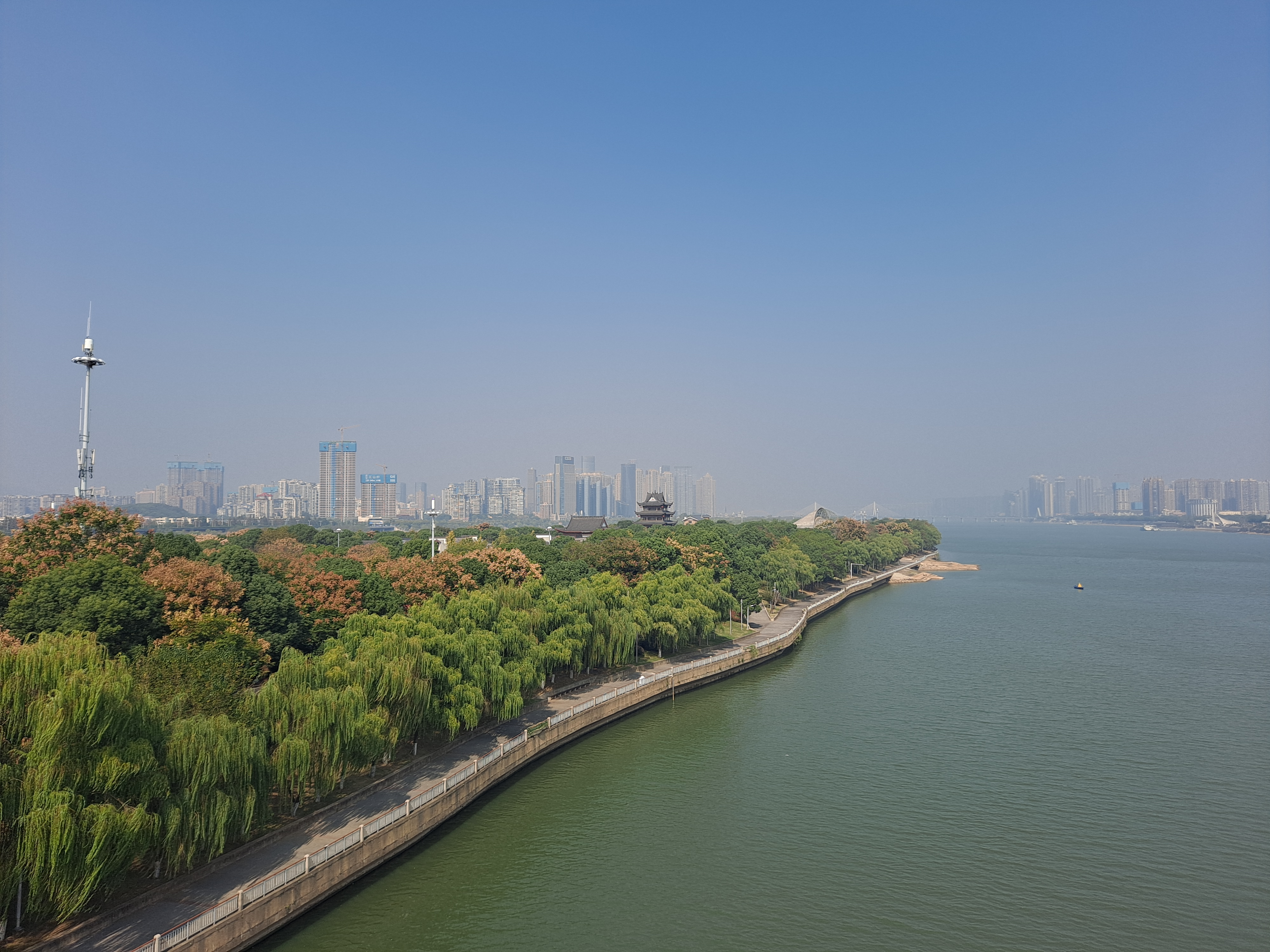
- Orange Isle in 2022

- Location within Hunan Location within China

Geography
- Location: Xiang River, Changsha, Hunan
- Coordinates: 28°11′03″N 112°57′41″E
- Area: 91.64 acres (37.09 ha)
- Length: 5 km (3.1 mi)
- Width: 40–140 m (130–460 ft)

Administration
- China

Demographics
- Population: 100 (administrators)
- Languages: Mandarin, Xiang
- Ethnic groups: Han Chinese

Additional information

Chinese name
- Simplified Chinese: 橘子洲
- Traditional Chinese: 橘子洲
Transcriptions
Standard Mandarin
- Hanyu Pinyin: Júzi Zhōu

Orange Isle (Chinese: 橘子洲; pinyin: Júzi Zhōu) is an isle in Xiang River, Changsha, Hunan, China. It also known by other names, such as Ju Isle (橘洲; Jú Zhōu) and Shuilu Isle (水陆洲; 水陸洲; Shuǐlù Zhōu; 'Water-and-land Isle'). It has a length of 5 kilometres (3.1 mi), a width of 40 to 140 metres (130 to 460 ft) and a total area of 370,900 square metres (91.64 acres). It was also a national AAAAA (5A) level tourist attraction and a national key scenic spot.

== History ==
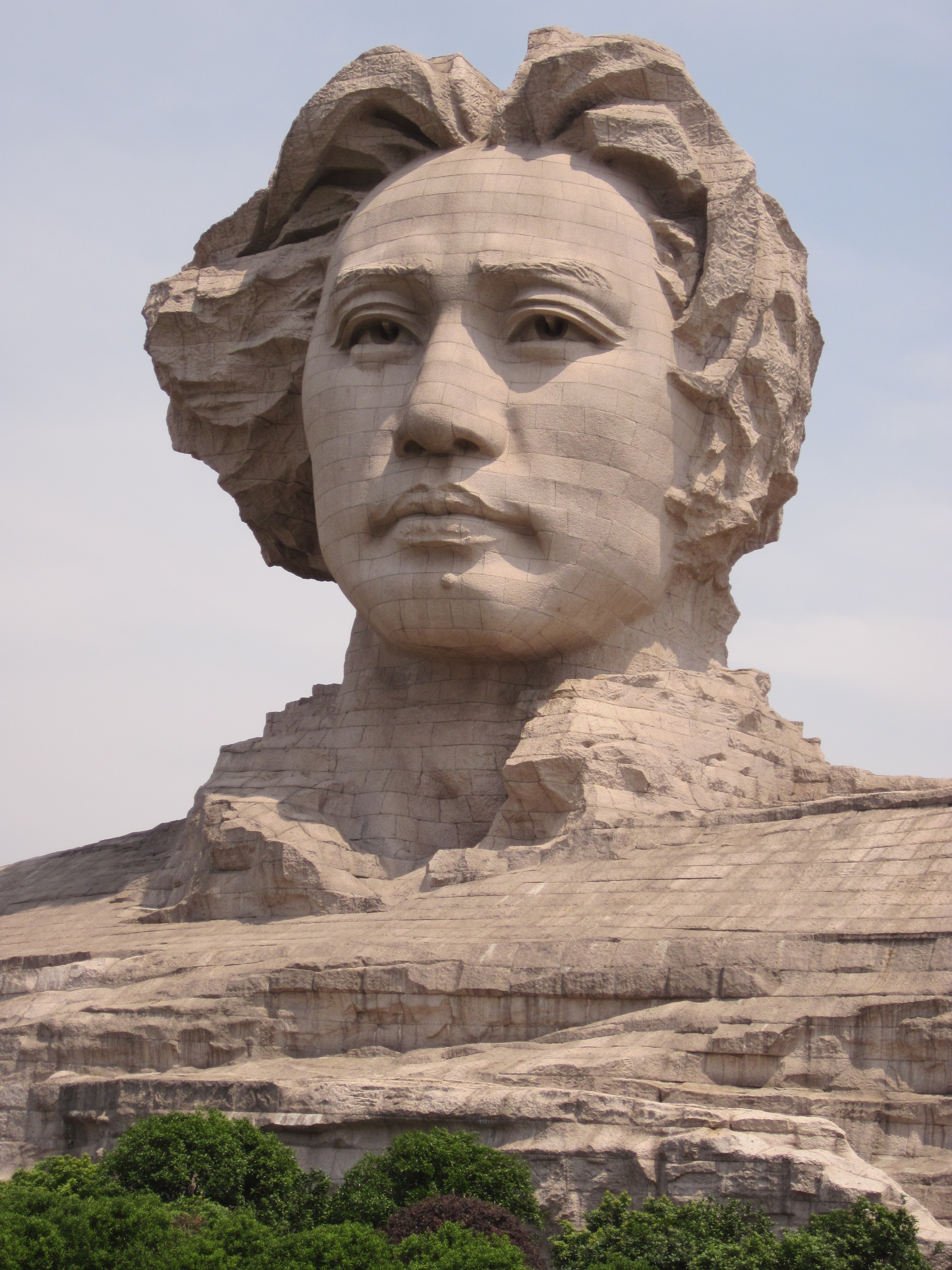
The Young Mao Zedong statue.

The first known instance of Orange Isle being documented appeared in 305 B.C., during the Yongxing era of the reign of Emperor Hui of Jin during the Jin Dynasty (266–420).

During the Tang dynasty (618–907), poet Du Fu wrote a poem Visiting Daolin Temple and Yuelushan Temple (岳麓山道林二寺行; 嶽麓山道林二寺行; yuè lù shān dào lín èr sì xíng), which mentioned Orange Isle. It had been on the list of The Eight Views of Xiaoxiang - River and Sky: Sunset Snow.

Orange Isle was opened in 1904, during the late Qing dynasty (1644–1911).

From 1911 to 1949, many foreign embassies and consulates were built on the isle.

During Mao Zedong's early years, he lived in Changsha. He and his friends He Shuheng, Xiao Zisheng, Cai Hesen, Xiao San and Xiang Jingyu would swim in the Xiang River.

Since the 2010s, the Orange Isle Music Festival has been hosted on the isle.

On 20 December 2009, the Youth Mao Zedong Statue was built on the isle.

== Attractions ==
- Hunan Culture Corridor
- On-water Amusement Corridor
- Orange Garden
- Garden of the Nature
- Park of Harmonious Guests
- Plaza of Shopping and Foods
- GYM Center
- Relaxation Resort
- Wildlife Park

== Gallery ==
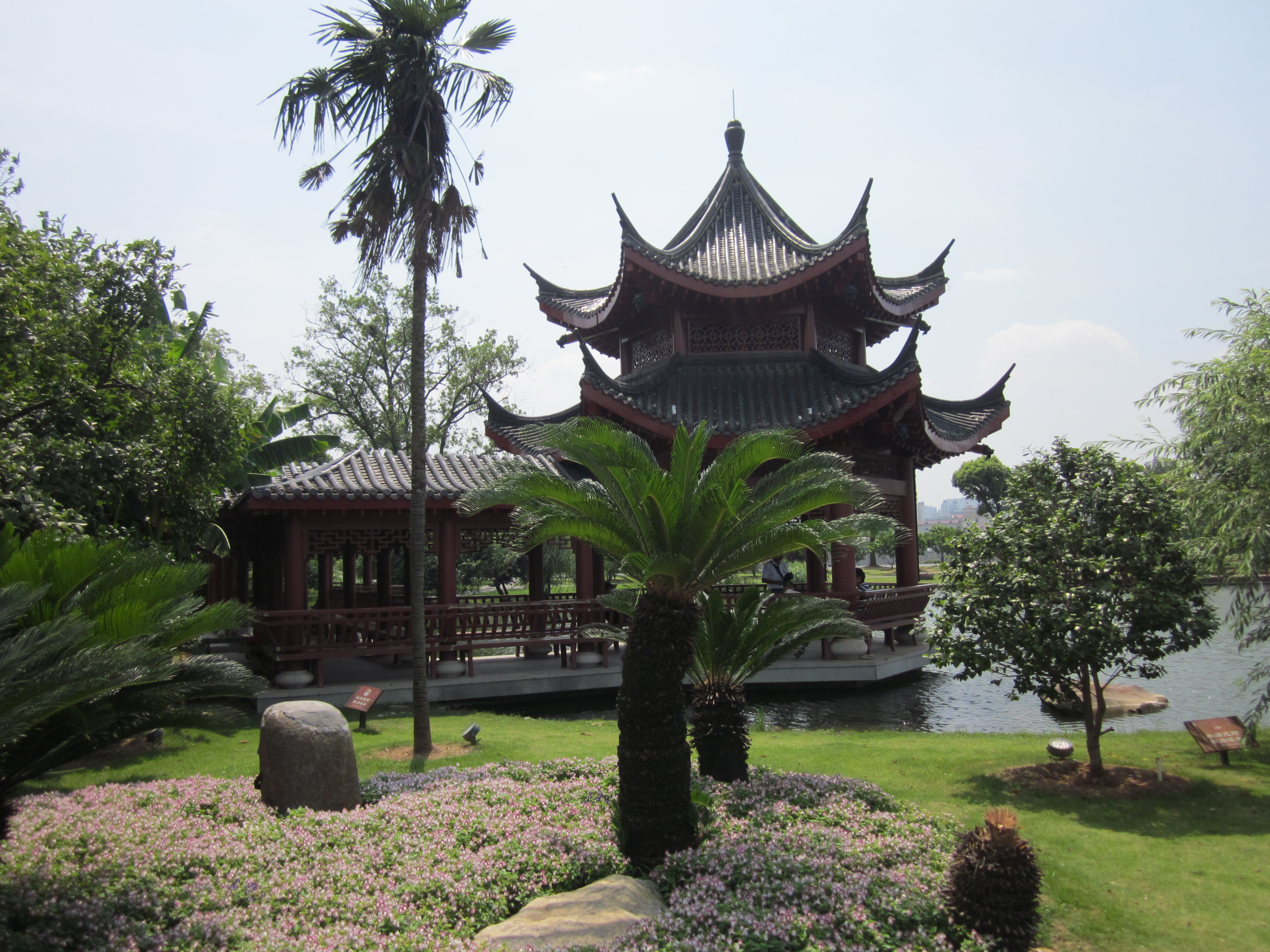
A pavilion

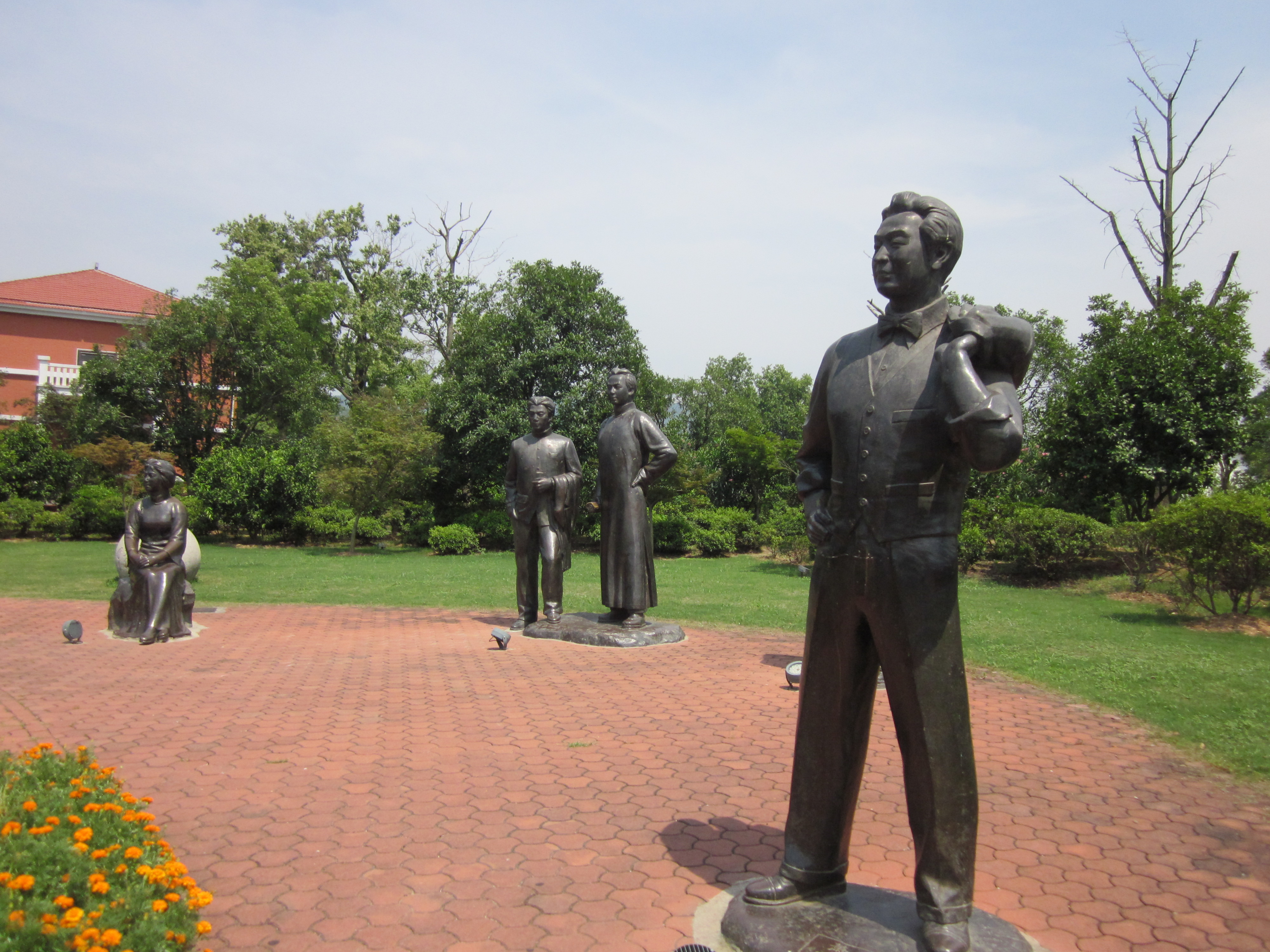
Statues of notable Hunan people

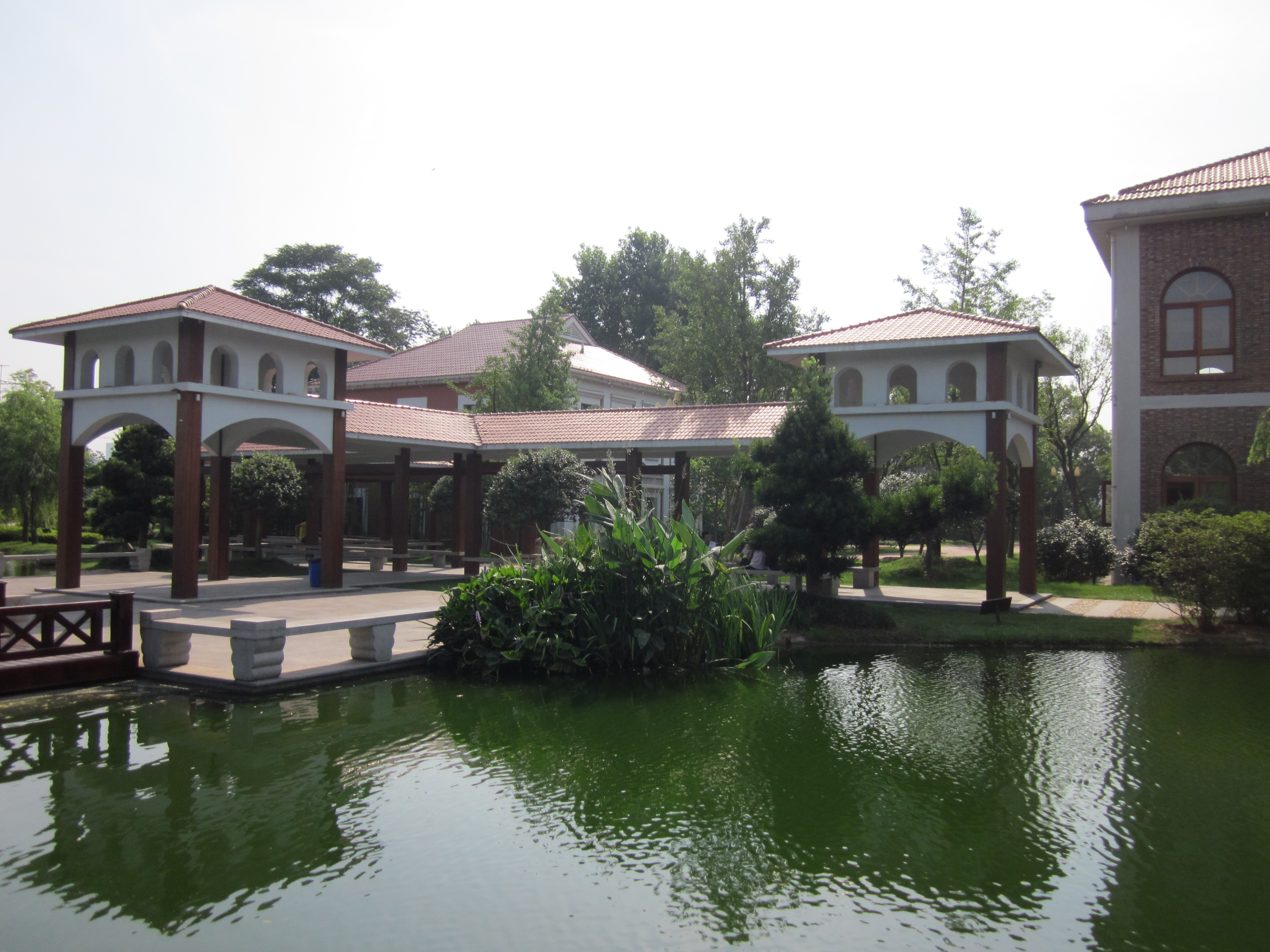

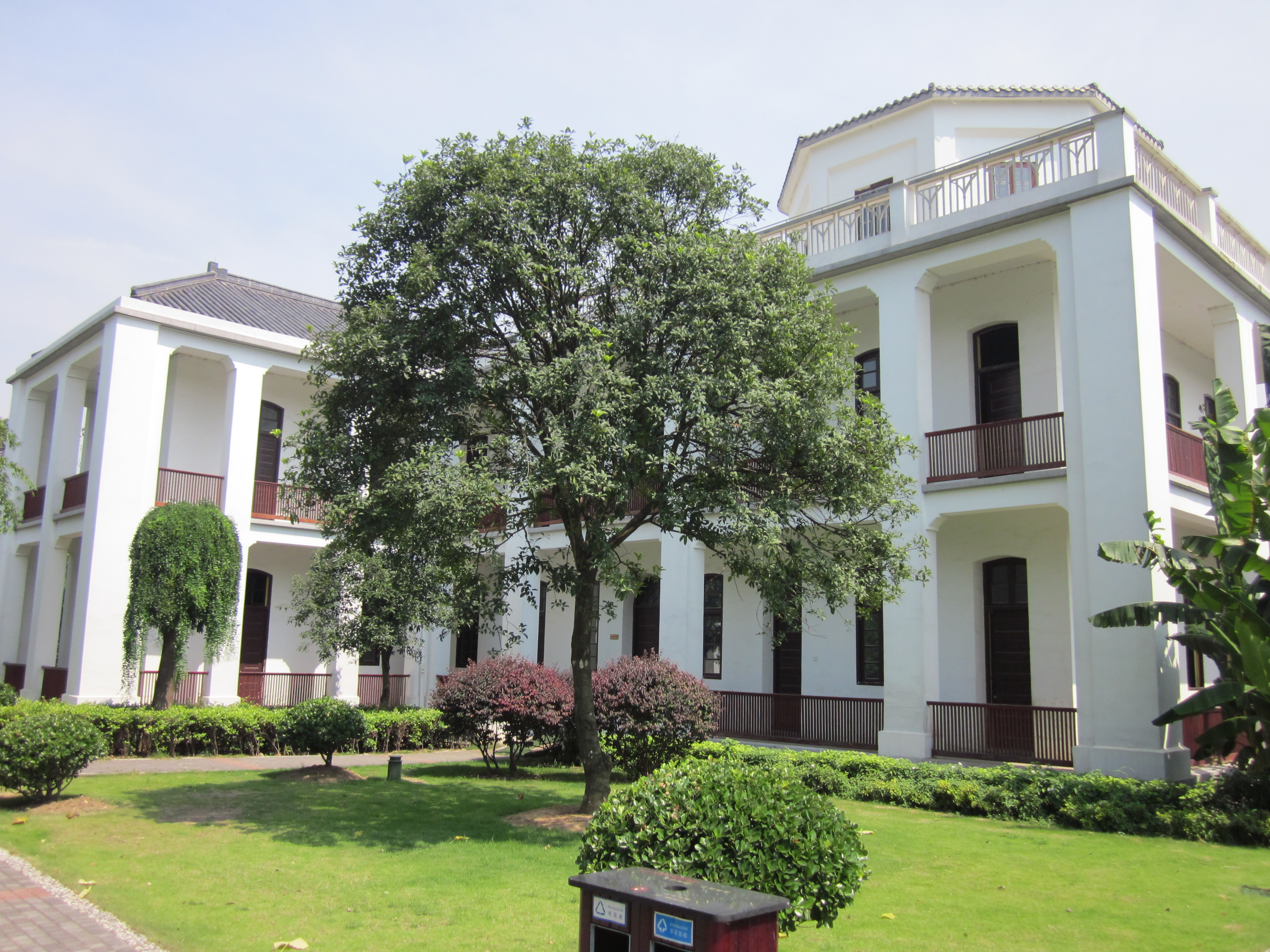

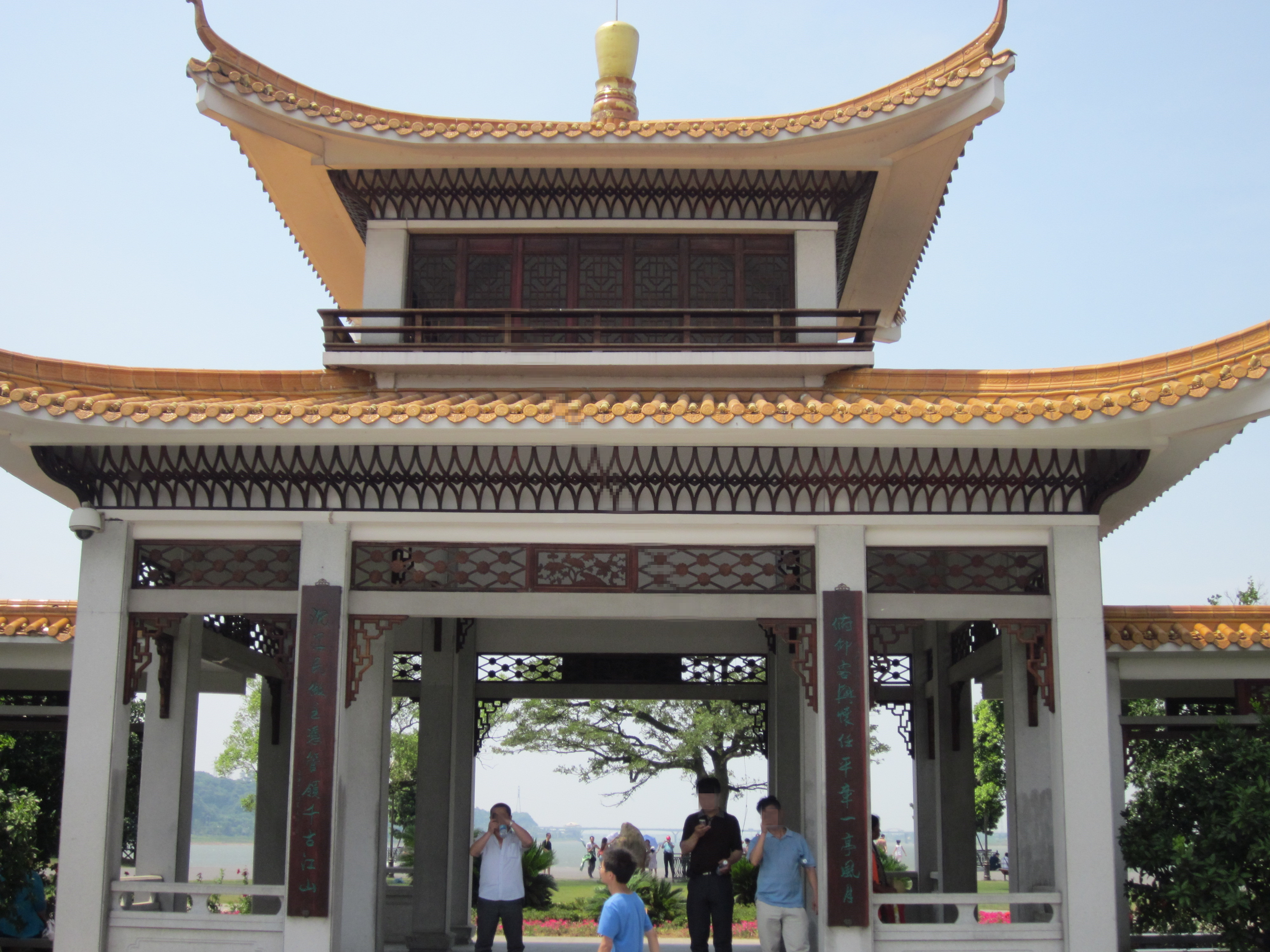
Wangjiang Pavilion

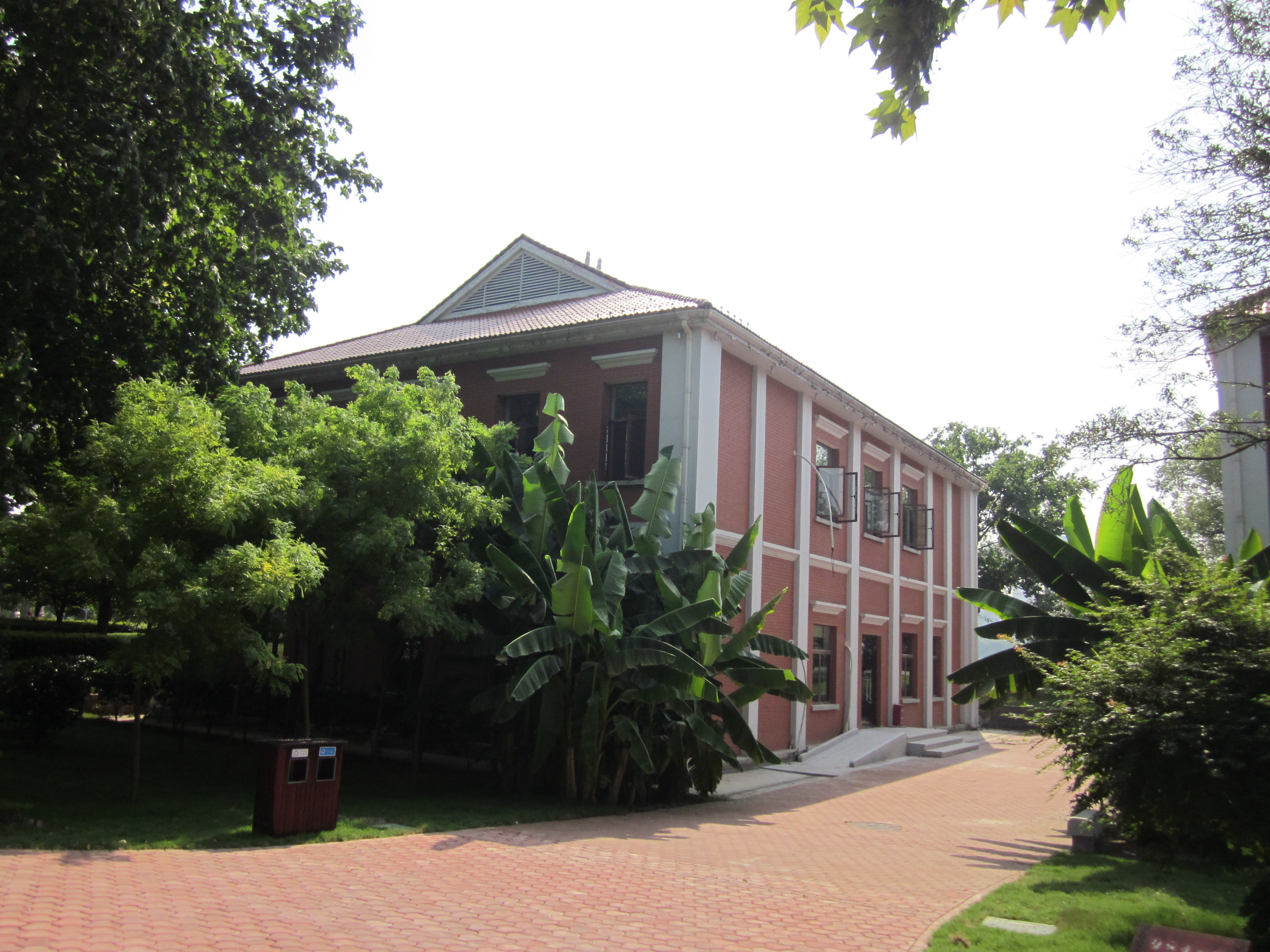

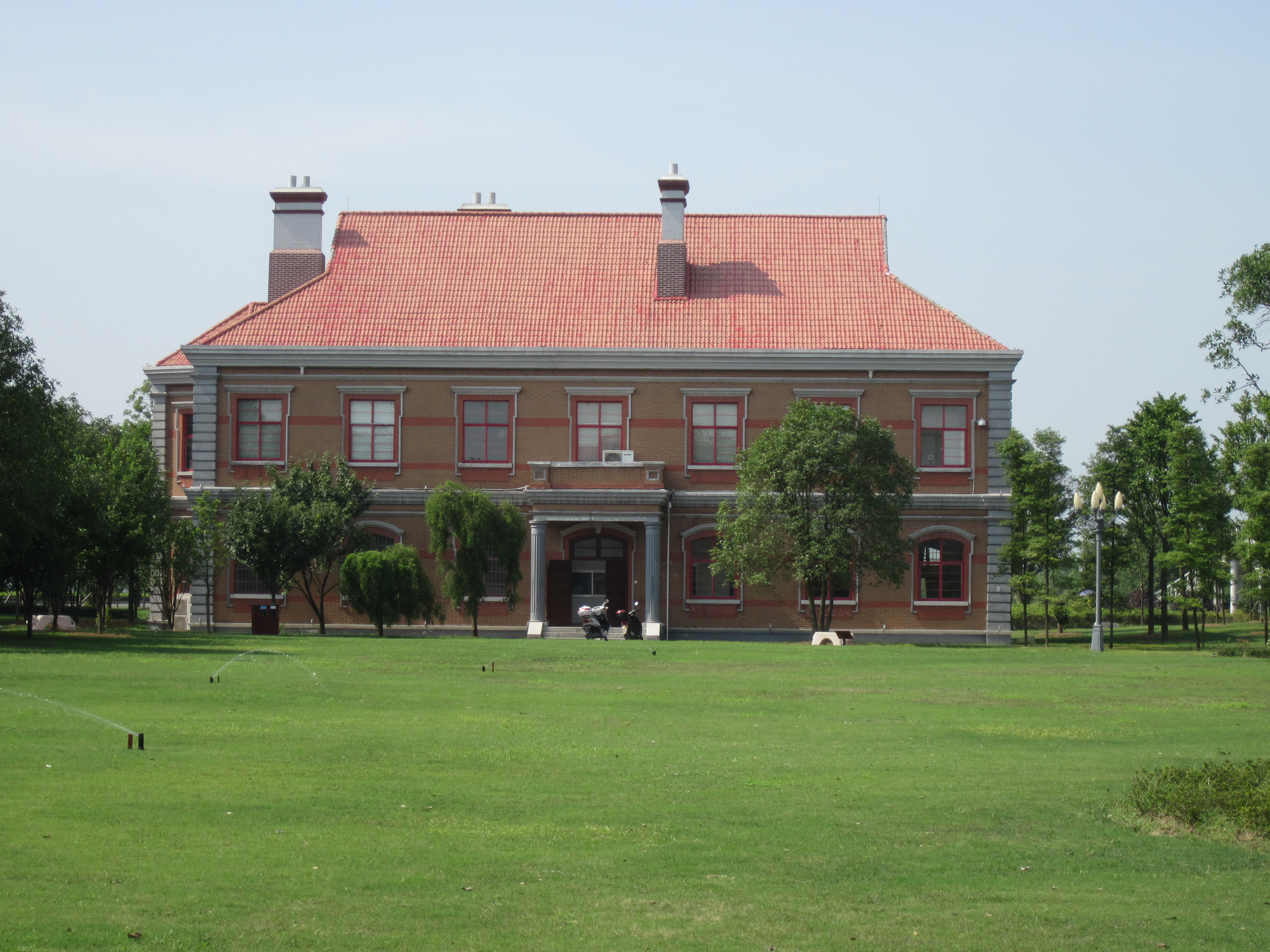

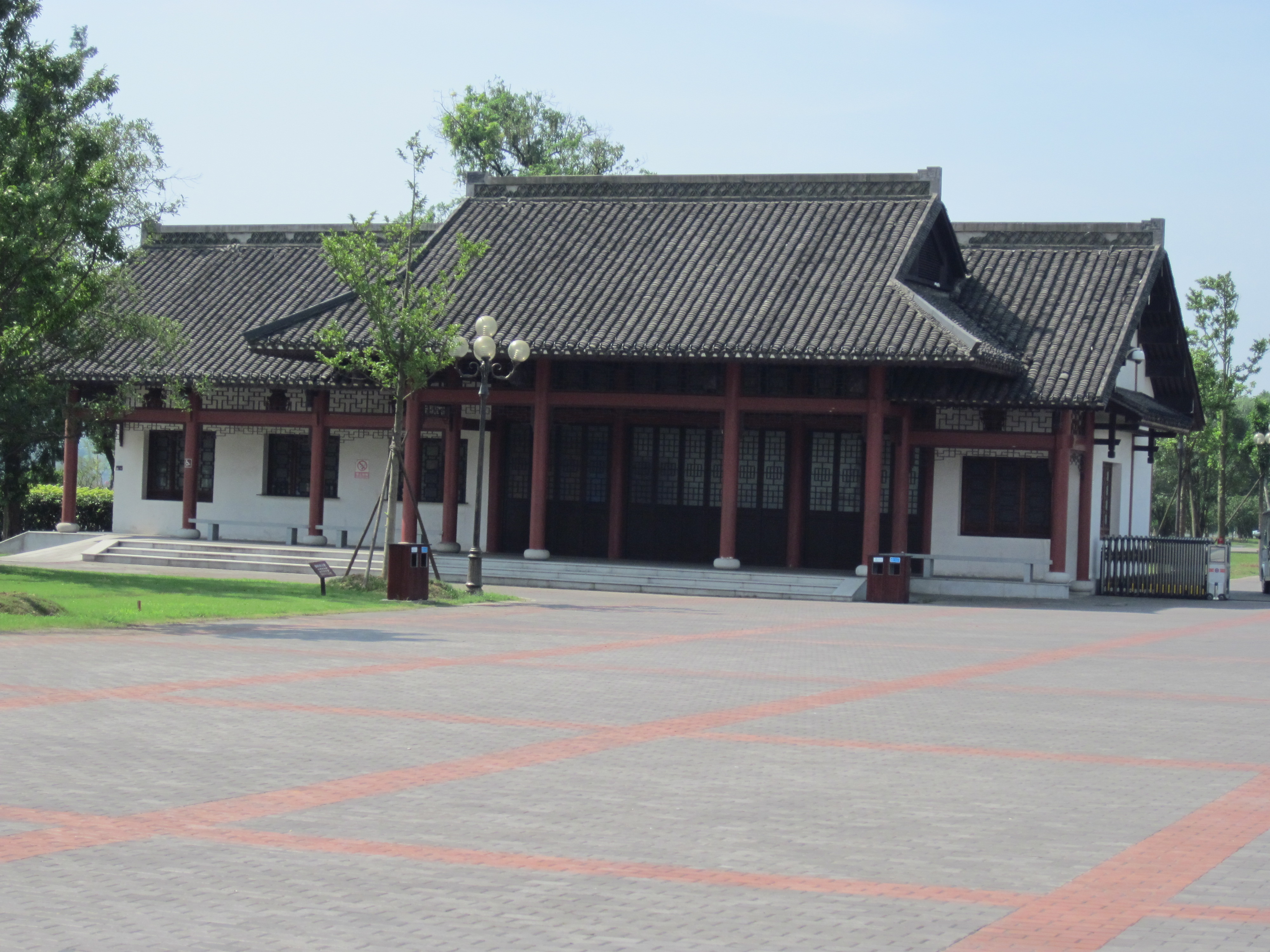

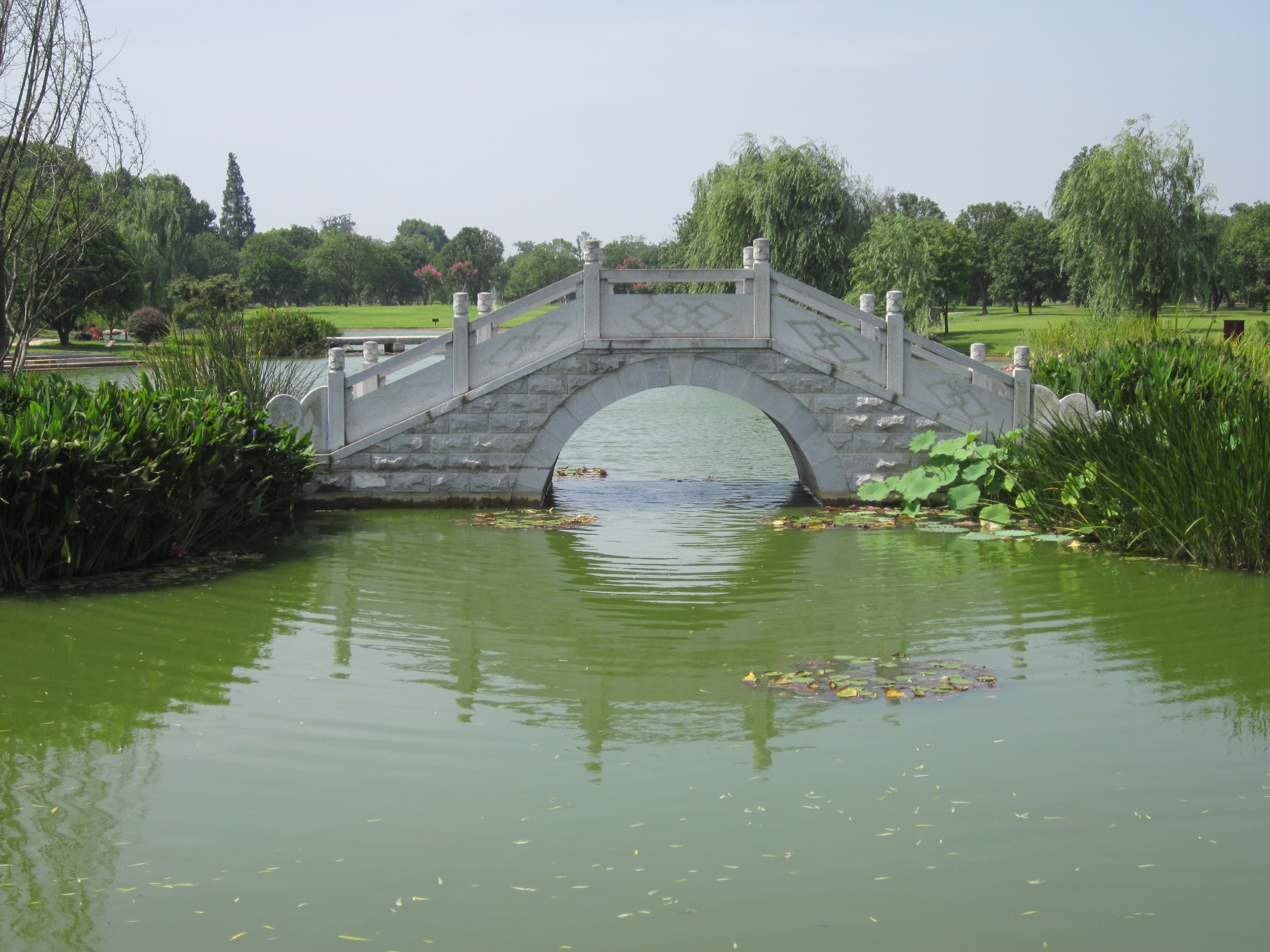

== Transportation ==
- Orange Isle Bridge, opened in 1972 as the first bridge crossing the Xiang River north of Hengyang, connects directly to the island's road network via two ramps, serving both eastbound and westbound traffic. Public access is restricted from 7:00 AM to 10:00 PM on weekends and national holidays.
- Juzizhou station on Changsha Metro's Line 2, opened in 2014, provides direct access to the park for pedestrians.
