= Qizi =

Qizi may refer to:

- Jizi, alternatively spelled Qizi
- Qizi, Xiangxiang, Hunan
- qızı, an Azerbaijani word meaning 'daughter of', notably used in Azerbaijani names

== See also ==
- Oghlu (disambiguation)
