= Ching Chung =

Ching Chung may refer to:

== Places ==
- Ching Chung Koon, a Taoist temple in Tuen Mun, Hong Kong
- Ching Chung stop, an MTR Light Rail stop adjacent to the temple

== People ==
- Hsu Ching-chung (1907–1996), Taiwanese politician and Vice Premier of the Republic of China from 1972 to 1981
- Liu Ching-chung, Taiwanese politician

== See also ==
- Chung Ching (born 1933), Hong Kong actor
