= Lishan, Xiangxiang =

Lishan Town 栗山镇
- Town
- Location in Hunan
- Coordinates: 27°37′32″N 112°24′17″E
- Country: People's Republic of China
- Province: Hunan
- Prefecture-level city: Xiangtan
- County-level city: Xiangxiang

Area
  - Total: 67.8 km^{2} (26.2 sq mi)

Population
  - Total: 27,100
  - Density: 400/km^{2} (1,040/sq mi)
- Time zone: UTC+8 (China Standard)
- Postal code: 411400
- Area code: 0732

Lishan Town (simplified Chinese: 栗山镇; traditional Chinese: 栗山鎮; pinyin: Lìshān Zhèn) is an urban town in Xiangxiang City, Hunan Province, People's Republic of China.

== Cityscape ==
The town is divided into 24 villages and one community, which include the following areas: Xishantang Community, Xishan Village, Xinhe Village, Huangjin Village, Hongfu Village, Changchong Village, Jiufeng Village, Xiangsi Village, Liangju Village, Yangmei Village, Jinyin Village, Dashun Village, Shuangjiang Village, Lishan Village, Xiashang Village, Emei Village, Shiqiao Village, Daqi Village, Jingquan Village, Jietou Village, Liangjiatang Village, Xinfeng Village, Yong'an Village, Baizhu Village, and Bajiang Village (西山塘社区、西山村、新合村、黄金村、洪芙村、长冲村、九峰村、相思村、粮桔村、杨梅村、金银村、大顺村、双江村、栗山村、峡上村、峨嵋村、石桥村、大旗村、荆泉村、界头村、两家塘村、新丰村、永安村、白竹村、巴江村).
