= Dongshan, Xiangxiang =

Dongshan Subdistrict 东山街道
- Subdistrict
- Location in Hunan
- Coordinates: 27°43′30″N 112°31′56″E
- Country: People's Republic of China
- Province: Hunan
- Prefecture-level city: Xiangtan
- County-level city: Xiangxiang

Area
  - Total: 3.98 km^{2} (1.54 sq mi)
- Time zone: UTC+8 (China Standard)
- Postal code: 411400
- Area code: 0731

Dongshan Subdistrict (simplified Chinese: 东山街道; traditional Chinese: 東山街道; pinyin: Dōngshān Jiēdào) is a subdistrict in Xiangxiang City, Hunan Province, People's Republic of China.

== Cityscape ==
The township is divided into 12 villages and three communities, which include the following areas: Qifeng Community, Shuyuanlu Community, Chengnan Community, Xiajin Village, Shuanglian Village, Shuangquan Village, Tazi Village, Donglin Village, Dongshan Village, Chengdong Village, Xin'an Village, Dong'an Village, Dongsheng Village, Dongtai Village, and Zhangjiang Village (起凤社区、书院路社区、城南社区、先进村、双涟村、双泉村、塔子村、东林村、东山村、城东村、新岸村、东岸村、东胜村、东台村、张江村).
