= Quantang, Xiangxiang =

Quantang Town 泉塘镇
- Town
- Location in Hunan
- Coordinates: 27°44′25″N 112°28′45″E
- Country: People's Republic of China
- Province: Hunan
- Prefecture-level city: Xiangtan
- County-level city: Xiangxiang

Area
  - Total: 49,700 km^{2} (19,200 sq mi)
- Time zone: UTC+8 (China Standard)
- Postal code: 411400
- Area code: 0732

Quantang Town (simplified Chinese: 泉塘镇; traditional Chinese: 泉塘鎮; pinyin: Quántáng Zhèn) is an urban town in Xiangxiang City, Hunan Province, People's Republic of China.

== Villages ==
The town is divided into 47 villages and one community, which include the following areas: Quantang Community, Fanyu, Lvtang, Qingshan, Qianchong, Tongsheng, Tongrui, Shahe, Xindong, Xinyang, Wangjia, Fanrong, Huawu, Nansou, Chuangtang, Xianhua, Baiquan, Quantang, Shuangli, Shan'ao, Shijiang, Dongling, Xiling, Xintian, Linchang, Xiongxin, Jinpin, Wu'ai, Biaoji, Gaowu, Desheng, Liangjia, Sanjiao, Tuotang, Xiawan, Shuangtuo, Xingyu, Xitai, Huawu, Niwan, Hushan, Tuonan, Longling, Juntang, Qiaowan, Shanghu, Shiwu, and Chenglian.
