= Eva Sandberg Xiao =

Soviet photographer

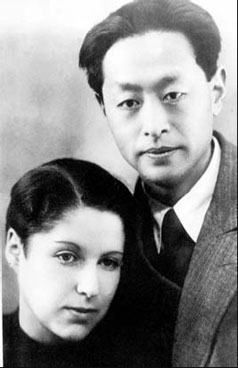
Xiao San and his wife Eva Siao (Eva Sandberg) in 1934

Eva Sandberg (November 8, 1911, in Breslau – November 29, 2001, in Beijing) was a German-born Soviet photographer. In Moscow she met and married the Chinese communist poet Xiao San. In 1939, after twelve years in Moscow, Xiao was ordered to the revolutionary base at Yan'an; Sandberg was allowed to accompany him. The conductor Herbert Sandberg was her brother.

== Only White Woman at Yan'an ==
The First Red Army and the Chinese Communist Party headquarters had been in northern Shaanxi for four years. Xiao, a Hunanese and an old classmate of Mao Zedong's, took over the editorial department at the Lu Xun Academy of Arts. Under the exacting conditions of the Second Sino-Japanese War Sandberg here bore Xiao two sons. She was the base's only resident western female although the reporter and spy Agnes Smedley was a visitor. After five years Sandberg returned to Moscow, taking her sons with her. After the Japanese surrender, the Chinese Civil War resumed. In March 1947 the Communists evacuated Yan'an and the National Revolutionary Army occupied it. Only in March 1949, with the leadership ensconced in a western suburb of Beijing, did Xiao board a train for Moscow with a delegation of writers; he was headed to Stockholm for committee work on the Geneva Conventions but very much looked forward to seeing his wife and children however briefly after four years.

== Only Three Soviet Women in China ==
Reunited, the Xiao family returned to China. The first five-year plan of the People's Republic brought large-scale modernization to the country, but collectivization resulted in famine; doubts raised among the aghast planners were met with the Hundred Flowers Campaign, the Anti-Rightist Movement and a plan for the years 1958-62 called the Great Leap Forward. In this climate even Xiao San, Mao's boyhood friend, dared not write any poetry; given his history the family could not long hope to avoid the regime's xenophobia, mounting even as Mao relinquished the State Chairmanship in 1959.

Eva Sandberg had laid aside her Leica and begun making films of the People's Republic for use by the communist news agencies of Europe. In 1962 it emerged that her travels in China had aroused suspicion. She came under pressure either to take Chinese citizenship or to leave the country. When her friend Nadia left Zhang Bao and returned to the Soviet Union, Sandberg knew there were only two other such prominent Soviet women remaining: Lisa Kishkin, wife of Li Lisan, a Lubianka survivor, and Grania (格拉娘), the uneducated wife of Chen Changhao (陈昌浩), a veteran of the alternate Long March of Zhang Guotao (purged 1937).

The simple Grania was put on trial, as a Revisionist and Capitalist roader. Chang promptly divorced her, losing his son Victor, and was the prosecution's witness. Sandberg and Kishkin spoke in her defense. The charge of spying menaced all three women but could not be made to stick. For a few years they imagined nothing worse might come to Grania than the penury to which she as a single, visible-minority mother was reduced, and which they tried to alleviate. However, in 1966 Liu, the official State Chair was outfoxed by his resurgent predecessor. The Cultural Revolution brought douzhenghui violence to bear against the three Soviet wives and the men who had married them. Each was charged with, and made to confess to, various crimes. The following year the three couples, including the divorced Grania and Zhang Bao, were formally arrested. Li died within days of his arrest, on June 22, 1967; the others were to spend years in a Beijing prison and then years in enforced rustication, a sort of internal exile.
