= Atatürk Mask =

Sculpture in İzmir, Turkey

- Atatürk Maskı
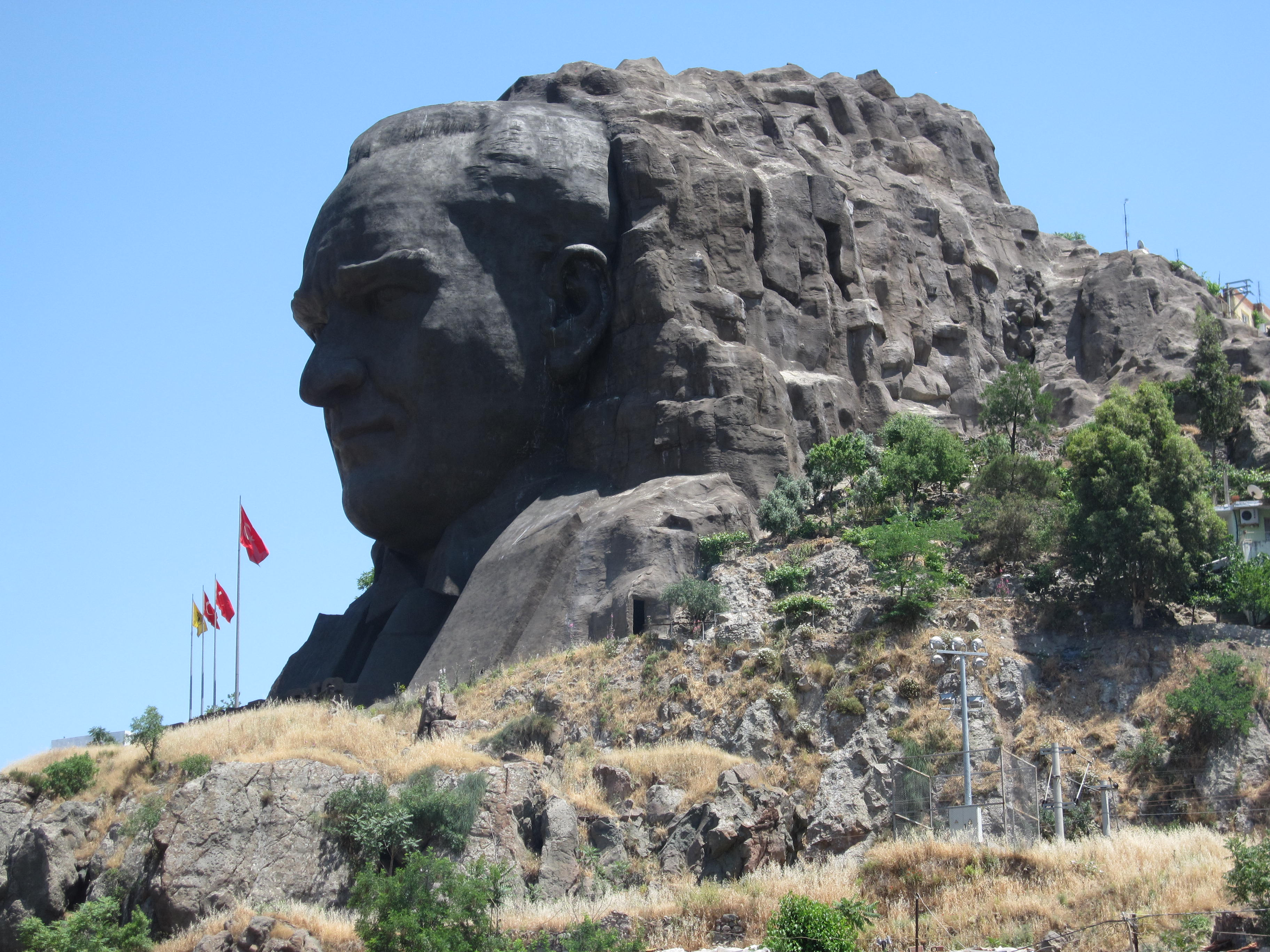
- Photo of the Mask
- Interactive map of Atatürk Mask
- Location: Buca, İzmir, Turkey
- Coordinates: 38°24′21.8″N 27°08′44.9″E
- Designer: Harun Atalayman
- Type: Sculpture
- Material: Concrete
- Height: 42 metres (138 ft)
- Beginning date: 2006
- Completion date: 2009
- Restored date: 2018
- Dedicated to: Mustafa Kemal Atatürk
- Cost: ₺4.2 million

The Atatürk Mask (Turkish: Atatürk Maskı) is a large concrete bust of Mustafa Kemal Atatürk, founder of modern Turkey, located in Buca district of İzmir. The sculpture was completed in 2009 at a cost of ₺4.2 million.

== History ==
Buca Municipality has agreed with sculptor Harun Atalayman to have a monument dedicated to Mustafa Kemal Atatürk built. The sculpture, the construction of which started in 2006, was completed in 2009 at a cost of ₺4.2 million. In September 2010, a museum called the Independence War and 9 September Museum was established within the sculpture for a brief of time. In 2018, after being damaged by weather and climate, help was asked from trained mountain climbers with the repairs, because a crane is not able to access some locations of the monument.

== Design ==
The Atatürk Mask, at 42 m (138 ft) high, is the highest relief sculpture in Turkey, and the tenth highest relief sculpture in the world. It is built up over a scaffolding and not carved into the side of the mountain. To be more specific, the monument is steel structure containing a space truss system. In the lower left corner of the sculpture, Atatürk's quote "Peace at Home, Peace in the World" and his signature are embossed.

== See also ==
- Mount Rushmore
- Young Mao Zedong statue
