= Meiqiao, Xiangxiang =

Meiqiao Town 梅桥镇
- Town
- Location in Hunan
- Coordinates: 27°39′06″N 112°31′53″E
- Country: People's Republic of China
- Province: Hunan
- Prefecture-level city: Xiangtan
- County-level city: Xiangxiang

Area
  - Total: 137.6 km^{2} (53.1 sq mi)

Population
  - Total: 50,900
  - Density: 370/km^{2} (958/sq mi)
- Time zone: UTC+8 (China Standard)
- Postal code: 411400
- Area code: 0732

Meiqiao Town (simplified Chinese: 梅桥镇; traditional Chinese: 梅橋鎮; pinyin: Méiqiáo Zhèn) is an urban town in Xiangxiang City, Hunan Province, People's Republic of China.

== Cityscape ==
The town is divided into 48 villages and one community, which include the following areas: Meiqiao Community, Bajiao Village, Jiangxia Village, Lixin Village, Gaogui Village, Chapei Village, Yongfu Village, Gaochang Village, Qilin Village, Hengpu Village, Shuitan Village, Huanglong Village, Fuhai Village, Shangfeng Village, Xiangxing Village, Wanquan Village, Xingming Village, Xincang Village, Tongfeng Village, Quanfu Village, Aotou Village, Jinji Village, Xianfeng Village, Quanjing Village, Tuqiao Village, Nitan Village, Huilong Village, Shuanghe Village, Husou Village, Yangliu Village, Longhu Village, Chayuan Village, Dongtang Village, Lugu Village, Lupen Village, Fenglong Village, Fengshou Village, Tongmu Village, Baohe Village, Xique Village, Xiashi Village, Shangning Village, Jiupu Village, Nongke Village, Longquan Village, Hengshan Village, Fengcheng Village, Bingfeng Village, and Meiqiao Village (梅桥社区、芭蕉村、江夏村、立新村、高枧村、茶佩村、永福村、高长村、麒麟村、横铺村、水潭村、黄龙村、福海村、上丰村、象形村、万全村、星明村、新仓村、同丰村、泉福村、坳头村、金吉村、先锋村、泉井村、土桥村、泥滩村、回龙村、双河村、胡薮村、杨柳村、龙湖村、茶园村、东塘村、鹿古村、炉盆村、丰隆村、丰收村、桐木村、保合村、喜鹊村、硖石村、上凝村、酒铺村、农科村、龙泉村、衡山村、峰城村、井峰村、梅桥村).
