= Wangchunmen =

Wangchunmen Subdistrict 望春门街道
- Subdistrict
- Location in Hunan
- Coordinates: 27°44′33″N 112°31′43″E
- Country: People's Republic of China
- Province: Hunan
- Prefecture-level city: Xiangtan
- County-level city: Xiangxiang

Area
  - Total: 7.8 km^{2} (3.0 sq mi)

Population
  - Total: 38,000
  - Density: 4,900/km^{2} (13,000/sq mi)
- Time zone: UTC+8 (China Standard)
- Postal code: 411400
- Area code: 0732

Wangchunmen Subdistrict (simplified Chinese: 望春门街道; traditional Chinese: 望春門街道; pinyin: Wàngchūnmén Jiēdào) is a subdistrict in Xiangxiang City, Hunan Province, People's Republic of China.

== Cityscape ==
The township is divided into three villages and four communities, which include the following areas: Dongfeng Community, Wumenqian Community, Yunmensi Community, Sangzao Community, Chengbei Village, Jintang Village, and Lianmeng Village (东风社区、务门前社区、云门寺社区、桑枣社区、城北村、金塘村、联盟村).
