= Xinxianglu =

Xinxianglu Subdistrict 新湘路街道
- Subdistrict
- Location in Hunan
- Coordinates: 27°44′09″N 112°31′19″E
- Country: People's Republic of China
- Province: Hunan
- Prefecture-level city: Xiangtan
- County-level city: Xiangxiang

Area
  - Total: 20.03 km^{2} (7.73 sq mi)

Population
  - Total: 89,000
  - Density: 4,400/km^{2} (12,000/sq mi)
- Time zone: UTC+8 (China Standard)
- Postal code: 411400
- Area code: 0732

Xinxianglu Subdistrict (Chinese: 新湘路街道; pinyin: Xīnxiānglù Jiēdào) is a subdistrict in Xiangxiang City, Hunan Province, People's Republic of China.

== Cityscape ==
The township is divided into five villages and seven communities, which include the following areas: Beizhengjie Community, Honglun Community, Xingang Community, Xianglvzerenyouxiangongsi Community, Haotang Community, Meiping Community, Changqiao Community, Chengxi Village, Baituo Village, Xiangxiangchachang Village, Xiangxiangyuanyichang Village, and Xiangxiangxumuchang Village (北正街社区、红仑社区、新港社区、湖南湘铝有限责任公司社区、壕塘社区、梅坪社区、长桥社区、城西村、白托村、湘乡茶场村、湘乡园艺场村、湘乡畜牧场村).
