= Kunlunqiao =

Kunlunqiao Subdistrict 昆仑桥街道
- Subdistrict
- Location in Hunan
- Coordinates: 27°43′46″N 112°31′22″E
- Country: People's Republic of China
- Province: Hunan
- Prefecture-level city: Xiangtan
- County-level city: Xiangxiang

Population
  - Total: 38,140
- Time zone: UTC+8 (China Standard)
- Postal code: 411400
- Area code: 0732

Kunlunqiao Subdistrict (simplified Chinese: 昆仑桥街道; traditional Chinese: 昆侖橋街道; pinyin: Kūnlúnqiáo Jiēdào) is a subdistrict in Xiangxiang City, Hunan Province, People's Republic of China.

== Cityscape ==
The township is divided into five villages and seven communities, which include the following areas: Nanzhengjie Community, Kunlunqiao Community, Hutie Community, Nanjinlu Community, Xiangtanxianye Community, Ershisanzhiyigongsi Community, Hongxing Community, Xin'ao Village, Jiang'an Village, Yangjin Village, Lvnan Village, and Wuli Village (南正街社区、昆仑桥社区、湖铁社区、南津路社区、湘潭碱业社区、二十三冶一公司社区、红星社区、新坳村、江岸村、杨金村、铝南村、五里村).
