= Maotian, Xiangxiang =

Town in Hunan, China

Maotian Town 毛田镇
- Town
- Location in Hunan
- Coordinates: 27°40′54″N 112°06′50″E
- Country: People's Republic of China
- Province: Hunan
- Prefecture-level city: Xiangtan
- County-level city: Xiangxiang

Area
  - Total: 78 km^{2} (30 sq mi)

Population
  - Total: 21,480
  - Density: 280/km^{2} (710/sq mi)
- Time zone: UTC+8 (China Standard)
- Postal code: 411400
- Area code: 0732

Maotian Town (simplified Chinese: 毛田镇; traditional Chinese: 毛田鎮; pinyin: Máotián Zhèn) is an urban town in Xiangxiang City, Hunan Province, People's Republic of China.

== Cityscape ==
The town is divided into 45 villages and two communities, which include the following areas: Yongjiaqiao Community, Xinjie Community, Xinhua Village, Huatang Village, Maotian Village, Baiyang Village, Zhuyuan Village, Shishan Village, Qinjia Village, Xiale Village, Tanshan Village, Tanjia Village, Dapo Village, Daxin Village, Fenshui Village, Yutang Village, Zhangquan Village, Caoping Village, Jintian Village, Yuenan Village, Xinli Village, Pingshan Village, Dongjing Village, Yangquan Village, Quanxin Village, Chongshan Village, Zengjia Village, Qingxi Village, Zhoutang Village, Wanshan Village, Yanzhu Village, Shiyuan Village, Shanshan Village, Shexing Village, Gutang Village, Yanggu Village, Changqing Village, Tieshan Village, Hongqi Village, Pingshang Village, Tianmen Village, Xueshi Village, Qixin Village, Langshu Village, Huatingzi Village, Tuoping Village, and Fengzichong Village (永嘉桥社区、新街社区、新华村、华塘村、毛田村、白杨村、竹元村、石山村、勤家村、霞乐村、谭山村、谭家村、大坡村、大新村、芬水村、芋塘村、张泉村、草坪村、金田村、跃南村、新立村、坪山村、东景村、杨泉村、全心村、崇山村、增加村、清溪村、洲塘村、万山村、烟竹村、石元村、杉山村、蛇形村、古塘村、羊古村、长庆村、铁山村、红旗村、坪上村、天门村、雪市村、齐心村、榔树村、花亭子村、托坪村、丰子冲村).
