= Yutang, Xiangxiang =

Yutang Town 虞塘镇
- Town
- Location in Hunan
- Coordinates: 27°36′39″N 112°21′02″E
- Country: People's Republic of China
- Province: Hunan
- Prefecture-level city: Xiangtan
- County-level city: Xiangxiang

Area
  - Total: 94.6 km^{2} (36.5 sq mi)

Population
  - Total: 38,000
  - Density: 400/km^{2} (1,000/sq mi)
- Time zone: UTC+8 (China Standard)
- Postal code: 411400
- Area code: 0732

Yutang Town (simplified Chinese: 虞塘镇; traditional Chinese: 虞塘鎮; pinyin: Yútáng Zhèn) is an urban town in Xiangxiang City, Hunan Province, People's Republic of China.

== Cityscape ==
The town is divided into 37 villages and two communities, which include the following areas: Xinjie Community, Laojie Community, Huangli Village, Dengshi Village, Yutang Village, Fuxing Village, Bailu Village, Guomen Village, Xima Village, Fenglin Village, Qingshuitang Village, Wulipai Village, Luohong Village, Weixing Village, Yongzhong Village, Fangtang Village, Chishi Village, Daitou Village, Meixia Village, Nishan Village, Yangzhan Village, Guanxian Village, Shuizhuchong Village, Gaoxiong Village, Yangtan Village, Hejia Village, Houhe Village, Houchang Village, Shaojiang Village, Jinmu Village, Jinfeng Village, Supo Village, Daqing Village, Shengtian Village, Shutan Village, Suzhong Village, and Baishifeng Village (新街社区、老街社区、黄里村、邓市村、虞唐村、复兴村、白鹭村、郭门村、洗马村、枫林村、清水塘村、五里牌村、罗宏村、卫星村、永忠村、方塘村、赤石村、岱头村、梅下村、尼山村、杨占村、观贤村、水竹冲村、高维村、洋潭村、河家村、厚河村、厚长村、韶江村、金木村、金峰村、苏坡村、大青村、胜天村、熟潭村、苏中村、白石峰村).
