= Dongjiao, Xiangxiang =

Dongjiao Township 东郊乡
- Township
- Location in Hunan
- Coordinates: 27°45′48″N 112°32′40″E
- Country: People's Republic of China
- Province: Hunan
- Prefecture-level city: Xiangtan
- County-level city: Xiangxiang

Area
  - Total: 162 km^{2} (63 sq mi)

Population
  - Total: 15,000
  - Density: 93/km^{2} (240/sq mi)
- Time zone: UTC+8 (China Standard)
- Postal code: 411400
- Area code: 0732

Dongjiao Township (simplified Chinese: 东郊乡; traditional Chinese: 東郊鄉; pinyin: Dōngjiāo Xiāng) is a rural township in Xiangxiang City, Hunan Province, People's Republic of China.

== Cityscape ==
The township is divided into 30 villages, which include the following areas: Xin Village, Huzhou Village, Huating Village, Dingtuo Village, Wangtang Village, Changfeng Village, Shanghau Village, Daqiao Village, Yangshu Village, Xinjiang Village, Xintang Village, Shijiang Village, Shizhu Village, Wangxing Village, Sanxiang Village, Xinyan Village, Xibei Village, Luogongqiao Village, Taopeng Village, Xiangshao Village, Xianghong Village, Bixing Village, Zhetang Village, Tianyuan Village, Jinxing Village, Xinyuan Village, Yongfeng Village, Fengquan Village, Hujian Village, Zhangu Village, Hengxin Village, Hengzhou Village, and Shichong Village (新村、浒洲村、花亭村、定托村、王塘村、长丰村、上花村、大桥村、杨树村、新江村、新塘村、石江村、石竹村、旺兴村、三湘村、新研村、西北村、罗公桥村、炭棚村、向韶村、向红村、碧星村、柘塘村、田园村、金星村、新园村、永丰村、枫泉村、虎涧村、战鼓村、横新村、横洲村、狮冲村).
