= Tanshi, Xiangxiang =

Tanshi Town 潭市镇
- Town
- Location in Hunan
- Coordinates: 27°43′01″N 112°20′31″E
- Country: People's Republic of China
- Province: Hunan
- Prefecture-level city: Xiangtan
- County-level city: Xiangxiang

Area
  - Total: 127.8 km^{2} (49.3 sq mi)

Population
  - Total: 47,600
  - Density: 372/km^{2} (965/sq mi)
- Time zone: UTC+8 (China Standard)
- Postal code: 411400
- Area code: 0732

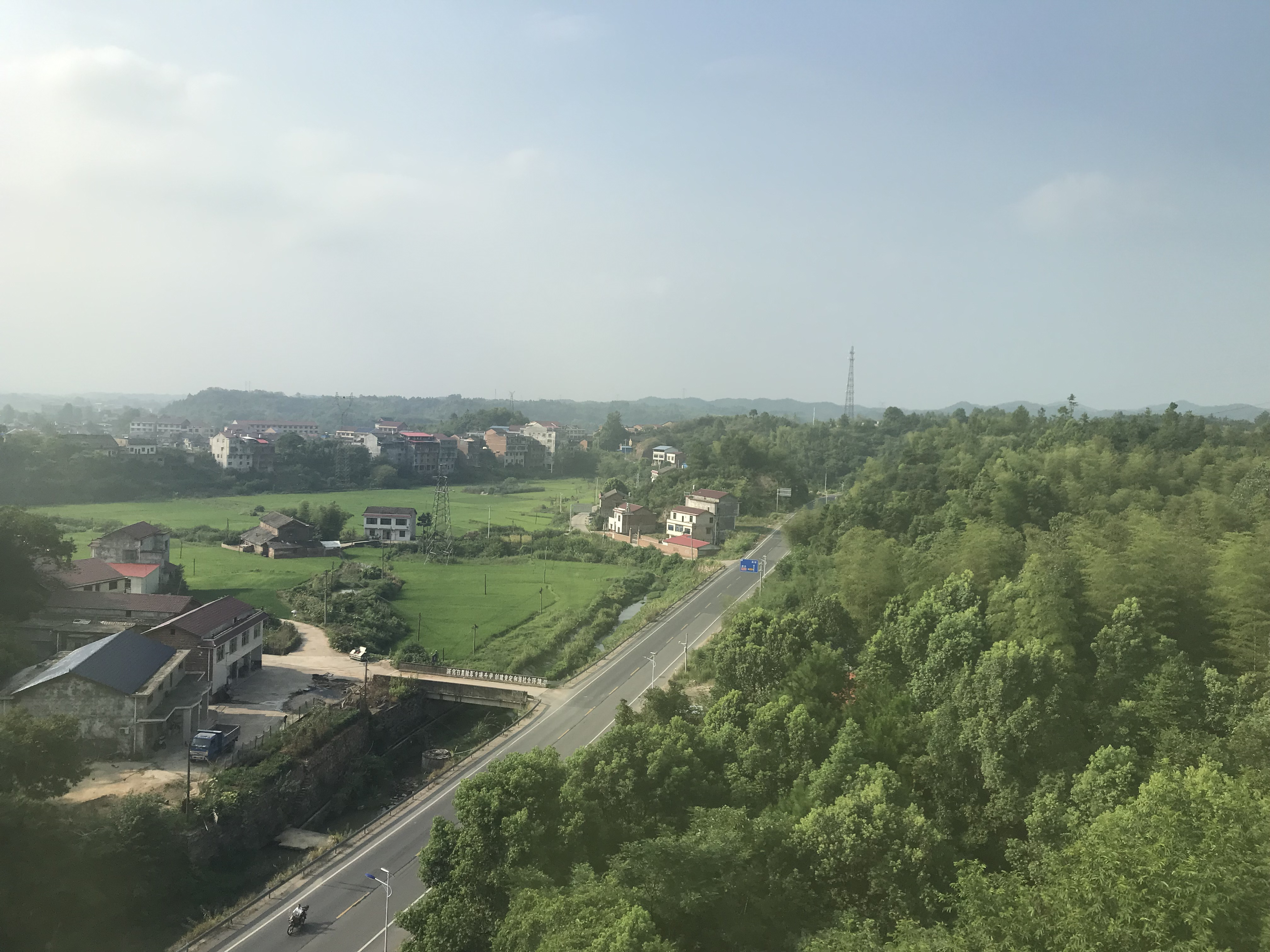

Tanshi Town (simplified Chinese: 潭市镇; traditional Chinese: 潭市鎮; pinyin: Tánshì Zhèn) is an urban town in Xiangxiang City, Hunan Province, People's Republic of China.

== Cityscape ==
The town is divided into 45 villages and three communities, which include the following areas: Tantai Community, Sizong Community, Jiekou Community, Tanshi Village, Anle Village, Xiaoche Village, Anquan Village, Baiyin Village, Baimen Village, Xiufeng Village, Changcheng Village, Dajiangkou Village, Daping Village, Dongshan Village, Gaolun Village, Gaopo Village, Hetang Village, Huangni Village, Jianxin Village, Jinqiao Village, Taoping Village, Jiulun Village, Jiuyan Village, Xinle Village, Langshi Village, Minzhu Village, Nanling Village, Yongming Village, Qingbei Village, Qingfeng Village, Xiquan Village, Qinghe Village, Xitian Village, Qingjiang Village, Zhaping Village, Qingquan Village, Qunyi Village, Shatang Village, Xinmin Village, Shangxin Village, Xinping Village, Shuangjiang Village, Shitang Village, Xinshi Village, Tantai Village, Xinpuzi Village, Xintian Village, and Yuejin Village (潭台社区、四总社区、街口社区、潭市村、安乐村、小车村、安全村、白银村、柏门村、秀丰村、长城村、大江口村、大坪村、洞山村、高仑村、高坡村、鹤塘村、黄泥村、建新村、锦桥村、桃坪村、九仑村、九雁村、新乐村、榔石村、民主村、南岭村、永明村、青陂村、清风村、西全村、清和村、西田村、清江村、榨坪村、清泉村、群益村、砂塘村、新民村、上新村、新坪村、双江村、石塘村、新石村、潭台村、新铺子村、新天村、跃进村).
