= Wang Songling =

- 王松灵
- Born: 1962 (age 63–64); Xiangxiang, Hunan, China
- Education: Peking University Health Science Center; Tokyo Dental College
- Scientific career
- Fields: Oral medicine
- Workplaces: Southern University of Science and Technology

Chinese name
- Traditional Chinese: 王松靈
- Simplified Chinese: 王松灵
Transcriptions
Standard Mandarin
- Hanyu Pinyin: Wáng Sōnglíng

Wang Songling (Chinese: 王松灵; born 1962) is a Chinese physician and academic. He is an academician of the Chinese Academy of Sciences and serves as Dean of the School of Medicine at the Southern University of Science and Technology.

== Biography ==
Wang was born in Xiangxiang, Hunan, in 1962. He studied dentistry at the School of Stomatology, Peking University, where he obtained his bachelor’s degree in 1984, followed by a master’s and doctorate in oral and maxillofacial surgery and oral radiology (1984–1989).

He later undertook research training abroad, first as a visiting scholar at Tokyo Medical and Dental University (1991–1992) and subsequently as a senior visiting fellow at the U.S. National Institutes of Health (NIH) and the National Institute of Dental and Craniofacial Research (NIDCR) between 1996 and 2001.

== Career ==
After completing his doctorate, Wang worked at Beijing Stomatological Hospital, Capital Medical University, where he advanced from attending physician to associate professor (1989–1996). From 1999 to 2005, he was vice president of the hospital, and from 2005 to 2022, he served as vice president of Capital Medical University. He also headed the Department of Biochemistry and Molecular Biology at the university’s School of Basic Medical Sciences and, in 2020, became director of the National Institute of Health and Medical Big Data.

In 2023, Wang was appointed Dean of the joint School of Medicine established by the Southern University of Science and Technology and King’s College London. He was elected as an academician of the Chinese Academy of Sciences in 2019 and in 2020 became a member of the Academic Advisory Committee of the Chinese Academy of Medical Sciences.

Wang has also been active in professional and advisory roles. He was a delegate to the 11th, 12th, and 13th National Committees of the Chinese People’s Political Consultative Conference (CPPCC), vice president of the Beijing Medical Association and the Chinese Stomatological Association, and has served as editor-in-chief or board member of journals including the Chinese Journal of Stomatology, Oral Science and Homeostatic Medicine, and Medical Education Management.

== Research ==
Wang’s research focuses on craniofacial development and regeneration, the diagnosis and treatment of salivary gland disease, and homeostatic medicine. His group identified the human plasma membrane nitrate transporter channel Sialin, discovered Sialin2, and has contributed to the establishment of homeostatic medicine as a research field in China.

He has led work on nitrate-based drugs, investigated the molecular mechanisms of tooth development, and pursued stem cell-based approaches to tooth regeneration, periodontitis, and Sjögren’s syndrome.

== Personal life ==
Wang is married to Xu Yanying, a researcher on mucosal disease and former staff member of the National Natural Science Foundation of China. They have a daughter who is a researcher in health economics.

== Honours and awards ==
Wang has received the following distinctions:

- State Science and Technology Progress Award (Second Class, 2003 and 2010, as first contributor)
- Beijing Science and Technology Progress Award (2018)
- William J. Gies Award (International Dental Research Award)
- Wu Jieping Medical Innovation Award
- Ho Leung Ho Lee Foundation Science and Technology Award
- Zhongyuan Concord Life Science Award (Achievement Award, Stem Cell Translation Award)
- Fellow of the Royal College of Surgeons of Edinburgh (FRCS Edin, honoris causa)
