= Young Mao Zedong statue =

Statue in Hunan province, China

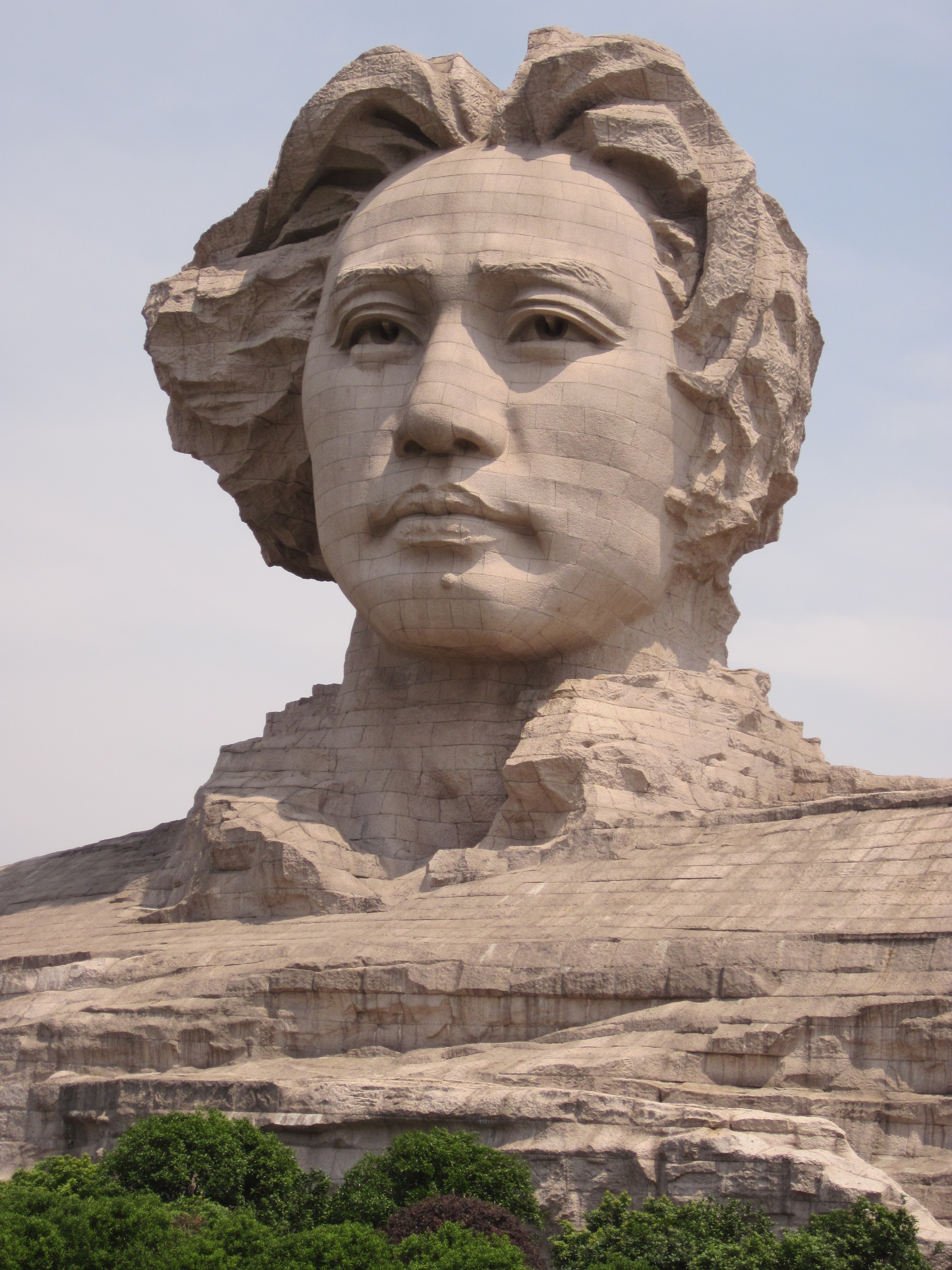
- Young Mao Zedong statue
- Interactive map of Young Mao Zedong statue
- Location: Orange Isle, Changsha, Hunan, China
- Coordinates: 28°10′16″N 112°57′17″E
- Type: Statue
- Material: Granite
- Length: 83 metres (272 ft)
- Width: 41 metres (135 ft)
- Height: 32 metres (105 ft)
- Completion date: 2009

The Young Mao Zedong statue or statue of Young Mao Zedong is located on Orange Isle in Changsha, Hunan. The monument stands 32 metres (105 ft) tall and depicts Mao Zedong's head. The Hunan People's Government began building it in 2007 and it was completed two years later, in 2009. It took more than 800 tons of granite mined from Fujian to complete.

It is 83 metres (272 ft) long, symbolising Mao's age at his death, 41 metres (135 ft) wide, symbolising the number of years he led the Chinese Communist Party from the Zunyi Conference to his death, and 32 metres (105 ft) high, representing Mao's age when he wrote his poem dedicated to Changsha city.

== Gallery ==
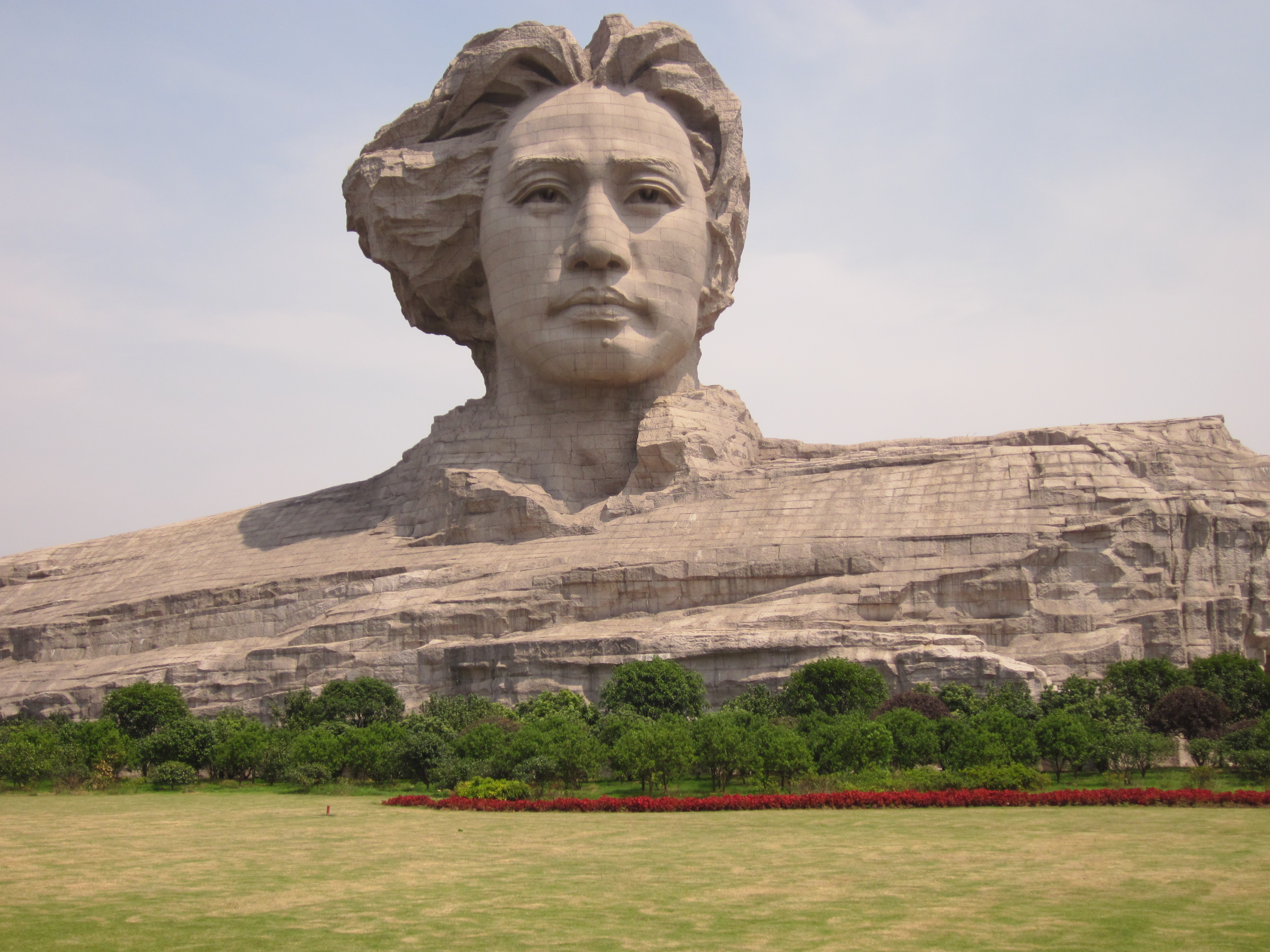
Front of the statue

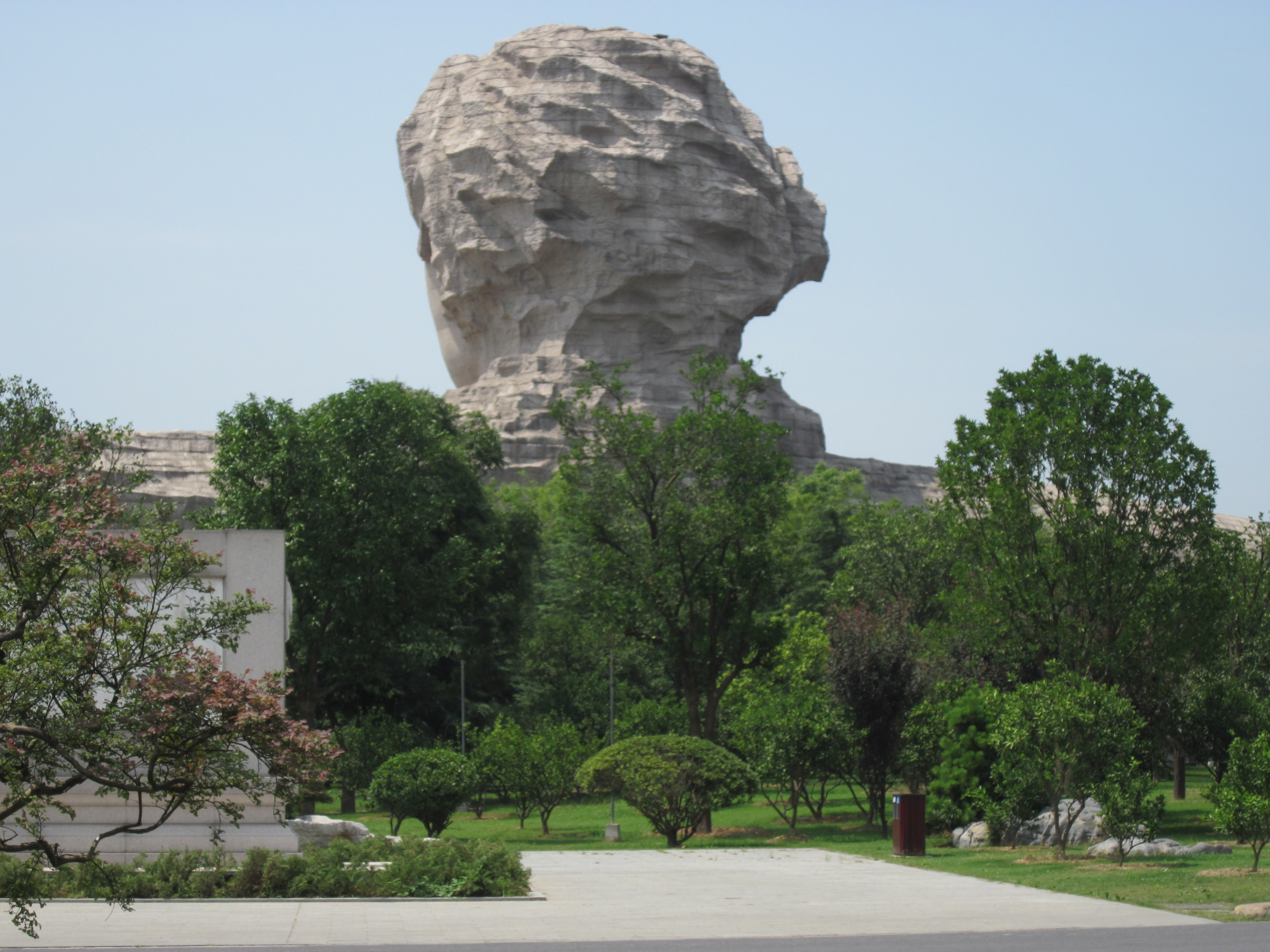
The back of the statue.

== See also ==
- Adiyogi Shiva statue
- Atatürk Mask, İzmir
- Emperors Yan and Huang
- List of statues of Mao Zedong
