= Yang Changji =

Chinese educator, philosopher and writer

- 楊昌濟
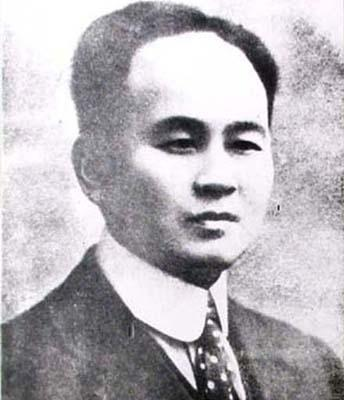
- Yang Changji
- Born: 21 April 1871; Changsha County, Hunan Province, Qing Dynasty
- Died: 17 January 1920 (aged 48); Beijing, Republic of China
- Education: Yuelu Academy; Hongwen Academy; University of Tsukuba; University of Aberdeen; University of Edinburgh
- Occupations: Educator, philosopher, and writer
- Years active: 1912–1920
- Notable work: Dahuazhai Daily; Collected Works of Yang Changji; The origin problem of Ethics
- Spouse: Xiang Zhenxi (向振熙)
- Children: Yang Kaihui
- Parent: Father: Yang Shuxiang (杨书祥)

Yang Changji (simplified Chinese: 杨昌济; traditional Chinese: 楊昌濟; pinyin: Yáng Chāngjì; 21 April 1871 – 17 January 1920), courtesy name Huasheng (華生), was a Chinese educator, ethicist and translator. After about ten years of study in Japan, Britain and Germany, he taught ethics at the Hunan First Normal School in Changsha, where his students included Mao Zedong, Cai Hesen and Xiao Zisheng, and from 1918 he was a professor of ethics at Peking University.

Yang is known for combining Confucian and Neo-Confucian thought with Western ethics, and for his influence on the young Mao, who married his daughter Yang Kaihui.

== Early life and education ==
Yang was born on 21 April 1871 at Bancang in Changsha County, Hunan, where his family had lived for generations. He was grounded in the Confucian and Neo-Confucian traditions, and he passed the county-level examination for the xiucai degree in 1889. He studied at the Yuelu Academy under Wang Xianqian, and during the reform movement in Hunan in the late 1890s he joined reformist societies and published an essay in the newspaper Xiangbao. After the failure of the Hundred Days' Reform in 1898, he left the academy, gave up the imperial examinations and turned to Western learning.

In the winter of 1902, Yang won a scholarship from the Hunan provincial government to study in Japan, and he left in February 1903, adopting the name Huaizhong at that time. In Japan, he studied education at the Kobun Institute, the Tokyo Higher Normal School and the Imperial University. In 1909, on the recommendation of Zhang Shizhao and Yang Yulin, he moved to Britain, where he studied philosophy and ethics at the University of Aberdeen and graduated with a Bachelor of Arts. A review of Liyan Liu's history of the Hunan First Normal School instead locates his British studies in Edinburgh. He then spent several months studying education in France and Germany before returning to China in the spring of 1913. According to Caixin, he had gone abroad to acquire knowledge of the wider world with which to guide Chinese society.

== Teaching in Changsha ==
On his return, Yang turned down a post in the provincial education administration and chose to teach instead, at the Hunan Higher Normal School and at the Provincial Fourth Normal School, where he taught ethics and psychology. According to the historian Liyan Liu, he visited the Hunan First Normal School in the early autumn of 1913 intending to decline its offer of a post, but changed his mind after reading an entrance essay by Cai Hesen. When the Fourth Normal School merged into the First Normal School in February 1914, Yang taught there with students who included Mao Zedong and Cai Hesen. He became one of the most influential and respected teachers at the school, and his students there also included Xiao Zisheng. Mao later called him a spiritual mentor of the New People's Study Society, which Mao and other students founded in April 1918.

In his classes on ethics and self-cultivation, Yang stressed the moral, intellectual and physical development of students and the training of body and mind together. He took cold baths, meditated and walked long distances, and Mao took up his practice of bathing in cold water. Mao's essay "A Study of Physical Education" was published in New Youth in 1917. Yang encouraged his students to read New Youth, and he admired the Hunanese scholars Wang Fuzhi and Wei Yuan. In 1915, he wrote an article in favour of free choice in marriage and equal rights for women. His students often met at his home, and a review of Liu's study described Mao as perhaps his favourite pupil.

Yang also worked to establish a university in Hunan. He first proposed one in 1913, and in 1917, after the Hunan Higher Normal School was ordered to close, he argued for converting it into a university and became director of a preparatory office set up at the Yuelu Academy. In September 1917, he also became academic dean of the Hunan Commercial College. The preparatory office's property later passed to Hunan University when it was formally established in February 1926.

== Peking University ==
In mid-1918, Yang accepted an invitation from Cai Yuanpei to teach ethics at Peking University, where he was appointed a professor in the philosophy department. He moved his family to Beijing and lived in a courtyard house on Doufuchi Hutong. When Mao came to Beijing in August 1918 and asked him for help finding work, Yang introduced him to the university librarian Li Dazhao, who gave Mao a post as a library assistant. Yang also wrote to Zhang Shizhao recommending Mao and Cai Hesen as exceptionally talented young men whom anyone committed to saving the country should support.

== Death ==
Yang died at 5 am on 17 January 1920 at the German Hospital in Beijing. Zhang Shizhao had helped to pay for his medical treatment. The review of Liu's study states that he died of cancer. A memorial service was held at Fayuan Temple on 25 January 1920, and Cai Yuanpei sent a memorial couplet. A notice signed by 29 people, including Cai and Mao, appealed for donations to support his family. Cai remarked that Peking University had been proud to count him among its staff. His coffin was taken south for burial at Bancang, and Mao accompanied it as far as Wuchang. Mao later told the American journalist Edgar Snow that Yang had left a deep impression on him in his youth and had been a true friend.

== Thought ==
Zhang Ming's 2002 doctoral thesis at the University of Edinburgh argues that Yang combined Confucian and Neo-Confucian thought with Western ethics, including the ideas of Kant, the British idealists, Rousseau and Spencer. The thesis identifies valuing the self and understanding present reality as Yang's two central ideas, and it argues that Confucian humanism remained the underlying framework of his thought. Caixin described him as a progressive scholar who regarded Confucianism as a universal truth while also embracing Western humanism and arguing for an individualism directed towards the public good.

Historians have differed over which strand of his thought most influenced Mao. Frederic Wakeman emphasized the neo-Kantian ethics that Yang drew from Friedrich Paulsen, while Liu gives greater weight to Neo-Confucian influences, particularly that of Wang Fuzhi. Yang also introduced Western philosophical, ethical and educational thought to Chinese readers through his translations and writings.

== Personal life ==
Yang married Xiang Zhenxi, and they had a son Yang Kaizhi and a daughter Yang Kaihui. Kaihui was born in 1901. Before his death, Yang asked Mao to look after her, and she married Mao shortly after her father died. Her sons with Mao were Mao Anying, Mao Anqing and Mao Anlong.

== Works ==
- Dahuazhai Diary (達化齋日記), his diary
- History of Western Ethics (西洋倫理學史)
- Analects Excerpts (論語類鈔)

== References and further reading ==
- "Sage in residence: Yang Changji," Ch 6 in Liu, Liyan (2012). Red Genesis the Hunan Normal School and the Creation of Chinese Communism, 1903-1921. Albany: State University of New York Press. ISBN 9781438445052.
