= Yuduan, Xiangxiang =

Yuduan Township 育塅乡
- Township
- Location in Hunan
- Coordinates: 27°48′21″N 112°26′56″E
- Country: People's Republic of China
- Province: Hunan
- Prefecture-level city: Xiangtan
- County-level city: Xiangxiang

Area
  - Total: 88 km^{2} (34 sq mi)

Population
  - Total: 39,860
  - Density: 450/km^{2} (1,200/sq mi)
- Time zone: UTC+8 (China Standard)
- Postal code: 411400
- Area code: 0732

Yuduan Township (simplified Chinese: 育塅乡; traditional Chinese: 育塅鄉; pinyin: Yùduàn Xiāng) is a rural township in Xiangxiang City, Hunan Province, People's Republic of China.

== Cityscape ==
The township is divided into 35 villages, which include the following areas: Changlun Village, Huchong Village, Xiaochong Village, Anchong Village, Shi'e Village, Tianping Village, Zhongtian Village, Yangming Village, Shideng Village, Quanlong Village, Yuqiao Village, Yuduan Village, Zhichong Village, Shuiqiao Village, Shantang Village, Renmei Village, Shangshan Village, Shuangqiao Village, Shidong Village, Huaping Village, Junshan Village, Songyue Village, Daqiao Village, Anxiang Village, Zhaqiao Village, Zhaping Village, Zhajiang Village, Nanping Village, Nanchong Village, Nanshan Village, Shuikousi Village, Dongtangpu Village, Dongchong Village, Henglu Village, and Shiquan Village (长仑村、虎冲村、小冲村、安冲村、石鹅村、田坪村、中田村、杨名村、石磴村、泉龙村、育桥村、育段村、直冲村、水桥村、山塘村、仁美村、上山村、双桥村、石洞村、花坪村、军山村、松岳村、大桥村、安乡村、轧乔村、轧坪村、轧江村、南坪村、南冲村、南山村、水口斯村、东塘铺村、东冲村、横路村、石泉村).
