= Xiangxiang =

Xiangxiang 湘乡市 Siangsiang; Hsianghsiang
- County-level city
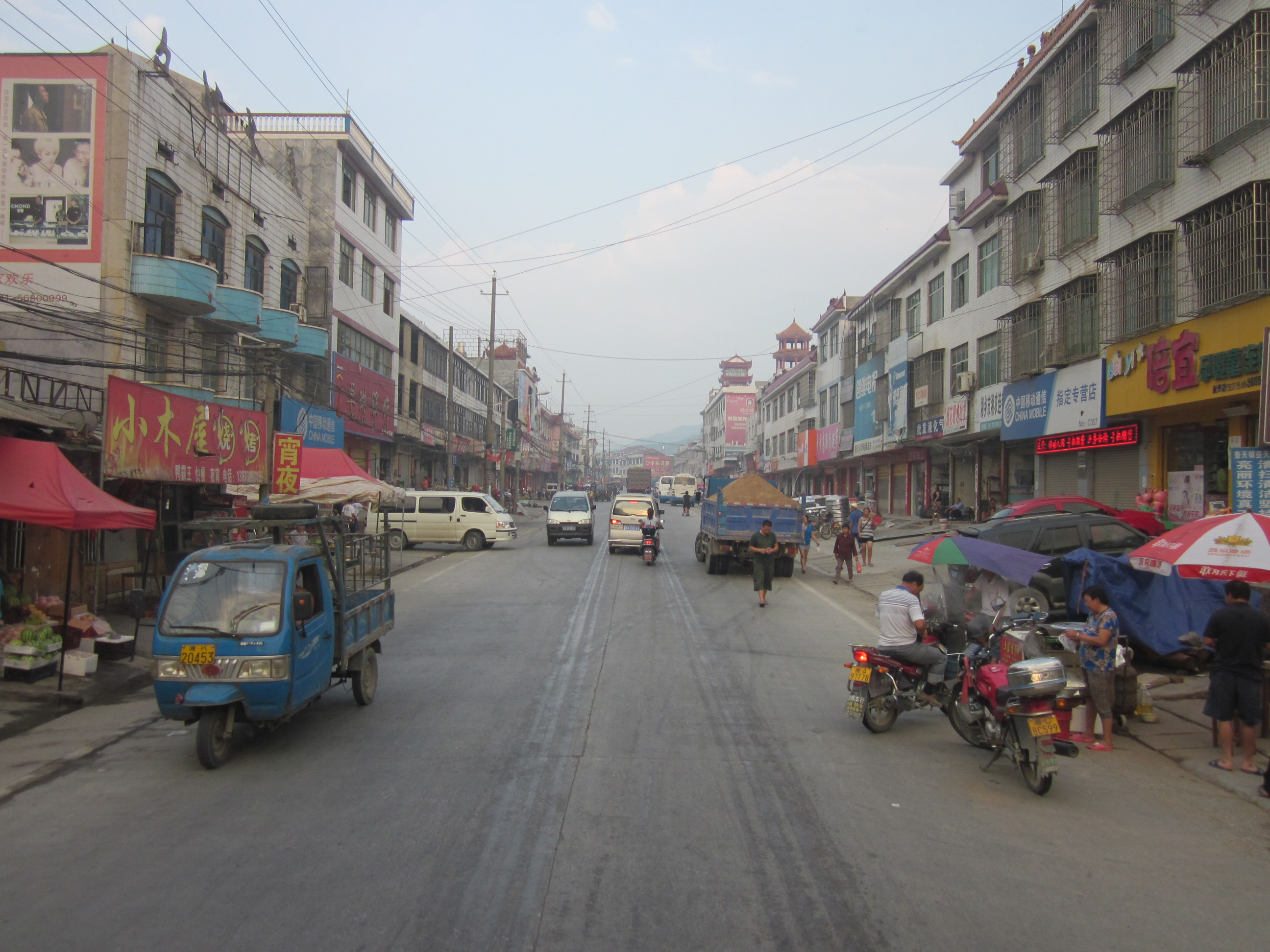
- Hutian Town

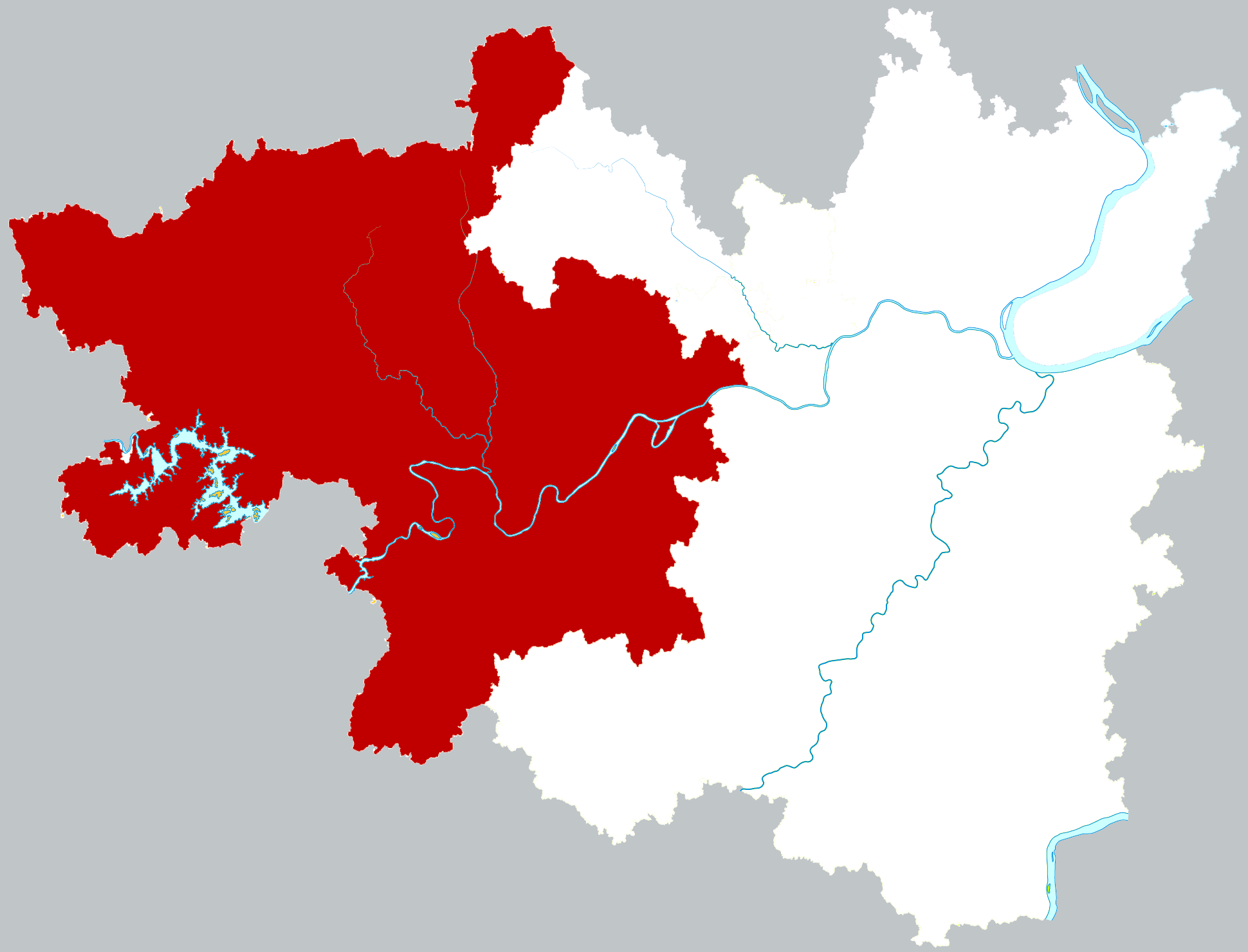
- Location of Xiangxiang City within Xiangtan

- Location in Hunan
- Coordinates: 27°43′07″N 112°33′01″E
- Country: People's Republic of China
- Province: Hunan
- Prefecture-level city: Xiangtan

Area
  - County-level city: 1,966.6 km^{2} (759.3 sq mi)
  - Urban: 26.00 km^{2} (10.04 sq mi)

Population (2017)
  - County-level city: 946,000
  - Density: 481/km^{2} (1,250/sq mi)
  - Urban: 235,000
- Time zone: UTC+8 (China Standard)

Xiangxiang
- Simplified Chinese: 湘乡
- Traditional Chinese: 湘鄉
Transcriptions
Standard Mandarin
- Hanyu Pinyin: Xiāngxiāng
- Wade–Giles: Hsiang^{1}-hsiang^{1}
- IPA: [ɕjáŋ.ɕjáŋ]

Xiangxiang (simplified Chinese: 湘乡; traditional Chinese: 湘鄉; pinyin: Xiāngxiāng) is a county-level city under the administration of Xiangtan, Hunan province, China. Located on Central Hunan and the west of Xiangtan, Xiangxiang is bordered by Ningxiang County and Shaoshan City to the north, Xiangtan County to the east, Shuangfeng County to the south, Louxing District of Loudi City to the west, it has an area of 1,912.7 km^{2} (738.5 sq mi) with a population of roughly 850,000 (as of 2012). It has four subdistricts, 15 towns and three townships under its jurisdiction, the government seat is Wangchunmen (望春门街道).

== History ==
As a place name, 'Xiangxiang' dates back to 3 BCE in the Eastern Han dynasty when Emperor Ai of Han (刘欣) bestowed it upon Changsha Prince Liu Chang (刘昌). In the years leading up to 1952, Xiangxiang's territory included present day Shaoshan, Shuangfeng County and Loudi.

== Administrative divisions ==
There are numerous township-level divisions in Xiangxiang.

Name	Chinese	Population (2005)	Area (Km2)	Note
Wangchunmen	望春门街道	38,000	7.8	
Dongshan	东山街道	40,161	3.98	
Xinxianglu	新湘路街道	89,000	20.03	
Kunlunqiao	昆仑桥街道	38,139		
Quantang	泉塘镇	49,700		
Zhongsha	中沙镇	26,230	68.5	
Hutian	壶天镇	49,580	144.7	
Shanzao	山枣镇	50,430	101.7	
Yueshan	月山镇	69,880	146.5	
Lishan	栗山镇	27,100	67.8	
Meiqiao	梅桥镇	50,900	137.6	
Qizi	棋梓镇	53,000	138.9	
Maotian	毛田镇	21,480	78	
Tanshi	潭市镇	47,600	127.8	
Baitian	白田镇	48,000	105.73	
Fanjiang	翻江镇	42,880	133.39	
Yutang	虞塘镇	38,000	94.6	
Jinshi	金石镇	35,860	88.9	
Longdong	龙洞镇	29,200	76.8	
Dongjiao	东郊乡	15,000	162	
Yuduan	育塅乡	39,860	88	
Jinsou	金薮乡	29,420 (2010)		

== Climate ==
Climate data for Xiangxiang, elevation 87 m (285 ft), (1991–2020 normals, extremes 1981–present)
Month	Jan	Feb	Mar	Apr	May	Jun	Jul	Aug	Sep	Oct	Nov	Dec	Year
Record high °C (°F)	24.0 (75.2)	30.5 (86.9)	33.7 (92.7)	35.9 (96.6)	36.2 (97.2)	37.3 (99.1)	39.6 (103.3)	40.9 (105.6)	38.2 (100.8)	35.9 (96.6)	32.5 (90.5)	24.6 (76.3)	40.9 (105.6)
Mean daily maximum °C (°F)	8.7 (47.7)	11.7 (53.1)	16.1 (61.0)	22.6 (72.7)	27.0 (80.6)	30.1 (86.2)	33.6 (92.5)	32.9 (91.2)	28.7 (83.7)	23.4 (74.1)	17.7 (63.9)	11.6 (52.9)	22.0 (71.6)
Daily mean °C (°F)	5.2 (41.4)	7.8 (46.0)	11.8 (53.2)	17.9 (64.2)	22.4 (72.3)	25.9 (78.6)	29.1 (84.4)	28.2 (82.8)	24.0 (75.2)	18.6 (65.5)	13.0 (55.4)	7.4 (45.3)	17.6 (63.7)
Mean daily minimum °C (°F)	2.7 (36.9)	5.0 (41.0)	8.8 (47.8)	14.4 (57.9)	19.0 (66.2)	22.8 (73.0)	25.6 (78.1)	24.9 (76.8)	20.7 (69.3)	15.3 (59.5)	9.7 (49.5)	4.4 (39.9)	14.4 (58.0)
Record low °C (°F)	−6.6 (20.1)	−6.9 (19.6)	−1.8 (28.8)	2.2 (36.0)	10.5 (50.9)	13.0 (55.4)	19.1 (66.4)	17.0 (62.6)	11.3 (52.3)	2.8 (37.0)	−2.1 (28.2)	−11.0 (12.2)	−11.0 (12.2)
Average precipitation mm (inches)	72.8 (2.87)	82.9 (3.26)	143.1 (5.63)	159.1 (6.26)	206.4 (8.13)	221.5 (8.72)	151.8 (5.98)	114.0 (4.49)	76.5 (3.01)	62.8 (2.47)	76.6 (3.02)	53.6 (2.11)	1,421.1 (55.95)
Average precipitation days (≥ 0.1 mm)	14.0	14.3	18.0	16.9	16.5	14.8	9.8	10.9	8.9	9.7	10.6	10.8	155.2
Average snowy days	4.6	2.4	0.6	0.1	0	0	0	0	0	0	0.2	1.6	9.5
Average relative humidity (%)	80	80	81	79	80	82	75	78	79	78	78	76	79
Mean monthly sunshine hours	61.2	62.7	76.2	105.9	131.7	132.5	221.7	200.1	147.0	125.3	111.2	93.0	1,468.5
Percentage possible sunshine	19	20	21	27	31	32	52	50	40	36	35	29	33
Source: China Meteorological Administration

== Notable people ==
- Zeng Guofan
- Mao Zedong attended high school in the city.
- Zhou Qunfei
- Xiao Zisheng
- Zeng Baosun
- Cai Chang
- Xiao San
- Chung Ching
- Wang Songling, medical scientist and member of the Chinese Academy of Sciences (CAS).
- Yu Zhimo
- Song Wenhan, a lieutenant general in the People's Liberation Army who served as chief of staff of the Guangzhou Military Region from 1996 to 2002.
