= Zhongsha, Xiangxiang =

Zhongsha Town 中沙镇
- Town
- Location in Hunan
- Coordinates: 27°32′38″N 112°21′03″E
- Country: People's Republic of China
- Province: Hunan
- Prefecture-level city: Xiangtan
- County-level city: Xiangxiang

Area
  - Total: 68.5 km^{2} (26.4 sq mi)

Population
  - Total: 26,230
  - Density: 383/km^{2} (992/sq mi)
- Time zone: UTC+8 (China Standard)
- Postal code: 411400
- Area code: 0732

Zhongsha Town (simplified Chinese: 中沙镇; traditional Chinese: 中沙鎮; pinyin: Zhōngshā Zhèn) is an urban town in Xiangxiang City, Hunan Province, People's Republic of China.

== Cityscape ==
The town is divided into 27 villages and one community, which include the following areas: Zhongsha Community, Wanfu Village, Chaoyang Village, Zhongsha Village, Daoping Village, Honghe Village, Xichong Village, Dongshang Village, Yunju Village, Daochang Village, Meilong Village, Shitang Village, Futang Village, Zhubu Village, Dashan Village, Zhongxin Village, Longshan Village, Tianxin Village, Wanbao Village, Maoshe Village, Xiaodong Village, Cangquan Village, Meikou Village, Guihua Village, Zifeng Village, Daochong Village, Hushan Village, and Zishan Village (中沙社区、万福村、朝阳村、中沙村、道坪村、红荷村、西冲村、洞上村、云居村、道常村、梅龙村、石塘村、扶塘村、主步村、大杉村、中心村、龙山村、田心村、万宝村、茅畲村、小洞村、沧泉村、梅口村、桂花村、紫峰村、道冲村、虎山村、紫山村).
