= Shanzao, Xiangxiang =

Shanzao Town 山枣镇
- Town
- Location in Hunan
- Coordinates: 27°39′44″N 112°27′21″E
- Country: People's Republic of China
- Province: Hunan
- Prefecture-level city: Xiangtan
- County-level city: Xiangxiang

Area
  - Total: 101.7 km^{2} (39.3 sq mi)

Population
  - Total: 50,430
  - Density: 495.9/km^{2} (1,284/sq mi)
- Time zone: UTC+8 (China Standard)
- Postal code: 411400
- Area code: 0732

Shanzao Town (simplified Chinese: 山枣镇; traditional Chinese: 山棗鎮; pinyin: Shānzǎo Zhèn) is an urban town in Xiangxiang City, Hunan Province, People's Republic of China.

== Cityscape ==
The town is divided into 41 villages and one community, which include the following areas: Shanzao Community, Yanjing Village, Zhujin Village, Xinfei Village, Feilian Village, Longquan Village, Houfeng Village, Yaochong Village, Wanguan Village, Shanzao Village, Huxing Village, Jinhua Village, Qingshun Village, Chengjiang Village, Shuidong Village, Chengfu Village, Baishazhou Village, Jingzheng Village, Baoyuan Village, Xinyue Village, Xintanglun Village, Hongtang Village, Hongshan Village, Fengshu Village, Shantian Village, Shuanglin Village, Qiaotai Village, Yongxing Village, Diping Village, Liangshan Village, Lianhua Village, Lianfeng Village, Lianzhang Village, Wangyue Village, Dashanchong Village, Yunshan Village, Jiujiang Village, Gaosheng Village, Chansheng Village, Xinsheng Village, Dasheng Village, and Qiaotuo Village (山枣社区、盐井村、洙津村、新飞村、飞涟村、龙泉村、厚丰村、窑冲村、万贯村、山枣村、虎形村、金华村、青顺村、城江村、水东村、城埠村、白沙洲村、经正村、葆元村、新跃村、新塘仑村、洪塘村、洪山村、枫树村、山田村、双林村、桥台村、永兴村、低坪村、良山村、莲花村、莲峰村、莲长村、望岳村、大山冲村、云山村、九江村、高胜村、蚕胜村、新胜村、大胜村、板托村).
