= Qizi, Xiangxiang =

Qizi Town 棋梓镇
- Town
- Location in Hunan
- Coordinates: 27°43′37″N 112°13′19″E
- Country: People's Republic of China
- Province: Hunan
- Prefecture-level city: Xiangtan
- County-level city: Xiangxiang

Area
  - Total: 138.9 km^{2} (53.6 sq mi)

Population
  - Total: 53,000
  - Density: 380/km^{2} (990/sq mi)
- Time zone: UTC+8 (China Standard)
- Postal code: 411400
- Area code: 0732

Qizi Town (simplified Chinese: 棋梓镇; traditional Chinese: 棋梓鎮; pinyin: Qízǐ Zhèn) is an urban town in Xiangxiang City, Hunan Province, People's Republic of China.

== Cityscape ==
The town is divided into 32 villages and three communities, which include the following areas: Wanluoshan Community, Dongjia Community, Shaofengjituan Community, Qizi Village, Baiyun Village, Changyuan Village, Dafu Village, Eshi Village, Gushui Village, Hefeng Village, Heping Village, Hedong Village, Huangling Village, Jinlong Village, Lianshan Village, Longjiang Village, Lutang Village, Meihua Village, Minghe Village, Nan'an Village, Nixi Village, Pinghu Village, Pingtang Village, Pu'an Village, Shanping Village, Shanshan Village, Shetan Village, Xiashan Village, Xiangyang Village, Xiaoluo Village, Xinhe Village, Yintang Village, Yuzhuang Village, Yufang Village, Zejiang Village, and Xikouyuchang Village (万罗山社区、洞嘉社区、湖南韶峰集团社区、棋梓村、白云村、长元村、大富村、鹅石村、谷水村、荷风村、和平村、河洞村、黄岭村、金龙村、连山村、龙江村、炉塘村、梅花村、明和村、南岸村、泥溪村、坪湖村、坪塘村、普安村、杉坪村、杉山村、蛇潭村、峡山村、向阳村、小罗村、新和村、银塘村、余庄村、喻坊村、泽江村、湘乡溪口渔场村).
