= Xiao Zisheng =

- 萧子升
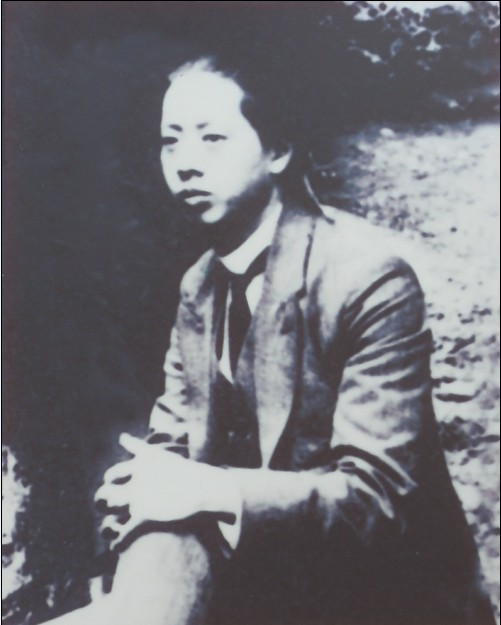
- Xiao Zisheng
- Born: 22 August 1894; Xiangxiang, Hunan, Qing Empire
- Died: 21 November 1976 (aged 82); Uruguay
- Other names: Xudong; Shutong; Xiao Yu (萧瑜)
- Education: Dongshan High School; Hunan First Normal University
- Occupations: Educator, scholar
- Agent: China International Library
- Notable work: Biography of Mao Zedong and Me
- Political party: Kuomintang
- Parent: Xiao Yueying
- Relatives: Xiao San (brother)

Xiao Zisheng (simplified Chinese: 萧子升; traditional Chinese: 蕭子升; pinyin: Xiāo Zǐshēng; 22 August 1894 – 21 November 1976) was a Chinese educator and scholar.

== Names ==
His birthname was Xiao Zisheng (萧子昇). His style name was Xudong (旭东) and his pseudonym was Shutong (书同).

== Biography ==
Xiao was born in Xiangxiang, Hunan on 22 August 1894, the elder son of Xiao Yueying (萧岳英), a Chinese educator. He had a younger brother, Xiao San. In 1910, he attended Dongshan Higher Elementary School. In 1909, he enrolled in the Dongshan High School and graduated in 1911, where he studied alongside Mao Zedong and Xiao San. At that school, his father was the physics teacher. In 1911, he was accepted to Hunan First Normal University and graduated in 1915. He studied under Yang Changji. After college, he taught at Chuyi School. In 1918, he founded New People's Study Society with Mao Zedong. In 1919, he traveled to France for the Work-Study Program, becoming the secretary of China-France Education Association. He returned to China in 1924, and served in various posts in universities and colleges in Beijing. From 1931 to 1945, during the Second Sino-Japanese War, he lived in France to escape the violence. He once served as President of China International Library.

In 1949, he went to Taiwan, then moved to France and Switzerland. In 1952, he settled in Uruguay. On 21 November 1976, he died.

== Bibliography ==
- Mao Tse-Tung and I Were Beggars (1959)
- Biography of Mao Zedong and Me
