= Orange Isle Bridge =

Orange Isle Bridge 橘子洲大桥
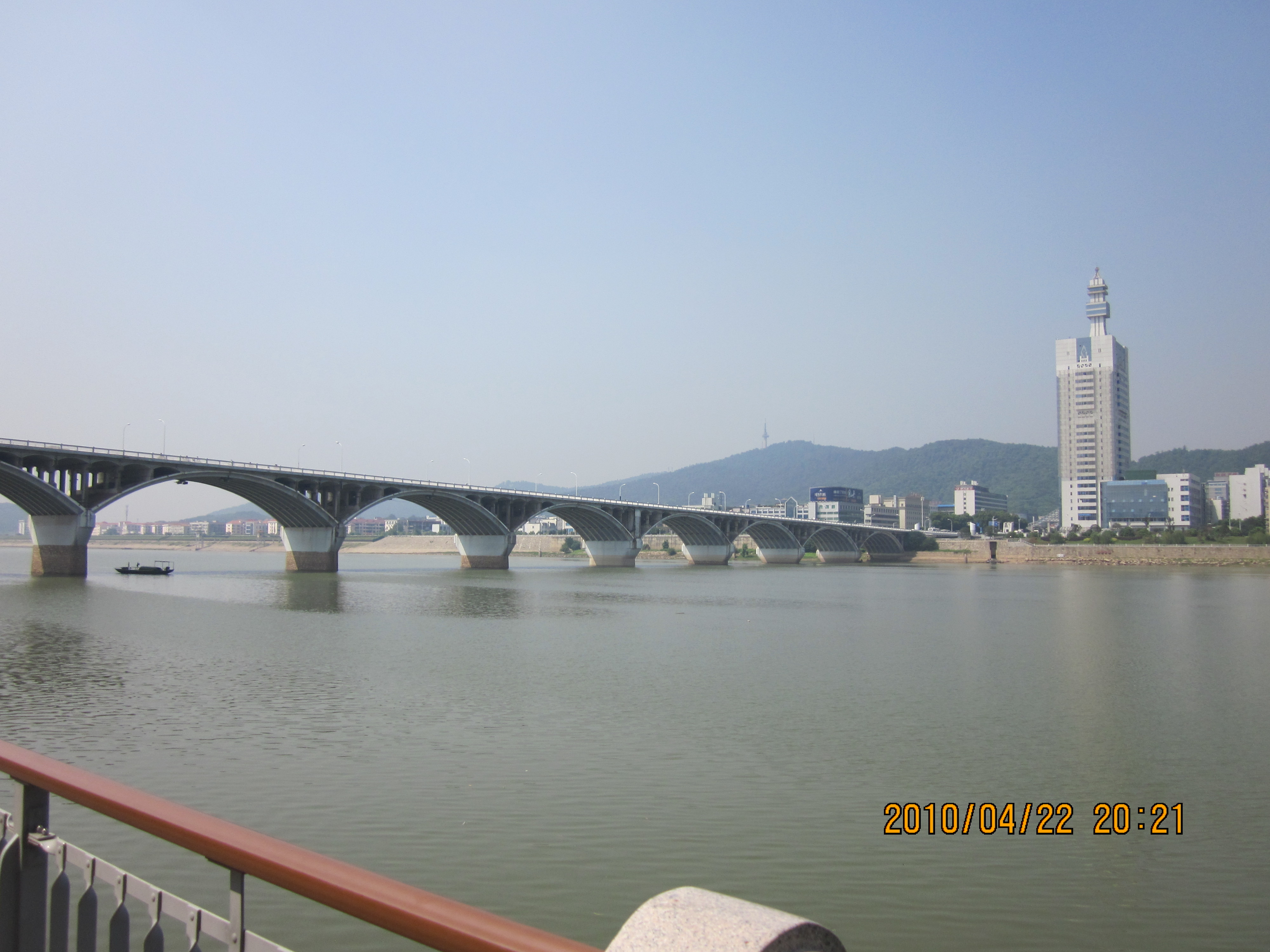
- Orange Isle Bridge in April 2010.
- Coordinates: 28°12′06″N 112°58′10″E
- Carries: Motor vehicles, pedestrians and bicycles
- Crosses: Xiang River
- Locale: Changsha, Hunan, China
- Other name(s): Juzizhou Bridge; Changsha Xiang River Bridge

Characteristics
- Design: Arch Bridge
- Material: Concrete, steel
- Total length: 1,250 metres (4,100 ft)
- Width: 76 metres (249 ft)
- Traversable?: Yes
- No. of spans: 21
- No. of lanes: 4

History
- Construction start: September 6, 1971
- Opened: October 1, 1972

Chinese name
- Simplified Chinese: 橘子洲大桥
- Traditional Chinese: 橘子洲大橋
Transcriptions
Standard Mandarin
- Hanyu Pinyin: Júzǐzhōu Dàqiáo

Changsha Xiang River Bridge
- Simplified Chinese: 长沙湘江大桥
- Traditional Chinese: 長沙湘江大橋
Transcriptions
Standard Mandarin
- Hanyu Pinyin: Chángshā Xiāngjiāng Dàqiáo

Location
- Interactive map of Orange Isle Bridge

The Orange Isle Bridge (Chinese: 橘子洲大桥) is an arch bridge over the Xiang River in Changsha, Hunan, China. It connects Yuelu District and Furong District.

== History ==
In May 1971, the former Ministry of Communications approved the Changsha Municipal People's Government to build a bridge between Yuelu District and Furong District. On September 6, the construction of Orange Isle Bridge was started, at that time it was called "Changsha Xiang River Bridge" (长沙湘江大桥).

In March 1972, the construction team built 18 piers of the bridge. On September 30 of the same year, the bridge was completed and opened to traffic.

In January 2006, it was renamed "Orange Isle Bridge".
