= Oghlu =

Oghlu may refer to:

- oğlu, an Azerbaijani and Turkish word meaning 'son of', notably used in Azerbaijani and Turkish names
- -oglou (-ογλου) or -óglou (-όγλου), a Greek surname ending derived from oğlu
- Ughli, a village in Iran
