= Chung Ching =

Chinese actress

Zhang Linlin
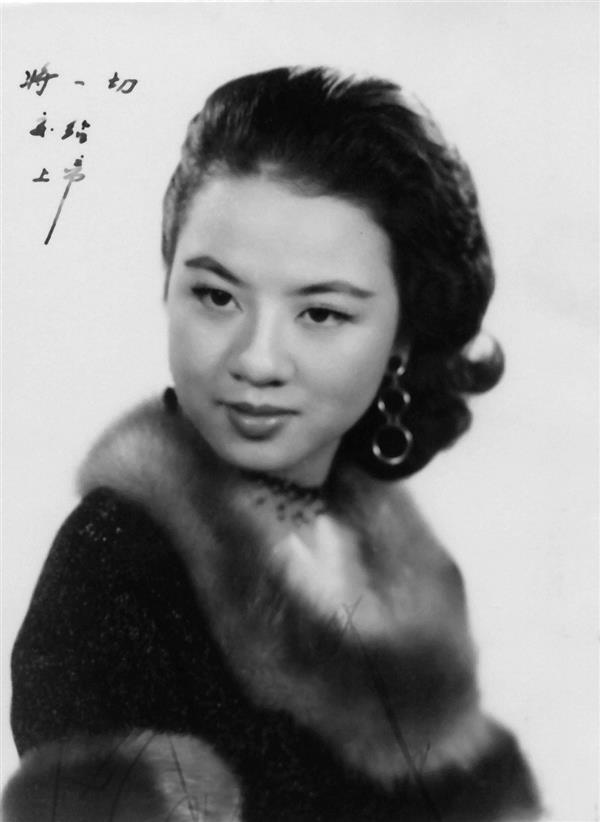
- Linlin in the 1950s
- Born: June 12, 1933 (age 93); Xiangxiang, Hunan Province, China (prior to 1949)
- Other name: Chung Ching
- Years active: 1953–1967

Zhang Linlin (張玲麟, born Xiangxiang, June 12, 1933), better known by the Hong Kong stage name Chung Ching (鍾情; Zhōng Qíng), is a popular leading lady of Hong Kong films in the 1950s. After completing 54 films from 1953 to 1967, starring as the leading role in many of them, she retired from film at the height of her career to become well known as a painter using both shui-mo and Western watercolor techniques.

== Early life ==
Zhang Linlin was born on June 12, 1933 in Xiangxiang, Hunan Province, China. She was born into a family bearing the surname, Zhōng (鍾) on her mother's side, which inspired her stage name, Chung Ching. After the founding of the People's Republic of China in 1949, her family fled to British Hong Kong, where she grew up and later entered the film industry.

== Acting career ==
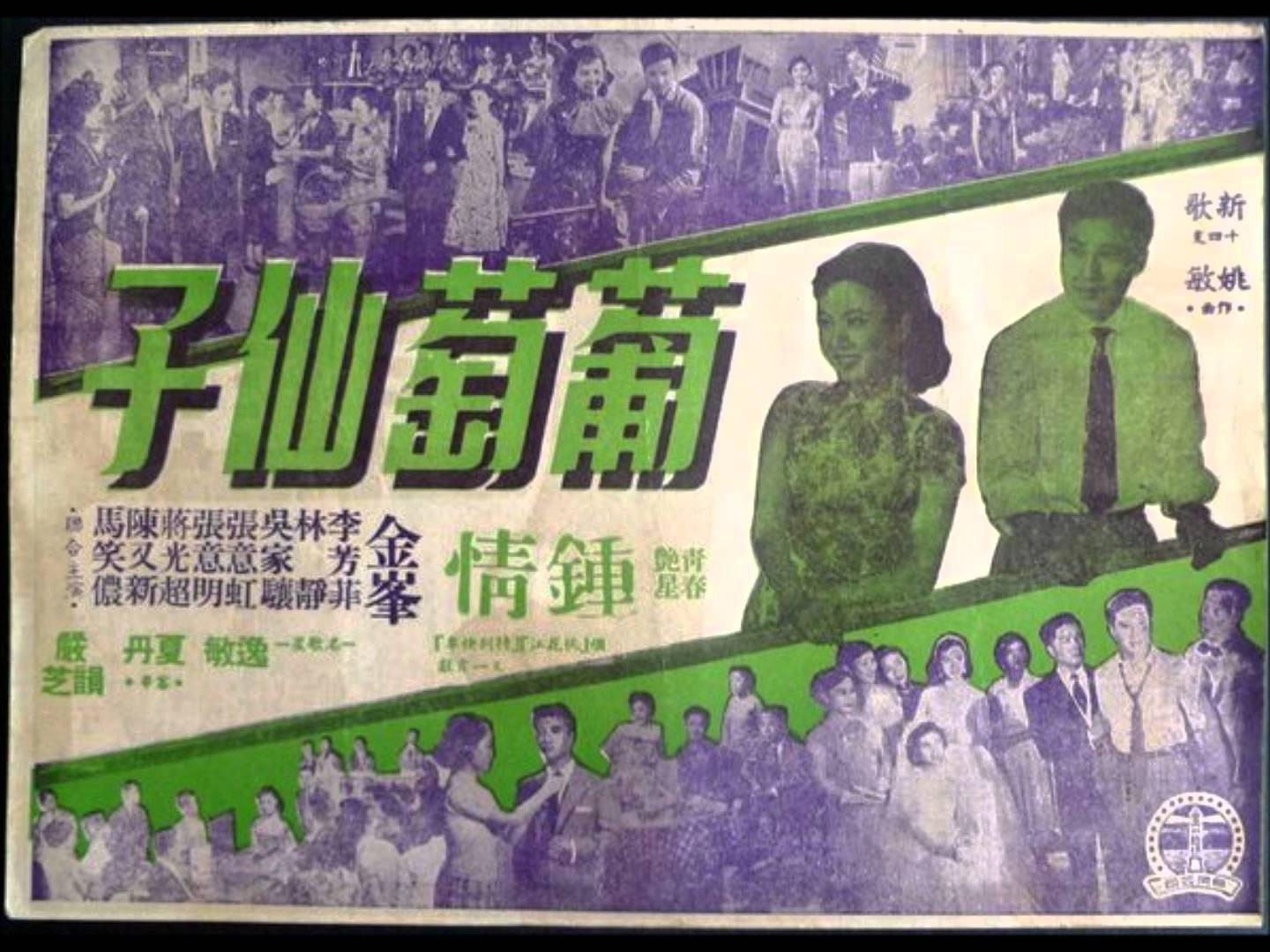
A movie poster for one of the films she has appeared in

Chung Ching became one of Hong Kong's leading ladies of the 1950s, starring in dozens of films in a variety of genres from melodramas to musical-romances. Her film debut was in 1953, with the film, Seven Sisters, after which she quickly rose to prominence. In 1956, she landed the title role of the musical, Songs of the Peach Blossom River, which was a breakthrough hit that made her a star. The film's success in Taiwan and Southeast Asia helped establish her nickname and image.

Throughout the late 1950s, Chung Ching appeared in many popular films, such as The Storm-Tossed Village (1957), Madame Butterfly (1956), and Give Me a Kiss (1958). She often played roles as country girls or village women, a contrast to her glamorous off-screen image, and became known for her charming "Little Wild Cat" persona. Chung Ching herself wasn't a trained singer; in many of her musical films, her songs were dubbed by the popular playback singer, Yao Lee.

Chung Ching worked prolifically, completing about 54 films between 1953 and 1967. She was reportedly in great demand; by the late 1950s, She was commanding record salaries and even started her own production company (Qilin Film Company) to make her own color films in 1958. However, a string of box-office disappointments and health problems around that time slowed her career. After a brief comeback in the mid-1960s, she retired from film in 1967 at age 34.

== Later life and contribution to arts ==
After retiring from film in 1967, Zhang Linlin embarked on a new artistic path. She studied Chinese brush painting under the master, Ding Yanyong, and later practiced Western watercolor techniques. By the 1980s, she was exhibiting her paintings in Hong Kong and Taiwan; for example, a Hong Kong charity exhibition in 1986 featured her ink and watercolor works. Christie's and Sotheby's have since sold her paintings, noting her unique background:

Zhang Linglin is a student of Ding Yanyong. She was better known by the Hong Kong stage name Chung Ching and was a popular leading lady of Hong Kong films in the 1950s. Later she become well known as a painter using both Chinese ink and Western watercolor techniques.

== Public image and personal life ==
Chung Ching's public image was describes as that of an "energetic, innocent country girl" – a typecast in which she often portrayed. She earned affectionate nicknames like "Little Wildcat" (小野貓) due to her roles. Off-screen, she was known to be private from others. After retiring from film, she opened a restaurant in Hong Kong and pursued painting and photography, rarely appearing in the media as an actress.

Details of her family and personal relationships are not well documented in public sources. What is clear is that she withdrew fully from the film scene by her mid-30s. According to a Hong Kong auction house catalogue, she left the film industry to study painting, later become a photographer, and held multiple solo art exhibitions.

== Legacy ==
Even after she left cinema, Linlin's influence persists in Hong Kong film history. She helped popularize the 1950s "singing film" genre and remains cited in scholarly accounts for Chinese film. For instance, film historians note that Songs of the Peach Blossom River and Chung Ching's performance helped reinvigorate Mandarin musicals in Hong Kong. Today, cinephiles and film collectors regard her as a classic-era film icon. As one retrospective notes, her on-screen image – often overlaid with Yao Lee's voice – "became the hottest musical combination of the mid-1950s."

== Filmography ==
- Seven Sisters (1953) "七姊妹"
- It Blossoms Again (1954) "再春花" ... Hui Fang
- Blood-Stained Flowers (1954) "碧血黄花"
- Lady Balsam's Conquest (1955) "海棠红"
- What Price Beauty? (1955) "小白菜"
- Blood Will Tell (1955) "小凤仙续集"
- Beauty of Tokyo (1955) "樱都艳迹"
- The Heroine (1955) "杨娥"
- Over the Rolling Hills (1956) "那个不多情"
- Sweet as a Melon (1956) "采西瓜的姑娘"
- The Story of a Fur Coat (1956) "金缕衣"
- Angel of the Vineyard (1956) "葡萄仙子" also 葡萄夫人
- Madame Butterfly (1956) "蝴蝶夫人"
- Xi Shi (1956) "卧薪尝胆"
- Blind Love (1956)"盲恋"
- Who Isn't Romantic? (1956)"关山行"
- Songs of the Peach Blossom River (1956) "桃花江"as Jin Lirong / Wild Cat
- You Are the Winds of Spring (1957) "春色无边" as Hon May
- Love Fiesta (1957)"飞来艳福"
- The Storm-Tossed Village (1957) "风雨桃花村"
- Corpse-Drivers of Xiangxi (1957)"湘西赶尸记"
- Life with Grandma (1957) "满庭芳"
- The Nightingale of Alishan (1957) "阿里山之莺" as Fu Ah Na
- Holiday Express (1957) "特别快车"
- Teenagers Folly (1957) "郎如春日风"
- A Perfect Match (1958) "龙凤姻缘"
- Red Lantern (1958) "借红灯"as Jinfeng
- The Blood-Stained Lantern (1958)"血影灯"
- Love at First Sight (1958)"一见钟情"
- A Kiss for Me (1958) "给我一个吻"
- The Flight of the Phoenix (1958)"凤凰于飞"
- The Film World's Merry Song (1958)"银海笙歌"
- The Vengeance of the Vampire (1959)"僵尸复仇"
- Day-Time Husband (1959) "血洒情花"
- Lovers in a Sea of Desire (1959)"欲海情花"
- The Mermaid (1959)"美人鱼"
- Princess of a Hundred Flowers (1959) "百花公主"as Ding Ai-Lin/Gao Yue-Ying
- Full of Joy (1959) "湘女多情"
- Dear Girl, I Love You (1959) "妹妹我爱你"
- Crimes of Passion (1959)"毒蟒情鸳"
- The Lovesick Woman (1959)"私恋"
- The Amorous Pussy-Cat (1960) "多情的野猫"
- Secret Affairs (1960) "入室佳人"
- A Challenge of Love (1960) "情敌"
- What Love Achieves (1960)
- The Witch-Girl, He Yue'er (1961)"妖女何月儿"
- The Lovers and the Python (1961)
- Who Isn't Romantic? (Part 2) (1962) "那个不多情续集"
- The Honest Hero and the Faithful Dog (1963)"游侠义犬"
- The Magic Lamp (1964) "宝莲灯"as Qin Guanbao
- The Greatest Love Affair on Earth (1964) "南北喜相逢" as Lo-Pin
- The Better Halves (1964) "鸾凤和鸣" as Hsiao-tsui
- Song of the Waves (1966)"浪淘沙"
- Peach Blossom River (1967)"新桃花江"
