= Xiao San =

Chinese poet and writer (1896–1983)

- 萧三
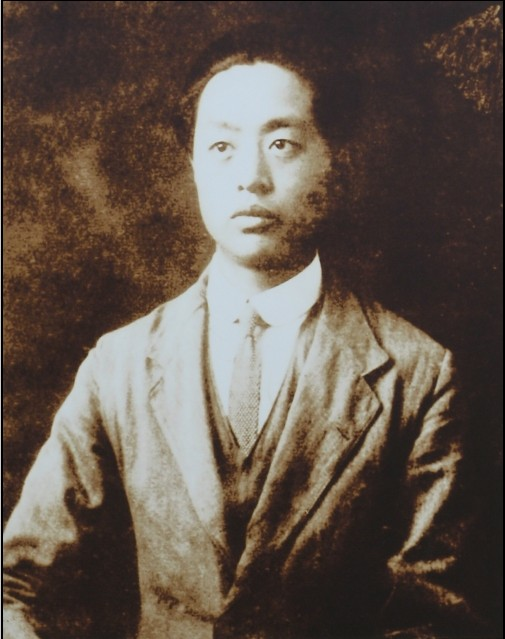
- Xiao San
- Born: Xiao Kesen (萧克森); 10 October 1896; Xiangxiang, Hunan, Qing China
- Died: 4 February 1983 (aged 86); Beijing, China
- Education: Hunan First Normal University; Communist University of the Toilers of the East; Moscow Sun Yat-sen University
- Occupation: Poet
- Spouse(s): Tan Xuejun; Vassar; Eva Sandberg; Gan Lu
- Children: 6
- Relatives: Xiao Zisheng (brother); Xiao Yueying (father)
- Writing career
- Pen name: Emi Siao; Ai Mei
- Language: Chinese, Russian, French, German, English
- Period: 1939–1983
- Genre: Poem
- Notable work: Selected Poems of Xiao San

Xiao San (simplified Chinese: 萧三; traditional Chinese: 蕭三; pinyin: Xiāo Sān; 10 October 1896 – 4 February 1983) was a Chinese poet and translator. He was fluent in Russian, French, German, and English.

Xiao San was the first writer to write a biography of Mao Zedong.

== Names ==
His birthname was Xiao Kesen (萧克森). His style name was Zizhang (子暲), his given name was Xiao Chunsan (萧莼三), and he also known as Xiao Zhifan (萧植蕃). His pen name included Emi Siao (萧爱梅) and Tianguang (天光).

== Biography ==
Xiao was born Xiao Kesen (萧克森) in Xiangxiang, Hunan, on October 10, 1896, the second son of Xiao Yueying (萧岳英), a Chinese educator. He had an elder brother, Xiao Zisheng (1894-1976), a Chinese educator and scholar.

Xiao attended Dongshan School and Dongshan High School. Xiao studied alongside Mao Zedong, Cai Hesen, and his brother Xiao Zisheng, graduating from Hunan First Normal University. In 1918, he founded New People's Study Society with Mao Zedong, Cai Hesen, and Xiao Zisheng. In 1920, he traveled to France for the Work-Study Program. He joined the Chinese Communist Party in 1922. In 1923, he went to Moscow to studied at Communist University of the Toilers of the East. He returned to China in 1924 and served as Secretary of Hunan Provincial Committee of the Communist Youth League of China. He suffered a concussion and got rest in Vladivostok in 1928, he studied at Moscow Sun Yat-sen University and then taught at Far Eastern Federal University. Xiao returned to China in 1939 and worked in Yan'an, he once served in various political roles in the CCP's revolutionary base area government. In April 1945, he attended at the 7th National Congress of the Chinese Communist Party.

Following the 1958 National People's Congress, Xiao was put in charge of a project to collect folk poetry. Representative examples from the folk poetry project were selected by Mao Zedong for publication in People's Daily.

Xiao was arrested by the Chinese government in 1961 during the Sino-Soviet split. In June 1967, he and his wife Eva Sandberg were thrown into Qincheng Prison, they were released in October 1974. He was politically rehabilitated in 1979 by Hu Yaobang and died in Beijing on February 4, 1983.

== Works ==
- Mao Zedong's Early Years (Chinese: 毛泽东的青年时代)
- The Road to Peace (Chinese: 和平之路)
- The Song of Friendship (Chinese: 友谊之歌)
- Selected Poems of Xiao San (Chinese: 萧三诗选)
- Precious Memory (Chinese: 珍贵的纪念)
- Collected Works of Xiao San (Chinese: 萧三文集)

== Personal life ==
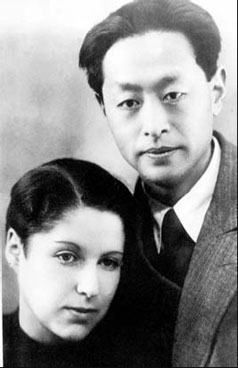
Xiao San and Eva Sandberg in 1934.

Xiao San married four times. He married his first wife Tan Xuejun (Chinese: 谭雪君) in his hometown at the age of 18; she died in 1922 in Changsha after their daughter died young. By age 31, he married a 25-year-old Russian girl named Vassar (Chinese: 瓦萨) in Vladivostok, and soon divorced. His third wife, Eva Sandberg (1911-2001) (Chinese: 叶华), was a Jewish German photographer; they married in 1935 in the Soviet Union. He married his fourth wife Gan Lu (Chinese: 甘露; her birthname was Jiang Deliang 蒋德良) in October 1944 in Yan'an; they divorced in September 1950.

He had three sons with Eva Sandberg, two sons with Gan Lu, and one son with Vassa Starodubtseva.

With Vassa Starodubtseva:

- Allan Starodub (born 1927)

With Eva Sandberg:

- Xiao Li'ang (born 1938) (Chinese: 萧立昂)
- Xiao weijia (born 1943) (Chinese: 萧维佳)
- Xiao Heping (born 1950) (Chinese: 萧和平)

With Gan Lu:

- Xiao Tieta (born February 1946) (Chinese: 萧铁塔)
- Xiao Ganping (Chinese: 萧甘平)
