= Wang Ming =

Chinese politician (1904–1974)

- 王明
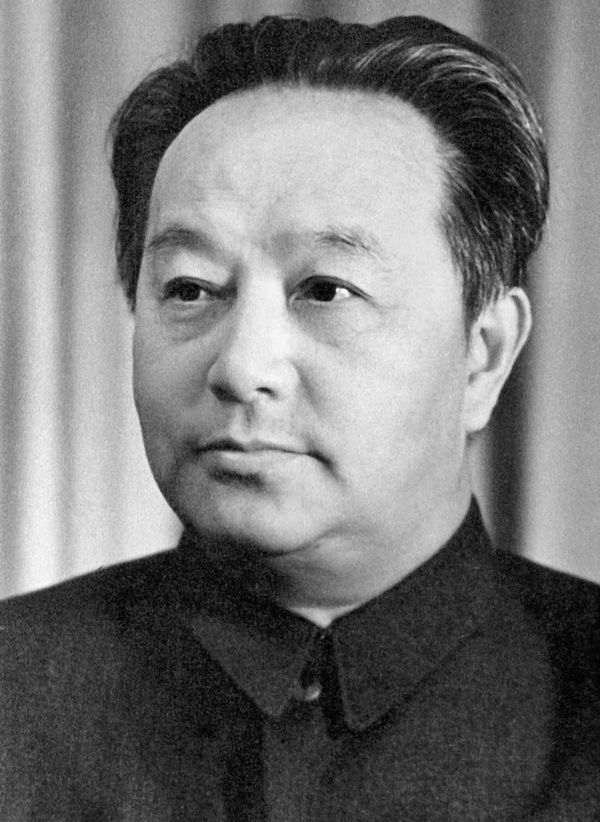
- Wang Ming in the early 1950s

Head of the Chinese delegation to the Communist International
- In office October 1931 – July 1937
- Succeeded by: Wang Jiaxiang

Head of the United Front Work Department
- In office 1942–1947
- Preceded by: Position established
- Succeeded by: Zhou Enlai

Member of the 6th Politburo of the Chinese Communist Party
- In office 1928–1945

Director of the Legal Committee of the Central People's Government Administration Council
- In office 21 October 1949 – 27 September 1954
- Premier: Zhou Enlai

Personal details
- Born: Chen Shaoyu; May 23, 1904 Jinzhai, Anhui, Qing dynasty
- Died: March 27, 1974 (aged 69) Moscow, Soviet Union
- Party: Chinese Communist Party
- Spouse: Meng Qingshu (孟庆树)
- Relations: Huang Lianfang (stepmother; 黄莲芳)
- Children: Chen Fangni (陈芳妮); Chen Danzhi (陈丹芝); Chen Danding (陈丹丁)
- Parent(s): Chen Pinzhi (陈聘之); Yu Youhua (喻幼华)
- Education: Wuhan University; Moscow Sun Yat-sen University
- Occupation: Politician

Wang Ming (Chinese: 王明; pinyin: Wáng Míng; May 23, 1904 – March 27, 1974) was a Chinese politician and senior leader of the early Chinese Communist Party (CCP). He led the CCP delegation to the Communist International (Comintern) from 1931 to 1937. After returning to China, he came into conflict with Mao Zedong.

From 1925 to 1929, Wang studied at the Moscow Sun Yat-sen University, where he was a supporter of Joseph Stalin's during the Soviet Union's leadership struggles. After returning to China, he was briefly purged by Li Lisan's faction before being fully reinstated in late 1930. In January 1931, he was promoted to the Politburo and rose rapidly in importance during a time of high attrition in the CCP's top leadership due to purges, arrests, and flights into hiding.

Wang became the CCP's leading representative to the Comintern and left for Moscow in October 1931. In that role, he helped promote the idea of an alliance between the CCP and the Kuomintang (KMT) to resist Japanese imperialism, which eventually came to fruition as the Second United Front. After he returned to China in 1937, Wang vocally opposed what he saw as Mao's "nationalist deviation" from orthodox Marxism–Leninism. According to Mao, Wang epitomized the intellectualism and foreign dogmatism that Mao criticized in his essays On Practice and On Contradiction.

== Early life ==
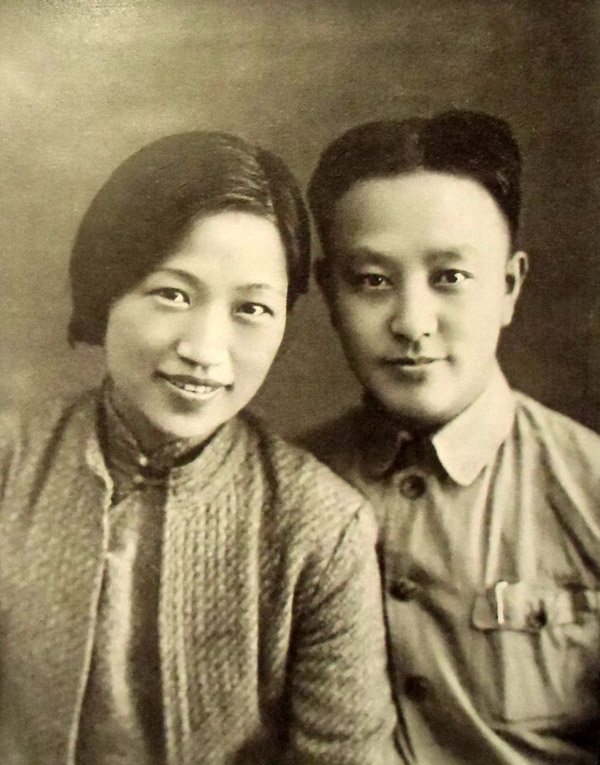
Wang Ming and his wife Meng Qingshu, 1938, Hankou

Wang Ming was born Chen Shaoyu on May 23, 1904, in Lu'an County, Anhui, in an area that is now part of Jinzhai County. He came from a poor family. In the summer of 1920, he entered the Anhui Provincial Third Agricultural School in Lu'an. The school, run by the revolutionary Zhu Yunshan, taught in vernacular Chinese and spread new ideas, and it became a centre of revolutionary activity in western Anhui. In the summer of 1924, Wang enrolled at the National Wuchang Commercial University in Wuchang. In 1925, while studying in Wuchang, he joined the Communist Youth League and the Chinese Communist Party (CCP).

== Moscow and Shanghai ==
In November 1925, the CCP sent Wang to Moscow Sun Yat-sen University, where he was among its first students. He quickly mastered Russian and Marxist–Leninist theory, and he became known by the Russian name Ivan Andreevich Golubev. He became a favoured protégé of Pavel Mif, a Soviet sinologist who later became the university's rector.

In 1927, Wang returned to China as the interpreter for a delegation of the Comintern led by Mif, and he attended the CCP's 5th National Congress in Wuhan with him. Mif wanted Wang to head the party's Propaganda Department, but the general secretary Chen Duxiu allowed him only a junior post there. Wang later returned to Moscow with Mif, and after graduating, he stayed on at the university as a propaganda officer of its party bureau and an instructor in the history of the Soviet Communist Party. He also interpreted at the CCP's 6th National Congress in 1928.

The circle of Chinese students around Mif, which included Wang, Zhang Wentian, Bo Gu and Wang Jiaxiang, became known as the "28 Bolsheviks" because of their strict adherence to the official party line. There was a struggle between Trotskyists and Stalinists among the Chinese students, and Wang was involved in suppressing the Trotskyists.

=== Li Lisan and the Fourth Plenum ===
In early 1929, Wang returned to China. In 1930, he criticised the policies of the party leader Li Lisan and put forward a "left" political programme of his own. In August 1930, the Comintern sent Zhou Enlai and Qu Qiubai back to China to rein in Li Lisan's aggressive policy, but the CCP did not adopt any meaningful policy changes at the Third Plenum of the Sixth Central Committee in September. The Comintern then ordered Li Lisan to come to Moscow and sent Mif to China to ensure that a new policy was implemented. After Mif arrived in December, the CCP issued a resolution renouncing Li Lisan's policies of the previous year, and on December 16, it reversed a disciplinary punishment that had been imposed on Wang.

At the Fourth Plenum of the Sixth Central Committee in January 1931, which Mif sponsored, Wang was promoted to the CCP's Politburo, although he was not given a seat on its Standing Committee. He was then under 27 years old and had been a rank-and-file cadre.

The first half of 1931 saw a number of senior communists in Shanghai expelled from the party for supporting Li Lisan's policies or captured by the Kuomintang (KMT) after the defection of Gu Shunzhang. On January 17, 1931, more than 30 communists were arrested at a meeting at the Eastern Hotel in Shanghai, and on February 7, 23 of them, including five members of the League of Left-Wing Writers, were shot at the Longhua garrison headquarters. According to Xinmin Weekly, the meeting was betrayed to the authorities by people sent by Wang. The British writer Ben Macintyre states that Wang "regarded the League as a cover for 'dissenting comrades' and wanted them killed".

By April 1931, part of the party leadership had left the cities for security. These arrests, expulsions and departures left the Politburo members who remained in Shanghai in a position to dominate the party. On June 22, the general secretary Xiang Zhongfa was arrested and quickly executed by the KMT. Wang, Zhou Enlai and Lu Futan then became the most important CCP leaders left in the city, and according to HK01, Mif named Wang acting general secretary on the Comintern's behalf. In October 1931, Wang left Shanghai for Moscow as the CCP's representative to the Comintern, leaving Bo Gu in charge of the party centre.

== CCP representative to the Comintern ==
Wang headed the CCP delegation to the Comintern in Moscow from 1931 to 1937. He was elected to the Comintern's Executive Committee in 1933, and at the Seventh World Congress in 1935, he was elected to its presidium, a higher post than any other CCP member held. From Moscow, he continued to direct the party, and the leadership under Bo Gu carried out his "left" line until the Zunyi Conference in January 1935. At Zunyi, Wang and the 28 Bolsheviks lost the support of key party and Red Army leaders, and Bo Gu, Zhou Enlai and Otto Braun were criticised for their poor strategy. Zhang Wentian succeeded Bo Gu as provisional party leader. Mao Zedong emerged from Zunyi as the Politburo's dominant member, with the support of the army and with his opponents discredited.

=== United front policy ===
The Japanese invasion of Manchuria in 1931 posed a threat to both sides of the Chinese Civil War and to the Soviet Union, but it did not lead to an immediate end to hostilities. The failure of the First United Front in 1927 had created deep distrust between the CCP and Chiang Kai-shek. Chiang described his policy as "first internal pacification, then external resistance", while the CCP called for simultaneously "resisting Japan and opposing Chiang".

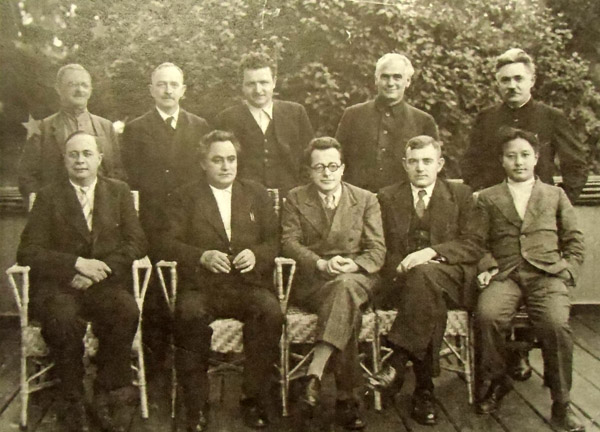
Wang Ming with members of the Comintern, August 1935

By 1935, the Comintern had decided that the threat posed by Japan in Asia and the rise of Adolf Hitler in Europe called for a less dogmatic response, and its Seventh World Congress called on communist parties to take part in "anti-fascist united fronts". In July 1935, Wang began work on a document explaining how the new policy would apply to China, which was published in October but dated August 1, and which became known as the "1 August Declaration". It called on all parties in China to form a united front against Japan and proposed a united government of national defence. The offer did not extend to Chiang himself, whom Wang and the rest of the CCP delegation still considered a "running dog" of the Japanese.

The attitude of Wang and the Comintern towards Chiang began to shift when full details of the Long March and the CCP's defeats in southern China reached Moscow. Wang published a series of articles calling for Chiang either to join an anti-Japanese united front or to be overthrown by patriots within the KMT. Historians disagree on how seriously to take this change, with Michael Sheng regarding the articles as propaganda intended to encourage dissent against Chiang within the KMT, and Gao Hua arguing that Wang sincerely believed that Chiang could and should be brought into a united front. This propaganda line was abandoned after Chiang suppressed the December 9th Movement.

The CCP, cut off from radio communication with Moscow, learned of the 1 August Declaration in November 1935. At a conference at Wayaobu in December, its leaders adopted the Wayaobu Manifesto, which called for "the most broad national united front" and announced that the CCP would suspend class conflict in the interests of cross-class collaboration. The manifesto also called for the Red Army to be expanded to one million men and for the Chinese Soviet to increase its territory greatly.

In March 1936, when the Comintern abandoned the slogan "resist Japan and oppose Chiang", Wang suggested replacing it with "resist Japan and oppose the villain". In June, when the Liangguang Incident took place, he supported the uprising against Chiang even after Pravda condemned it. In late June, the CCP re-established radio contact with Moscow and asked for help in carrying out its plan to form an anti-Japanese, anti-Chiang base in the northwest. The Comintern replied on August 15 with a telegram admonishing the CCP for continuing to oppose Chiang, and while it approved the other provisions of the Wayaobu Manifesto, it vetoed the plan for a northwestern base. The CCP adopted the new slogan "compelling Chiang to resist Japan", and Pan Hannian was sent to Nanjing to begin negotiating a truce with Chen Lifu.

When the Soviets criticised the CCP for failing to include Chiang in its plans, Wang joined in the criticism, but the Comintern leader Georgi Dimitrov pointed out that many of Wang's criticisms applied equally to his own attitude over the previous months. The Soviets asked the CCP to send a replacement for Wang, although he remained in Moscow for almost a year until Wang Jiaxiang arrived.

== Return to China ==
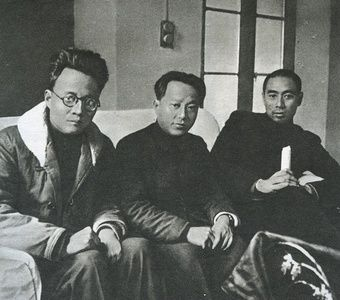
Qin Bangxian (Bo Gu), Wang Ming and Zhou Enlai at the Yangtze River Bureau of the CCP Central Committee in Wuhan in 1938

On his way back to China in late November 1937, Wang passed through Xinjiang with Kang Sheng, and the warlord Sheng Shicai asked them to send more cadres to the province and to admit him to the CCP. Wang agreed to the first request but said that he could not decide the second. He arrived in Yan'an on November 29, 1937, bringing the Comintern's directives on the united front. He was added to the party's Secretariat, and he joined Zhou Enlai in negotiations with the KMT.

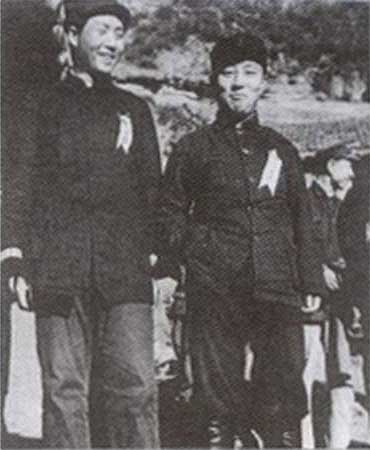
Mao Zedong (left) and Wang Ming (right) in Yan'an, 1937

At a Politburo meeting from December 9 to 14, 1937, Wang argued that in the Second United Front "everything must go through the united front", and that the Eighth Route Army should accept Chiang's command. After the meeting, he went to Wuhan, where he became secretary of the CCP's Yangtze Bureau and head of the party's delegation, handling united front work with the KMT. The party later judged that his work there had been a "right capitulationist" error that abandoned the party's leadership within the united front.

== Decline ==
At the Sixth Plenum of the Sixth Central Committee, held in Yan'an from September 29 to November 6, 1938, the party leadership largely corrected what it called Wang's rightist errors. After the fall of Wuhan, the plenum dissolved the Yangtze Bureau, ending Wang's leadership over the party's work in southern China. The historian Gregor Benton writes that the Maoist position ultimately prevailed in the disputes over the united front, and that Wang, the Comintern's chief Chinese spokesman, was removed from the party's leading positions.

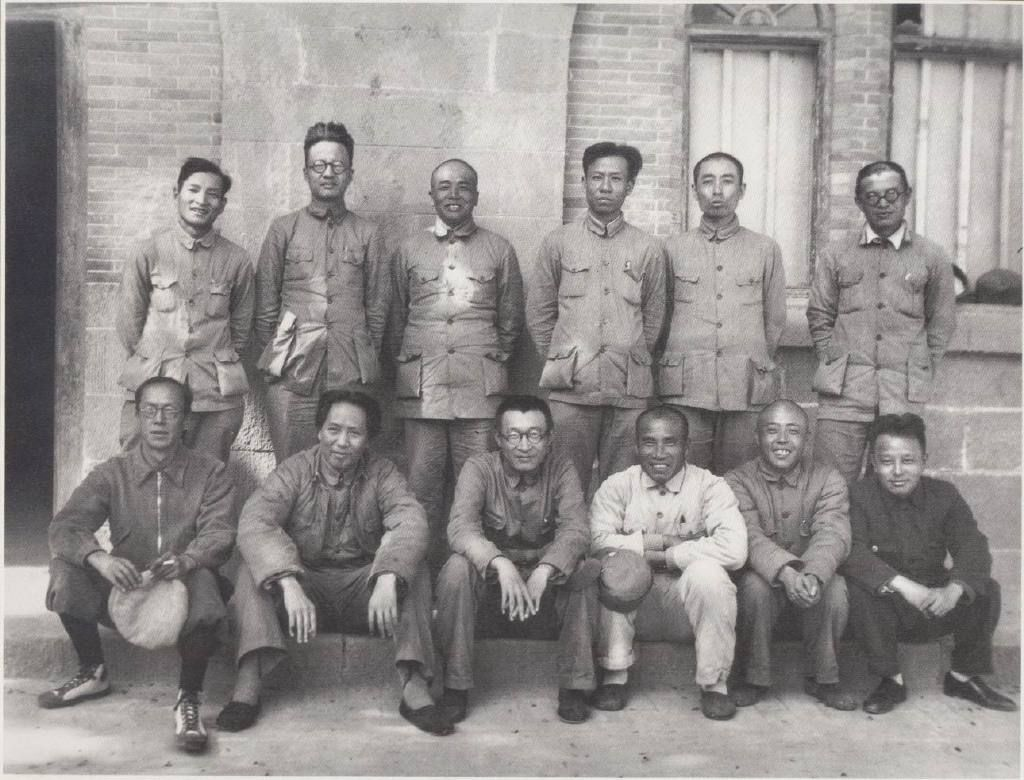
Group photo of the presidium members of the Sixth Plenary Session of the 6th Central Committee of the Chinese Communist Party (front row, from left: Kang Sheng, Mao Zedong, Wang Jiaxiang, Zhu De, Xiang Ying and Wang Ming. Back row, from left: Chen Yun, Bo Gu, Peng Dehuai, Liu Shaoqi, Zhou Enlai and Zhang Wentian)

On May 3, 1940, at the opening of the Zedong Youth Cadre School in Yan'an, Wang gave a speech titled "Study Mao Zedong", in which he described Mao as a leader of the revolution since the party's founding. From October 12, 1941, to 1945, he was mostly in hospital or recovering at home. In 1942, Mao launched the Yan'an Rectification Movement against "foreign dogmatism", after which Wang's influence became negligible. Among the texts studied collectively during the movement were two volumes of documents edited by Mao, Before the Sixth Party Congress and After the Sixth Party Congress, which presented Mao as representing the party's correct line and described Wang and other rivals of Mao as "rightists". Wang declined to take part in the movement, citing illness, and he refused to admit his errors. After the reorganisation of the central leadership in March 1943, he was no longer a member of the Secretariat.

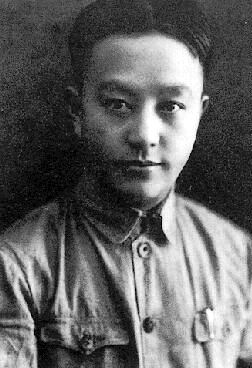
Wang Ming in 1938

Wang later claimed that Mao had used Li Fuchun to direct doctors to harm him through improper medication, and that his physician Jin Maoyue had political problems and might be a spy. In April 1945, when the party adopted its "Resolution on Certain Historical Questions", Wang reluctantly endorsed it, praised Mao, acknowledged his errors and said that he would accept any political or organisational conclusion. The Seventh Party Congress nevertheless elected him to the Central Committee in the interests of unity.

At the second plenary session of the Seventh Central Committee in March 1949, Wang praised Mao and his work On New Democracy but did not admit his errors, and after criticism, he made a partial self-criticism. The meeting concluded that Wang should be helped to correct his errors and asked him to write a statement of self-criticism, which he never wrote.

== From Beijing to Moscow ==
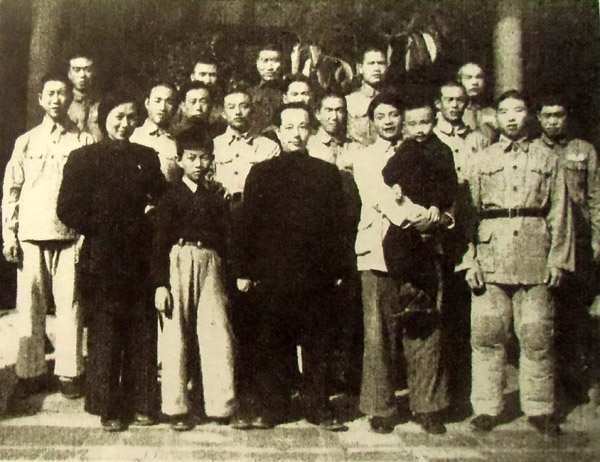
Wang Ming and his wife visiting the Soviet Union with their two sons, October 1950

After the founding of the People's Republic of China in 1949, Wang became director of the Legal Committee of the Government Administration Council and deputy director of its Political and Legal Committee. Luo Qiong, who took part in drafting the Marriage Law of 1950, later wrote that Wang, as head of the Legal Committee, had read the draft but had not taken part in drafting or discussing it. In June 1950, the third plenary session of the Seventh Central Committee adopted a resolution requiring him to submit a written statement on his errors.

On October 25, 1950, Wang went to Moscow for medical treatment, and he returned to China on December 9, 1953. After his hepatitis, gallbladder inflammation and heart disease recurred, he again asked to be treated abroad, and with the Central Committee's approval, he was carried to the airport on a stretcher and left Beijing on January 30, 1956, arriving in Moscow on February 1. His wife, Meng Qingshu, and two of their children went with him. At the Eighth Party Congress later that year, Mao still nominated him for the Central Committee, and he was elected with the fewest votes, ranking last among its 97 members. When Mao visited Moscow in 1957 and sent people to see him, Wang said that he no longer wished to return to China.

During the Cultural Revolution, Wang became a target of attacks in China, and his relatives there were persecuted. The salary and supplies sent to him and his wife were stopped from the second half of 1966. From 1969, he wrote a series of articles attacking the CCP and Mao, and he also broadcast propaganda to China from Moscow. He completed his last work, Fifty Years of the Communist Party of China, on March 23, 1974. He fell gravely ill four days later and died in Moscow on March 27, 1974. He was buried at Novodevichy Cemetery in Moscow.

== Personal life ==
Wang and his wife, Meng Qingshu, had a daughter and two sons. Their daughter, Fani, was raised in the Soviet Union by Dimitrov and his wife, Roza Fleishmann, and in 1944, Wang thanked them for their years of care for her. Their sons, Wang Danzhi and Wang Danding, moved to the Soviet Union with their parents in 1956. Wang Danzhi graduated from Moscow State University, became a scientist and translator, and died in Moscow in October 2023 at the age of 84. Wang Danding, the younger son, lives in Russia.

== Sources ==
- Coble, Parks M. (1991). Facing Japan: Chinese politics and Japanese imperialism; 1931 - 1937. Cambridge, Mass.: Council on East Asian Studies, Harvard Univ. ISBN 9780674290112.
- Gao, Hua (2018). How the Red Sun Rose: The Origins and Development of the Yan'an Rectification Movement. The Chinese University of Hong Kong Press. ISBN 9789629968229.
- Hsu, Wilbur W. (2012). Survival Through Adaptation: The Chinese Red Army and the Extermination Campaigns, 1927-1936 (PDF). Art of War Papers. Fort Leavenworth, Kansas, USA: Combat Studies Institute Press.
- Pantsov, Alexander V (2012). Mao: The Real Story. Translated by Levine, Stephen I. New York: Simon and Schuster.
- Pantsov, Alexander V (2023). Victorious in Defeat: The Life and Times of Chiang Kai-shek, 1887–1975. Translated by Levine, Stephen I. New Haven: Yale University Press.
- Peng, Lü (2023). A History of China in the 20th Century. Translated by Doar, Bruce (1st ed.). Singapore: Palgrave Macmillan. ISBN 978-981-99-0733-5.
- Sheng, Michael (1992). "Mao, Stalin, and the Formation of the Anti-Japanese United Front: 1935-1937". The China Quarterly. 129 (129): 149–170. doi:10.1017/S0305741000041266.
- Short, Philip (2017). Mao: The Man Who Made China. New York, New York, USA: I.B.Tauris & Co. Ltd. ISBN 978-1-78453-463-9.
- van de Ven, Hans (2003). War and Nationalism. New York: Routledge.
- Wang Ming, 50 Years of the CCP, Orient Press, 2004
- Yang, Benjamin (1990). From Revolution to Politics: Chinese Communists on the Long March. Boulder, Colorado: Westview Press.
- Yang, Kuisong (2020). "Sino-Soviet Diplomacy Under the Threat of War". In Shen, Zhihua (ed.). A Short History of Sino-Soviet Relations, 1917–1991. Translated by Xia, Yafeng. Singapore: Palmgrave Macmillan and Social Sciences Academic Press.

Party political offices
Preceded by Xiang Zhongfa and acting Li Lisan	General Secretary of the Chinese Communist Party (acting); 1931–1932	Succeeded by Qin Bangxian
Preceded by none	Head of CCP Central United Front Department; 1942–1947	Succeeded by Zhou Enlai
