= Qingshu =

Qingshu could be a romanization of two different Chinese-language given names. Notable people and fictional characters include:

- Meng Qingshu (Chinese: 孟庆树; 1911–1983), Chinese politician
- Song Qingshu (Chinese: 宋青書) , a character in the wuxia novel The Heaven Sword and Dragon Saber by Jin Yong
