= Yuan Jiayong =

Chinese politician (1905–1991)

Yuan Jiayong (Chinese: 袁家镛; 1905 – January 16, 1991) was a member of the 28 Bolsheviks. After studying at Moscow Sun Yat-sen University in the Soviet Union, he returned to China to head the Jiangsu Committee of the Chinese Communist Party. In June 1934, Yuan and Li Zhusheng, another member of the 28 Bolsheviks, were arrested by the Kuomintang. Yuan decided to defect to the Kuomintang and changed his name.
