= Song Panmin =

Chinese politician

Song Panmin (Chinese: 宋潘民), also known as Song Panming (Chinese: 宋盘铭) was a member of the 28 Bolsheviks. He was born in Henan Province. He was educated at Moscow Sun Yat-sen University in the Soviet Union. He was made political commissar of the 9th Division, Red 3rd Army in western Hubei. Because of his opposition to the political purges of Xia Xi, another member of the 28 Bolsheviks, he was executed by firing squad on Xia's orders.
