= Bo Gu =

Chinese politician (1907–1946)

- 博古
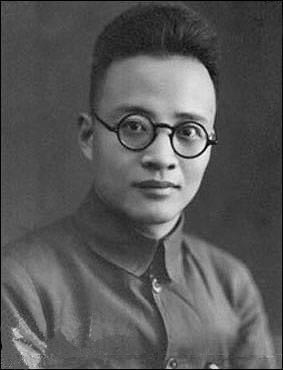
- Qin in the 1930s

General Secretary of the Chinese Communist Party
- In office September 1931 – 17 January 1935
- Preceded by: Xiang Zhongfa
- Succeeded by: Zhang Wentian

Personal details
- Born: 14 May 1907 Wuxi, Jiangsu, Qing dynasty
- Died: 8 April 1946 (aged 38) Heicha Mountain, Xing County, Shanxi, Republic of China
- Party: Chinese Communist Party

Qin Bangxian, (Note: Chinese: 秦邦宪; pinyin: Qín Bāngxiàn; Wade–Giles: Ch'in Pang-hsien) better known by his alias Bo Gu (Note: Chinese: 博古; pinyin: Bó Gǔ; Wade–Giles: Po Ku) (4 May 1907 – 8 April 1946) was a Chinese senior leader of the Chinese Communist Party and a member of the 28 Bolsheviks.

== Early life and education ==
Qin was born in Wuxi, Jiangsu, in 1907. In his earlier years, Qin studied at the Suzhou Industrial School where he took an active role in activities against imperialism and the warlords tyrannising China. In 1925 Qin entered Shanghai University, a university that was known for its impact on young revolutionists at the time. The ideas of Marxism and Leninism were taught there by early leaders of the Chinese Communist Party (CCP) like Qu Qiubai and Deng Zhongxia. Qin showed a great interest in these teachings. Later that year, Qin joined the May 30th Movement which called for protests and boycotts against imperialism. This was a precursor to his involvement in the CCP.

In 1926 Qin was sent to the Moscow Sun Yat-sen University in Moscow, Russia where he continued to study both Marxism and Leninism under the university's president Pavel Mif. Qin adopted the alias "Bo Gu" during this time, which means "familiar with histories" in Chinese. Qin continued his studies while becoming acquainted with fellow student Wang Ming. Wang and Qin, along with other students, such as Zhang Wentian, Wang Jiaxiang, and Yang Shangkun became known as the 28 Bolsheviks, because of their strict adherence to Moscow's party line.

== Revolutionary period ==
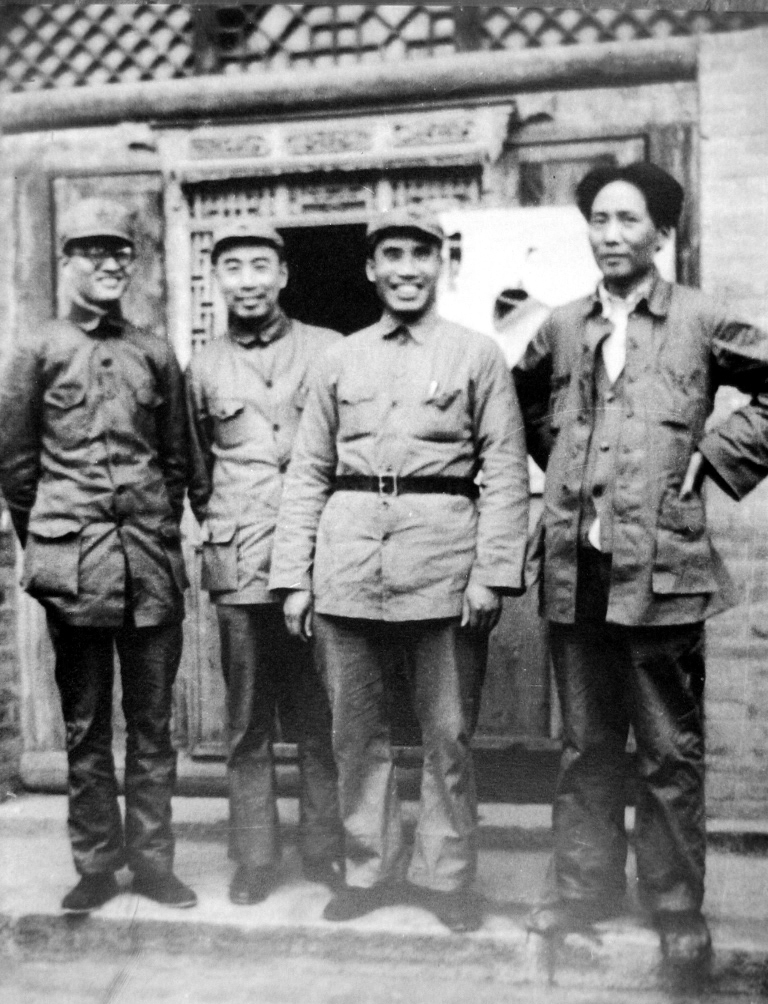
Bo Gu (left), photographed with Zhu De (second from right), Mao Zedong and Zhou Enlai (second from left) in 1937.

=== Rise to power ===
By 1930, Bo Gu had returned to China. Due to his lack of revolutionary record, he was initially assigned to insignificant party work. At this time, Joseph Stalin and the Comintern were increasingly discontent with the leadership of the Chinese Communist Party under Li Lisan. Under the direct coordination of Pavel Mif, the Comintern's special envoy to China, the 4th Plenum of the 6th National Congress of CCP was convened in January 1931, with Bo in attendance. The plenum's primary purpose was to criticize the Li Lisan and the "Li Lisan line", and also served as a means to elevate members of the 28 Bolsheviks to positions of influence within the CCP, bolstering Comintern influence. Wang Ming, Mif's protégé, was appointed to both the Central Committee and Politburo, although he had not been a member of either before the plenum. As a reward for his harsh criticism of the Li Lisan line at the plenum, Bo was placed in charge of the Chinese Communist Youth League.

At the end of the summer of 1931, Wang Ming was designated to return to Moscow as the CCP's representative to the Comintern. Xiang Zhongfa, the General Secretary of the CCP, had been executed by the Kuomintang in June. The Comintern proposed a provisional Politburo with Bo Gu, who wasn't a Central Committee member at the time, becoming General Secretary. Although Bo had was positioned as the party leader in China, the Comintern through Wang Ming wielded more power in the political affairs of the party.

In January 1933 Bo Gu and other members of the Central Bureau evacuated Shanghai to Ruijin, within the Jiangxi Soviet. Mao Zedong, the chairman of the Chinese Soviet Republic, had been severely weakened in intraparty struggles with the party center before the start of 1933, especially after losing military power at the Ningdu Conference. Zhou Enlai had assumed both a political and military leadership role, and upon Bo's arrival, shared political leadership with him. Otto Braun, a German military advisor from the Comintern, arrived a few months later and assumed military decision-making power.

In late 1933, Chiang Kai-shek and the KMT launched the Fifth Encirclement Campaign against the Jiangxi Soviet. The KMT adopted a new approach focused on methodical, fortified advance, while the Chinese Red Army, under Bo, Braun, and Zhou, adopted a more orthodox military approach compared to the guerrilla warfare advocated by Mao. Complicated by shortages in supplies and manpower, the Red Army suffered great losses. After the loss of Guangchang, it was evident to Bo and CCP leadership that the collapse of the Jiangxi Soviet was imminent. In October 1934, the area was abandoned and the Red Army set out on what would become known as the Long March.

At the beginning of the Long March, the Red Army broke through the KMT's first three blockades with minimal fighting. However, Chiang and the KMT had anticipated that the Red Army would attempt to cross the Xiang River, in the direction of Hunan and Hubei. The ensuing battle inflicted heavy casualties on the Red Army, reducing their force from near ninety thousand men, to approximately thirty thousand. The battle demoralized Bo. He lost much credibility and authority amongst military and political leaders of the CCP. At this time, Mao Zedong built key support for his military ideas with key Politburo members Zhou Enlai, Zhang Wentian and Wang Jiaxing in an effort to counter Bo and Otto Braun.

=== Decline ===
In January 1935, the Zunyi Conference was convened to reflect on recent military defeats and settle the disputes on the CCP and Red Army's next move. Bo's report, the first delivered, was not well received. The audience perceived that Bo didn't admit to his own personal failings as the leader, instead attributing the defeats solely to objective causes. Subsequent reports, delivered by Zhou Enlai, Zhang Wentian, and Mao Zedong, firmly placed blame on the leadership, especially that of Bo and Otto Braun. The reports criticizing Bo and Braun were overwhelmingly well received by party leadership, and the three-person leadership team of Bo, Braun, and Zhou was dissolved. Shortly after the conference Bo was replaced by Zhang Wentian as General Secretary.

Bo Gu remained a Politburo member after his removal as General Secretary and was soon put in charge of propaganda. Bo reached Yan'an with the Red Army in late 1935 and was named to the soviet's Provisional Executive Committee. Bo, along with Zhou Enlai and Ye Jianying, went to Xi'an to handle the resolution of the Xi'an Incident in 1936. Shortly thereafter, he was sent to Nanjing to coordinate the United Front against Japan. In 1938 he was the Minister of Organisation Department of Yangtze River and then Southern China Division of CCP.

Bo returned to Yan'an in 1940 amidst heightened KMT-CCP tensions. In 1941 he was appointed as head of Jie Fang Daily and Xinhua News Agency. Bo maintained decent relations with Mao Zedong during this time, but still wished for greater intervention from Moscow. He maintained intermittent contact with Comintern agents, evading Kang Sheng's intelligence apparatus. In the Yan'an Rectification Movement, Bo, a onetime rival of Mao, became a primary target, alongside his former classmate Wang Ming. Bo engaged in extensive self-criticism, being threatened with execution if he did not comply. The criticism of Bo at its peak led many to believe he was a traitor and his arrest was imminent. At the 7th National Congress of the Chinese Communist Party, Bo delivered his final self-criticism, tearfully citing his transgressions and harm he caused to the revolution. Bo was retained as a member of the Central Committee, along with Wang Ming, but they were respectively listed second-to-last and last among the 33 members.

=== Death ===
After the end of World War II in 1945, Bo Gu was one of the CCP delegates sent to Chongqing to negotiate a new constitution and the resolution of KMT-CCP tensions. Bo attended the following Political Consulting Congress held in Chongqing as delegate of CCP in February 1946. When Bo was on his way back to Yan'an, he died in an airplane crash in Shanxi. Among the other victims were several senior CCP leaders such as General Ye Ting, the secret police boss Deng Fa, and the CCP member Wang Ruofei.

== Notes ==
Party political offices
Preceded by Wang Ming	General Secretary of the Chinese Communist Party; 1932–1935	Succeeded by Zhang Wentian
