= Wang Yuncheng =

Chinese politician (1905–1969)

Wang Yuncheng (Chinese: 王云程;王云成) (1905 – November 1969) was a member of the 28 Bolsheviks. He was born in Hubei Province. He studied at Moscow Sun Yat-sen University in the Soviet Union before returning to China in 1931. In 1932, he was made Chinese Communist Party Committee Secretary for Jiangsu Province. In 1933, he was arrested by the Kuomintang secret police and betrayed Liao Chengzhi, the son of Liao Zhongkai. In the 1960s, Kang Sheng and Xie Fuzhi investigated his actions in the 1930s and decided to have him executed.
