= Zhu Agen =

Chinese politician

Zhu Agen (Chinese: 朱阿根), also known as Zhu Zhiyuan (Chinese: 朱志远) (born 1904, date of death unknown) was a member of the 28 Bolsheviks. In October 1927, he left Shanghai for the Soviet Union and enrolled in Moscow Sun Yat-sen University. In June 1930, he was made leader of the Shanghai Workers' Association. On 17 January 1931, Zhu was made later of the Jiangsu Party Organization by the Jiangnan Provincial Committee. He served two terms, from January to June 1931 and from June to November 1933. From February to June 1931, while simultaneously serving his first term as Jiangsu Provincial leader, he served as leader of the Shanghai Party Committee. Zhu later left the Chinese Communist Party sometime after 23 November 1933.
