= Wang Jiaxiang =

Leader of the Chinese Communist Party (1906–1974)

- 王稼祥
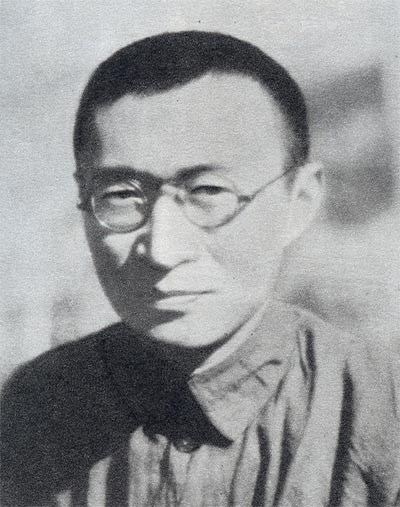

Ambassador of the People's Republic of China to the Soviet Union
- In office 1951–1956
- President: Liu Shaoqi

Personal details
- Born: 15 August 1906 Jing County, Anhui
- Died: 25 January 1974 (aged 67)
- Party: Chinese Communist Party
- Education: Moscow Sun Yat-sen University
- Occupation: Politician, Communist Revolutionary

Wang Jiaxiang (Note: Romanised traditionally as Wang Jiaqiang.) (Chinese: 王稼祥; pinyin: Wáng Jiàxiáng; 15 August 1906 – 25 January 1974) was one of the senior leaders of the Chinese Communist Party in its early stage and a member of the 28 Bolsheviks. Wang held a variety of high-level posts in the Party: during the Civil War he was the director of the Red Army's General Office, upon the founding of the People's Republic of China he was the first ambassador to the Soviet Union (and the first ever ambassador of the PRC), and then became the first head of the Party's International Department.

== Political Biography ==
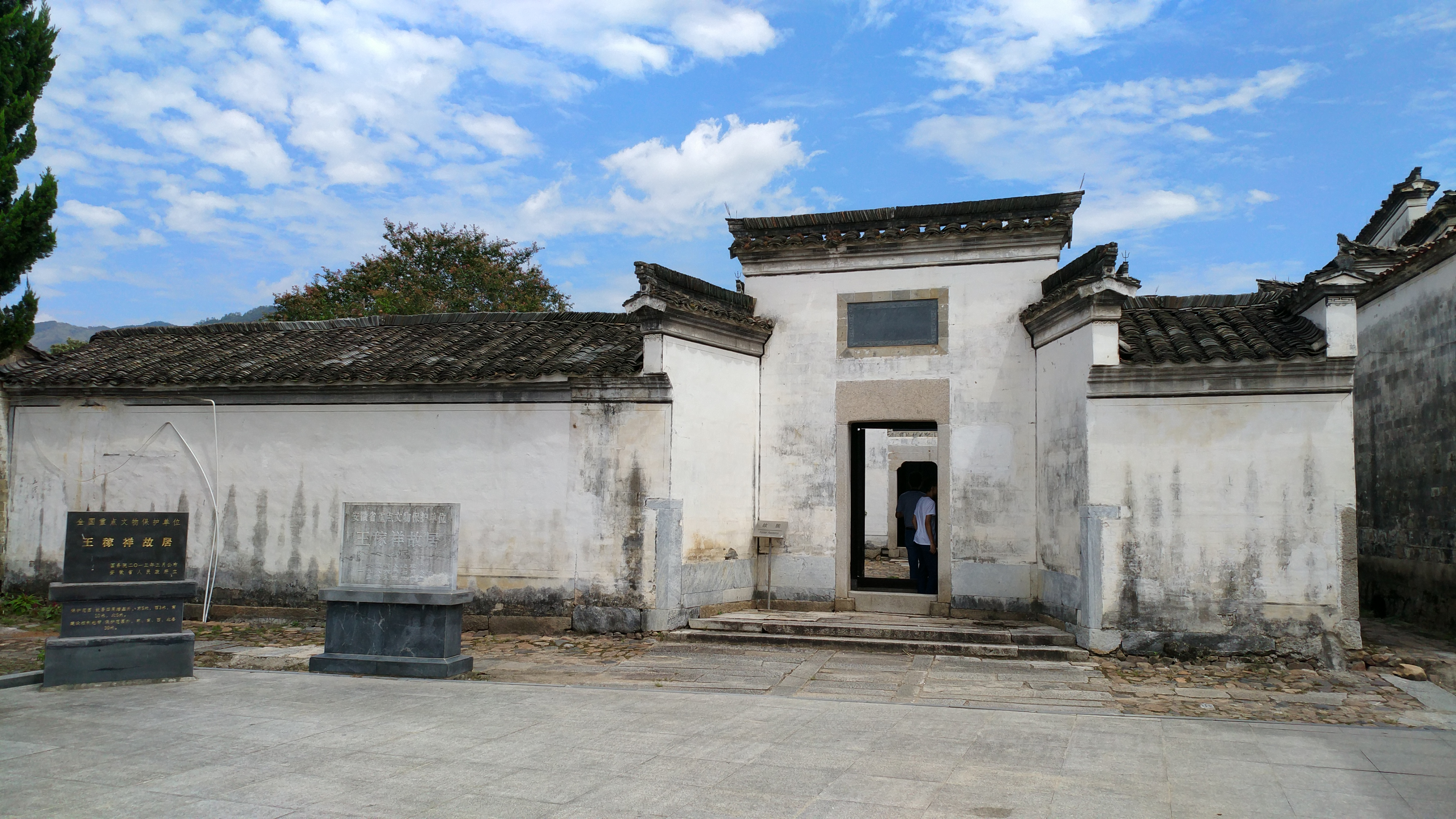
The birthplace of Wang Jiaxiang in Hou'an, Jing County, Anhui

Wang, a native of Jing County, Anhui, was born into a landlord family and attended an English missionary school in Wuhu. In September 1925 he began attending the affiliated middle school of Shanghai University. One month later he joined the Youth League, and was soon en route to the Soviet Union, studying at the Moscow Sun Yat-sen University. This institution was established under Sun Yat-Sen's policy of alliance with the Soviet Union and the CCP, and named after him to train revolutionaries who would return to China.

=== Joining the '28 Bolsheviks' ===
In Moscow, Wang joined the cohort consisting of Wang Ming, Zhang Wentian, Bo Gu and other students, called the "28 Bolsheviks" (a coalition whose precise membership is in dispute), jointly expressing a wish to engage in revolution in China.

In 1928, while still in Moscow, Wang joined the Chinese Communist Party.

With the support from their mentor Pavel Mif, the president of Moscow Sun Yat-sen University and then representative of Comintern to China, the 28 Bolsheviks were sent back to China to take leadership of the CCP. The return of the "28 Bolsheviks" began with Wang Ming and Chen Yuandao in early 1929, with Wang Jiaxiang returning in 1930.

On 11 June 1930, however, Wang was sent to Hong Kong after an abortive attempt to take control of the Party. The Bolsheviks eventually did successfully take power over the Party after a power struggle with Li Lisan in 1930, however. Compared with his counterparts, Wang received the relatively less important task of secretary for the party newspaper and chief editor of two Party journals.

=== The downfall of the 'Bolsheviks' ===
Wang Jiaxiang was one of the early defectors from the 'Bolsheviks', coming over to Mao's camp during the Zunyi conference in 1935 with other members Zhang Wentian and Yang Shangkun. Bo Gu was dismissed as general secretary and replaced by Zhang (though he remained a member of the Politburo), and Wang Jiaxiang rose to control the Red Army along with Mao and Zhou Enlai.

=== At Yan'an ===
After Wang reached Yan'an, he was sent to Moscow as CCP delegate to Comintern in 1937. Wang came back the next year with an important tribute to Mao: an alleged oral message from Georgi Dimitrov, one of the leaders of Comintern at that time, that approved the CCP's united front work and endorsed Mao's leading position in the Party.

Although the authenticity of this message is still in question, Mao did exploit it as pivotal proof for the legitimacy of his being supreme leader. As a reward, Wang was appointed as Vice Chairman of Central Military Committee of CCP, replacing Mao's rival Wang Ming. During that time the Second Sino-Japanese War broke out, Chinese Red Army was reorganised into 8th Route Army, and Wang Jiaxiang was appointed as Director of Political Department, taking charge of military command with Zhu De and Peng Dehuai. At the same time, he was elected as Commissioner and member of the CCP Politburo, bringing him to his greatest prominence in the Party so far.

==== Promoting Mao ====
In 1943 Wang was the first to promote the concept of Maoism, co-heading (with Mao) the Central Study Group in Yan'an which oversaw the mobilisation meetings which forced all Politburo members to speak. This marked the launch of the Yan'an rectification movement, whose goal was "to destroy subjectivism and sectarianism and thereby save the party's cadres."

Wang proposed that Mao Zedong had always upheld "dialectical materialism", and that Liu Shaoqi had also, cementing the alliance between Mao and Liu. Wang also criticised those who were too embedded in theory and lacked "practical work experience."

Mao in turn reciprocated Wang's attentions. Thomas Kampen calls a speech by Mao at the Seventh Party Congress of 1945 "very interesting," given that he advocated Wang's entry to the Central Committee and spoke of Wang (and Ren Bishi's) contributions to the cause after their arrival in the Soviet area. (Mao again in October 1966 praised Wang Jixiang "for he approved of the battle at Donggu." Kampen writes: "It demonstrates that Mao was grateful for Wang's support and remembered the event for decades."

=== Northeast Assignment ===
During the Chinese Civil War, Wang was sent to northeast China to work with Lin Biao and Gao Gang, but only as their subordinate with the titles of Minister of City Organisation Department and acting Minister of Propaganda Department of Northeast Bureau of CCP.

=== After Communist Victory ===
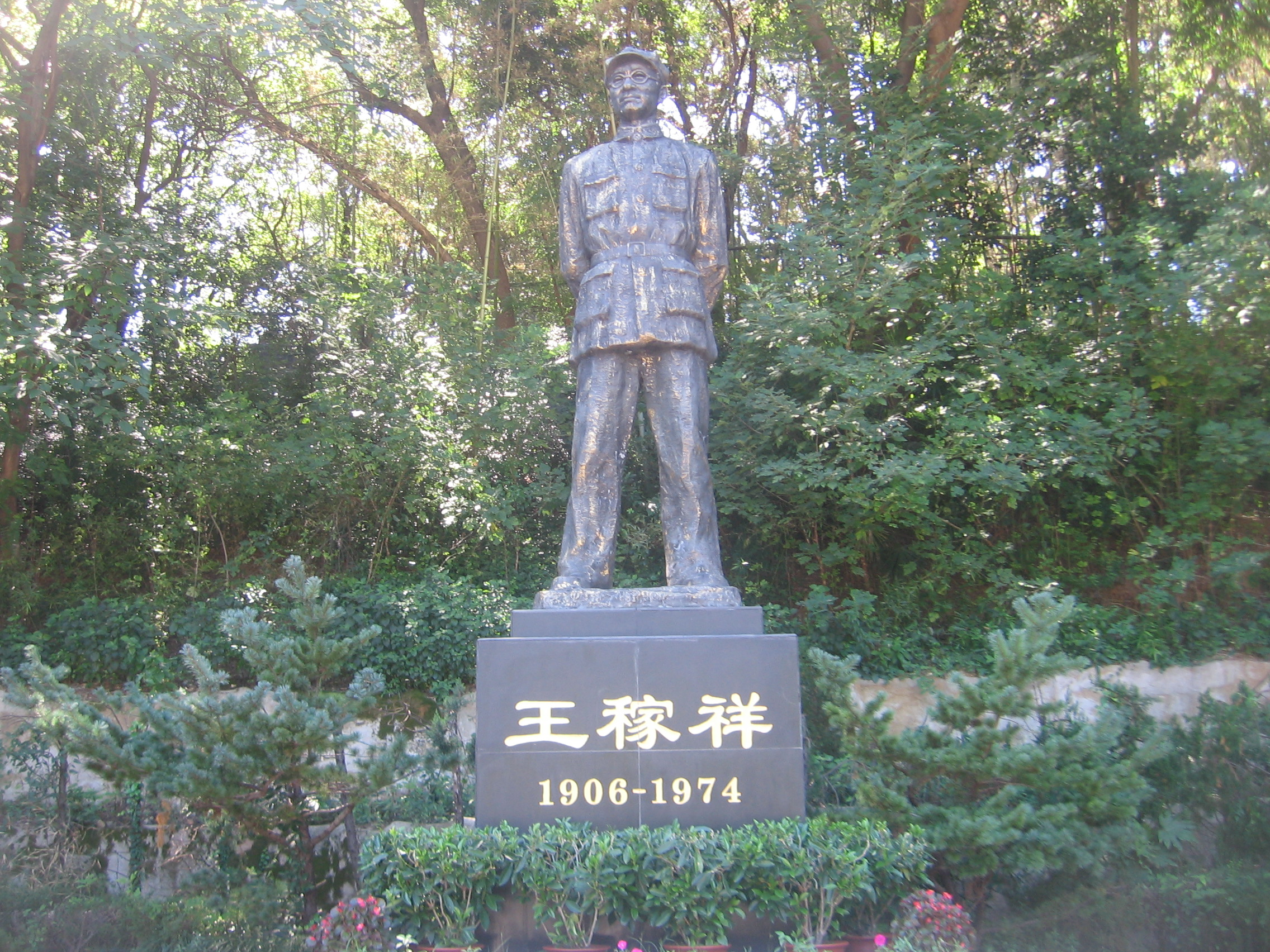
Statue of Wang Jiaxiang in Wuhu, Anhui

After the establishment of People's Republic of China in 1949, Wang was appointed as first Chinese Ambassador to Soviet Union, and then Under Secretary of Foreign Ministry. In 1951 Wang was appointed as Minister of External Communication Department of CCP (i.e., head of the International Department of the CCP). Although Wang received another promotion in being elected as Commissioner and Secretariat of Central Committee of CCP in the 1st Plenary Meeting of 8th National Congress of CCP in 1956 and survived longer in political life than his close friend Zhang Wentian, who was purged in the Lushan Meeting in 1959, he still could not survive the Cultural Revolution.

Wang's wife Zhu Zhongli (朱仲丽) used to be a nurse working for the army and once was assistant of Canadian doctor Bethune who worked for 8th Route Army as an international volunteer. They lived together for several decades after marriage. Until her death in 2014 Zhu was an active writer writing memoirs on Jiang Qing and Mao Zedong.
