= He Zishu =

Chinese member of the 28 Bolsheviks

He Zishu (Chinese: 何子述) (1901–1932) was a member of the 28 Bolsheviks. He was born in Hubei Province and educated in Wuhan. He was introduced by Dong Biwu to the Chinese Communist Party. In 1927, he went to the Soviet Union to study at Moscow Sun Yat-sen University. In 1930, he was a member of the CCP organization for Northern China. He was betrayed in 1931 and arrested by the Kuomintang in Tianjin in 1931. He was executed by firing squad the next year in 1932.
