= Long March =

1934–1936 Red Army retreat during the Chinese Civil War

- Part of Chinese Civil War
- Overview map Light red areas show Communist enclaves. Areas marked by a blue "X" were overrun by Kuomintang forces during the Fourth Encirclement Campaign, forcing the Fourth (north) and Second (south) Red Armies to retreat westward (dotted lines). The heavy dashed line is the route of the First Red Army from Jiangxi. The withdrawal of all three Red Armies ends in the northeast enclave of Shaanxi.
Date	16 October 1934 – 19 October 1935 (1 year, 3 days) (Note: Dates correspond to First Red Army)
Location	Southern, Southwestern, and Northwestern China
Result	Communists evade Nationalist armies and allied warlords

Belligerents
Nationalist China: National Revolutionary Army; Allied warlords	Chinese Soviet Republic: Chinese Red Army

Commanders and leaders
Chiang Kai-shek; Xue Yue; Bai Chongxi	Mao Zedong; Zhu De; Bo Gu; He Long; Zhang Guotao; Xu Xiangqian; Otto Braun; Xu Haidong

Strength
Over 300,000	First Front Red Army 69,000 (October 1934) 7,000 (October 1935)

Chinese name
- Traditional Chinese: 長征
- Simplified Chinese: 长征
Transcriptions
Standard Mandarin
- Hanyu Pinyin: Chángzhēng
- Wade–Giles: Chʻang^{2}-cheng^{1}
- IPA: [ʈʂʰǎŋʈʂə́ŋ]
Yue: Cantonese
- Yale Romanization: Chèuhng-jīng
- Jyutping: Coeng4-zing1
- IPA: [tsʰœŋ˩.tsɪŋ˥]
Southern Min
- Tâi-lô: Tiông-ting

The Long March (Chinese: 长征; pinyin: Chángzhēng; lit. 'Long Expedition') was a military retreat by the Chinese Communist Party (CCP) and Chinese Red Army from advancing Kuomintang (KMT) National Revolutionary Army during the Chinese Civil War, occurring between October 1934 and October 1935. About 100,000 troops retreated from the Jiangxi Soviet and other bases to a new headquarters in Yan'an, Shaanxi, travelling approximately 10,000 kilometres (6,200 miles). About 8,000 troops ultimately survived the Long March.

After the defeat of the Red Army in Chiang Kai-shek's Fifth Encirclement Campaign, on 10 October 1934 the CCP decided to abandon its Jiangxi Soviet and headquarters in Ruijin, Jiangxi. The First Front Red Army of some 86,000 troops headed west, traveling over the rugged terrain of China's western provinces, including eastern Tibet. The Red Army broke several of Chiang's blockades with heavy losses, and by the time it crossed the Xiang River on 1 December had only 36,000 men left. Its leaders, including Comintern military adviser Otto Braun and Moscow-trained Bo Gu, decided to take the troops through Hunan, but Chiang set up defenses to block their way. Mao Zedong, who was not a member of the Politburo, suggested going through Guizhou instead, which was accepted. On New Year's Day 1935, the Red Army crossed the Wu River, and a week later held the Zunyi Conference, which reduced Soviet influence in the Politburo and established Mao's position as de facto leader.

Employing guerrilla warfare, Mao maneuvered to avoid direct confrontation with Chiang's forces and led the Red Army out of encirclements by local warlords. The First Front Army met the Fourth Front Army, led by Zhang Guotao, in Maogong, Sichuan; they disagreed on the route to take to Yan'an and split up. The First Front Army arrived in Yan'an on 19 October 1935 with about 8,000 survivors, ending the Long March. The Fourth Front Army was largely destroyed by Chiang and Ma clique attacks, and its remnants joined the Second Front Army led by He Long. All three armies met on 22 October 1936.

Mao's leadership during the retreat brought him immense prestige and support among many within the otherwise-shattered Communist Party. It marked the beginning of his long ascent to primacy, and would be featured heavily in his public image, through the founding of the People's Republic.

== Timeline ==
=== 1920s–1934 ===
- 23 July 1921: The Chinese Communist Party is formally founded.
- 1928: The CCP's Red Army is founded, concentrated in Jiangxi and Fujian.
- 7 November 1931: The Jiangxi–Fujian Soviet is founded by Mao Zedong and Zhu De in the capital of Ruijin, as the first member of the Chinese Soviet Republic.
- December 1931: Zhou Enlai arrives in Ruijin, replacing Mao as political commissar of the Red Army.
- October 1932: At the Ningdu Conference, the majority of Red Army leaders criticize Mao's tactics. Mao is demoted to a figurehead status.
- 1933: Bo Gu and Otto Braun arrive from the USSR, reorganize the Red Army, and take control of Party affairs. Four successive encirclement campaigns by the Nationalists are defeated.
- 25 September 1933: The Fifth Encirclement Campaign begins, with Bo and Braun eventually defeated in October 1934.
- 10 October 1934: The First Red Army, consisting of 130,000 soldiers and civilians led by Bo and Braun, begins the Long March, departing from Yudu in Jiangxi.
- 30 November–25 December 1934: The First Army fights the Nationalists at the Battle of Xiang River.

=== 1935 ===
- 15–17 January: The leadership of Bo and Braun is denounced at the Zunyi Conference. Zhou becomes the most powerful person in the Party, with Mao becoming Zhou's assistant.
- March: The Fourth Red Army under Zhang Guotao departs from its base on the Sichuan–Shaanxi border.
- 29 April–9 May: The First Army crosses the Jinsha River, the upper stretches of the Yangtze.
- 22 May: The Red Army forms an alliance with the Yi people.
- 29 May: The First Army captures Luding Bridge.
- June–July: The First and Fourth Armies meet at Maogong. Mao and Zhang disagree on strategy, and the forces ultimately separate.
- July: The Second Army crosses the Jade Dragon Snow Mountains.
- August: The First Army crosses the Zoigê Marsh.
- 16 September: The First Army crosses the Lazikou Pass.
- 19 October: The First Army arrives in Wuqizhen, a small town 145 kilometers away from Yan'an, ending their Long March.
- November: Mao is named the Chairman of the Military Commission.
- 19 November: The Second Red Army under He Long begins its retreat to Yan'an, marching west from the Hunan-Hubei border. On the same day, the Fourth Red Army is defeated by Nationalist forces at Baizhang Pass in Sichuan.

=== 1936 ===
- 9 October: The Fourth Red Army meets up with the First in Huining, Gansu.
- 22 October: The Second Red Army meets up with elements of the First in Jiangtaibao, Gansu. This ends the Long March for all forces.

== Background ==
=== The Red Army in 1934 ===
The divisions of the Red Army (Chinese: 中國工農紅軍; pinyin: Zhōngguó gōngnóng hóngjūn; lit. 'Chinese Workers' and Peasants' Red Army') were named according to historical circumstances, not strictly according to the chronological order of their formation. Indeed, early Communist units would often form by defection from existing Kuomintang forces, and they kept their original designations. By the time of the Long March, numerous small units had been organized into three unified Armies: the First, the Second, and the Fourth. To distinguish them from earlier organizational divisions, some translations opt to refer to these same units as the "Front Red Armies", correspondingly numbered.

The First Red Army under the command of Bo Gu and Otto Braun, also known as Li De, formed from the 1st, 3rd, and 5th Army Corps in southern Jiangxi. When several units formed the Fourth Red Army under Zhang Guotao in the Sichuan–Shaanxi border area, no standard naming system yet existed, in part lending to limited central control by the CCP over separate Communist-controlled enclaves. After these first two forces were organized, the Second Red Army was formed in eastern Guizhou by unifying the 2nd Army Corps under Xiao Ke with the 6th Army Corps under He Long. A Third Red Army was briefly led by He in the area straddling the Hunan–Hubei border, but its defeat in 1932 led to its merger with the 6th Army Corps in October 1934. These three armies would maintain their historical designations until the formation of the Second United Front with the National Revolutionary Army during the Second Sino-Japanese War, which nominally integrated the Communist forces into the NRA, forming the Eighth Route Army and the New Fourth Army.

=== Civil War ===
The Chinese Communist Party was founded in the year 1921 by Chen Duxiu with Soviet support. The CCP initially collaborated with the nationalist Kuomintang, founded by the revolutionary republican Sun Yat-sen. However, after the unexpected death of Sun in March 1925, a power struggle within the KMT led to the shift in the party's authority to General Chiang Kai-shek, whose Northern Expedition forces succeeded in wresting control of large areas of China from local warlords such as Zhang Zuolin and establishing a unified government in Nanjing in April 1927. Unlike other nationalist leaders, like Wang Jingwei, Chiang was opposed to the idea of continued collaboration with the CCP. The initial period of cooperation to unify China and end the unequal treaties broke up in April 1927 when Chiang Kai-shek struck out against the Communists. Unsuccessful urban insurrections (in Nanchang, Wuhan and Guangzhou) and the suppression of the CCP in Shanghai and other cities drove many party supporters to rural strongholds such as the Jiangxi Soviet, which was organized by Mao Zedong. By 1928, deserters and defecting Kuomintang army units, supplemented by peasants from the Communist rural soviets, formed the Chinese Workers' and Peasants' Red Army. The ideological confrontation between the CCP and the KMT soon evolved into the first phase of the Chinese Civil War.

=== The Jiangxi Soviet ===
By 1930, the Red Army had established the Chinese Soviet Republic in the provinces of Jiangxi and Fujian around the city of Ruijin, including industrial facilities.

After the establishment of the Jiangxi Soviet, Mao's status within the Party declined. In 1930, Mao claimed a need to eliminate alleged KMT spies and Anti-Bolsheviks operating inside the Jiangxi Soviet and began an ideological campaign featuring torture and guilt by association, in order to eliminate his enemies. The campaign continued until the end of 1931, killing approximately 70,000 people and reducing the size of the Red Army from 40,000 to less than 10,000. The de facto leader of the party at the time, Zhou Enlai, originally supported Mao's purges as necessary to eliminate KMT spies. After Zhou arrived in Jiangxi in December 1931, he criticized Mao's campaigns for being directed more against anti-Maoists than legitimate threats to the Party, for the campaign's general senselessness, and for the widespread use of torture to extract confessions. During 1932, following Zhou's efforts to end Mao's ideological persecutions, the campaigns gradually subsided.

In December, of 1931 Zhou replaced Mao Zedong as Secretary of the First Front Army and political commissar of the Red Army. Liu Bocheng, Lin Biao and Peng Dehuai all criticized Mao's tactics at the August 1932 Ningdu Conference. The most senior leaders to support Mao in 1932 were Zhou Enlai, who had become disillusioned with the strategic leadership of other senior leaders in the Party, and Mao's old comrade, Zhu De. Zhou's support was not enough, and Mao was demoted to being a figurehead in the Soviet government, until he regained his position later, during the Long March.

=== Chiang's Encirclement Campaigns ===
In early 1933, Bo Gu arrived in Jiangxi with the German Comintern adviser Otto Braun and took control of Party affairs. Zhou at this time, apparently with strong support from Party and military colleagues, reorganized and standardized the Red Army. Under Zhou, Bo, and Braun, the Red Army defeated four attacks by Chiang Kai-shek's Nationalist troops.

Chiang's fifth campaign was much more difficult to contain. In September 1933, the National Revolutionary Army under Chiang Kai-shek eventually completely encircled Jiangxi, with the advice and tactical assistance of his German adviser, Hans von Seeckt. A fortified perimeter was established by Chiang's forces, and Jiangxi was besieged in an attempt to destroy the Communist forces trapped within. In July 1934, the leaders of the Party, dominated by the "Twenty-Eight Bolsheviks", a militant group formed in Moscow by Wang Ming and Bo Gu, forced Mao from the Politburo of the CCP in Ruijin and placed him briefly under house arrest. Mao was replaced by Zhou Enlai as leader of the military commission.

Chiang's strategy of slowly constructing a series of interlinking blockhouses (resembling medieval castles) was successful, and Chiang's army was able to capture several major Communist strongholds within months. Between January and March 1934, the Nationalists advanced slowly. Bo and Braun continued to employ orthodox military tactics, resulting in a series of Kuomintang advances and heavy Communist casualties. In October 1934 KMT troops won a decisive battle and drove deep into the heart of the Central Soviet Area. When Ruijin became exposed to KMT attack, Party leaders faced the choice of either remaining and perishing or of abandoning the base area and attempting to break through the enemy encirclement.

In August 1934, with the Red Army depleted by the prolonged conflict, a spy, Mo Xiong, who had been placed by Zhou Enlai in the KMT army headquarters in Nanchang, brought news that Chiang Kai-shek was preparing a major offensive against the Communist capital, Ruijin. The Communist leadership decided on a strategic retreat to regroup with other Communist units, and to avoid annihilation. The original plan was to link up with the Second Red Army commanded by He Long, thought to be in Hubei to the west and north. Communications between divided groups of the Red Army had been disrupted by the Kuomintang campaign. During the planning to evacuate Jiangxi, the First Red Army was unaware that these other Communist forces were also retreating westward.

== The Long March ==
=== Escape from Jiangxi ===
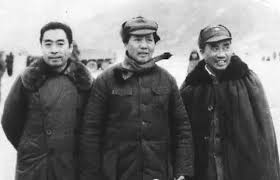
Zhou Enlai, Mao Zedong, and Zhu De during the Long March.

Since the Central Base Area could not be held, the Standing Committee appointed Bo (responsible for politics), Braun (responsible for military strategy), and Zhou (responsible for the implementation of military planning) to organize the evacuation. Since the enemy was close, Zhou, in charge of logistics, made his plans in complete secrecy. It was not disclosed who was to leave or when: even senior leaders were only at the last moments told of the Army's movements. It is not known what criteria were used to determine who would stay and who would go, but 16,000 troops and some of the Communists' most notable commanders at the time (including Xiang Ying, Chen Yi, Tan Zhenlin, and Qu Qiubai) were left to form a rear guard, to divert the main force of Nationalist troops from noticing, and preventing, the general withdrawal.

The first movements to screen the retreat were undertaken by forces led by Fang Zhimin, breaking through Kuomintang lines in June 1934. Although Fang Zhimin's troops were soon destroyed, these movements surprised the Kuomintang, who were numerically superior to the Communists at the time and did not expect an attack on their fortified perimeter.

The early troop movements were actually a diversion to allow the retreat of more important leaders from Jiangxi. On October 16, 1934, a force of about 130,000 soldiers and civilians under Bo Gu and Otto Braun attacked the line of Kuomintang positions near Yudu. More than 86,000 troops, 11,000 administrative personnel and thousands of civilian porters actually completed the breakout; the remainder, largely wounded or ill soldiers, continued to fight a delaying action after the main force had left, and then dispersed into the countryside. From October 18 to 21, Mao along with more than 40,000 troops crossed the Gan River in an armada of small boats. Several prominent members of the Chinese Soviet who remained behind were captured and executed by the Kuomintang after the fall of Ruijin in November 1934, including Qu Qiubai and the youngest brother of Mao Zedong, Mao Zetan.

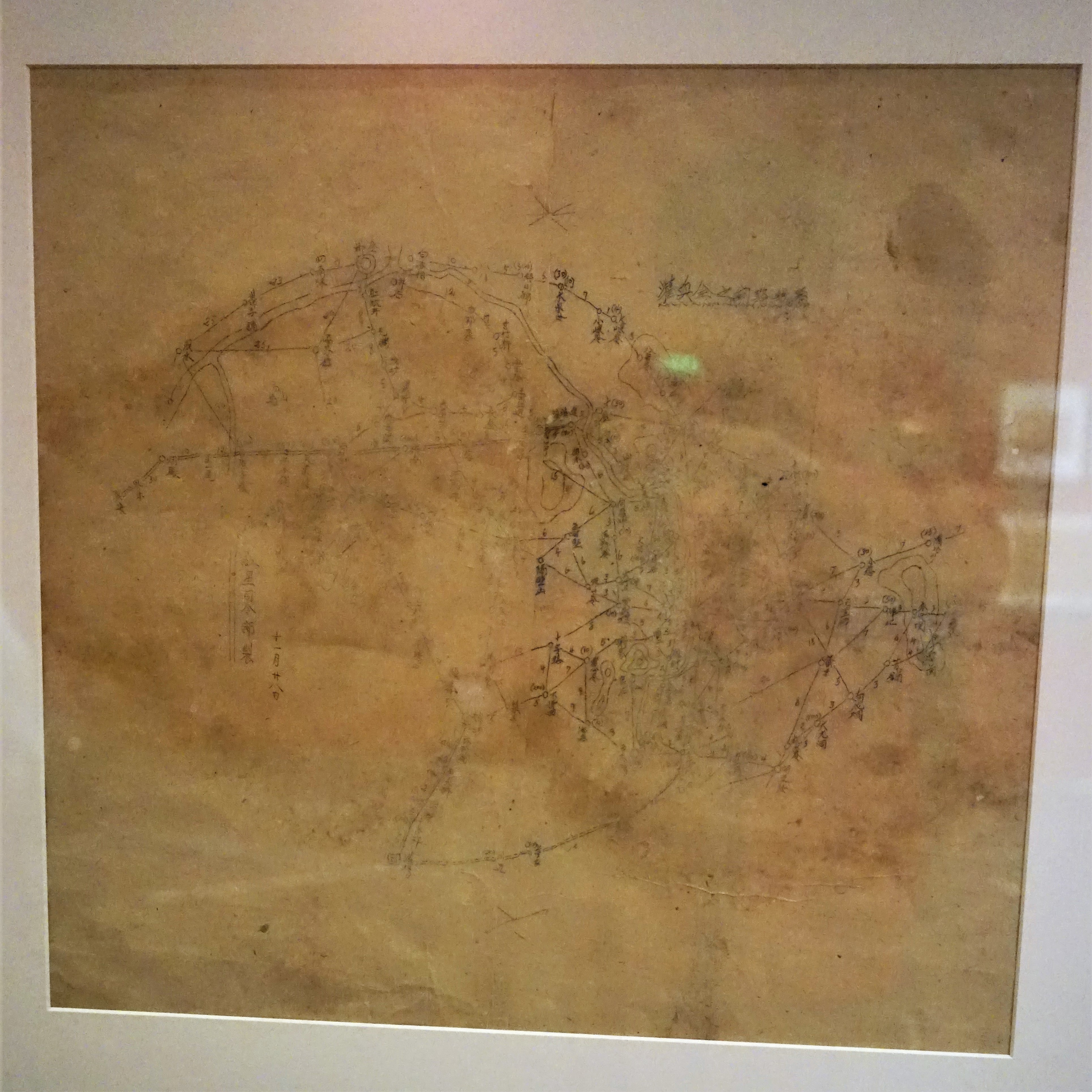
Map drawn by the Red Army Command before the Battle of Xiangjiang

The withdrawal began in early October 1934. Zhou's intelligence agents were successful in identifying a large section of Chiang's blockhouse lines that were manned by troops under General Chen Jitang, a Guangdong warlord who Zhou identified as being likely to prefer preserving the strength of his troops over fighting. Zhou sent Pan Hannian to negotiate for safe passage with General Chen, who subsequently allowed the Red Army to pass through the territory that he controlled without fighting. The Red army successfully crossed the Xinfeng River and marched through the province of Guangdong and into Hunan before encountering the last of Chiang's fortifications at the Xiang River.

After passing through three of the four blockhouse fortifications needed to escape Chiang's encirclement, the Red Army was finally intercepted by regular Nationalist troops, and suffered heavy casualties. Of the 86,000 Communists who attempted to break out of Jiangxi with the First Red Army, only 36,000 successfully escaped. Due to the low morale within the Red Army at the time, it is not possible to know what proportion of these losses were due to military casualties, and which proportion were due to desertion. The conditions of the Red Army's forced withdrawal demoralized some Communist leaders (particularly Bo Gu and Otto Braun), but Zhou remained calm and retained his command. Most Communist losses occurred over only two days of heavy fighting, from November 30 to December 1, 1934.

=== Determining the direction of the Red Army ===
After escaping Chiang's encirclement, it was obvious to Party leaders that Chiang was intent on intercepting what remained of the Red Army in Hunan, and the direction of the Red Army's movements had to be reconsidered. The plan to rendezvous and join He Long's army in Hunan had become too risky. Mao suggested to Zhou that the Red Army change direction, towards Guizhou, where Mao expected enemy defenses to be weak.

A meeting at Tongdao, close to the border of Hunan and Guizhou, was convened to discuss the direction of the Red Army on December 12, 1934. Zhou endorsed Mao's proposal, encouraging other leaders to overrule the objections of Bo and Braun. Another dispute of the direction of the Red Army occurred soon after, once the Red Army reached Liping, in the mountains of southeast Guizhou. Braun believed that they should travel to eastern Guizhou, but Mao wanted to go to western Guizhou, where he expected KMT forces to be lighter and which borders Sichuan, and to establish a base area there. In a meeting to decide the army's direction, Zhou sided with Mao, making Braun "fly into a rage because he was overruled in the debate." At the meeting it was decided that the Red Army would travel towards Zunyi, in western Guizhou.

On January 1, 1935, the Red Army reached the Wu River. Bo and Braun again insisted the Red Army move back to western Hunan to join other Communist troops in the area, but their prestige had considerably declined by that point, and their suggestion was rejected. Even Zhou had become impatient, and proposed a new rule which was put into effect immediately: that all military plans had to be submitted to the Politburo for approval. The movement passed, clearly depriving Braun of the right to direct military affairs. On January 15 the Red Army captured Zunyi, the second largest city in Guizhou. As Mao had predicted, the city was weakly defended, and was too far from Nationalist forces to be under immediate threat of attack. By the time the Red Army occupied Zunyi, it was highly depleted, and counted little more than 10,000 men. Zhou used the peace afforded in Zunyi to call an enlarged Politburo meeting, in order to examine the causes of the Communists' repeated defeats.

=== The Zunyi Conference ===
The Communists' Zunyi Conference lasted from January 15–17, 1935, and resulted in a reshuffling of the Party politburo. Zhou intended the conference to draw lessons from the Red Army's past failures, and to develop strategies for the future. Much of the discussion revolved around whether the defeats of the Red Army were due to unavoidable circumstances, or inadequacies of leadership. Bo Gu, the first speaker, attributed the Red Army's losses to "objective" causes, particularly the enemy's overwhelming numerical superiority, and poor coordination of Communist forces. Braun's interpreter, Wu Xiuquan, later recalled that Bo's arguments did not impress his audience, and that Bo came across as someone attempting to avoid responsibility.

Zhou Enlai was the next to speak. Zhou blamed the Red Army's failures on poor decisions at the leadership level, and blamed himself as one of the three people most responsible. Zhou's willingness to accept responsibility was well received. Zhang Wentian, basing many of his conclusions on recent discussions with Mao, attacked Bo and Braun directly, criticizing them for numerous strategic and tactical errors.

After Zhang, Mao gave a speech in which he analyzed the poor tactics and strategies of the two leaders. With Zhou's explicit backing, Mao won over the meeting. Seventeen of the meeting's twenty participants (the exceptions being Bo, Braun, and He Kequan) argued in his favor.

Of the three leaders who had controlled the Party before the Zunyi Conference, only Zhou Enlai's political career survived. Zhou was held partially responsible for the Red Army's defeat, but was retained at the top level of Party leadership because of his differences with Bo and Braun at Ningdu, his successful tactics in defeating Chiang's fourth Encirclement Campaign, and his resolute support of Mao. Although the failed leadership of Bo Gu and Otto Braun was denounced, Mao was not able to win the support of a sufficient number of Party leaders to gain outright power at the conference.

A major shift in the Party's leadership occurred two months later, in March 1935. Mao was passed over for the position of General Secretary by Zhang Wentian, but gained enough influence to be elected one of three members of Military Affairs Commission. The other two members were Zhou Enlai, who retained his position as Director of the commission, and Wang Jiaxiang, whose support Mao had enlisted earlier. Within this group, Zhou was empowered to make the final decisions on military matters, while Mao was Zhou's assistant. Wang was in charge of Party affairs.

=== Escaping Chiang's pursuit ===
When the army resumed its march northward, the direct route to Sichuan was blocked by Chiang's forces. Mao's forces spent the next several months maneuvering to avoid direct confrontation with hostile forces, but still attempting to move north to join Zhang Guotao's Fourth Red Army. While Chiang's armies approached Mao in northern Guizhou from three directions, Mao maneuvered out of the encirclement by crossing the Chishui River four times. Then, Mao led the Red Army, crossing the Wu River and marching towards Guiyang. He feigned an attack to this city when Chiang was visiting. Chiang ordered his army in Kunming to move eastward to save Guiyang, but the Red Army turned towards Kunming immediately and entered Yunnan, where the Yangtze River was lightly guarded.

In February 1935, Mao's wife, He Zizhen, gave birth to a daughter. Because of the harsh conditions, the infant was left with a local family. (Note: Two Europeans retracing the Long March route in 2003 met a woman in rural Yunnan province said by local officials to be Mao and He Zizhen's long-lost daughter.)

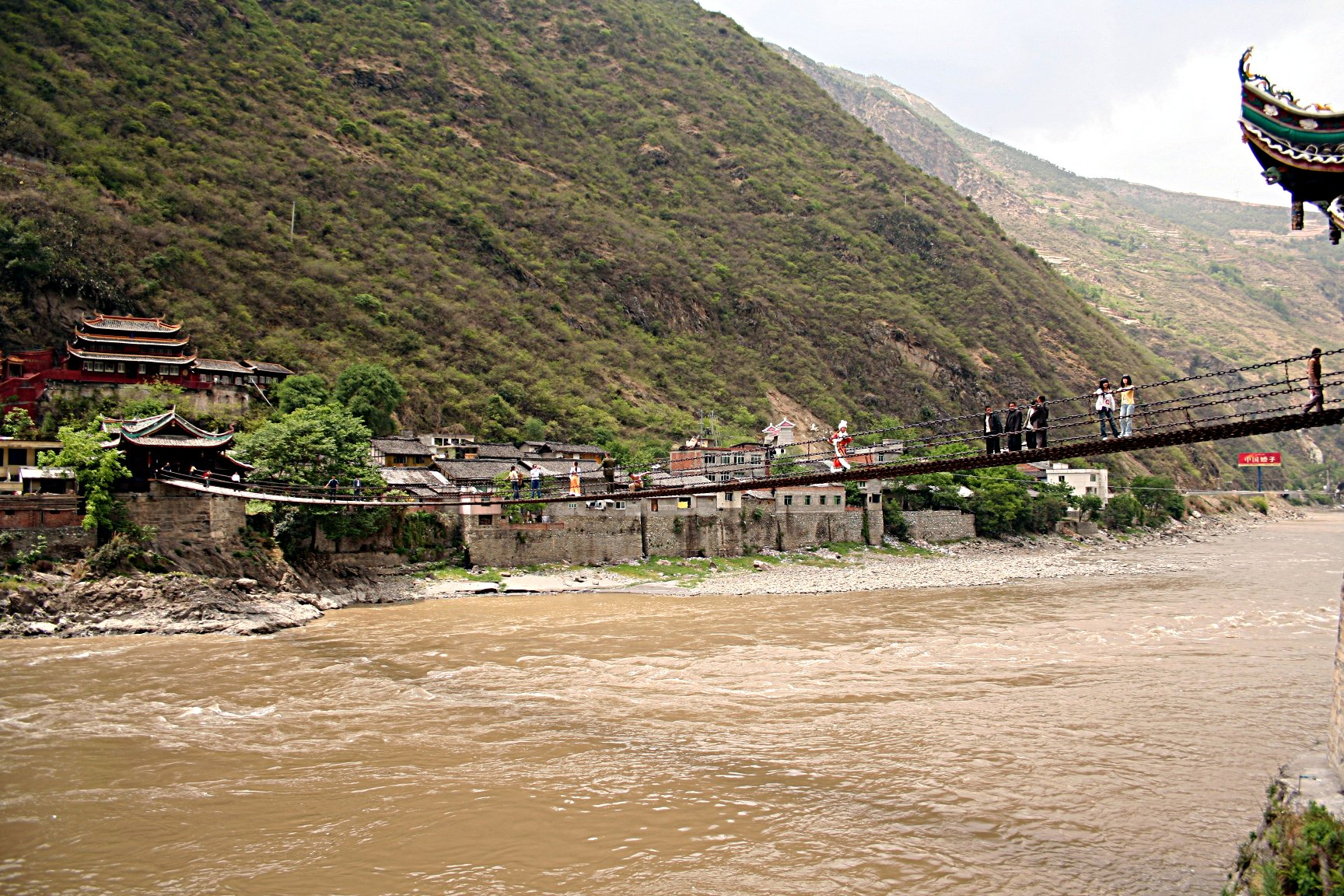
The Luding Bridge

The Communist forces were harassed by both the Kuomintang and local warlords. To avoid a fatal confrontation, Zhou and Mao maneuvered the Red army south and west, through Guizhou, Sichuan, and Yunnan, feigning attacks on Guiyang and Kunming to disguise their movements. The First Red Army crossed the Yangtze (the section of Jinsha River) on May 9, 1935, finally escaping determined pursuit, but still had to deal with dangerous mountain passes at heights of up to 4,000 meters, rough climatic conditions, shortages of food, clothing, and equipment, and tribes of local ethnic groups hostile to Chinese encroachment. The Red Army had to capture river crossings defended by warlords and Nationalist troops. The most famous was Luding Bridge, extolled in official history as an heroic triumph, although many historians now believe that the difficulty of the battle was exaggerated or that the incident was fabricated for propaganda purposes.

=== Conflict with ethnic warlords ===
Warlords often refused to help out the Kuomintang against the Communist Red Army, preferring to save their own forces.

300 "Khampa bandits" were enlisted into the Kuomintang's Consolatory Commission military in Sichuan, where they were part of the effort of the central government of China to penetrate and destabilize the local Han warlords such as Liu Wenhui. The Chinese government sought to exercise full control over frontier areas against the warlords. Liu had refused to do battle with the Red Army, to save his own military from destruction. The Consolatory Commission forces were used to battle the Communist Red Army, but were defeated when their religious leader was captured by Communist forces.

Communist forces on the Long March clashed against Kham rebels in the 1934 Khamba Rebellion, who were fleeing from Tibetan government forces.

=== The Fourth Red Army ===
In June–July 1935, the troops under Mao united with the Fourth Red Army, led by Zhang Guotao, which had retreated west from Henan. Zhang had taken a different route of evacuation, and arrived at Lianghekou with 84,000 troops in relatively good condition. The fact that he had control of superior forces gave him the power to challenge the authority of Zhou and Mao, whose power was based largely on the Party's support. Zhang demanded that one of his own generals, Chen Changhao, take over Zhou's position as political commissar of the entire Red Army, and suggested that Zhang himself replace Zhu De on the Military Commission. Zhang argued that such a reorganization would create a more "equal" army organization. On July 18, Zhou relinquished his position as political commissar, and several leading positions were taken over by generals of the Fourth Red Army.

These changes had no long-term significance because Zhang and Mao disagreed with the direction of the army. Zhang insisted on going southwest, while Mao insisted on going northwards, towards Shaanxi. No agreement was reached, and the two armies eventually split, each going their separate ways.

Zhang Guotao's Fourth Red Army took a different route than Mao, travelling south, then west, and finally north through China. On the way Zhang's forces were largely destroyed by the forces of Chiang Kai-shek and his Chinese Muslim allies, the Ma clique. The remnants of Zhang's forces later rejoined elements of the Second Red Army before eventually linking up with Mao's forces in Shaanxi.

=== The Second Red Army ===
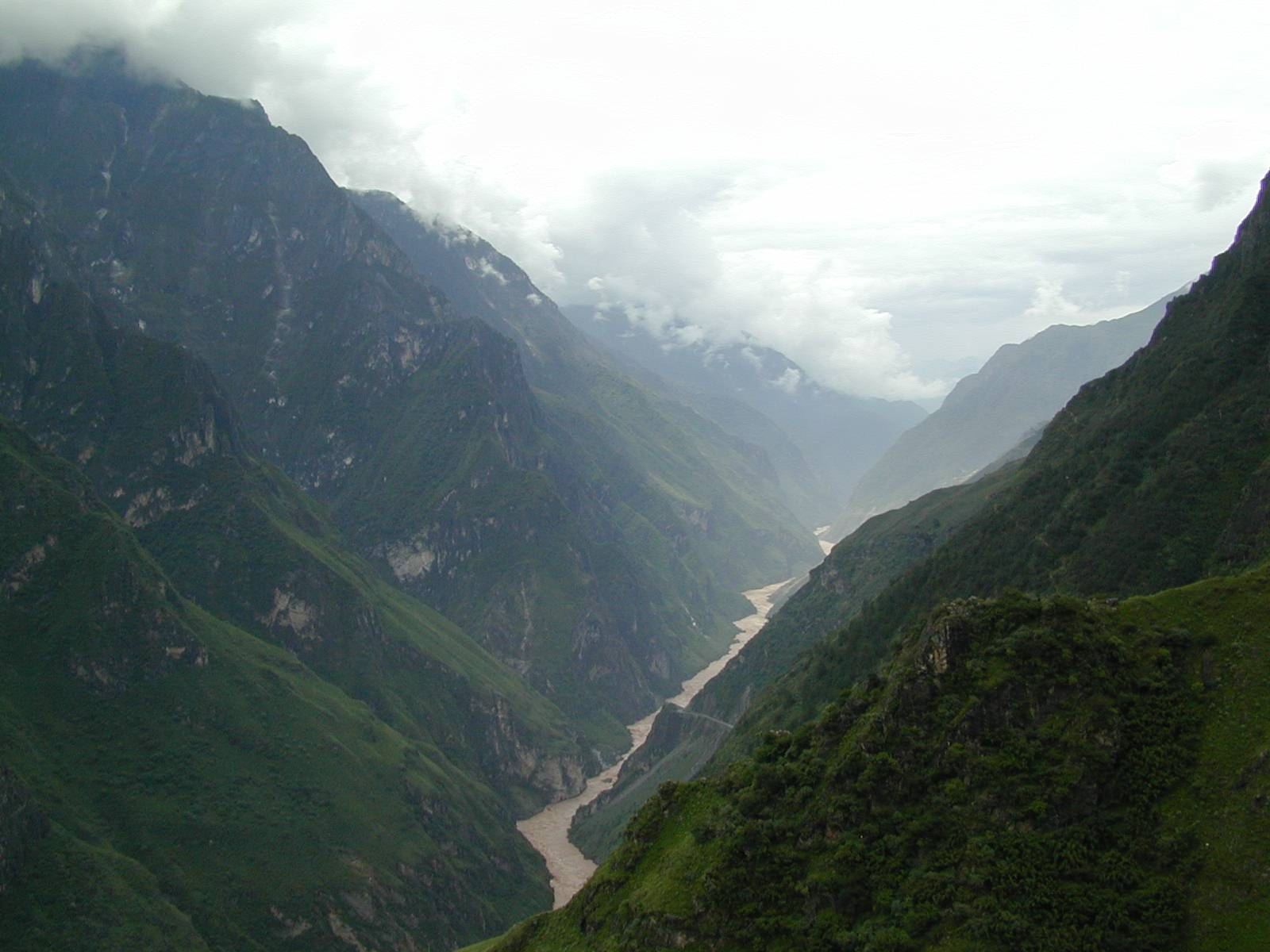
Tiger Leaping Gorge in the Jade Dragon Snow Mountain massif of western Yunnan province

The Second Red Army began its own withdrawal west from Hubei in November 1935, led by He Long, who commanded the KMT Twentieth Army in 1923 before joining the CCP. In 1932 he established a soviet in the Hunan-Jiangxi border area, and in August 1934 received command of the Second Red Army, establishing a base in Hubei. An advance party of the First Red Army, called the Sixth Corps, commanded by Xiao Ke, was sent towards the Second Red Army two months before the beginning of the Long March. Xiao Ke's force would link up with He Long and his army, but lost communication with the First Army that came behind. It was at this point that Li Zhen's unit was assigned to He Long's command, having already served in the Sixth Corps.

On November 19, 1935, the Second Red Army set out on its own Long March. He Long's force was driven further west than the First Red Army, all the way to Lijiang in Yunnan province, then across the Jade Dragon Snow Mountain massif and through the Tibetan highlands of western Sichuan. He Long and Xiao Ke were married to sisters who also accompanied the army. He Long's wife, Jian Xianren, carried the baby daughter she had given birth to three weeks before the retreat began. Jian Xianfo gave birth to a son in the desolate swamps of northern Sichuan. Forces of the Second Army detained two European missionaries, Rudolf Bosshardt and Arnolis Hayman, for 16 months. Bosshardt later related his account of the details of daily life on the Long March in a book.

=== Union of the three armies ===
Mao's First Red Army traversed several swamps and was attacked by Muslim Hui Ma clique forces under Generals Ma Bufang and Ma Buqing. Finally, in October 1935, Mao's army reached Shaanxi province and joined with local Communist forces there, led by Liu Zhidan, Gao Gang, and Xu Haidong, who had already established a Soviet base in northern Shaanxi. The remnants of Zhang's Fourth Red Army eventually rejoined Mao in Shaanxi, but with his army destroyed, Zhang, even as a founding member of the CCP, was never able to challenge Mao's authority. After an expedition of almost a year, the Second Red Army reached Bao'an (Shaanxi) on October 22, 1936, known in China as the "union of the three armies", and the end of the Long March.

All along the way, the Communist Army confiscated property and weapons from local warlords and landlords, while recruiting peasants and the poor. Nevertheless, only some 8,000 troops under Mao's command, the First Front Army, ultimately made it to the final destination of Yan'an in 1935. Of these, less than 7,000 were among the original 100,000 soldiers who had started the march. A variety of factors contributed to the losses including fatigue, hunger and cold, sickness, desertion, and military casualties. During the retreat, membership in the party fell from 300,000 to around 40,000.

In November 1935, shortly after settling in northern Shaanxi, Mao officially took over Zhou Enlai's leading position in the Red Army. Following a major reshuffling of official roles, Mao became the chairman of the Military Commission, with Zhou and Deng Xiaoping as vice-chairmen. (After Zhang Gutao reached Shaanxi, Deng was replaced by Zhang). This marked Mao's position as the pre-eminent leader of the Party, with Zhou in a position second to Mao. Both Mao and Zhou retained their positions until their deaths in 1976.

=== Aftermath ===
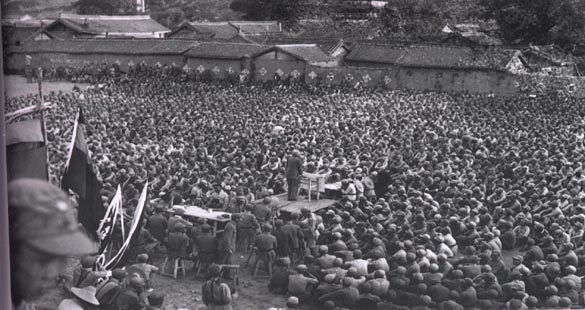
A Communist leader addressing Long March survivors

While costly, the Long March gave the CCP the isolation it needed, allowing its army to recuperate and rebuild in the north. It also was vital in helping the CCP to gain a positive reputation among the peasants due to the determination and dedication of the surviving participants of the Long March. Mao wrote in 1935:

The Long March is a manifesto. It has proclaimed to the world that the Red Army is an army of heroes, while the imperialists and their running dogs, Chiang Kai-shek and his like, are impotent. It has proclaimed their utter failure to encircle, pursue, obstruct and intercept us. The Long March is also a propaganda force. It has announced to some 200 million people in eleven provinces that the road of the Red Army is their only road to liberation.

In addition, policies ordered by Mao for all soldiers to follow, the Eight Points of Attention, instructed the army to treat peasants respectfully and pay fairly for, rather than confiscate, any goods, in spite of the desperate need for food and supplies. This policy won support for the Communists among the rural peasants.

Hostilities ceased while the Nationalists and Chinese Communists formed a nominal alliance during the Second Sino-Japanese War from 1937 until 1945. During these years, the CCP persevered and strengthened its influence. The Red Army fought a disciplined and organized guerilla campaign against superior Japanese forces, allowing it to gain experience. Following the end of World War II, the resurgent Communist Eighth Route Army, later called the People's Liberation Army, returned to drive the Kuomintang out of Mainland China to the island of Taiwan. Since the establishment of the People's Republic of China in 1949, the Long March has been glorified as an example of the CCP's strength and resilience.

The Long March solidified Mao's status as the undisputed leader of the CCP, though he did not officially become party chairman until 1943. Other survivors of the March also went on to become prominent party leaders well into the 1990s, including Zhu De, Lin Biao, Liu Shaoqi, Dong Biwu, Ye Jianying, Li Xiannian, Yang Shangkun, Zhou Enlai and Deng Xiaoping.

At the age of 9, Xiang Xuan, the nephew of He Long, was the youngest participant of the Long March. Wu Zhong, one of the participants in the Long March, became the youngest general in the People's Liberation Army.

One of the last known survivors of the Long March, Tu Tongjin, a native of Changting, Fujian, died at the age of 108 on 3 April 2023. Wang Quanying, the last surviving female participant of the Long March, died at the age of 105 on 22 July 2026.

=== Length ===
In 2003, controversy arose about the distance covered by Mao's First Front Army in the Long March. The figure of 25,000 li (12,500 kilometres or about 8,000 miles) was Mao's estimate, quoted by his biographer Edgar Snow in Red Star Over China, published not long after the end of the Long March in 1938. But in a poem written by Mao in October 1935 at the end of the Long March, Mount Liupan, Mao states their distance as 20,000 li (10,000 kilometres or about 6,200 miles). In 2003, two British researchers, Ed Jocelyn and Andrew McEwen, retraced the route in 384 days, and in their 2006 book "The Long March" estimated the March actually covered about 6,000 km (3,700 miles or 11,154 li). Chinese media, Beijing Daily disputed their report: "The 25,000 li of the Red Army's Long March are a historic fact." Beijing Daily proved that even the First Red Army, which had the least walking distance, travelled closer to 18,088 li (9,375 km or 6,000 miles), and the two British young men did not follow the route in those years. In 2005, Xiaoai Zhang, the daughter of Aiping Zhang and David Ben Uziel, Israeli soldier and photographer, took a similar route of the Red Force which lasted 138 days, of which more than 1,200 kilometers were walking, 24,000 kilometers traveled by car.

== The March in popular culture ==
The Chinese government produced a movie in 2006, My Long March, relating personal experiences of a fictional participant in the Long March. The movie, released in celebration of the 71st year since the end of the march, was the second of three movies in the Axis of War movie series, retelling the events stretching from the Battle of the Xiang River up to the Battle of Luding Bridge.

== Legacy ==
=== Use as namesake ===
- Vietnamese communist political leader and revolutionary Trường Chinh (1907 – 1988). Trường Chinh was born Đặng Xuân Khu, but changed his name to Trường Chinh (meaning Long March) in honor of the Long March.
- The Chinese Long March rocket family, a series of expendable launch system operated by the China National Space Administration (CNSA), are named after the Long March.
- A number of Chinese nuclear submarines, starting from Type 091 class, have been named after the Long March.
- The Farakka Long March, an Anti-Indian demonstration in May 1976 in Rajshahi, Bangladesh, led by the Maoist politician Maulana Abdul Hamid Khan Bhashani in protest of the construction of Farakka Dam by India, took its name from the Long March.
- The long march through the institutions, the political strategy of revolution by becoming part of government.

== See also ==
- History of China
- History of the Republic of China
- History of the People's Republic of China
- Outline of the Chinese Civil War
- National Revolutionary Army
- People's Liberation Army
- Warlord Era
- Whampoa Military Academy
