= Chen Yuandao =

Chinese politician (1902–1933)

Chen Yuandao (Chinese: 陈原道) (1902 – April 10, 1933), also called Yuandao (Chinese: 元道), was a member of the 28 Bolsheviks. He was born in Anhui Province. He was introduced by Yun Daiying into the Chinese Communist Party. He participated in the May Thirtieth Movement. After returning from his studies at Moscow Sun Yat-sen University in the Soviet Union, he was tasked with party activities in Jiangsu Province in 1929. In 1930, he went to Henan Province to organize party activities. In 1931, he was imprisoned in Beiping while organizing in Hebei Province, but rescued by fellow communists in 1932. But later on he was betrayed and reimprisoned in Nanjing before being executed by the Kuomintang, leaving behind his pregnant wife.

He had a son Liu Jiyuan who was born on August 1933 after he was executed.
