= Meng Qingshu =

Chinese politician (1911–1983)

- 孟庆树
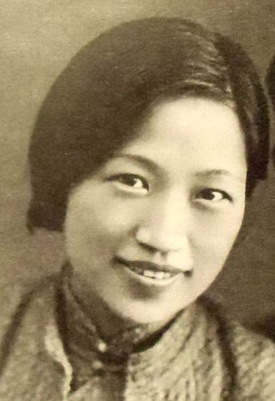
- Meng in 1938
- Born: 2 December 1911; Shouxian, Qing Empire
- Died: 5 September 1983 (aged 71); Moscow, Soviet Union
- Resting place: Novodevichy Cemetery
- Other name: Роза Владимировна Осетрова
- Education: Sun Yat-Sen University
- Spouse: Wang Ming (m. 1930; died 1974)

Meng Qingshu (Chinese: 孟庆树, romanized: Mèng Qìngshù, Russian: Мэн Циншу, 2 December 1911 – 5 September 1983), also known as Roza Vladimirovna Osetrova (Chinese: 罗扎·弗拉基米罗夫娜·奥谢特罗娃, Russian: Роза Владимировна Осетрова) was a Chinese politician, member of the 28 Bolsheviks and wife of the Chinese Communist Party active leader, Wang Ming.

== Early life and education ==
Meng was born on 2 December 1911 in Shou County, Qing empire to a landlord family. While attending middle school, she joined the Communist Youth League. In 1926, she graduated high school and entered the Whampoa military academy as one of the first modern Chinese female soldiers. However, she was forced to graduate early due to the Northern Expedition, so she started working as a nurse.

== Sun Yat-Sen University ==
In 1927, at 16 years of age and after working as a nurse for a year, she was chosen by the Central party committee to attend the Sun Yat-Sen university in Moscow under the alias Roza Vladimirovna Osetrova, where she became a member of the 28 Bolsheviks. There, she met Wang Ming; he pursued her romantically, but she was not interested. In 1928, she was chosen by Wang to serve as a representative in the Sixth National Congress, which was held in Moscow, causing Meng to become fond of Wang.

== Return to China ==
In 1930, Meng returned to China, moving to Shanghai and reuniting with Wang, who had moved to Shanghai in 1929. When she returned, she started working at the Shanghai Hudong District Women's Committee. During this period, Wang continued pursuing Meng romantically, with Meng starting to alienate him, consistently rejecting his advances. This culminated in Meng changing her address and moving in with Zhu Xiuying.

On 9 July 1930, Meng was arrested and imprisoned in the Shanghai Longhua Detention Center by the Kuomintang. Due to this, Wang decided to be voluntarily arrested three times in order to be able to visit Meng. The day after being released from prison, on 23 November 1930, she married Wang at 19 years old. In 1931, Meng and Wang secretly moved to Moscow. In 1937, they returned to China to participate in the Second Sino-Japanese War, with Meng taking multiple positions within the Communist party, notably the director of the Care Committee of the Education Association, director of the Women's Committee of the Democratic Movement Department of the Yangtze River Bureau, and several roles relating to women.

== Return to the Soviet Union and death ==
In 1950, Wang became severely ill, causing Meng and Wang to return to Moscow for medical treatment, returning in 1953. In 1956, Wang fell ill again, and Meng again accompanied him to Moscow on January 30, this time moving there permanently. During the flight to Moscow, Wang suffered heart failure, and the doctor who was accompanying them, carrying six syringes of medicine, did not have any of them at hand. This meant that Wang had to receive emergency medical treatment from Meng via a spare syringe with medicine that she was carrying. Wang died due to his illness in Moscow in 1974. After his death, Meng edited and published many of Wang's poems, and also compiled his memoirs. Meng died on 5 September 1983 due to illness. She was buried next to Wang at the Novodevichy cemetery in Moscow.
