= 28 Bolsheviks =

Group of Chinese students who studied in Moscow

The 28 (and a half) Bolsheviks (simplified Chinese: 二十八个半布尔什维克; traditional Chinese: 二十八個半布爾什維克; Russian: Группа 28 большевиков) were a faction in the early Chinese Communist Party (CCP). The faction was formed among Chinese Communists studying at the Sun Yat-sen University in Moscow during the late 1920s and early 1930s. They received their nickname because of their strong support for the orthodox political positions advocated by Joseph Stalin and Pavel Mif. The leaders of the faction included Wang Ming, Bo Gu, Luo Fu, He Zishu, Wang Jiaxiang, and Shen Zemin. Sun Yat-sen University closed in 1930 and the students made their way back to China.

In January 1931, several members of the 28 Bolsheviks were elevated to the Central Committee of the CCP at its Fourth Plenary session. Later that same year, Bo Gu began a four-year term as General Secretary of the Chinese Communist Party. Bo ended Li Lisan's aggressive policy of assaulting the cities and attempted to bring the far-flung Chinese soviets under stricter central control. This latter policy brought several of the 28 Bolsheviks into conflict with Mao Zedong, especially once the CCP's central leadership was forced to flee to Mao's Jiangxi Soviet in late 1931. Mao eventually won over the majority of the party and removed the 28 Bolsheviks from power at the Zunyi Conference in January 1935.

== Background ==
The Soviet Union devoted a significant amount of resources to encouraging revolution in China. It maintained a network of universities to train Chinese revolutionaries, the most important of which was the Sun Yat-sen University in Moscow. Sun Yat-sen University was founded in 1925 as part of the First United Front agreement that the Soviets had brokered between the CCP and the KMT. The university had an important influence on modern Chinese history by educating many prominent Chinese political figures. From the beginning, the university was riven by factional struggles between supporters of Leon Trotsky and Joseph Stalin, which eventually led to the university's closure in 1930.

== Members ==
Although several allusions to the "28 Bolsheviks" can be found in Mao's speeches and a few early works about CCP, a full list of the 28 did not appear until decades later. There are several rival lists of the 28. All agree on twenty-three of the members, while thirteen names appear on some but not all lists. The twenty-three agreed-upon members were Bo Gu, Wang Ming and his wife Meng Qingshu, Chen Changhao and his wife Du Zuoxiang (杜作祥), Shen Zemin and his wife Zhang Qinqiu, Wang Shengrong, Wang Shengdi, Zhang Wentian, Zhu Zishun (朱自舜, female), Zhu Agen, Sun Jimin, Wang Jiaxiang, Yang Shangkun, Xia Xi, He Zishu, Sheng Zhongliang, Wang Yuncheng, Chen Yuandao, Li Zhusheng, Yin Jian, Yuan Jiayong.

The thirteen who are included on some but not all lists are Kai Feng, Chen Weimin, Du Ting, Guo Miaogen, Li Yuanjie (李元杰), Wang Baoli (王宝礼), Song Panmin, Xiao Tefu (肖特甫), Xu Yixin, Yun Yurong, Wang Xiu, Shen Zhiyuan, and Liu Qunxian (female).

== Rise and fall ==
The Sun Yat-sen University closed in 1930. Although the members of the faction were thereafter scattered and never reunited as a group of twenty-eight, upon their return to China a significant minority would play a major role in the politics of the CCP. Those who reached Shanghai in 1930 joined the rising tide of criticism against Li Lisan, who at that time dominated party leadership. Li had been advocating immediate attacks on major cities, a policy that failed with disastrous consequences for the soviet bases. However, contrary to what many early western sources assumed, the 28 Bolsheviks did not play a significant role in ousting Li Lisan. Li was removed largely through the intervention of the Comintern, which sent Central Committee members Zhou Enlai and Qu Qiubai back from Moscow to moderate Li. When this plan failed, the Comintern summoned Li to Moscow in October 1930.

In January 1931 the Central Committee of CCP held its 4th Plenary Meeting, and with the presence and direct support of Pavel Mif, Wang Ming and his group won a landslide victory. Wang was elected to the Communist Party's politburo, while Bo Gu and Zhang Wentian took up other equally important positions.

As a result, the conflict between the Central Committee and Mao Zedong's fledgling Chinese Soviet Republic began once again. Although Wang Ming returned to Moscow after a short stay in Shanghai, Bo Gu and Zhang Wentian both took the position of General Secretary of Central Committee of the Party in turn, and led the Chinese Communist Revolution in a radical/pro-left manner.

Following Chiang Kai-shek's Shanghai massacre of 1927, the CCP went deep underground in Shanghai and other cities. By the early 1930s, even that was unsafe and leaders began to converge at Mao Zedong's Jiangxi Soviet. Among the first to arrive, and to begin dismantling Mao's power, was Zhou Enlai. In 1933, when Bo Gu arrived, the job was mostly finished.

After a series of successful defenses against Nationalist Army attacks, Chiang's German advisers switched tactics and began building concentric circles of fortified positions closer and closer to the communist base. This forced the party to embark in the famous Long March of October 1934 to October 1935. Shortly after the march began, party leaders held an enlarged congress to determine the direction and leadership of the revolution. At the Zunyi Conference in 1935, the 28 Bolsheviks were defeated by Mao Zedong and his allies, primarily due to the backing of Zhou Enlai, and Zhu De and defecting of Zhou Wentian and Wang Jiaxiang.

Bo Gu supported the Comintern military advisor Otto Braun, while Zhang and Wang Jiaxiang, General Commissar of the Red Army, and Yang Shangkun, Commissar of the Third Field Army of Red Army at that time, defected to Mao. This led to the disintegration of the 28 Bolsheviks. Wang Ming was exiled to Moscow where he later died. Zhang was demoted to the field of ideological research in Yan'an, and later appointed Deputy Foreign Minister after 1949. He died during the Cultural Revolution after joining Peng Dehuai in criticizing Mao's policies (for which he was labelled a member of the "Peng Dehuai anti-party group"). Bo Gu died in an air crash in the 1946 when he returned to Yan'an from Chongqing, temporary capital of Kuomintang Government.

== Later history ==
- Wang Jiaxiang was eventually made Director of the CCP Central International Liaison Department after having also served for some time as the PRC's Ambassador to the Soviet Union. He died in the Cultural Revolution.
- Chen Changhao worked with Zhang Guotao when he returned from Moscow and became Zhang's Commissar, but lost power and influence in the struggle between Zhang and Mao. Chen Changhao went on to become a Communist Party historian, and committed suicide in the Cultural Revolution.
- He Kequan was General Secretary of the Chinese Communist Youth League, and later deputy director of the CCP Central Propaganda Department, and died in 1954.
- Xia Xi was sent to Hunan and carried out the purges which took the lives of more than forty thousand Red Army soldiers. He was later regarded as a public enemy. Perhaps because of this, no one came to his aid when he fell into a river and drowned during the Long March.
- Yang Shangkun survived the purges, including the Cultural Revolution. He later became the President of the PRC in the 1980s.
- Shen Zemin, the younger brother of writer Mao Dun, worked for Zhang Guotao and the 4th Red Army. After Zhang's army was defeated, Shen remained at the Communist base in Anhui and died of tuberculosis in 1933.
- Zhang Qinqiu, Shen Zemin's wife, married Chen Changhao after Shen's death. She is often considered the only "woman general" of the Red Army (which never formally awarded military ranks). After 1949, she was appointed Deputy Minister of Textile Industry, but committed suicide in the Cultural Revolution.
- Yin Jian was arrested by Kuomintang when he mobilized workers in Northern China, and was subsequently executed.
- Li Zhusheng was promoted to the Politburo after Wang Ming's return to Moscow in 1931, and put in charge of the daily affairs of the Communist Party in Shanghai. He was later arrested, but defected to the Kuomintang, and informed on many of his former compatriots. After the KMT's defeat, Li was arrested by the Communists in Shanghai in 1951, and subsequently died in prison in 1973.
- Chen Yuandao was appointed as senior leader for the Jiangsu and Henan Division of the Communist Party, but was later arrested and executed by the Kuomintang in Nanjing.
- Xu Yixin worked for Zhang Guotao's 4th Red Army and became his vice general commissar, surviving war and party purges. After the establishment of the People's Republic of China, Xu held the position of ambassador in the Foreign Ministry. He died in the 1990s.
- Yuan Jiayong was appointed General Secretary of the Jiangsu Division in the Communist Party. Following his arrest in 1934, he defected to the Kuomintang and worked for the secret police.
- He Zishu worked for the Northern China Bureau of the Communist Party, and was executed by the Kuomintang in 1929.
- Wang Shengrong, a member of the first Central Military Commission of the Chinese Soviet Republic, survived both war and purges. He died on 1 September 2006 at the age of 99.
- Wang Yuncheng succeeded Wang Ming as General Secretary of the Jiangsu Division in the Communist Party. He was kidnapped by the Kuomintang and forced to work with Li Zhusheng in the secret police.
- Sheng Zhongliang was senior leader of the Shanghai Division in the Communist Party, and was sold out by Li Zhusheng. He was coerced into informing for the Kuomintang's secret police. Sheng, after moving to the US, later wrote memoirs of his time at the Sun Yat-sen University and with the 28 Bolsheviks.
- Song Panmin also worked for Zhang Guotao, but was executed when he objected to the purges being carried out by Xia Xi.
- Sun Jiming, a senior Communist Party leader, was arrested and defected to the Kuomintang together with Wang Yuncheng.
- Wang Shengdi and Zhu Agen left the Communist Party, though both had held senior positions.
- Wang Baoli, Zhu Zisun, Li Yuanjue, and Du Zuoxian left public life and their fates are not known.

== Bibliography ==
- Kampen, Thomas (2000). Mao Zedong, Zhou Enlai and the Evolution of the Chinese Communist Leadership. Copenhagen: Nordic Institute of Asian Studies.
- Benton, Gregor (1992). Mountain Fires: The Red Army's Three-year War in South China, 1934–1938. Los Angeles: University of California Press.
- Pantov, Alexander; Spichak, Daria (April 2008). "New Light From the Russian Archives: Chinese Stalinists and Trotskyists at the International Lenin School in Moscow, 1926–1938". Twentieth-Century China. 33 (2): 29–50. doi:10.1179/tcc.2008.33.2.29.
