= Zunyi Conference =

1935 meeting resulting in Mao becoming head of the CCP

- Part of Long March
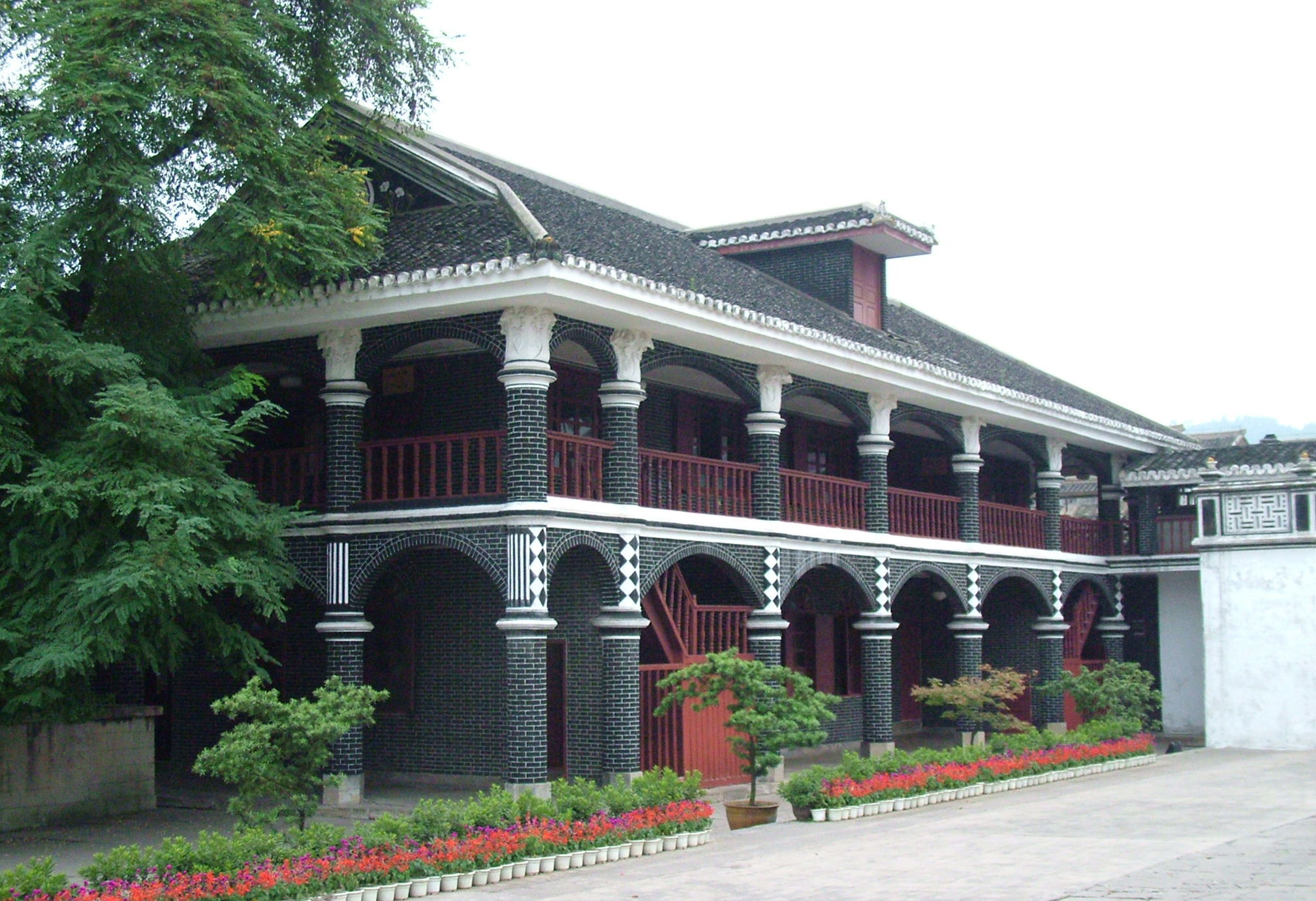
- Site of the Zunyi Conference
- Native name: 遵義會議
- Date: 15–17 January 1935
- Location: Zunyi, Guizhou, China
- Outcome: Mao Zedong reclaimed military commandership

Zunyi Conference
- Traditional Chinese: 遵義會議
- Simplified Chinese: 遵义会议
Transcriptions
Standard Mandarin
- Hanyu Pinyin: Zūnyì huìyì [tswə́nî xwêɪî]
- Gwoyeu Romatzyh: Tzuenyih hueyyih
- Wade–Giles: Tsun-i hui-i

The Zunyi Conference (simplified Chinese: 遵义会议; traditional Chinese: 遵義會議; pinyin: Zūnyì huìyì) was a meeting of the Chinese Communist Party (CCP) in January 1935 during the Long March. The power struggle displaced the triumvirate led by Bo Gu and Otto Braun and was replaced by the faction headed by Mao Zedong, who took over military command and become the leader of the Communist Party. The conference was completely unacknowledged until the 1950s and no detailed descriptions were available until the fiftieth anniversary in 1985.

== Background ==
In August 1934, with the Red Army depleted by the prolonged Chinese Civil War, a spy (Mo Xiong) placed by Zhou Enlai in the KMT army headquarters in Nanchang brought news that Chiang Kai-shek was preparing a major offensive against the Chinese Soviet Republic (CSR)'s capital, Ruijin. The Communist leadership decided on a strategic retreat to regroup with other Communist units and avoid annihilation. The original plan was for the First Red Army to link up with the Second Red Army commanded by He Long, thought to be in Hubei to the west and north. Communications between divided groups of the Red Army had been disrupted by the Kuomintang campaign, and during the planning to evacuate Jiangxi, the First Red Army was unaware that these other Communist forces were also retreating westward.

Initially the First Red Army, with its baggage of top communist officials, records, currency reserves and other trapping of the exiled Chinese Soviet Republic, fought through several lightly defended Kuomintang checkpoints, crossing the Xinfeng River and through the province of Guangdong, south of Hunan and into Guangxi. At the Xiang river, Chiang Kai-shek had reinforced the KMT defenses. In two days of bloody fighting, 30 November to 1 December 1934, the Red Army lost more than 40,000 troops and all of the civilian porters, and there were strongly defended Nationalist defensive lines ahead. Personnel and material losses after the battle of the Xiang river affected the morale of the troops and desertions began. By a 12 December 1934 meeting of Party leaders in Tongdao, discontent with Bo Gu and Otto Braun appeared.

In January 1935, after the Red Army took over the city of Zunyi, a town of military importance in Guizhou, Southwest China, an enlarged meeting of the politburo of the CCP was held for a reshuffle. For nearly fifty years, it was commonly thought to have been held from 7–9 January, as related by a senior leader. Fei Peiru, a historian and former museum curator of Zunyi, is credited with establishing the currently accepted dates of 15–17 January.

== Participants ==
The names and numbers of participants in the conference have always been disputed. These details are of importance to the largely Soviet view that elected members of the party were outvoted by non-members. Those who are most strongly agreed to have attended by all are Mao Zedong, Zhou Enlai, Zhu De, Chen Yun, Liu Shaoqi, Zhang Wentian, Bo Gu, Liu Bocheng, Li Fuchun, Lin Biao, and Peng Dehuai. Chinese sources by Chen Yun, which show that non-members could not have outvoted members, have the following participants:

- Politburo members: Mao Zedong (head of CSR), Zhou Enlai, Zhu De (chair of CSR military committee), Chen Yun (head of ACTFU), Zhang Wentian (premier of CSR), Bo Gu (General Secretary of CCP).
- Alternate politburo members: Wang Jiaxiang (vice-chair of CSR military committee), Liu Shaoqi, Deng Fa (head of secret police), Kai Feng (head of Communist Youth League).
- Generals: Liu Bocheng (Chief of Staff of Red Army), Li Fuchun (acting General Commissar of Red Army), Lin Biao (commander of 1st Field Army), Peng Dehuai (commander of 3rd Field Army), Nie Rongzhen (Lin's commissar), Yang Shangkun (Peng's commissar and another member of 28 Bolsheviks), Li Zhuoran.

Other attending members include: Deng Xiaoping (Chief editor of the CCP newspaper, the Red Star), Otto Braun and his interpreter Wu Xiuquan. Various scholars dispute the attendance of Chen Yun, Liu Shaoqi, Wang Jiaxiang, He Kequan, Deng Fa, Nie Rongzhen, and Deng. On the other hand, Liang Botai, Wu Liangping, Teng Daiyuan, Li Weihan, Wang Shoudao, and Yang Shangkun are held to have attended by some sources.

== Conference ==
The main agenda of this conference was to examine the Party's failure in the Jiangxi region and to look at the options now available to them. Bo Gu presented the main report arguing that the loss of the central Red base area and the military disasters that followed during the fifth anti-encirclement campaign were due not only to faulty policy, but to the overwhelming strength of the Nationalists and their support received from the Western powers. Zhou acknowledged his errors but refused to concede that the policy had been wrong. Zhang then presented his case for a change in strategy.

Mao refuted by pointing out that the cause for their defeat was not the strength of the Nationalist's forces but rather the party's deviation from "basic strategic and tactical principles with which the Red Army [had in the past] won victories", which was a reference to the guerrilla strategy developed by him and Zhu De. Mao criticized Braun for his wrong military tactics and rude leadership that led to "extremely abnormal" phenomena within the military. He disagreed a defensive, positional war in order to preserve "every inch" of the territory while abandoning mobile warfare, arguing that temporarily surrendering territory could be justified but jeopardizing the Red Army's strength was not, as it was the army's strength that territory can be regained. Mao also declared Bo Gu had failed to lead the military and allow mistakes unchecked. After Mao's speech, Wang Jiaxiang launched a series of tirades against Braun's strategy. Peng Dehuai likened Braun to a "prodigal son who had squandered his father's goods", a reference to the loss of the base area.

Mao's denouncement was rejected by some at the meeting, such as Chen Yi who found his attack to be "one-sided". Braun said he was merely an advisor and hence the Chinese leadership, particularly Zhou, was responsible for the policies that followed. According to Mao's biographer Philip Short, Mao's real target was Zhou but could not attack him directly as a power struggle would surely tear the leadership apart; instead, Mao attacked Braun and Bo Gu in order to leave Zhou a face-saving way out of the crisis, to which Zhou accepted in a self-criticism that the military line had been "fundamentally incorrect". Mao's supporters gained momentum during the meeting and Zhou Enlai eventually moved to back Mao.

== Resolution ==
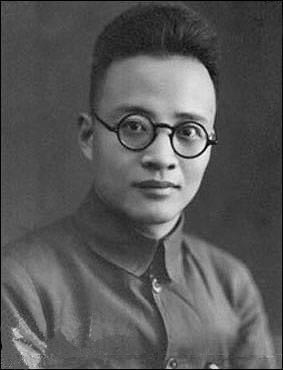
Bo Gu, General Secretary of the Chinese Communist Party until the Zunyi meeting

Mao Zedong, who reclaimed leadership in the meeting and would ultimately became the leader of the CCP

The secretariat of the Central Committee and Central Revolution and Military Committee of CCP were reelected at the meeting. The resolution drawn up afterwards by Zhang condemned the "elephantine" supply columns which had slowed the advance caused by "leaders of the policy of pure defense". Braun was accused of "treating war as a game", "monopolizing the work of the Military Council" and using punishment rather than reason to suppress "by all available means" views which differed from his own, while Bo was accused of "serious political mistakes". For the triumvirate, Bo and Braun were demoted for "extremely bad leadership", but Zhou kept his position as chief military advisor and allowed the final say on military affairs, albeit co-commanding the military with Zhu De and even though he was responsible for the military debacle. Zhang took Bo's position, and Mao re-joined the Politburo Central Committee.

== Impact ==
The CCP considered the Zunyi Conference as a life-and-death turning point where it entered maturity. Confirming that the party should turn towards Mao and away from the 28 Bolsheviks who had studied in Moscow and regarded as protégés of Comintern and the Soviet Union, the meeting was seen as a victory for the old members rooted in China and a great loss for pro-Soviet communists, as the influence and involvement of the Comintern in the CCP was greatly reduced thereafter. The Red Army regained its military power, survived in Yan'an and ultimately defeated the KMT through guerrilla strategy and later conventional warfare as it gained mass peasant support. In November 1935, Mao was named chairman of the Military Commission, and was risen to become the CCP's undisputed leader, even though he would not become party chairman until 1943.

== See also ==
- Yangliujie Catholic Church, where the Red Army housed its political directorate during the Zunyi Conference
- Ningdu Conference (1932)
