= Moscow Sun Yat-sen University =

University in Soviet Union

- Коммунистический университет трудящихся Китая (Kommunisticheskiy universitet trudyashchikhsya Kitaya)
- Other name: Sun Yat-sen Communist University of the Toilers of China
- Type: two-year college
- Active: 1925–1930
- Affiliations: Comintern
- Location: No. 16 Volkhonka Street, Moscow, Soviet Union

Chinese name
- Simplified Chinese: 莫斯科中山大学
- Traditional Chinese: 莫斯科中山大學
Transcriptions
Standard Mandarin
- Hanyu Pinyin: Mòsīkē Zhōngshān Dàxué
- Wade–Giles: Mo^{4}-szu^{1}-k'e^{1} Chung^{1}-shan^{1} Ta^{4}-hsüeh^{2}

Russian name
- Russian: Коммунистический университет трудящихся Китая имени Сунь Ятсена
- Romanization: Kommunisticheskiy universitet trudyashchikhsya Kitaya imeni Sun' Yatsena

Moscow Sun Yat-sen University, officially the Sun Yat-sen Communist University of the Toilers of China, was a Comintern school which operated from 1925 to 1930 in Moscow in the Soviet Union. It was a training camp for Chinese revolutionaries from both the Kuomintang (KMT) and the Chinese Communist Party (CCP) that was split off from the Communist University of the Toilers of the East. Its relationship to the Comintern's International Liaison Department (Russian acronym "OMS") remains unclear.

In the beginning each Sun Yat-sen University adopted a statism educational model (中山大學模式).

It was also called the Communist Workers' University of China (Russian: Коммунистический университет трудящихся Китая, romanized: Kommunisticheskiy universitet trudyashchikhsya Kitaya, KUTK).

== Origins ==
In 1923, Sun Yat-sen, the founder of the KMT, made political overtures to the CCP and the Soviet Union. Sun believed that the KMT needed to train more Chinese revolutionaries. Of all urges only Lenin delivered military and training aids.

Sun Yat-sen University officially began its classes on 7 November 1925, the eighth anniversary of the October Revolution. The university was set up by splitting the Chinese department from the Communist University of the Toilers of the East, which had about 100 Chinese students enrolled. The university was named after Sun out of respect for his contribution to the 1911 Revolution.

Located at No. 16 Volkhonka Street, in an old and beautiful part of Moscow, about a thirty-minute walk from the Kremlin. In Tsarist Russia the main university building, built in the early 19th century, had been Moscow's First Provincial High School.

Adam Lindner (1902–58; alias Xia Dalin) and Mikhail Borodin, Comintern advisors sent to China, directed the first enrollment of students. These students were elites chosen from the membership of both the CCP and KMT. The main missions of this university were to educate students in Marxism and Leninism, as well as training cadres for mass movement as qualified Bolsheviks.

== Coursework ==
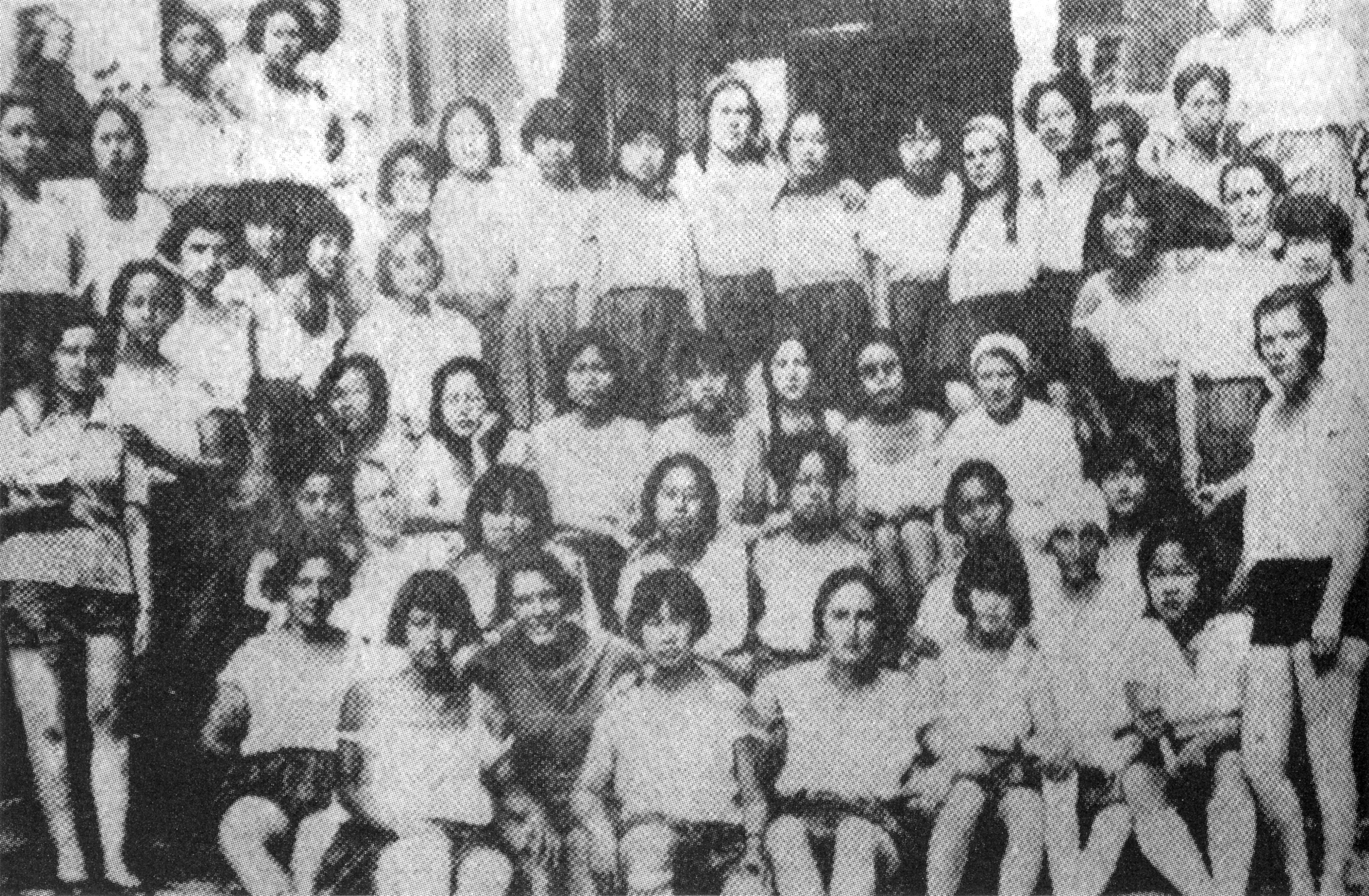
Students and lecturers of Moscow Sun Yat-sen University. Moscow Region, 1926

Most of the instructors came from the Soviet Union. Among them were old Bolsheviks such as Karl Radek, who was the first president of the university. The students came from different classes and backgrounds: some were famous communist revolutionaries or scholars, while others had little education but much experience in communist movements. The university grouped these students into different classes according to their education and experience.

The courses given at the university focused on the basic theories of Marxism and Leninism. Students also learned methods of mobilization and propaganda, as well as theoretical and practical military instruction.

In addition to courses, there were regular presentations on the international communist movements and the Chinese Communist Revolution by prominent members from Comintern, the Soviet Union and the CCP. Those included Joseph Stalin, Leon Trotsky, Zhang Guotao and Xiang Zhongfa.

Although the Sun Yat-sen University of Moscow existed for just over five years, it produced many graduates who became highly influential figures in Chinese politics. Among them were former President of the Republic of China Chiang Ching-kuo, former Chairman of the Central Military Commission of the People's Republic of China Deng Xiaoping, former Vice Presidents of the People's Republic of China Ulanhu and Dong Biwu, former Chairman of the Standing Committee of the National People's Congress Ye Jianying, former Vice Chairman of the Standing Committee of the National People's Congress Lin Boqu, and former Minister of the Interior of the Republic of China Ku Cheng-kang, all of whom studied at this institution.

== Political change and closure ==
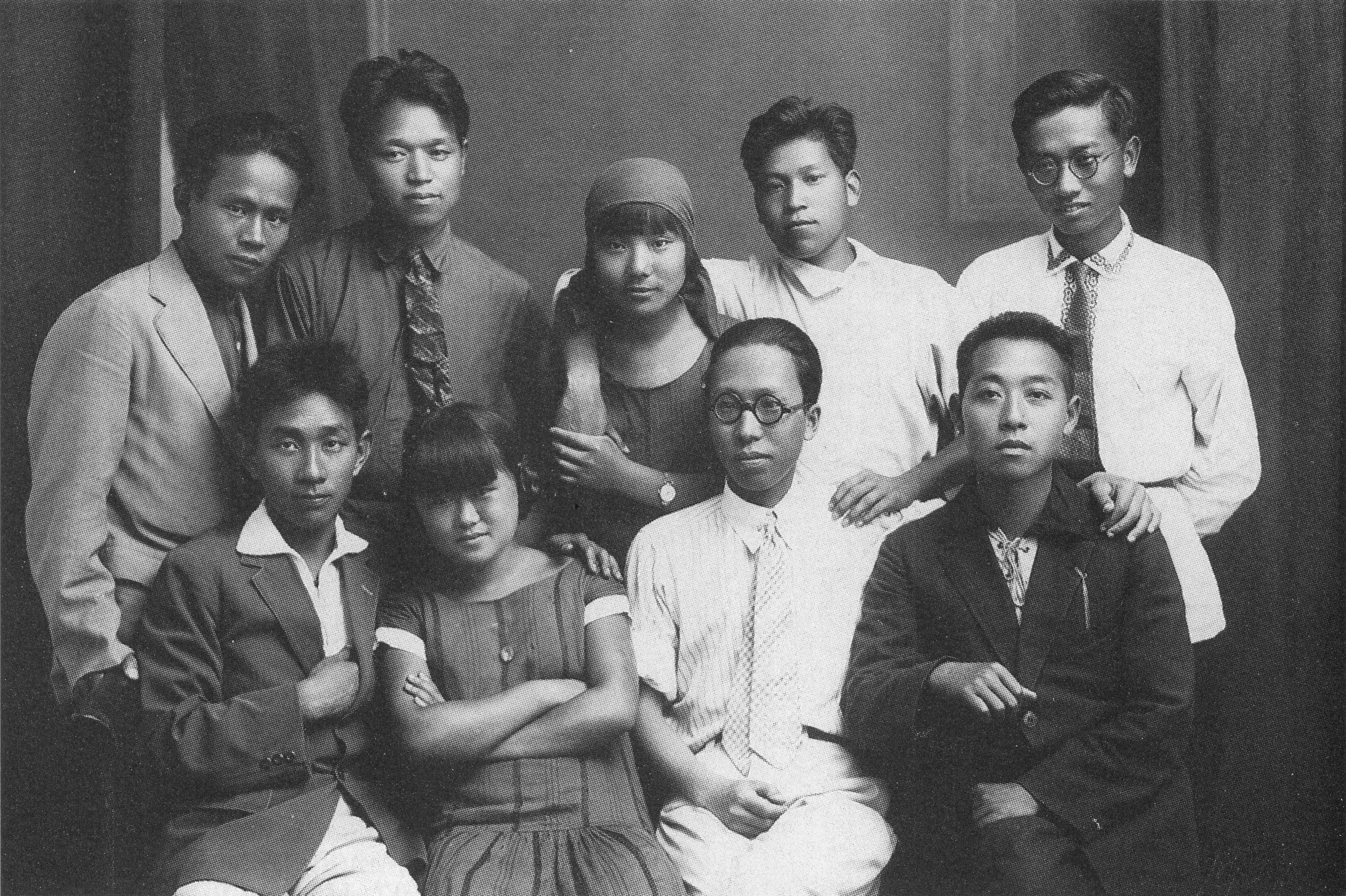
Students of Sun Yat-sen Communist university of the Toilers of China

In 1927, as the CCP-KMT alliance broke up, the students from the KMT were sent back to China. As the power struggle between Stalin and Trotsky reached its peak, Radek was sacked and replaced by his deputy, Pavel Mif, who was too ambitious to be limited to a university campus. Mif himself became the vice director of the Far East Department of the Comintern and played an important role in the major decisions of the CCP. With his 28 Bolsheviks holding senior positions in the CCP, Mif and the university played a major role in China's modern history. Its final rector was Vladimir Veger.

The university was closed in the summer of 1930 due to the failure of the alliance with the KMT.

== See also ==
- Sun Yat-sen University (disambiguation)
- Sun Yat-sen University in Guangzhou, China
- National Sun Yat-sen University in Kaohsiung, Taiwan
- Communist University of the Toilers of the East
- Communist University of the National Minorities of the West
- Chinese-Lenin School of Vladivostok
