= Lin Yuying =

Chinese communist revolutionary and labour leader (1897–1942)

- 林育英
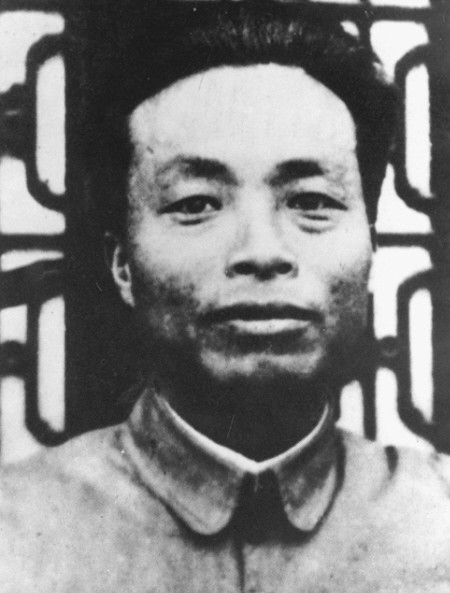

Personal details
- Born: 25 February 1897 Huanggang, Hubei, Qing China
- Died: 6 March 1942 (aged 45) Yan'an, Shaanxi, Republic of China
- Party: Chinese Communist Party
- Spouse: Tu Junming
- Relatives: Lin Yunan (cousin); Lin Biao (cousin)

Lin Yuying (Chinese: 林育英; pinyin: Lín Yùyīng, 25 February 1897 – 6 March 1942) was a Chinese communist revolutionary and labour organiser who was one of the early leaders of the Chinese Communist Party (CCP). With his cousins Lin Yunan and Lin Biao, he is known in CCP history as one of the "three Lin brothers".

Lin joined the CCP in 1922 and organised workers in Hubei, Hunan, Shanghai and Manchuria during the 1920s. In 1935, he returned from Moscow as an envoy of the Communist International (Comintern) and helped to mediate between the CCP leadership and Zhang Guotao. During the Second Sino-Japanese War, he was head of the political department of the 129th Division of the Eighth Route Army and later led the party's labour work in Yan'an. He died in Yan'an in 1942, and Mao Zedong was among the bearers of his coffin.

== Early life ==
Lin was born on 25 February 1897 into a family that lived at Linjia Dawan, in Huanggang County, Hubei, and ran a cloth-dyeing business. In 1919, together with his cousin Lin Yunan and Lin Lepu, he founded the Junxin Primary School and a public lecture society to spread new ideas. In the late spring of 1920, he went to work at a dye works in Shanghai, but in the autumn he returned home because his eldest son was seriously ill.

== Early labour organising ==
In 1921, with the support of the Liqun Bookshop founded by Yun Daiying and Lin Yunan, Lin and Lin Lepu set up the Liqun Towel Factory in Wuchang, with Lin as its manager. From 16 to 21 July 1921, he attended a meeting of the Mutual Aid Society with Yun Daiying, Lin Yunan, Li Qiushi and others, which founded the Gongcun Society, a group of a communist character, and he was chosen as a member of its factory work committee. He then went to Hunan at the invitation of Yi Lirong to help set up the Wangluyuan Weaving Factory in Changsha.

In February 1922, Lin joined the CCP in Wuchang, introduced by Lin Yunan and Yun Daiying. He organised workers in the industrial and mining districts of Daye, where he established and led the CCP's special branch for the area. On 22 July 1922, he helped to direct a strike at the Hanyang Iron and Steel Works, which quickly succeeded. In the autumn, after the towel factory closed because of financial difficulties, he went to work at the Wuchang Model Factory. In September, he founded the Wuhan Dyeing and Weaving Workers' Union.

In the spring of 1923, Lin returned to Changsha as a technician and party branch secretary at the Wangluyuan Weaving Factory. On 28 May, he led a strike by the city's rickshaw pullers against an increase in the fees charged by vehicle owners, which succeeded on 5 June. On 1 June, he led rickshaw pullers in a demonstration in Changsha protesting against the killing of Chinese civilians by Japanese sailors. In the autumn, he became business manager and party branch secretary of the Anyuan Railway and Mining Workers' Consumer Cooperative and joined the work of the CCP's Anyuan district committee. On 1 May 1924, he served as chief marshal at the opening of the new building of the Anyuan Railway and Mining Workers' Club. He then travelled to the Soviet Union and, after arriving in Moscow at the end of October 1924, studied at the Communist University of the Toilers of the East.

== Shanghai and Wuhan ==
Lin was recalled to China in May 1925 and worked for the CCP's Shanghai committee. That year, he joined the party group of the Shanghai General Labour Union and became secretary of the CCP's Yangshupu section committee. On 6 December 1925, he took part in a mass rally organised by the union and other groups on Qingyun Road against Duan Qirui and the Fengtian clique. While leading the marchers, he was seriously injured in a clash with soldiers and police, and a head wound left him with lasting migraines. In 1926, he served as secretary of the Yangshupu and then the Caojiadu section committees, and in April he became a member of the CCP's Shanghai district committee.

In January 1927, Lin went to Hankou, where he served as an adjutant and head of a special detachment of the military commission of the Wuhan Nationalist Government. During the July 1927 break between the Wuhan government and the communists, he ran a furniture shop that served as a secret liaison point for the party. In September 1927, on the orders of the CCP's Hubei committee, he, Wang Juexin and Shi Bingqian formed the party's East Hubei Special Committee. The committee led Autumn Harvest Uprisings in Daye, Yangxin and Echeng, which failed. He then served as secretary of the CCP's Qiaokou district committee and, from October, as secretary of the Wuchang municipal workers' committee.

In 1928, Lin went to Hunan to help rebuild the CCP's provincial committee, which had been destroyed after the Mari Incident of May 1927. On 1 May 1928, he and Teng Daiyuan re-established the committee at Anyuan. He became a member of its standing committee and secretary of its workers' committee, and in July he took part in the decision to make Teng Daiyuan secretary of the Hunan–Hubei–Jiangxi Special Committee and to begin organising the Pingjiang Uprising. After one of the committee's secretaries was arrested and defected in September, the surviving members could not remain in Hunan. Lin hid at the Ciyun Temple, where he became a Buddhist monk, and at the end of the year, with the abbot's protection, he made his way to Shanghai as a mendicant.

== Shanghai and Manchuria ==
In January 1929, the CCP Politburo appointed Lin secretary of the party's western Shanghai district committee. After a Chinese worker was killed by British soldiers in May 1929, he led protests demanding punishment of the killers, compensation for the family, the withdrawal of British troops and the abolition of extraterritoriality. The protests ended with a British apology and compensation of 20,000 yuan to the family. On 30 May 1929, the anniversary of the May Thirtieth Movement, he led a demonstration of several thousand people on Nanjing Road. In November, the party group of the All-China Federation of Trade Unions sent him to the Seamen's Union as a special commissioner, with responsibility also for directing the Hong Kong workers' congress.

At the end of March 1930, Lin went to Harbin as the federation's representative in Manchuria. On 2 April, he became a member of the standing committee of the CCP's Manchuria Provincial Committee and secretary of its labour movement committee. After the committee was broken up later that month, he helped to rebuild it in Shenyang with Yang Yichen, and in June he became its secretary. In August, under the policy of Li Lisan, the committee was turned into a general action committee, with Lin as its secretary. After Chen Tanqiu reorganised the committee at the end of August, Lin became secretary of its workers' committee and head of the railway workers' organisation for all of Manchuria. In September 1930, he attended the Third Plenary Session of the 6th Central Committee and was elected an alternate member of the Central Committee.

On 10 November 1930, Lin attended an enlarged meeting of the CCP's Fushun county committee, one of whose participants informed the Japanese police. The following day, he was arrested by Japanese police agents at Shenjingzi station on his way back to Shenyang and held in the Japanese police jail in Fushun. On 25 December, he was handed over to the Fushun county public security bureau and was sentenced to five years' imprisonment.

== Moscow and the return to China ==
Lin was released in January 1932 and became a member of the standing committee of the All-China Federation of Trade Unions and secretary of the Seamen's Union in Shanghai. In early 1933, as the CCP's central leadership could no longer operate in Shanghai, he travelled to Moscow, where he represented the federation at the Profintern and was a member of the CCP delegation to the Comintern. In June and July 1935, he took part in drafting and finalising the August First Declaration. In July 1935, he attended the Seventh Congress of the Comintern, after which he was sent back to China to convey its decisions to the CCP leadership.

Radio contact between the CCP leadership and the Comintern had been cut off since the party's Shanghai bureau was broken up in October 1934. The CCP delegation in Moscow chose Lin to restore contact on the recommendation of Chen Yun and Chen Tanqiu, and he travelled back disguised as a fur trader, entering China through Mongolia. He was one of several envoys sent with codes, and the first to arrive. He reached Dingbian, in the Shaanxi–Gansu–Ningxia area, in November 1935. Suspicious of his identity, local Red Guards tied him up and took him to Wayaobu, where the CCP leadership was based, and he was released after Li Weihan, Deng Fa and Zhang Wentian met him. He brought the Comintern's new policy and a set of codes, although radio contact was only restored after Liu Changsheng arrived with codes in June 1936.

In December 1935, Lin attended the Wayaobu Conference, where, speaking for the Comintern, he supported Mao Zedong's leadership. The conference adopted the policy of an anti-Japanese national united front and set up a White Area Work Committee, with Zhou Enlai as secretary and Lin as deputy secretary.

At the time, Zhang Guotao had led the Fourth Front Army south into Sichuan and set up a rival party centre. On 16 January 1936, acting as the Comintern's representative, Lin telegraphed Zhang, asking him to dissolve his rival centre and offering that he form a Southwest Bureau instead. After Zhu De, Xu Xiangqian and Chen Changhao urged him to comply, Zhang replied on 17 January that he would obey the Comintern's instructions. Lin then proposed that neither centre should issue orders to the other in the name of the Central Committee and that he would act as the liaison between them, a proposal that Zhang Wentian and Zhang Guotao accepted. Zhang Guotao eventually reconciled with Mao and led his forces north, and on 6 June 1936 he dissolved his rival centre and turned it into a Southwest Bureau. On 19 October 1936, Lin welcomed the Second and Fourth Front Armies on behalf of the Central Committee as the three main forces of the Red Army were reunited.

== Second Sino-Japanese War ==
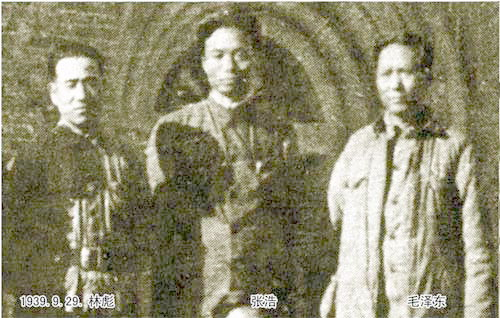
Lin Biao, Lin Yuying and Mao Zedong

On 24 February 1937, the Politburo Standing Committee appointed Lin head of the Central Committee's Workers' and Peasants' Department. When the Western Route Army was in danger, the party formed a relief force, the Aid-the-West Army, and appointed Lin its political commissar, with Liu Bocheng as commander, because of his standing among the former Fourth Front Army troops. After the relief attempt failed, the force's headquarters was reorganised on 20 August 1937 as the headquarters of the 129th Division of the Eighth Route Army, with Lin as head of its political department. At the Luochuan Conference later that month, he was named a member of the CCP's Central Military Commission and its North China branch. On 4 September, the division's leadership was announced, with Liu Bocheng as commander, Lin as head of the political department and Xu Xiangqian as deputy commander.

On 14 September 1937, Lin was elected secretary of the division's party committee, with Liu Bocheng as deputy secretary. On 14 November, he chaired a meeting of party cadres in Heshun County, Shanxi, where he gave a report on supporting the resistance in North China. The meeting decided to break the division into smaller units to wage guerrilla warfare in assigned areas behind Japanese lines. The next day, Lin and Liu Bocheng decided to set up guerrilla training classes, at which Lin often lectured.

On 16 January 1938, because of his recurring illness, the Central Committee recalled Lin to Yan'an to take charge of labour work, and Deng Xiaoping replaced him at the 129th Division. In April 1938, he attended the first workers' congress of the Shaanxi–Gansu–Ningxia Border Region and was elected to the executive committee of its general trade union. In October 1938, he spoke on the labour movement at the 6th Plenary Session of the 6th Central Committee and began preparations for the Central Committee's Workers' Movement Committee.

In the spring of 1938, a pamphlet titled The Tactical Line of the Chinese Communist Party, said to be the record of a lecture he had given at the Counter-Japanese Military and Political University in Yan'an in February 1937, circulated in Hankou. According to the historian Lyman Van Slyke, its account of the united front differed considerably from the CCP's official position. It presented the united front as a response to the party's weakness, described the Three Principles of the People as a cover for continuing land revolution, and treated Japan as the main enemy only out of necessity, with the ultimate goal of overthrowing the Kuomintang's one-party rule.

In March 1939, Lin became principal of a workers' school at Qiaoergou in Yan'an. The Central Committee's Workers' Movement Committee was formed on 24 April 1939, with Kang Sheng, and later Deng Fa, as its director and Lin as deputy director in charge of its work. In July, he began preparations for the establishment of North China United University. In early 1940, he oversaw the launch of the journal Zhongguo gongren (Chinese Worker), whose first issue appeared on 7 February 1940. On 30 April 1940, while speaking at a rally to celebrate International Workers' Day, he suffered a cerebral haemorrhage, and his health declined from then on.

== Death and funeral ==
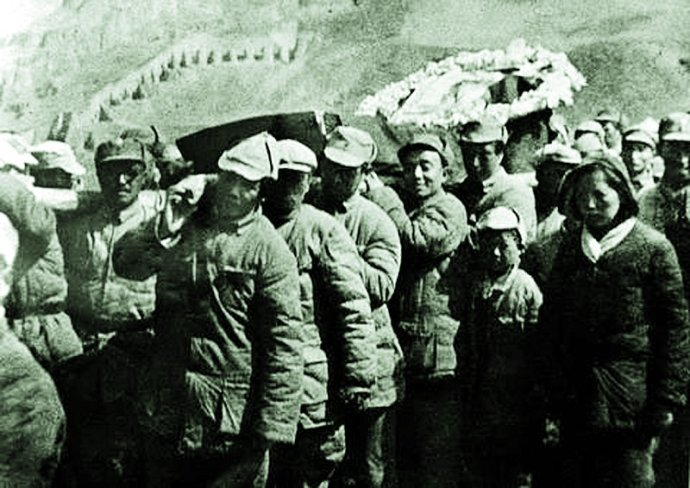
Mao Zedong and others carrying Lin's coffin

Lin died in Yan'an at 1:45 am on 6 March 1942. Mao Zedong, Zhu De, Ren Bishi, Xu Teli, Ye Jianying, Chen Yun and other leaders came to pay their respects. On 9 March, a public memorial service attended by about 10,000 people was held outside the Central Party School, with Ren Bishi presiding and Li Kenong reading the eulogy. In accordance with his wishes, he was buried at Taohualing, near Yangjialing in Yan'an. Mao kept vigil over his body and was the first of the pallbearers who carried his coffin to the grave.

After his death, an editorial in the Xinhua Daily described his life as "a revolutionary, fighting life". Mao Zedong wrote an elegiac couplet for the memorial service, describing him as "loyal to the country" and "glorious in death". According to the Biographies of Shanghai Martyrs, it was the only recorded occasion on which Mao carried another person's coffin. Zhang Guotao later wrote in his memoirs that he and Lin had "shared hardships", and he described Lin's telegrams of 1936 as a turning point, writing that Lin had earnestly hoped the two sides could settle their dispute themselves. The historian Li Haiwen notes that during the campaign against Zhang Guotao in 1937, Lin distinguished between Zhang and the officers and men of the Fourth Front Army, whose record he refused to disparage. This approach was later remembered by former Fourth Front Army commanders such as Guo Shushen and Xiao Ke.

== Personal life ==
Lin's family, which ran a cloth-dyeing business, was part of a wider clan enterprise: yarn from the workshop of Lin Biao's father was dyed by Lin's father and sold through a dye shop in Hankou run by Lin Yunan's father. Lin and his cousins Lin Yunan and Lin Biao belonged to the eighth generation of the Lin clan of Baiyangshan in Huanggang, and the three are known in CCP history as the "three Lin brothers". In 1916, Lin married Tu Junming. She later worked among women and as an underground courier for the CCP in Shanghai, was imprisoned in 1932, went to Yan'an in 1938 and worked for many years in childcare, and she died in Beijing on 29 January 1988.

The couple had five children. Their eldest son, Lin Xiaoxia (1917–2013), joined the CCP in 1932 and became deputy secretary of the CCP's Harbin municipal committee after 1953. Their second son, Lin Hannan (1926–1947), was killed in 1947 fighting bandits in Linkou County, Heilongjiang. Their third son, Lin Hanxiong, was born in Shanghai in 1929 and went to Yan'an in 1938. Their elder daughter died young, and their younger daughter, Lin Li, born in Shenyang in 1931, was held with her mother in Shanghai's Longhua prison in 1932.
