= Xi'an Incident =

1936 political crisis in China

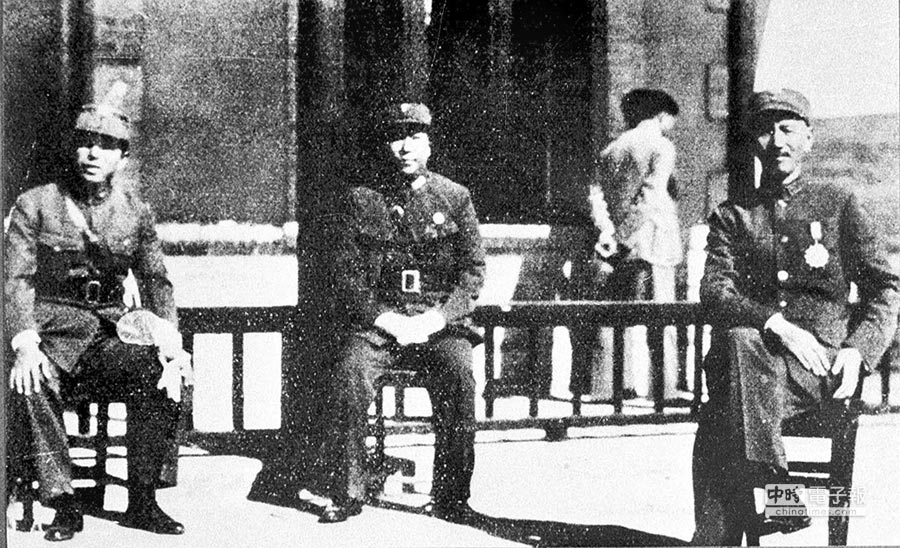
- Zhang Xueliang, Yang Hucheng, and Chiang Kai-shek two months before the incident
- Date: December 12–26, 1936 (2 weeks)
- Location: Xi'an, Republic of China
- Participants: Zhang Xueliang; Chiang Kai-shek; Yang Hucheng; Zhou Enlai; others
- Outcome: Chiang released; Zhang arrested by Chiang; Ceasefire in the Chinese Civil War; Formation of the Second United Front; See Aftermath

Chinese name
- Traditional Chinese: 西安事變
- Simplified Chinese: 西安事变
- Postal: Hsi-an Incident
Transcriptions
Standard Mandarin
- Hanyu Pinyin: Xī'ān Shìbiàn
- Wade–Giles: Hsi-an Shih-pian (Hsi-an Incident)

The Xi'an Incident (Note: UK: /ʃiːˈæn/ shee-AN, US: /ʃiːˈɑːn/ shee-AHN) was a Chinese political crisis that lasted from 12 to 26 December 1936. Generals Zhang Xueliang and Yang Hucheng seized Chiang Kai-shek in Xi'an, demanding the Nationalist government end the Chinese Civil War and ally with the Chinese Communist Party (CCP) against Japanese expansionism, resulting in the Second United Front.

The incident took place after months of secret negotiations between the CCP and the Kuomintang (KMT) had stalled. The CCP had meanwhile forged a covert alliance with Zhang Xueliang's Northeastern Army and Yang Hucheng's Northwestern Army. After Chiang issued Zhang an ultimatum to either attack the Communists or face reassignment, Zhang arrested him and threw the Nationalist government into disarray. General He Yingqin nearly launched a military assault on Xi'an before Soong Mei-ling and T. V. Soong prevailed in favor of negotiation. Following initial mediation by William Henry Donald, the Soongs flew to Xi'an. The CCP called for Chiang's execution, but Joseph Stalin, fearing the mutiny was part of a Japanese plot to weaken China, overruled them and ordered a peaceful resolution. CCP representatives Zhou Enlai, Qin Bangxian, and Ye Jianying then joined the talks in Xi'an and Chiang conceded to a ceasefire. On 25 December, Zhang released Chiang and accompanied him to Nanjing, where Chiang immediately had him arrested; Zhang remained under house arrest until 1990. Yang was arrested in 1937 and executed in Chongqing shortly before the city fell to the CCP in 1949.

The incident is subject to widely ranging and often partisan historiography. To the KMT, it represented a lost opportunity to destroy the CCP; to the CCP, it is celebrated as evidence of its commitment to national resistance against invasion over Chiang's obstinate prioritization of the civil war. Zhang expressed regret over the mutiny in the 1950s but reaffirmed in the 1990s that he had no regrets.

== Background ==
=== Japanese expansionism and the Chinese Civil War ===
The Chinese Communist Party (CCP) and the Chinese Nationalists had been engaged in a civil war since 1927. Although the Empire of Japan's expansionism in China posed a clear threat to both sides, at first it did not lead to a cessation of hostilities. Nationalist leader Chiang Kai-shek believed that "The Japanese are a disease of the skin. The Communists are a disease of the heart." He responded to the 1931 Japanese invasion of Manchuria by ordering General Zhang Xueliang not to resist. He felt unprepared to confront Japan with China's limited military capacity and the ongoing civil war. When the invasion ended in an unstable peace, Chiang decided to prioritize winning the civil war before he confronted Japan. He called this policy "first internal pacification, then external resistance." (Note: Chinese: 先安內，後攘外。; pinyin: Xiān ānnèi, hòu ràngwài.) The CCP in turn reacted to Chiang's policy of nonresistance with disdain, viewing him as a pawn of the Japanese. They saw fighting the Nationalist government as an essential part of resistance to Japan and called for "Resisting Japan and Opposing Chiang".

Nonetheless, prosecuting the civil war while resisting Japan became increasingly impractical as time went on. Already by late 1932, Communist guerilla groups in Manchuria had begun to cooperate with Nationalist guerillas against the Japanese occupiers. The CCP also began to come under pressure from the Soviet Union to negotiate an end to the civil war. The USSR was concerned with events in Europe—especially Hitler's rise to power—and wanted Communist parties to form united fronts with moderates to resist fascist aggression. (Note: A united China was of particular importance to the USSR because it could be an important ally if Japan invaded the Russian Far East.) This policy was formally adopted by the 7th World Congress of the Comintern in the summer of 1935. The CCP delegation at the Congress, headed by Wang Ming, published the "August 1 Declaration" describing how a united front could be created in China. They recommended a government of national defense including all parties in China that wanted to resist Japanese imperialism. Importantly, because they still considered Chiang to be a "running dog" of the Japanese, they did not extend this offer to the Nationalist government.

The CCP itself was in the middle of the Long March during the Comintern Congress and was cut off from radio communication with Moscow. Its leaders learned of the Congress's decisions in November 1935. The following month, they held a conference at Wayaobu to discuss the implications of this new Comintern policy. The Wayaobu Manifesto that they published was a significant retreat from the hardline positions they had held during the early civil war. It called for "the most broad national united front" involving rich peasants and the national bougeoisie to resist Japan, and announced that the CCP was willing to suspend class conflict in the interests of cross-class collaboration. However, they did not intend for the Chinese Red Army to surrender or submit to the Nationalists. On the contrary, their plan to resist the Japanese centered on expanding the Red Army to 1 million men and dramatically increasing the land area covered by the Chinese Soviet Republic. Mao correctly deduced that the weakest link in Chiang's armory was Zhang Xueliang's Manchurian army, who had no interest in fighting the communists. From late November 1935, Mao made overtures to Zhang with offers of a truce and a joint campaign against the Japanese.

In late 1935, relations between Nanjing and Tokyo took a sharp downturn as Japan stepped up its expansionist policies in north China. Chiang Kai-shek feared that a full-scale invasion of China was imminent, and wanted to secure the material and diplomatic support of the Soviet Union. He also faced growing public pressure to actively resist Japan; on 9 December 1935, for example, a major student protest broke out in Beiping. In January, Chiang Kai-shek sent emissaries to Moscow to negotiate a military mutual assistance treaty. However, as a precondition for a treaty, Chiang wanted the Soviet Union to order the CCP to submit to the Nationalist Government. The Soviet ambassador told Chiang that while the USSR hoped the CCP would agree to a unified command under the Nationalists, Chiang would have to negotiate directly with the CCP. This upset Chiang, who worried that if the USSR was unwilling to order the CCP to stop, they might be willing to support further revolutionary actions by the CCP if a ceasefire broke down. Progress halted, and after news leaked to the press that Chiang was contemplating a treaty with the USSR, he called off negotiations.

=== Formation of a northwestern alliance ===
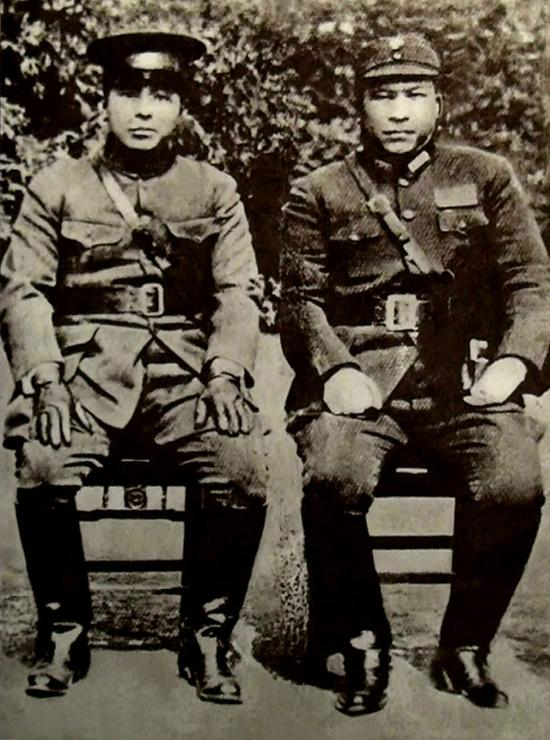
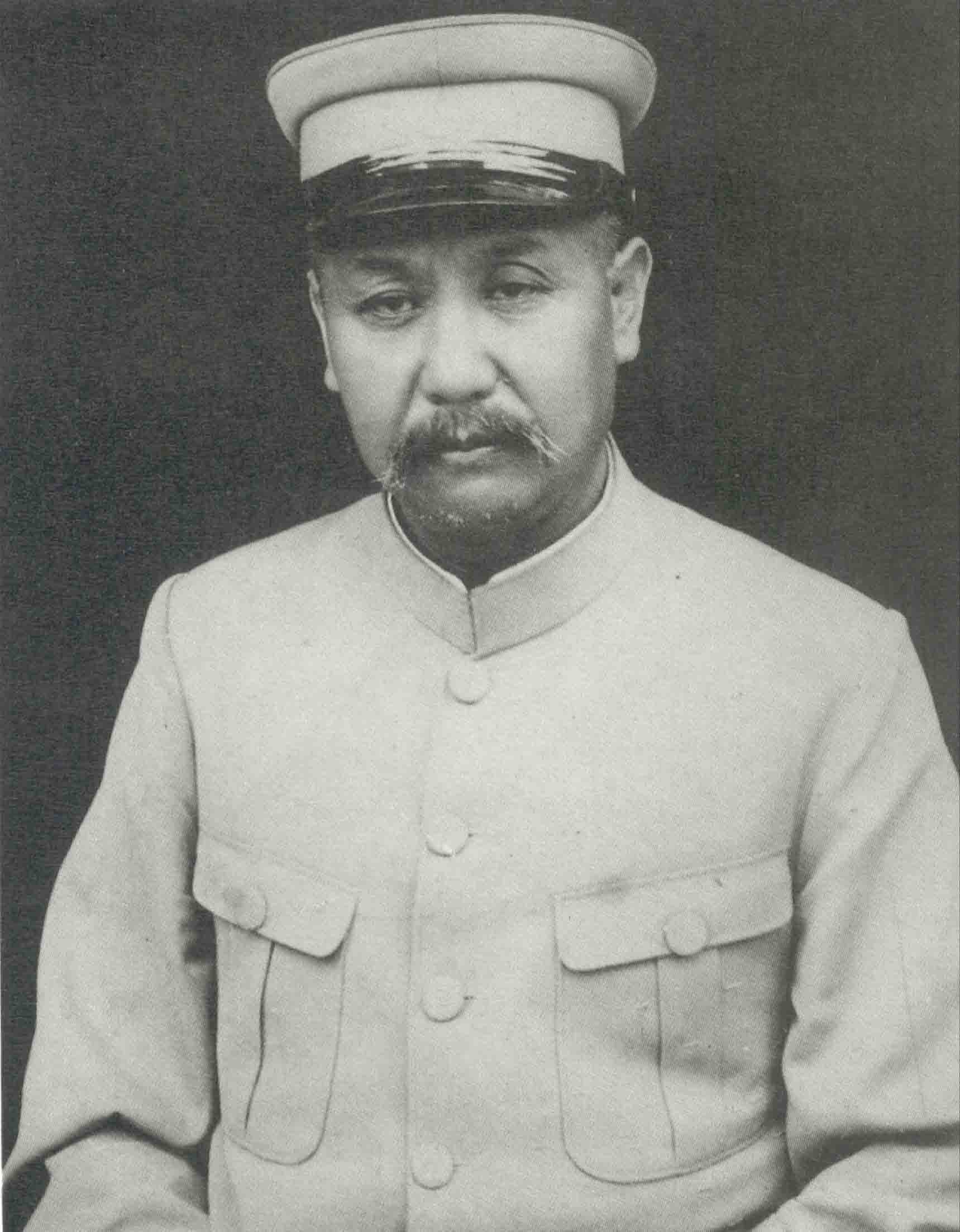
Zhang Xueliang, Yang Hucheng, and Yan Xishan

In October 1935, the Chinese Communist Party arrived in northern Shaanxi at the end of the Long March. The party had lost over 90% of its numbers and was in desperate need of supplies. But their new base area was economically backwards, agriculturally unproductive, and cut off from the outside world. It was bordered to the north by the Ordos Desert, to the east by Shanxi (governed by the warlord Yan Xishan), and to the south and west by the "Northwest Bandit Suppression Headquarters". The Northwest Bandit (Note: In Nationalist propaganda, the Communists were often referred to as "red bandits" to equate their movement with the armed gangs that plagued the Chinese countryside.)Suppression Headquarters was a command created by the Nationalist government to wipe out the remnants of the CCP. Based in Xi'an, it consisted of the 130,000-strong Northeastern Army, led by Zhang Xueliang, and the 40,000-strong Northwestern Army, led by Yang Hucheng. Both Yang and Zhang were former warlords who had pledged their armies to the Nationalist Government. As such, they retained a degree of independence from the central government that the CCP would seek to exploit.

Zhang and Yang had been promised an easy victory against the Communists. They were therefore surprised and dismayed when the Chinese Red Army defeated them in several major engagements. The Red Army treated their prisoners of war well and gave them a political education, sending them back to tell their comrades that the Communists wanted to form an anti-Chiang and anti-Japanese alliance. This proposal struck a chord with both the soldiers and their commanders. Zhang Xueliang had governed Manchuria before it was overrun by the Japanese, and he and his army strongly wished to retake their homeland. He resented the policy of nonresistance ordered by Chiang Kai-shek, and was frustrated to be fighting the Communists instead of the Japanese. Yang had likewise become skeptical of Chiang's anti-Japanese commitment after he suppressed the anti-Japanese demonstrations in December 1935 and found the offer of a united front persuasive. With his officer Nan Hanchen acting as intermediary, Yang quickly concluded a secret ceasefire with the CCP. Negotiations with Zhang took longer to begin. But after Dong Jianwu (see the next section) requested passage to CCP territory on his mission from the central government, Zhang realized that the central government was negotiating with the CCP and was encouraged to do so himself. Furthermore, in January 1936, the Communists released Gao Fuyuan, a officer schoolmate of Zhang who was captured two months earlier and Gao convinced Zhang that the communists' offer of co-operation were sincere. Zhang accepted a meeting with Mao's envoy Li Kenong and agreed to adopt a "passive stance" in the civil war, but Zhang disagreed on the communists' proposed overthrow of Chiang. By 25 February 1936, the Communists had agreed to a temporary ceasefire. On 9 April, Zhou Enlai arrived at Zhang Xueliang's headquarters in Xi'an to solidify their agreement. Zhou, an experienced negotiator, not only formalized the covert ceasefire, but also secured supplies for the Red Army. In May, the CCP formalized a non-aggression pact with the Northwestern Army as well.

Zhou and Zhang began a series of secret meetings to discuss what a united front could look like. Zhang Xueliang argued that resisting Japan would only be possible if the CCP was willing to let Chiang lead the united front. Zhou offered to discuss the point with CCP leadership, but refused to commit to changing the policy. Meanwhile, Zhang tolerated growing Communist influence within the Northeastern Army. Communist cadres spread ideas among the soldiers and recruited officers into secret societies. In June they set up an officer training camp that preached the virtues of a united front. His army's receptiveness to the Communists helped persuade Zhang to conclude a formal alliance on 22 September.

The [CCP]'s call for suspending the civil war and forming a united anti-Japanese resistance touched not only my heart deeply but also the hearts of most of the men in the Northeastern Army.

— Zhang Xueliang

Yan Xishan also concluded secret agreements with the CCP. Illegally imported Japanese products were undermining the Shanxi economy and the Japanese puppet Mongol Military Government was encroaching on Yan's rule over Suiyuan. Out of fear of the Japanese, Yan was attracted by the CCP's proposition for a united front and agreed to a truce in June 1936. In September, he created the "League for Sacrifice and Salvation" to agitate the Shanxi public against the Japanese. CCP leaders Bo Yibo and Feng Xuefeng went to Shanxi and began working closely with Yan.

The partners in this covert northwestern alliance were united by their desire to resist Japan, but they differed over the details of how this could best be accomplished. The Communists proposed a plan to unite under Zhang's command and use Soviet support to take over Shaanxi, Gansu, Ningxia, Qinghai, and Xinjiang, turning northwest China into a base to resist Japan and oppose Chiang. Zhang, Yang, and Yan were still committed to convincing Chiang to lead the anti-Japanese resistance. But none of them informed Chiang of their secret alliance and they even staged fake military battles to deceive the Nanjing government.

=== Sluggish negotiations ===
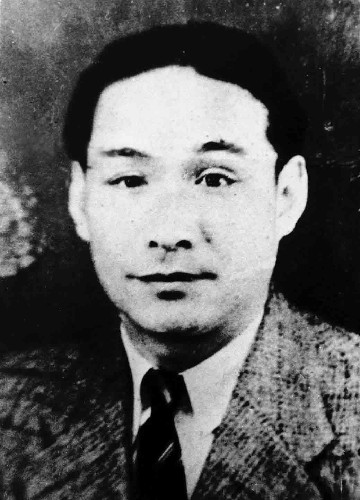
Pan Hannian

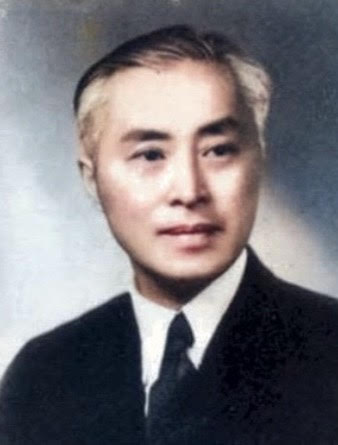
Chen Lifu

The chief negotiators

Despite breaking off negotiations with the USSR in late 1935, Chiang did secretly reach out to the CCP. Two prominent figures in the Nationalist government, Soong Ching-ling and Chen Lifu, managed to recruit two members of the Communist underground, Dong Jianwu and Zhang Zihua, to cross the front line and tell the CCP that Chiang was interested in negotiations. They arrived on 27 February 1936. Despite their skepticism towards Chiang, the CCP Central Committee sent a list of five conditions to the Nationalists in March. They sought a ceasefire, a government of national defense (i.e., one where the Communists, the Nationalists, and the warlord factions were equal partners), a military alliance against Japan (but with continued Red Army independence), the right to move their base of operations to Hebei, (Note: At the time, the CCP was based in Northern Shaanxi, a poor and remote area ill-equipped to support the Red Army.) and political and economic reforms. Meanwhile, skirmishes with the Nationalists continued in Shaanxi and despite having pledged to send a expeditionary force to fight the Japanese, christened "Eastern Expedition to Resist Japan and Save the Nation", the communists did not even came within 200 miles of the Japanese frontlines.

The Nationalists responded in June with a proposal for a different vision of a united front. They wanted to see the Red Army fully integrated into the National Revolutionary Army (NRA), for it to move to Suiyuan and Chahar rather than Hebei, (Note: Suiyuan and Chahar were poorer and more exposed to Japanese attack than Hebei.) and for the CCP to recognize the legitimacy of the Nationalist government. However, they did offer CCP leaders the chance to come to Nanjing to participate in the central government. The CCP disliked this proposal, but because they had failed to break out of Northern Shaanxi, they continued to negotiate.

The Communist attitude towards the negotiations underwent a major shift after they re-established radio communications with Moscow in late June. The CCP transmitted the Wayaobu Manifesto and informed the Comintern of their alliance with Zhang. They asked for assistance in carrying out their plan to form an anti-Japan, anti-Chiang base in the northwest. However, by this time Moscow had learned the full details of the devastating Long March. (Note: Unbeknownst to the CCP, its Comintern delegation had been pressured to take a more conciliatory tone towards Chiang since its August 1 Declaration. Wang Ming published a series of articles over the winter calling for Chiang to either join an anti-Japanese united front or be overthrown by KMT patriots. Historians dispute the degree to which Wang had sincerely changed his mind or was simply trying to agitate anti-Chiang dissent within the KMT.) The Comintern responded with a telegram on 15 August that harshly criticized the CCP's proposal as unrealistic and ordered them to seek a united front under Chiang's leadership. The Comintern did give its approval to the other provisions of the Wayaobu Manifesto, agreeing that neither the power of the Chinese soviets nor the independence of the Chinese Red Army should be sacrificed. But they absolutely vetoed the CCP's plan to form a base in the northwest, arguing that such a move would scuttle the chance for a united front with the Nationalists. After recovering from their shock at what appeared to them to be a sudden change in policy, CCP accepted the new directive from the Comintern. They adopted the new slogan "compelling Chiang to resist Japan", and CCP secret agent Pan Hannian was sent to Nanjing to begin negotiating a truce with one of Chiang's close advisors, Chen Lifu.

Map of eastern China in December 1936: Held by the Chinese Communist Party Held by the central Nationalist Government Semi-autonomous areas aligned with the Nationalist Government Held by the Northeastern Army, Northwestern Army, or allies Held by the Empire of Japan

By the time Pan and Chen met, however, Chiang Kai-shek had regained confidence in his ability to end the civil war by military means. In September 1936, he had successfully resolved the Liangguang Incident. (Note: The Liangguang Incident was a revolt by the Guangxi Clique that governed Guangxi and Guangdong (Liangguang) provinces. Chiang had been putting pressure on them to accept the authority of the central government, and the Guangxi Clique leaders had responded by criticizing Chiang's inaction against Japan. In June, they declared that they were sending an army north to fight the Japanese, leading to conflict with the central government's National Revolutionary Army. The country seemed to be on the brink of civil war until press reports revealed that the Guangxi Clique had received Japanese support for their revolt. Public opinion turned sharply against them and the revolt crumbled.) In mid-to-late October, the Nationalist-allied Hui cavalry had intercepted a Communist resupply mission and cut the Second and Fourth Corps of the Red Army to pieces. (Note: This event is known as the Ningxia Campaign.) Thus, the terms that Chen Lifu presented to Pan Hannian in early November were extremely harsh. They called for, among other things, reducing the Red Army to 3,000 men and sending all of its senior officers into exile. Pan balked, calling them "conditions for surrender".

Chiang had always considered a military victory to be preferable to a negotiated settlement, and he pressed ahead with preparations for a sixth encirclement campaign. But he faced pressure from his generals to consider leading a united front. During Chiang's birthday celebrations on 31 October, Zhang Xueliang attempted to convince Chiang to give up the bandit suppression campaign and focus on Japan instead. Zhang was supported by Yan Xishan and Feng Yuxiang, but Chiang angrily refused. He gave a speech the following day where he proclaimed that "the Communists are our greatest traitors". When Zhang returned to Xi'an and recounted the incident to Yang Hucheng, the latter suggested reviving the ancient idea of a bingjian (Chinese: 兵谏; pinyin: bīngjiàn; trans. "military remonstrance"). In an episode in Chinese history, a military officer had arrested the Emperor to force him to change a bad policy. The officer had been rewarded for his conduct rather than punished. Zhang, who historian Alexander Pantsov calls a "gallant cavalier", was intrigued by the nobility of the idea.

In late November, Chiang ordered the Northeastern Army and forces from the central Nationalist Army, Hu Zongnan's Right Route Army, to attack towards the Communist capital at Bao'an. At the resulting Battle of Shanchengbao, the Northeastern Army withheld most of its forces from the attack. This allowed the Red Army to ambush and nearly wipe out Hu's 78th regiment. After the battle, Chen Lifu presented Pan Hannian with more moderate conditions for a deal. But by then the CCP had lost faith in the negotiations and on 10 December recalled Pan from Nanjing.

The relationship between Zhang and Chiang only continued to deteriorate after the defeat at Shanchengbao. On 23 November, Chiang ordered the arrest of seven leaders of the National Salvation Association, and organization of leading intellectuals who wanted China to confront Japan. The move was broadly unpopular in China, and Zhang flew to Luoyang on 3 December and tried to convince Chiang to reverse his decision. He also repeated his pitch for Chiang to lead a united anti-Japanese front. Chiang responded with outrage: "You are the only one in the whole country who sees things as you do. I am the revolutionary government; what I do is revolution!" When news arrived that day that Japanese marines had landed at Qingdao under the pretext of suppressing anti-Japanese agitation there, Chiang decided to redouble his efforts to defeat the Communists—disgusting Zhang.

=== Zhang's feud with Chi Shih-ying ===
According to Chi Shih-ying, after the KMT's defeat in the Chinese Civil War, Chiang Kai-shek privately attributed part of the loss to Chi and the CC Clique for having "driven Zhang into rebellion." As the clique's principal figure in Manchurian affairs, Chi's feud with Zhang dated to the Guo Songling revolt against Zhang Zuolin in 1925. Chi, who had studied in Germany on a scholarship from Zhang Zuolin and later served in Guo's forces, proposed taking Zhang Xueliang hostage during the latter's mission to negotiate with Guo, a suggestion that permanently soured relations despite being rejected. After Guo's defeat, Chi fled to Nanjing via the Japanese consulate in Xinmin, whose consul was the future Japanese prime minister Yoshida Shigeru, before joining Chiang's government and rising within the CC Clique's party apparatus to become one of Zhang's principal political rivals during the Nanjing decade.

According to Chi, after accompanying Chiang back to Nanjing on 27 December 1936, Zhang explained to He Yingqin that the mutiny had stemmed "half from others' influence," by which Zhang meant the CCP, "and grievances account for the other half. The Nationalist government awarded decorations to everyone but me. When I bought three cars, customs refused to waive the duties. They looked down on my name. And that Chi fellow has been working against me in Nanjing time and again, while the central government never intervened. They trust him more than they trust me." In later years, Chi claimed to have regretted his adversarial relationship with Zhang, and believed that a reconciliation between them might have altered the course of Chinese history.

== Chiang's arrest ==
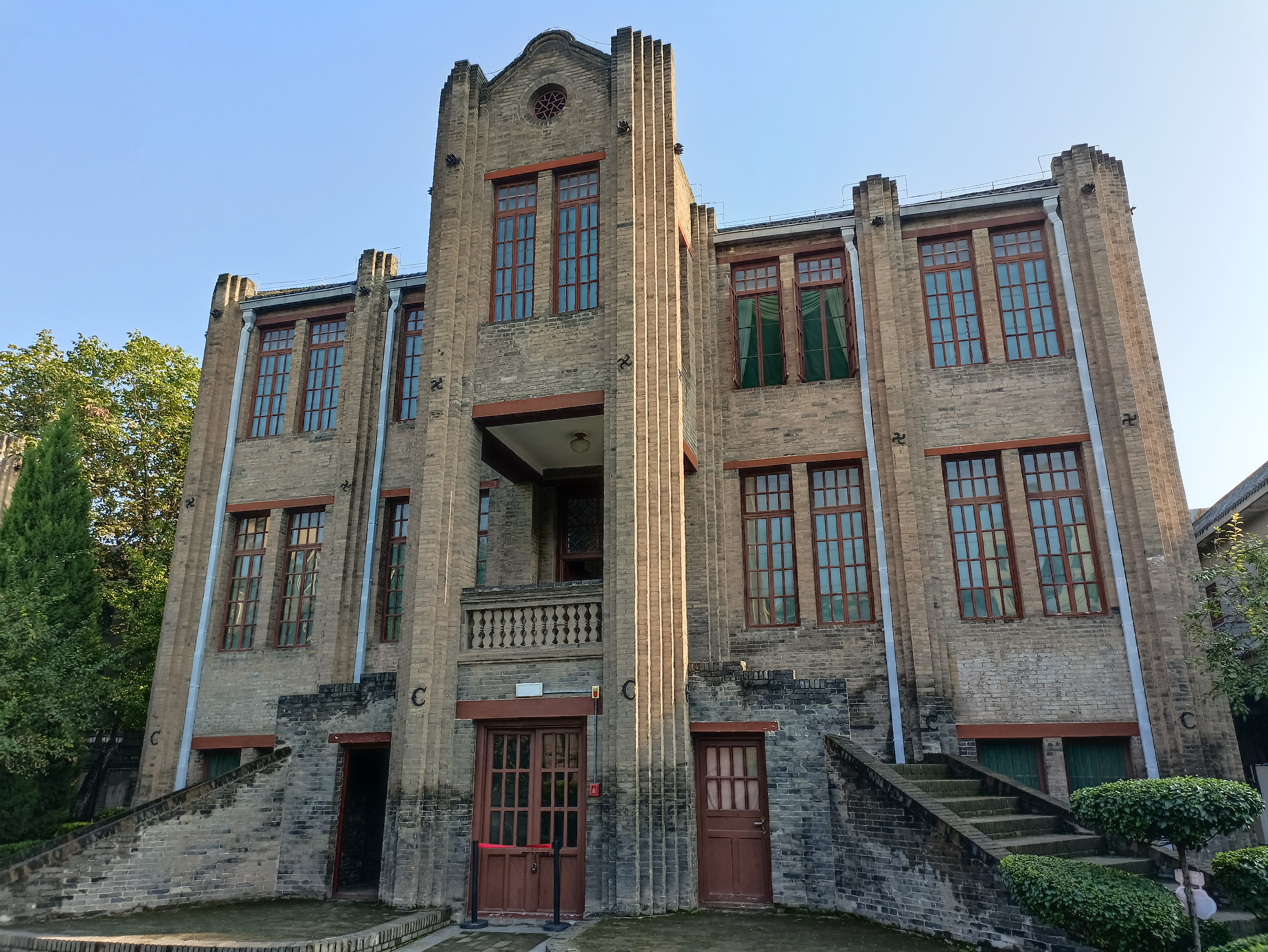
Zhang's residence in Xi'an, where he made the decision to arrest Chiang.

Chiang and his entourage drove from Luoyang to Xi'an on 4 December 1936, in order to make preparations for another assault on the Communists. By this time he was aware through intelligence reports that Zhang had been collaborating with the Communists, but he did not realize that he was in any actual danger. Chiang believed that he could convince Zhang to join his sixth encirclement campaign in earnest. He stayed at the Huaqing Pool complex, an ancient resort located in the town of Lintong, about 10 miles outside Xi'an. Chiang's associates were staying in the city of Xi'an itself, in the newly built Western Capital Hotel. Zhang, Yang, and Chiang met to discuss policy but once again reached an impasse. Chiang shouted at Zhang that "I am the Generalissimo; I do not err; I am China; and China cannot do well without me!" On 9 December, Chiang threatened Zhang and Yang that if they did not attack the Communists, he would remove them from command and have their forces reassigned to distant southern provinces. Historian Rana Mitter suggests that the risk of losing his command may have been the final straw that confirmed Zhang's intention to launch a coup. The meeting was interrupted by the arrival in Lintong of tens of thousands of students demonstrating for a united front. (Note: Estimates of the size of the crowd vary. Yang gives it at 20,000, Pantsov says over 10,000.) Chiang demanded that Zhang disperse the crowd or he would have his guards open fire on them. Zhang promised the students "a definite reply in action within one week."

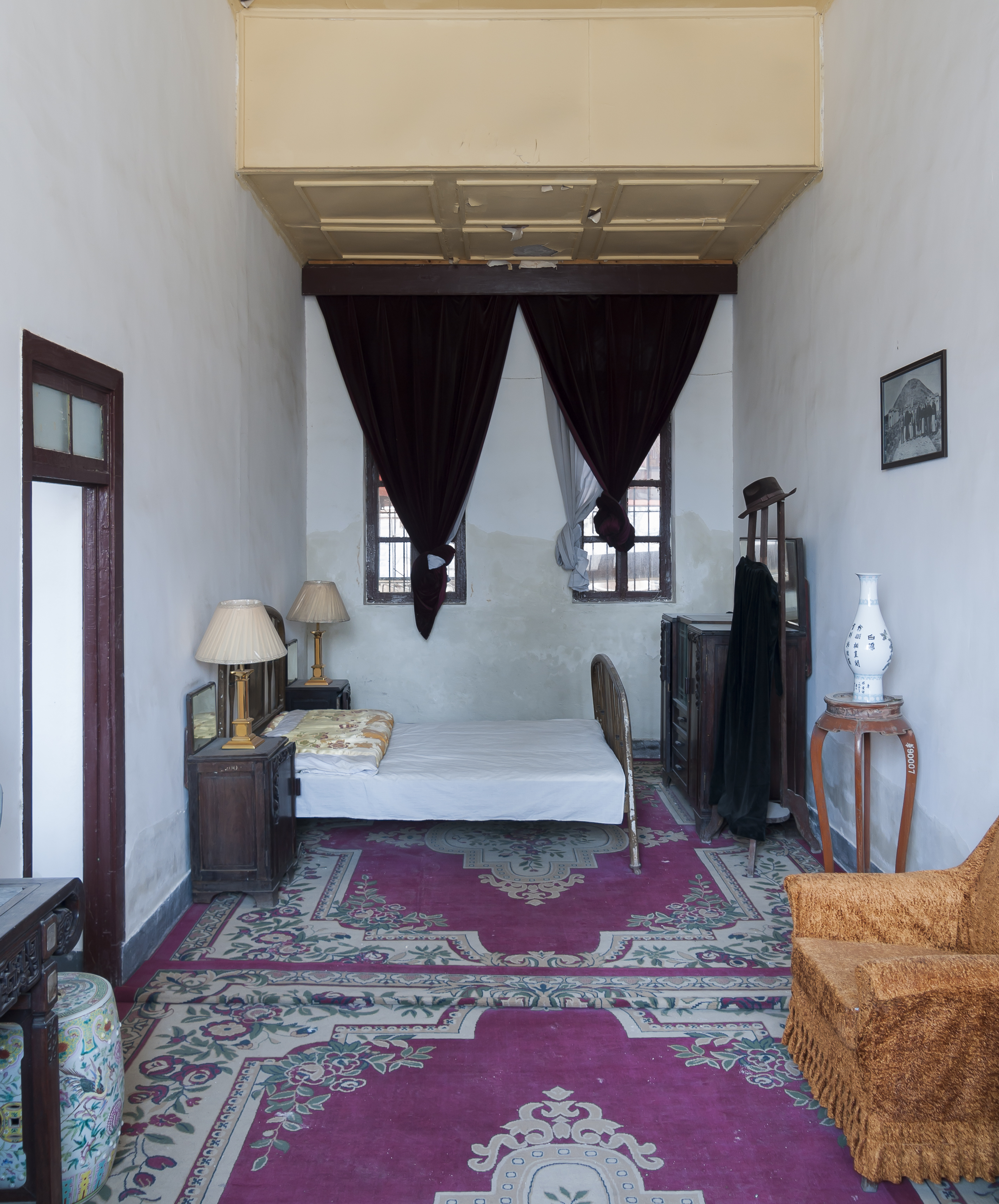
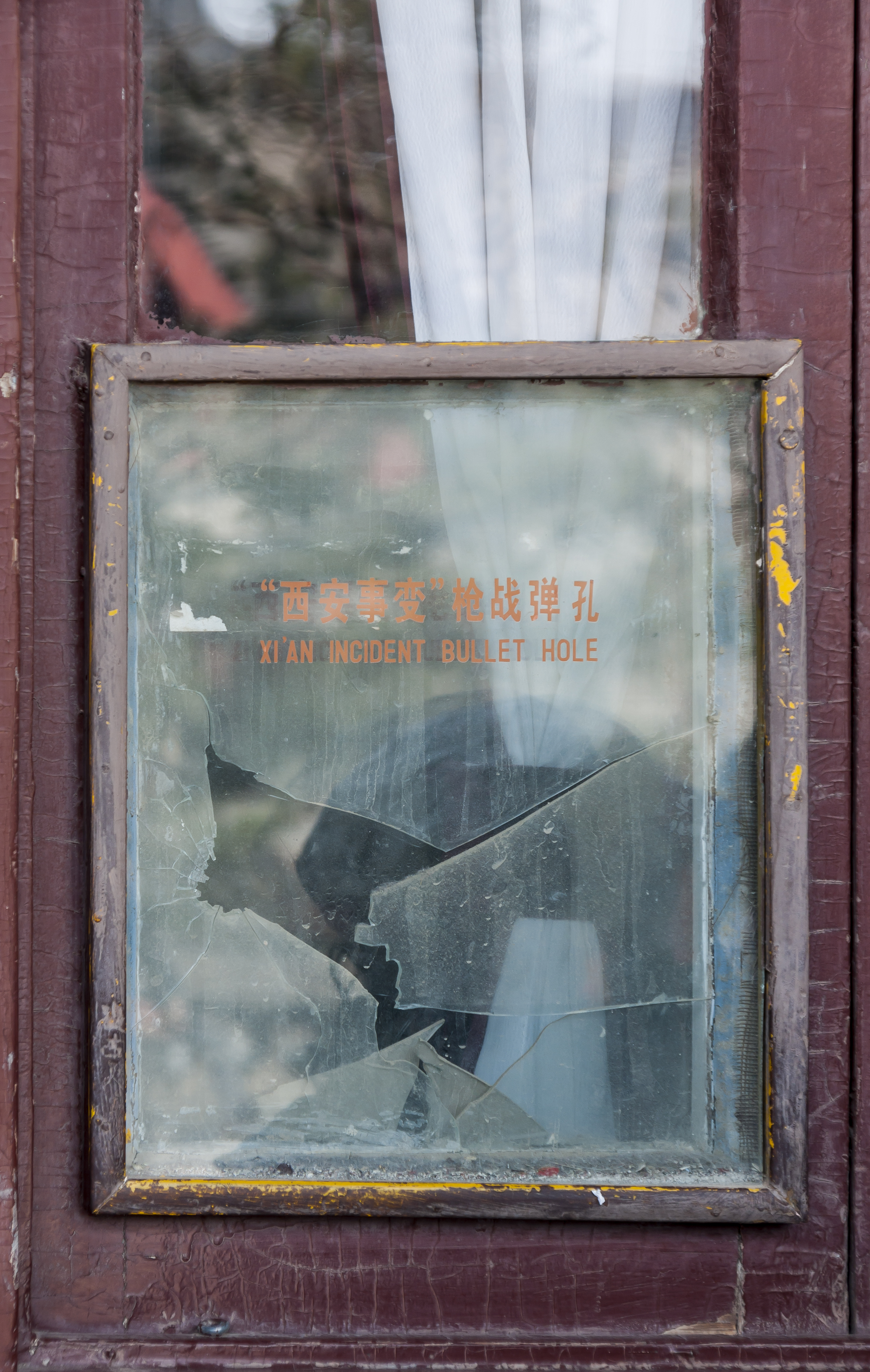
The room where Chiang Kai-shek stayed in the Wujianting (五間廳, 'five-room pavilion'), part of the Huaqing Pool complex, and a bullet hole left by the firefight.

Chiang was scheduled to leave on 12 December. At 10 PM on Friday, 11 December Zhang Xueliang ordered Sun Mingjiu (孫銘九), the captain of his personal guard, to arrest Chiang Kai-shek. According to Sun's later account, his orders were to bring Chiang to Xi'an unharmed. As Sun prepared, Zhang gathered the top officers of the Northeastern and Northwestern Armies to inform them of his decision. He also sent a telegram to the CCP Central Committee. (Note: Contrary to a common misconception, the CCP did not have prior knowledge of the conspiracy.) At 5 AM, 12 December, Sun Mingjiu led a few hundred soldiers on an assault of the Huaqing Pool complex. They reached the gate at 6 AM, where they were asked for the password. Unable to give it, they began a firefight with Chiang's guards. This alerted Chiang to the attack, and in panic he fled out of his window. He jumped over the wall surrounding the compound, injuring his back in the process. Without his false teeth or one of his shoes, he fled up the side of a snow-covered mountain. He was discovered a few hours later, shivering and exhausted. Sun carried Chiang down the mountain on his back. Chiang was brought to Yang Hucheng's headquarters in Xi'an, where Zhang explained that he had kidnapped him in order to force him to change his policies. Chiang was indignant, and after an initial exchange, he refused to speak.

Beginning at 5:30 AM that same day, Yang's Northwestern Army seized important locations around Xi'an: the government headquarters, the airport, the police station, and the Western Capital Hotel where Chiang's associates were staying. Those taken prisoner included governor of Shaanxi Shao Lizi, the Shaanxi commissioner of education Zhou Xuechang, and Generals Chen Cheng, Jiang Dingwen, Wei Lihuang, and Zhu Shaoliang. Shao Yuanchong, one of the authors of the National Anthem of the Republic of China, was shot while trying to escape from the hotel. He died in the hospital two days later. The Northwestern Army had poor discipline, and carried out widespread looting for three days after the coup. Only the areas controlled by Zhang's Northeastern Army were unaffected.

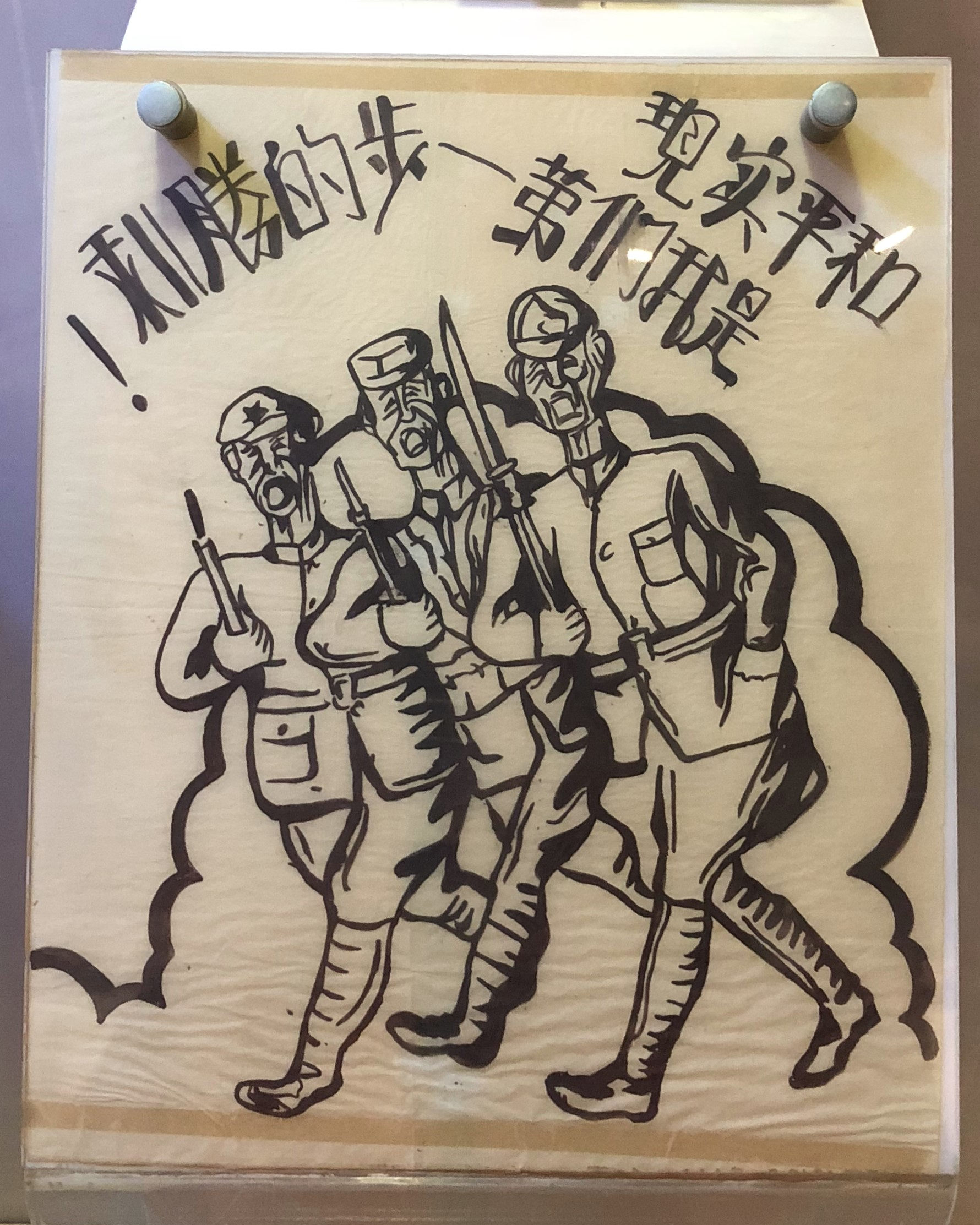
A propaganda poster posted in Xi'an during the Xi'an Incident. It reads: "The realization of peace is our first step towards victory!"

Zhang and Yang attempted to secure their strategic situation. Soon after Chiang was captured, Zhang sent telegrams to the Northeastern Army's 51st Army in Lanzhou and to the commander of some artillery brigades he had stationed in Luoyang. While the 51st Army took control of Lanzhou by that afternoon, the commander in Luoyang instead handed Zhang's telegram to the Nationalist garrison commander, Zhu Shaozhou. Zhu reacted quickly. He informed Minister of War He Yingqin, who ordered a loyal division to occupy Tong Pass, a critical chokepoint on the route from east from Xi'an. They arrived only four hours before Feng Qinzai's 42nd Division, sent by Yang Hucheng for the same purpose. Zhu also attempted an aerial mission to rescue Chiang, but it took until 10 am to arrive and the pilot was taken prisoner.

Early on the morning of 12 December, Zhang and Yang sent telegrams to Nanjing and all across China, explaining what they had done and listed eight demands for the Nanjing government in order to allow Chiang to remain as leader should they accepted:

1. To reorganize the Nanjing government so that all political parties and groups can take part in it and assume responsibility for national salvation;
2. To suspend the civil war all over the country and adopt a policy for united anti-Japanese resistance;
3. To immediately release the [Seven] National Salvation Intellectual Leaders who were arrested in Shanghai;
4. To release all the political prisoners in China;
5. To liberate people's patriotic movements;
6. To guarantee all the political freedoms and rights of the people, as well as the freedom of assembly and association;
7. To ensure compliance with the will of Sun Yat-sen; and
8. To immediately convene a national salvation congress.

— Declaration of Eight-Point Demands

== Immediate reactions ==
News spread overnight through Bao'an, the CCP capital. Mao Zedong and the other Central Committee members were surprised but elated. A mass meeting held the following morning approved a proposal by Mao to put Chiang on trial as a traitor. Zhou Enlai was dispatched to Xi'an. The CCP advised Zhang to prepare for attacks by the Nationalist central government, and promised that the Red Army would not take advantage of the situation to occupy any Northeastern Army territory. They also notified the Comintern of what had occurred and asked permission to form a "revolutionary government of national defense" with Zhang, Yang, and other dissident Nationalists. A meeting of the CCP Central Committee was held on 13 December to discuss the situation in more detail. The vast majority approved the plan to force Chiang to step down and stand trial, and to sentence him to death. Zhang Guotao even called for the overthrow of the nationalist government. Mao declared Chiang as "objectively pro-Japanese" and that his arrest had "revolutionary significance" in which the Party should support, but cautioned against taking the lead to oppose Chiang and instead favor Chiang to be brought under the "people's verdict" in order to encourage Zhang Xueliang to execute the Generalissimo while keeping the Party's hands clean. They also hoped to make Xi'an the center of a government of national resistance to Japan. On 15 December, the CCP sent a telegram to Nanjing urging them to comply with the Eight Demands, force Chiang to step down, and allow him to be tried.

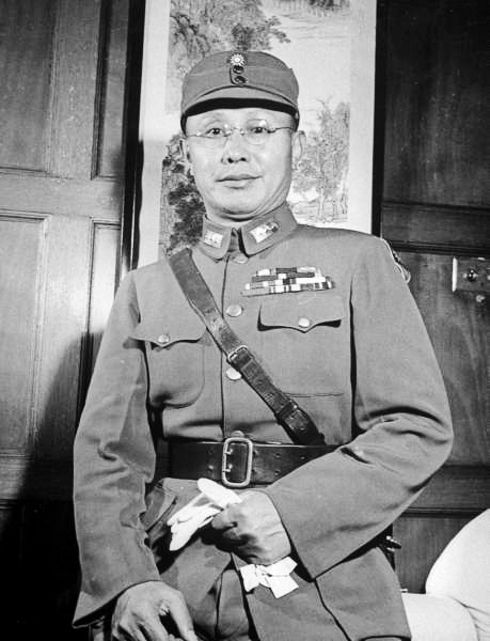
He Yingqin, Minister of War

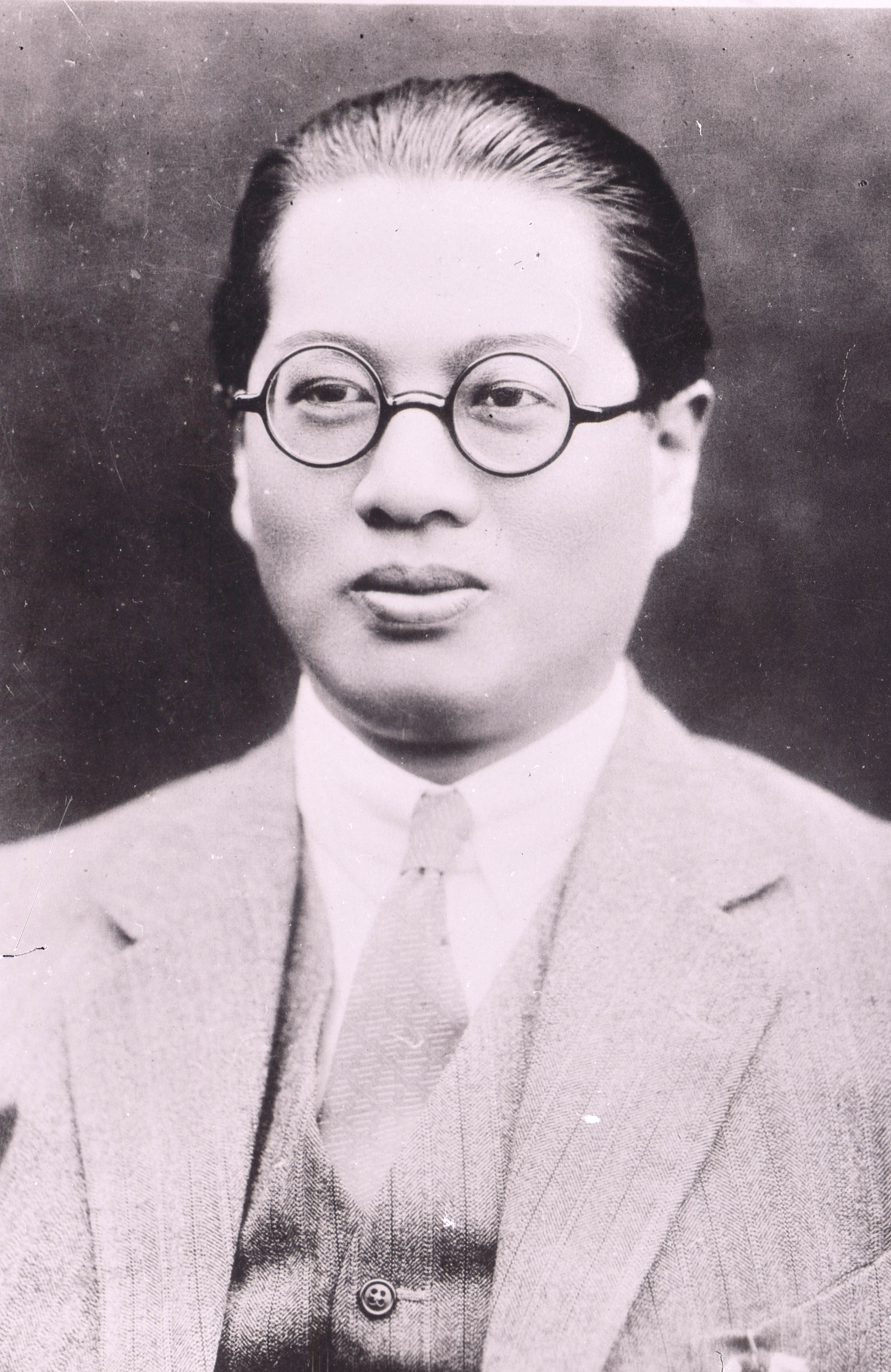
T. V. Soong, Chiang's brother-in-law

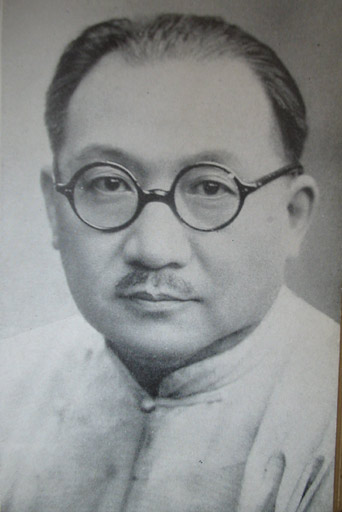
H. H. Kung, Vice-President of the Executive Yuan

Three leading figures in the Nationalist Government

Nanjing received word of Chiang's arrest by 1 pm on 12 December. (Note: He Yingqin had learned of the revolt earlier, via Zhu Shaozhou.) An emergency meeting of the Central Standing Committee was convened that night. The committee members were uncertain over whether Chiang was dead or alive. He Yingqin argued for an immediate military attack on Xi'an, possibly because he believed that Chiang was already dead. The Committee made no firm decision on what to do, other than placing He Yingqin in charge of the military response. The following day, H.H. Kung and Soong Mei-ling arrived in the capital and began campaigning hard for a negotiated settlement. They had received a personal telegram from Zhang assuring them that Chiang was alive, and as the Generalissmo's relatives, they feared that they would lose their influence if he were killed in an attack. Soong Mei-ling even suggested that Zhang Xueliang's demands were worth hearing out. In contrast, the mood in the army was sanguine. Hundreds of officers signed a letter to He Yingqin requesting permission to attack Xi'an. Hundreds more sent a threatening telegram to Zhang demanding that he stand down. In the end, He decided to surround and attempt to intimidate the mutineers rather than attack or negotiate right away. On 16 December, he received a mandate from the Central Standing Committee to begin a punitive expedition. The Central Army took up positions surrounding Xi'an. The Nationalist government unsuccessfully attempted to induce defections from the mutinous armies and pressure Zhang to surrender. Bombing raids were conducted on Weinan and Huaxian and the Training Division of the Central Army launched an unsanctioned attack that ended in defeat.

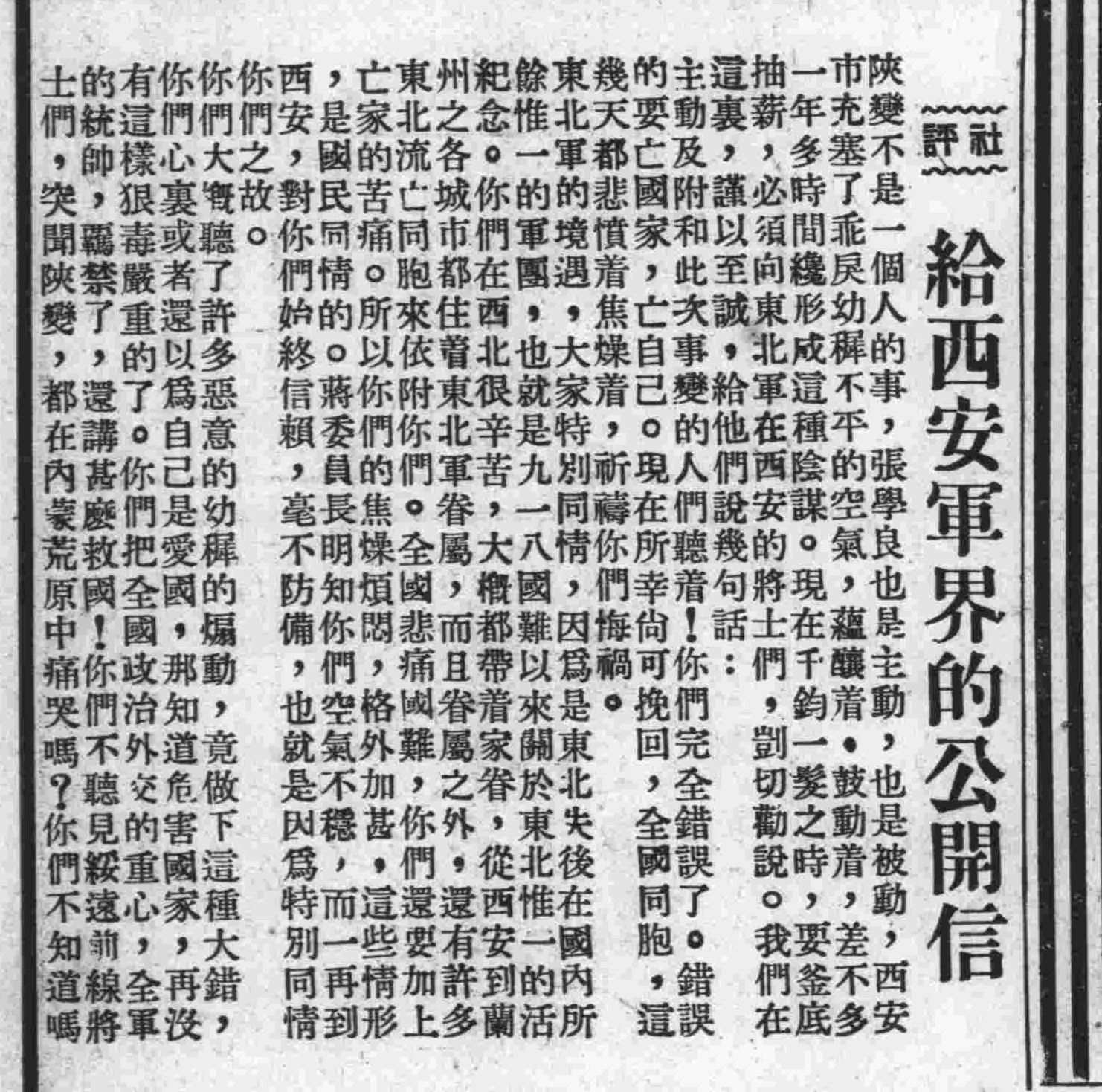
The 18 December editorial "An Open Letter to the Military Vocation in Xi'an" published in Ta Kung Pao. Critical of the coup, the newspaper dropped their editorial by plane into Xi'an.

Most warlords chose to stay neutral in the conflict rather than risk backing the losing side. Many, such as Liu Xiang of Sichuan, Han Fuju of Shandong, and Song Zheyuan of Hebei, were privately sympathetic to the coup. They publicly reassured the central government of their loyalty while voicing support for a negotiated settlement. Zhang Xueliang had counted on the support of Yan Xishan, the governor of Shanxi who had also signed a secret deal with the CCP. But Yan was afraid that a civil war would break out between Xi'an and Nanjing. He urged Zhang to let Chiang go, although simultaneously expressing his desire for Chinese unity against Japan and converting his anti-Communist militias into anti-Japanese militias. Only one warlord faction, the Guangxi Clique in the southwest, openly supported the rebels. They had recently led their own rebellion against the central government and shared Zhang and Yang's desire for a common front against Japan.

The Chinese public reacted with shock at the news of Chiang's arrest. There was widespread concern for Chiang's safety. Ta Kung Pao, a major newspaper, published an editorial excoriating Zhang and calling for Chiang's immediate release. Even members of the National Salvation Association, who also wanted a ceasefire with the Communists and war against Japan, feared that Chiang's captivity could give Japan an opening to conquer China. Groups across the political spectrum advocated for Chiang's release. Chinese students were an exception to this uniformity of public opinion. In North China they strongly supported the coup, while in South China there was a divide between left-wing students, who largely supported the coup, and right-wing students, who largely opposed it.

New Zealand journalist James Bertram, who managed to enter Xi'an shortly after the incident began, reported on the mood of the city. He observed fleets of government aircraft flying low over the roofs, and heard H. H. Kung's declaration over radio that there would be "no dealings with armed rebellion, no truce with the 'Communist bandits'." The city's population remained strongly supportive of the rebels and their cause.

=== Stalin's intervention and CCP reversal ===
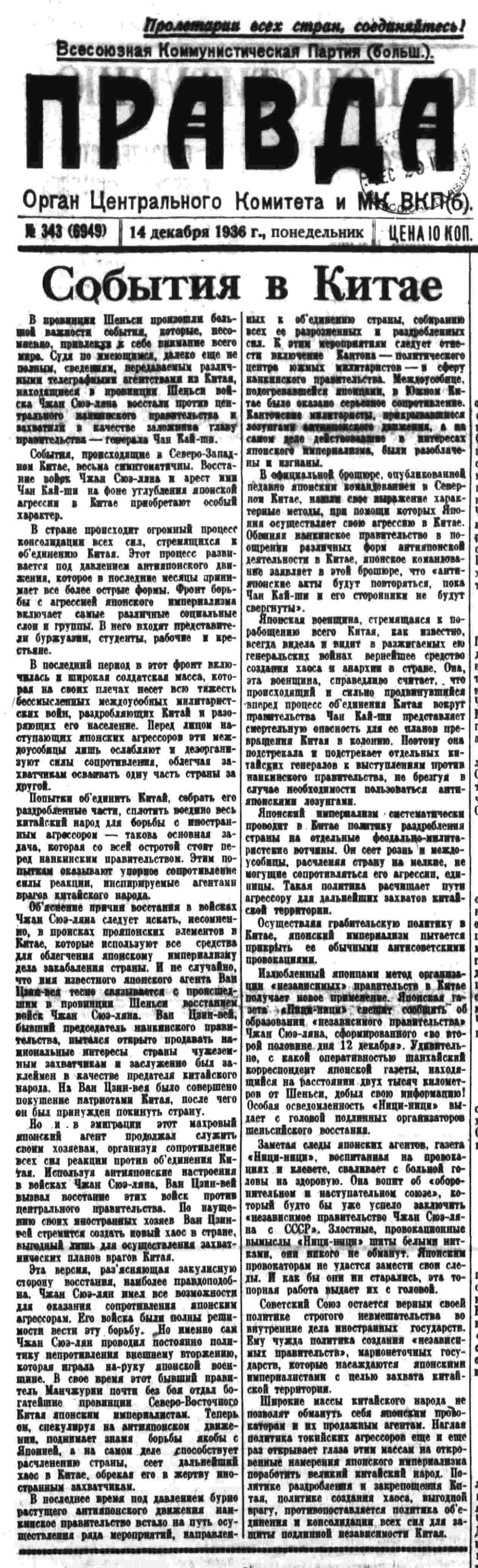
The 14 December article in Pravda "Events in China" condemned the coup as a Japanese plot

Moscow received news of Chiang's arrest on 13 December. The head of the Comintern, Georgi Dimitrov, was delighted and was preparing to authorize Chiang's execution until he read the articles in Pravda and Izvestia that condemned the Xi'an Incident as a plot by "pro-Japanese elements". In a subsequent meeting, Joseph Stalin made it clear to Dimitrov that he viewed Chiang as indispensable.

Stalin had a number of reasons for opposing the mutiny. Unlike the CCP's leadership, which tended to view Chiang as the primary obstacle to a renewed united front, Stalin feared that executing or holding Chiang captive would make the Nationalists more likely to align or fall to Japan. Pan Hannian had advised him that without Chiang, "China would be without a leader to fight the Japanese and this would not benefit the Soviet Union." Chiang's most likely successor was ex-Premier Wang Jingwei. Not only was Wang absent from China in December 1936, (Note: Wang Jingwei was in Europe convalescing from an assassination attempt the previous year. He Yingqin notified him when Chiang was abducted, but he did not arrive back in China until 14 January 1937, after the incident was already over.) he had just met with Adolf Hitler to discuss the prospect of China joining the Anti-Comintern Pact. Stalin also distrusted Zhang Xueliang's intentions. His father, Zhang Zuolin, had been a close ally of the Japanese, and Zhang himself had led Chinese forces against the Soviet Union during the 1929 Sino-Soviet conflict. Only a few months before Xi'an, press investigations had revealed that a similar revolt by Chinese generals opposed to Chiang's appeasement policies (the Liangguang Incident) was covertly supported by the Japanese in order to weaken China. Furthermore, in November 1936, the Soviets made new attempts to enrol the Nationalists as an ally in order to counter the Anti-Comintern Pact and secret talks were underway on a Sino-Soviet security treaty, which could all put into doubt with Chiang's arrest. By his opposition to Chiang's arrest, Stalin effectively ignored the interests of the CCP.

The Comintern therefore sent a telegram on 16 December instructing the CCP to bring the Xi'an incident to a peaceful conclusion. The telegram was not received until the 17th, and would not be fully decrypted for several days. However, by that point the CCP's leadership had already learned of Moscow's stance from public news sources and decided to change course. On the 17th, the CCP announced that they desired a peaceful settlement. On 18 December, they recanted their former call for a public trial of Chiang as "inappropriate". Mao was reportedly furious at Moscow's intervention and being dictated by the Soviet leader, to which Mao would never forgot that Soviet "internationalism" was a one-way street.

== Negotiations ==
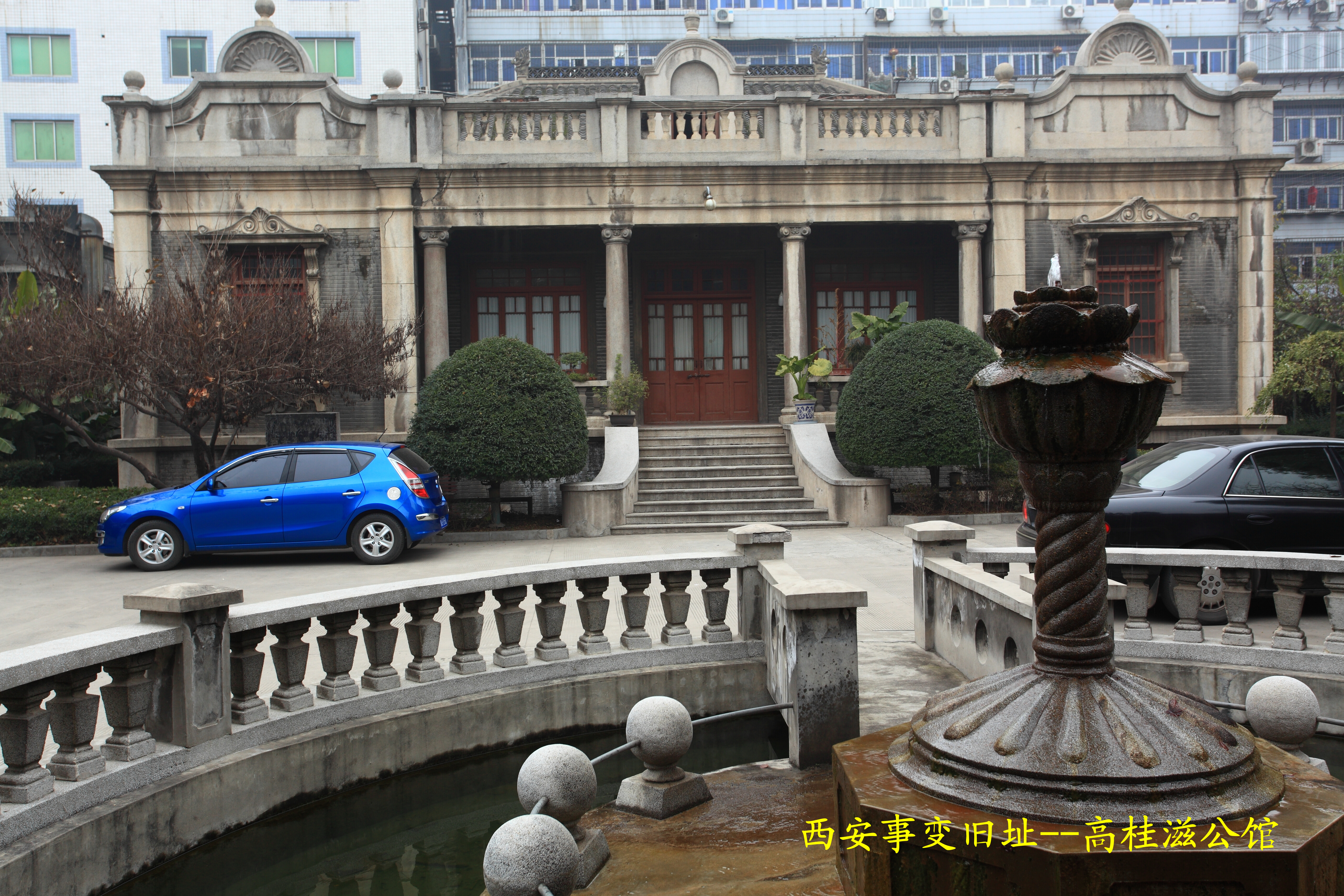
Gao Guizi's residence, the building where Chiang was held from 14 December until his release

The Xi'an mutineers never expected Chiang to agree to all eight of their demands, but Zhang made it clear to Chiang that he would have to accept some of them before he would be released. Chiang at first refused to talk. The situation improved when William Donald arrived on 14 December. Donald knew both men, as he had been a former advisor to Zhang and was a current advisor to Chiang. He convinced Chiang to accept the offer of better lodgings at the house of Gao Guizi. He also predicted to the leaders of the mutiny that holding Chiang hostage would ultimately undermine their cause in the eyes of the Chinese public.

Zhou Enlai, who had departed Bao'an on 15 December, arrived in Xi'an late on the 17th in the middle of an extremely delicate situation. A faction of the army led by Yang Hucheng and the radical young officers of the "Anti-Japanese Comrade Society" wanted to execute Chiang, in line with the CCP's earlier pronouncements. But Zhang was gravely concerned with the Central Government's military response, the lukewarm support he had received from fellow warlords, and the unexpected opposition of the Chinese public. He wanted to negotiate Chiang's release, and was anxious to know if Moscow was going to be providing the material support for an anti-Japanese war that he had counted on. Zhou, aware at this point that Moscow had condemned the coup, had to carefully walk back the CCP's radical stance and break the bad news to Zhang without jeopardizing the northwest alliance. The meeting between Zhou and the Xi'an leaders lasted all night. Eventually, Zhou managed to convince them that they should negotiate for Chiang's safe release, so long as the Central Government did not start a civil war. Yet he also emphasized that Chiang was still extremely powerful, and so they also agreed that Chiang would not be let go unless he accepted some minimal conditions.

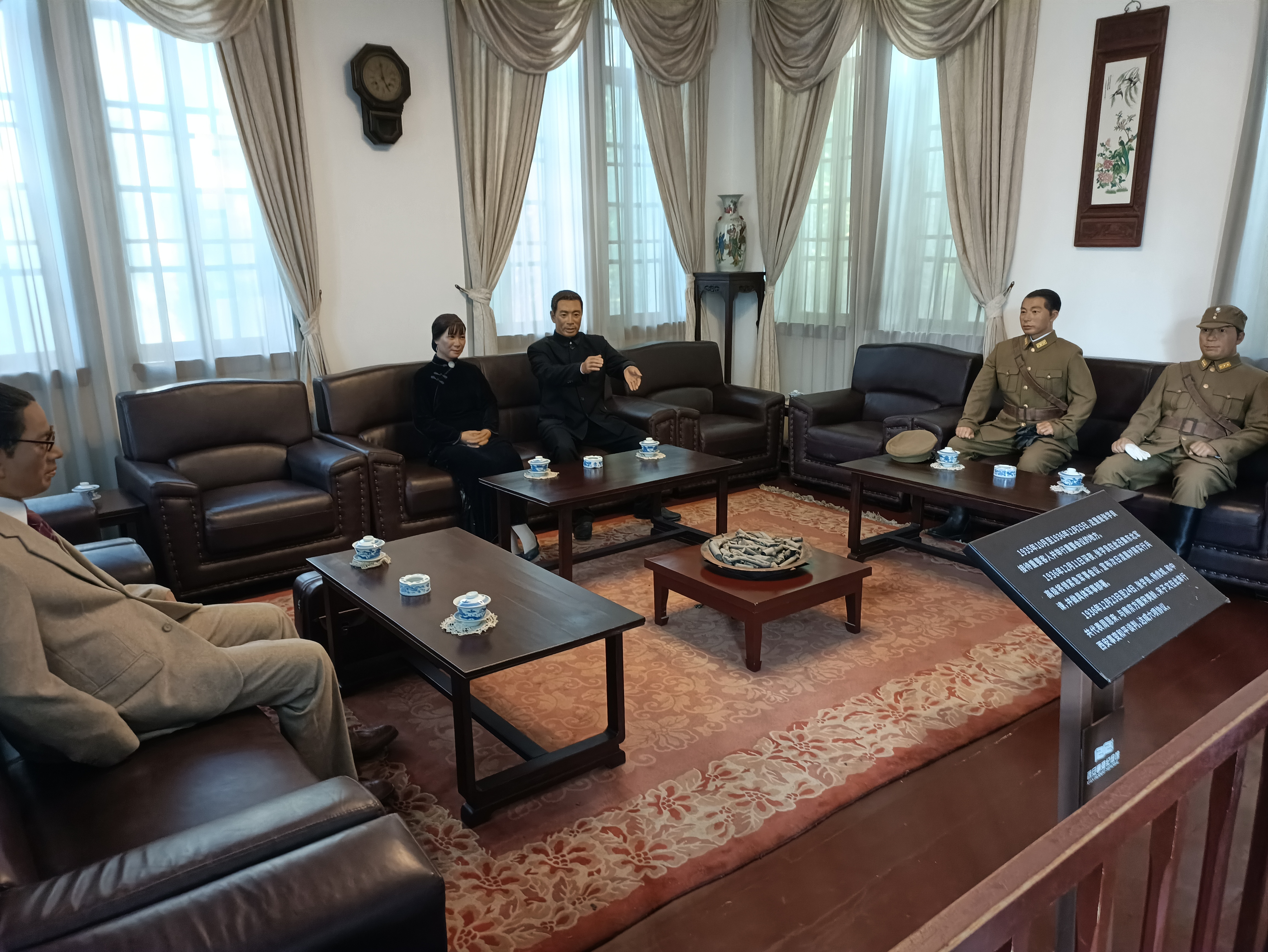
The room in Zhang Xueliang's residence where negotiations were held on 23 and 24 December, featuring a recreation of that scene. From left to right: T. V. Soong, Soong Mei-ling, Zhou Enlai, Zhang Xueliang, and Yang Hucheng.

T. V. Soong, Chiang's brother-in-law and leading Chinese banker, decided to fly to Xi'an after learning that Chiang was still alive. He arrived on 20 December. Zhang told him that he was ready to negotiate, but warned that he would turn Chiang over to the Communists if the Central Government launched a full-scale attack. Soong and Donald could not convince Chiang to negotiate and returned to Nanjing on 21 December. The following day, they returned with Soong Mei-ling and Dai Li, the head of the Nationalists' military intelligence. Finally, his wife was able to persuade Chiang to negotiate. He refused to sign any document, but verbally agreed to "reshuffle the government, hold a national salvation conference three months from now, reorganize the Kuomintang, and approve an alliance with Russia and cooperation with the Communist party." He also authorized T. V. Soong to conduct further negotiations with his captors. On 23–24 December, negotiations were held between Zhou, T. V. Soong, Soong Mei-ling, Zhang, and Yang that resulted in a more concrete agreement (although still not signed by Chiang). The civil war would be ended, the Communist party legalized, and the Red Army incorporated as a unit of the National Revolutionary Army.

On 24 December, Chiang received Zhou for a meeting, the first time the two had seen each other since Zhou had left Whampoa Military Academy over ten years earlier. Zhou began the conversation by saying: "In the ten years since we have met, you seem to have aged very little." Chiang nodded and said: "Enlai, you were my subordinate. You should do what I say." Zhou replied that if Chiang would halt the civil war and resist the Japanese instead, the Red Army would willingly accept Chiang's command. Chiang then agreed to accept the terms finalized earlier that day. He also promised to continue negotiations with Zhou about the details of a new united front once he was allowed to return to Nanjing.

When Yang Hucheng and the other senior army officers learned that Zhang Xueliang was pressing ahead with a negotiated release, they were dismayed and demanded that Chiang sign written guarantees. The officers wrote a letter to T.V. Soong to that effect. Chiang became desperate to be released, and Soong Mei-ling begged Zhang to let him go. Zhang, convinced of the danger to Chiang's safety, agreed to accompany Chiang and Soong Mei-ling back to Nanjing. He did not inform Zhou, who exclaimed "This is bad! Bad!" when he learned that Chiang was leaving before he had signed a formal agreement. Zhang, Soong, and Chiang took off around 5 pm on 25 December, arriving in Nanjing the following day. Zhou telegraphed party headquarters, settling on the view that while "it is regrettable that Chiang was allowed to leave and Zhang went with him", Chiang had seemed to have made a genuine change in his attitude.

== Aftermath ==
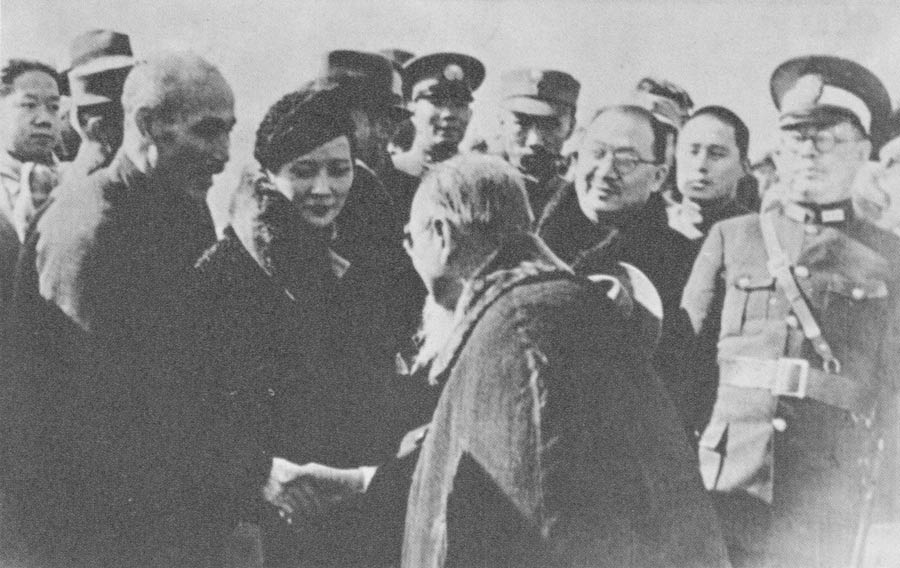
Lin Sen receives Chiang Kai-shek at the Nanjing Airport after the Xi'an Incident.

When Chiang arrived in Nanjing he was greeted by cheering crowds of over 400,000 people. The American journalist Edgar Snow declared that Chiang had returned with a national standing "higher than that of any leader in modern Chinese history." The Generalissimo made a show of taking responsibility for the insubordination of his commanders, repeatedly attempting to resign all of his posts. But he was refused each time, and the event served to further consolidate power within the Nationalist government into Chiang's hands. Historian Jay Taylor writes how Xi'an turned Chiang from a "popular leader" into a "national hero". American ambassador Nelson T. Johnson wrote how "Whereas the outstanding developments during the first half of 1936 increased the precariousness of China's position, the significant events of the second half, in their larger aspects, have had the opposite effect." He observed that the Xi'an crisis "fostered another spontaneous outburst of nationalism throughout the country and caused universal rejoicing when the Generalissimo was released on Christmas Day."

Chiang moved swiftly to punish the conspirators. Zhang was arrested upon his arrival in Nanjing and brought before a court-martial on charges of treason on 31 December. He was sentenced to ten years in prison, which Chiang commuted to house arrest. Zhang would remain under house arrest (even brought to Taiwan in 1949) for over 50 years until 1990, after the deaths of both Chiang Kai-shek and Chiang Ching-kuo. Chiang sent 37 army divisions north to surround the Northeastern Army and force them to stand down. The army was deeply divided on the appropriate response. The Communist representatives cautioned that civil war would, in the words of Zhou Enlai, "make China into another Spain". A conference of Northeastern officers in January overwhelmingly resolved not to surrender peacefully, and the CCP reluctantly pledged to fight alongside them if the Nationalists attacked. However, the five most senior Northeastern generals, led by Wang Yizhe, met separately and decided to surrender. This enraged the radical officers in the Anti-Japanese Comrade Society, who assassinated Wang Yizhe on 2 February. They confronted Zhou Enlai as well, threatening to kill him in retribution for his "betrayal" of Zhang Xueliang. Zhou managed to convince them to stand down.

Nonetheless, the northwestern alliance had been fatally damaged and subsequently disintegrated. Wang Yizhe's assassination had turned the majority of the army against the radicals. The Northeastern Army peacefully surrendered to General Gu Zhutong in February. The leaders of the Anti-Japanese Comrade Society, fearing punishment at the hands of the Nationalists, largely defected to the Red Army. The rest of the army was divided into new units, which were sent to Hebei, Hunan, and Anhui. Yang Hucheng was forced into exile, but voluntarily returned to China in November 1937. He was immediately arrested and would be executed in September 1949.

Meanwhile, the CCP under Mao was pressured by the Soviets to "openly proclaim and resolutely carry out" a policy of enhanced cooperation with the Nationalists, to which Mao ignored Moscow's demands.

=== The Second United Front ===
The Xi'an Incident launched a long series of negotiations led by Zhou Enlai and Chiang Kai-shek. The sticking points remained what they had been before the crisis: the independence of the Red Army and the political structure of the Communist base areas. No resolution was reached, but the negotiations continued through spring. Publicly, the Nationalist government insisted that its policy towards the Communists had not changed. But a ceasefire was enacted and "Bandit Suppression Headquarters" was dropped from the name of the NRA's northwest command. It was not until late September 1937, several months after the Second Sino-Japanese War had already begun, that the final pieces of the Second United Front were formally agreed upon and enacted.

== Legacy ==
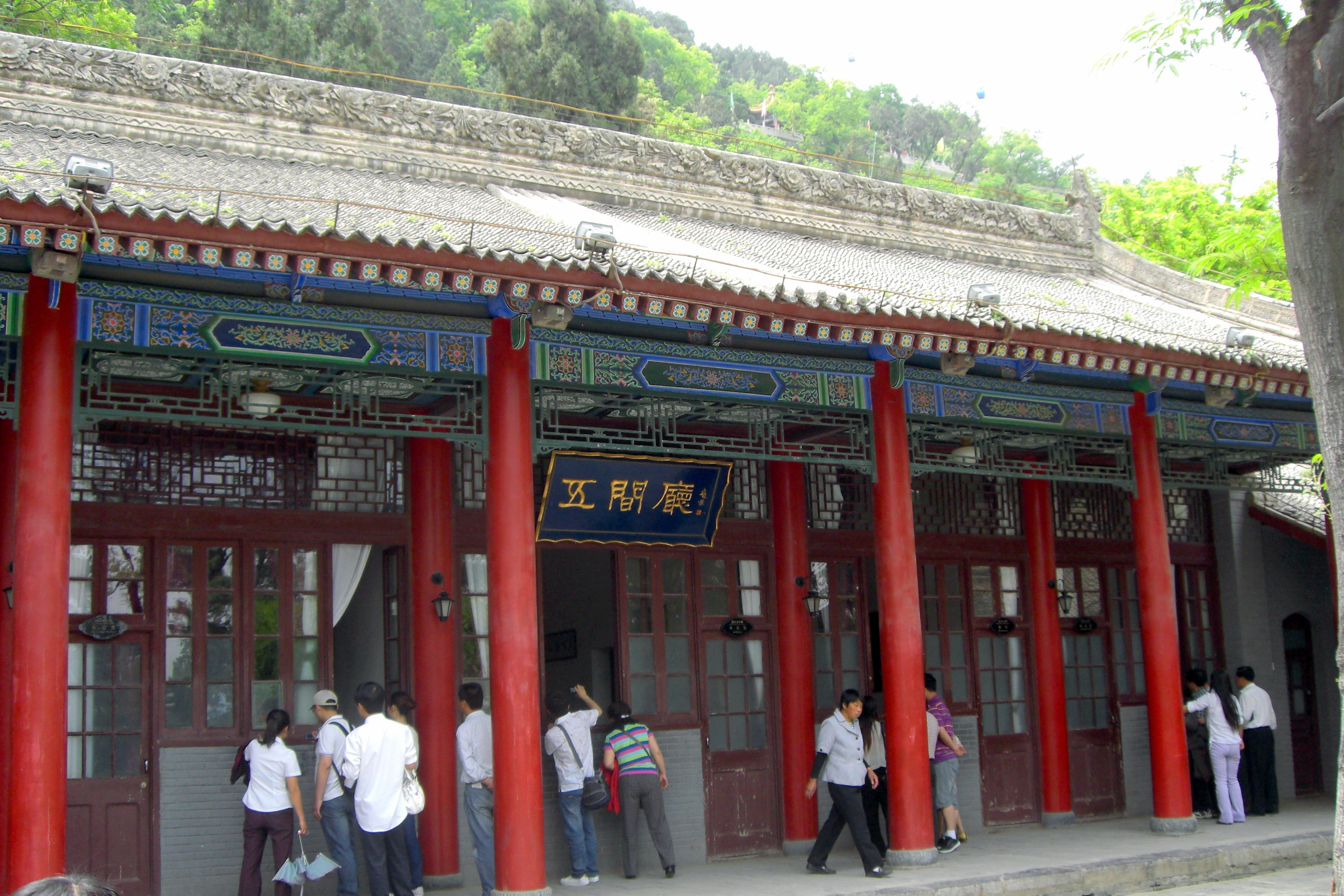
Tourists explore the Wujianting where Chiang was staying before his capture.

Chiang Kai-shek and the Nationalists believed that had the Xi'an Incident not occurred, they would have been able to destroy the CCP. This perspective held sway among Taiwanese historians for decades. Some even speculated that had it not been for the Xi'an Incident, Chiang may have had more time not only to defeat the Communists but to prepare China to fight Japan, potentially sparing it from the calamities it experienced. According to Chiang's own account, Zhang completely regretted his actions after reading Chiang's diary, saying "Had I known one-tenth of what is in this diary, I would certainly not have done this rash act." He claims that Zhang and Yang decided to release him unconditionally, and contritely listened to a lecture from Chiang before he left.

In China, the story of the Xi'an Incident glorifies the CCP as the country's savior. Without pressure from the CCP, Chiang would have steadfastly refused to confront Japan. And without the CCP's foresighted offer of an alliance during the moment of crisis, the Nationalist government could have been thrown into the hands of the collaborationist faction under He Yingqin and Wang Jingwei. The CCP has highly praised the patriotic nature of the incident. Zhou Enlai applauded Zhang Xueliang as "a hero of the nation and a man of eternal merit."

Early historians of the crisis, writing from all perspectives, assigned it serious importance. For example, the first book-length study of the topic in English, by Tien-wei Wu, is subtitled "the pivotal point in modern Chinese history". But beginning in the 1990s, historians have started to downplay the impact of the event. Parks Coble writes that "the basic concepts" determining Nationalist policy remained the same, and that even before the coup, Chiang had already decided on a course of confrontation with Japan. Rana Mitter points out that the terms agreed to at Xi'an differed little from the outline of a deal that had been in the works for months. Hans van de Ven argues that the main importance of the Xi'an Incident was that both the CCP and Chiang survived, given how close both got to destruction.

At the spot on the mountain where Zhang Xueliang's bodyguards captured Chiang Kai-shek, the Nationalist government built a monument called the "National Resurrection Pavilion" (民族復興亭; Mínzú Fùxīng Tíng). It was renamed the "Seizing Chiang Pavilion" (捉蒋亭; Zhuō Jiǎng Tíng) after 1949, and again renamed to the "Bingjian Pavilion" in the 1980s. In 1982, the historic sites involved in the Xi'an Incident were part of the Second Batch of Major Historical and Cultural Sites Protected at the National Level. They remain popular tourist attractions in China in the early twenty-first century.

== See also ==
- Outline of the Chinese Civil War

== Bibliography ==
- Barnouin, Barbara; Yu, Changgen (2006). Zhou Enlai: A Political Life. Hong Kong: The Chinese University Press. ISBN 978-0-674-29011-2.
- Bertram, James M (1938). First Act in China: The Story of the Sian Mutiny. New York: Viking Press. pp. 118–122.
- Chen, Jian (2024). Zhou Enlai: A Life. Cambridge, Massachusetts: Belknap Press.
- Coble, Parks M. (1991). Facing Japan: Chinese politics and Japanese imperialism; 1931 – 1937. Cambridge, Mass.: Council on East Asian Studies, Harvard Univ. ISBN 9780674290112.
- Coble, Parks M. (2023). The Collapse of Nationalist China: How Chiang Kai-shek Lost China's Civil War. Cambridge New York, NY: Cambridge University Press. ISBN 978-1-009-29761-5.
- Dillon, Michael (2020). Zhou Enlai: The Enigma Behind Chairman Mao. New York: I.B. Tauris.
- Eastman, Lloyd E. (1991). "Nationalist China during the Nanking decade, 1927–1937". The Nationalist Era in China, 1927–1949. New York: Cambridge University Press. ISBN 0521385911.
- Foreign Relations of the United States (IV ed.). 1936.
- Frank, Richard (2020). Tower of Skulls: A History of the Asia-Pacific War: July 1937 – May 1942. W. W. Norton & Company.
- Gao, Hua (2018). How the Red Sun Rose: The Origins and Development of the Yan'an Rectification Movement. The Chinese University of Hong Kong Press. ISBN 9789629968229.
- Garver, John W. (1988). Chinese-Soviet Relations, 1937–1945: The Diplomacy of Chinese Nationalism. New York: Oxford University Press. ISBN 0195363744.
- Gillin, Donald (1967). Warlord: Yen Hsi-shan in Shansi Province, 1911-1949. Princeton: Princeton University Press.
- Hammond, Ken (2023). China's Revolution and the Quest for a Socialist Future. New York, NY: 1804 Books. ISBN 9781736850084.
- Ienaga, Saburo (1978). Pacific War, 1931-1945: A Critical Perspective on Japan's Role in World War II. New York: Pantheon Books.
- Itoh, Mayumi (3 October 2016). The Making of China's War with Japan: Zhou Enlai and Zhang Xueliang. Springer. ISBN 978-981-10-0494-0.
- Kolko, Gabriel (1990). The Politics of War: the World and United States Foreign Policy, 1943-1945. New York: Pantheon Books. ISBN 0679727574.
- Kotkin, Stephen (2017). Stalin: Waiting for Hitler, 1929-1941. Penguin Press.
- Mitter, Rana (2013). Forgotten Ally. Houghton Mifflin Harcourt.
- Mitter, Rana (2000). The Manchurian Myth: Nationalism, Resistance, and Collaboration in Modern China. University of California Press.
- Pantsov, Alexander V (2012). Mao: The Real Story. Translated by Levine, Stephen I. New York: Simon and Schuster.
- Pantsov, Alexander V (2023). Victorious in Defeat: The Life and Times of Chiang Kai-shek, 1887–1975. Translated by Levine, Stephen I. New Haven: Yale University Press.
- Peng, Lü (2023). A History of China in the 20th Century. Translated by Doar, Bruce (1st ed.). Singapore: Palgrave Macmillan. ISBN 978-981-99-0733-5.
- Qian, Ying (2024). Revolutionary Becomings: Documentary Media in Twentieth-Century China. New York, NY: Columbia University Press. ISBN 9780231204477.
- Sheng, Michael (1992). "Mao, Stalin, and the Formation of the Anti-Japanese United Front: 1935-1937". The China Quarterly. 129 (129): 149–170. doi:10.1017/S0305741000041266.
- Short, Philip (2016). Mao: The Man Who Made China. London: I.B. Tauris. ISBN 1-784-53463-3.
- So, Wai-Chor (2002). "The Making of the Guomindang's Japan Policy, 1932–1937: The Roles of Chiang Kai-Shek and Wang Jingwei". Modern China. 28 (2). Sage Publications: 213–252. doi:10.1177/009770040202800203. JSTOR 3181354. S2CID 143785141.
- Spence, Jonathan (1990). The Search for Modern China.
- "国务院关于公布第二批全国重点文物保护单位名单的通知 (2nd Designations)" (in Chinese). State Administration of Cultural Heritage. 23 February 1982. Archived from the original on 24 April 2012.
- Taylor, Jay (2009). The Generalissimo. Cambridge: Harvard University Press. ISBN 978-0674033382.
- van de Ven, Hans (2003). War and Nationalism. New York: Routledge.
- Watt, John R. (2014). Dudbridge, Glen; Pieke, Frank (eds.). Saving Lives in Wartime China. Leiden: Brill.
- Will, Pierre-Étienne (2013). Xi'an, 1900–1940: From isolated Backwater to Resistance Center. Boston: Brill.
- Worthing, Peter (2016). General He Yingqin: The Rise and Fall of Nationalist China. Cambridge: Cambridge University Press. ISBN 9781107144637.
- Wu, Tien-wei (1976). The Sian Incident: A Pivotal Moment in Modern Chinese History. Ann Arbor: University of Michigan Press.
- Yang, Benjamin (1990). From Revolution to Politics: Chinese Communists on the Long March. Boulder, Colorado: Westview Press.
- Yang, Kuisong (2020). "Sino-Soviet Diplomacy Under the Threat of War". In Shen, Zhihua (ed.). A Short History of Sino-Soviet Relations, 1917–1991. Translated by Xia, Yafeng. Singapore: Palmgrave Macmillan and Social Sciences Academic Press.
