= Wayaobu =

Wayaobu may refer to:

- Wayaobu Subdistrict, a subdistrict in Zichang, Yan'an, Shaanxi, China
- Wayaobu Manifesto
