= Dong Jianwu =

Chinese Anglican priest and communist spy (1891–1970)

Dong Jianwu (Chinese: 董健吾, 1891 – 25 December 1970) was a Chinese Episcopalian priest and an agent of the Chinese Communist Party. A graduate of St. John's University, Shanghai, he became a CCP agent in 1928 and later raised the children of Mao Zedong. He also accompanied the American Journalist Edgar Snow to Yan'an. He died during the Cultural Revolution in 1970.

== Life ==
Dong was born to a Christian family in Qingpu, Shanghai, in 1891. He entered St. John's University, Shanghai to study theology in 1914 and graduated in 1917. In 1924 he returned to work at St. John's University. After the May Thirtieth Movement in 1925, he removed a flag of the United States on campus and replaced it with a flag of the Republic of China. He was thus forced to leave the university and became a priest at St. Peter's Church, Shanghai.

In 1926, Pu Huaren introduced him to work under the warlord Feng Yuxiang as the secretary of the department of propaganda and lead labour movements in Luoyang, Henan. After he left Feng, Pu and Liu Bojian introduced him to join the Chinese Communist Party in 1928. He joined the Central Special Branch of the CCP in the same year as an agent. He rescued other partisans and participated in the assassination of Bai Xin under Chen Geng.

In 1930 he opened the Datong Kindergarten to take care of the children of CCP members. Around 1931, Mao Zedong sent his three sons Mao Anying, Mao Anqing, and Mao Anlong to Dong's kindergarten, while he moved to the Jinggang Mountains to lead the Chinese Red Army. In 1932, the CCP decided to close the kindergarten. Dong raised Mao's children until he sent them to the Soviet Union in 1936 under the assistance of Zhang Xueliang.

The CCP arranged Dong to meet Edgar Snow, an American journalist, in Xi'an in 1936. He accompanied Snow and Ma Haide, an American doctor, to Yan'an in June that year.

After the Second Sino-Japanese War broke out in 1937, Dong lost contact with CCP leadership. After the establishment of the People's Republic of China, he was arrested and imprisoned for a year for his connections with Pan Hannian and Yang Fan. When Edgar Snow revisited China in 1960, he asked Mao if he could meet the priest who accompanied him to Yan'an, and Dong was brought to Mao's attention. In 1962 Dong was named a counselor at Shanghai Government. He suffered persecution during the Cultural Revolution and died on 25 December 1970.
