= The Far Eastern Review =

Defunct engineering journal

Far Eastern Review
- Editor: G. B Rea
- Categories: Journal
- Frequency: Monthly
- Format: 13 in × 10 in (330 mm × 250 mm)
- Publisher: George Bronson Rea
- Founder: George Bronson Rea
- Founded: 1904
- Final issue: February 1942 (see Reference Note #3)
- Based in: Manila, later Shanghai
- Language: English

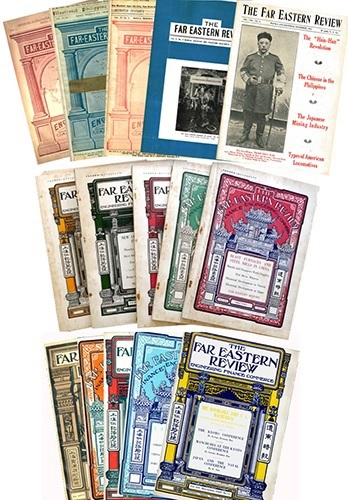
Showing how front covers of The Far Eastern Review changed between the year 1904 and 1921

The Far Eastern Review,(traditional Chinese: 遠東時報; simplified Chinese: 远东时报; pinyin: Yuǎndōng shíbào) hereafter referred to as the FER, was an English-language Engineering, Industry & Commerce journal started in 1904. Its final issue is understood to be October 1941 although this is not confirmed. The often long editorials were mostly written by the publisher and chief editor G. B. Rea until his death in 1936. Many technical articles were contributed by engineers who were expertise in given fields and often they were the chief engineers in charge of specific development projects in the Far East during the early 20th century. Many of these contributions were well-illustrated with photographs, maps and engineering drawings.

== Ownership ==
The FER was owned solely by the publisher, George Bronson Rea, who preferred to be referred to as "Geo. Bronson Rea". For the first eight years of publication Rea received a U.S. Government subsidy by way of the guaranteed purchase of one thousand copies which were distributed as annual subscriptions to overseas commercial, educational and government institutions (mostly in the U.S.A.) Rea also received travel expenses for his pollical lobbying work done for the Philippines colonial administration. However, later Rea ran afoul of the U.S. administration and the publishing subsidies were withdrawn meaning that only advertising revenues and Rea's own money kept the magazine afloat, although with increasing difficulty as the years went by. The most the print run ever reached was an estimated 3000 copies, one third of which continued to be sent overseas although no longer paid for directly by the U.S. Government after about 1913. It is unlikely that many subscriptions were actually received for these especially when Rea became a lobbyist for Japanese interests in Manchuria. During the first decade, annual subscriptions for the journal were only U.S.$2.50 per annum, rising to $5 in the 1920s. The subscription price in China was Mexican $10. Spanish or Mexican (silver) dollars were used extensively for trade within the Far East in the 19th and early 20th centuries.

== Editorship ==
G. B. Rea retained his position as editor-in-chief from the inception of the journal in 1904 until his death in 1936. However, he travelled frequently when he was involved in political lobbying in the United States as well during the times that he had accepted advisory appointments to the Chinese government and later the Japanese-controlled government of the "puppet" state of Manchukuo. In consequence of his absences, he appointed a succession of associate editors and/or assistant editors. In chronological order these were:

- Robert B. Westcott (1905–1907)
- William Crozier (1907–1912)
- W. H. Donald (1912–20)
- P.L. Bryant (1915–1917)
- Patrick Gallagher (1920–1922)
- George Sokolsky (1926–1931)
- C.J. Laval (1933–41)

== Editorial stance ==
When Rea first produced this journal, his mission statement undertook to provide a comprehensive record of industrial, commercial, financial and resource development within the Philippines particularly, but also the rest of the Far East. This would provide unbiased intelligence for capitalists seeking opportunities for profitable investment openings in manufacturing and the extension of trade. The very first edition of June 1904, included an editorial statement of the magazine's "Policy", promising "We have no space for long-winded political discussions, nor for gossip". Regrettably, as the years went by Rea strayed from this mission statement and became personally guilty of doing completely the opposite.

== Circulation ==
According to an editorial column in the FER, the maximum print run for this monthly journal was 3,000 copies. One thousand of these were sent to overseas academic institutions, business associations and government agencies. The remainder were sold by private subscription or as individual copies at newsagents and bookshops.

== Advertising revenue ==
With a very limited print run, the journal was heavily dependent on advertising revenue. At its height during the late 1920s, the journal carried as many as 80 pages of full-paid advertisements although this volume declined rapidly in the 1930s as the journal became progressively Japan-centric in content causing non-Japanese advertisers to withdraw their support. Following the establishment of the Japanese puppet state of Manchukuo, Rea accepted the offer of an appointment as Counsellor to their Ministry of Foreign Affairs. This was regarded as a betrayal by the Chinese Kuomintang Government, which slapped a ban on the postal distribution of the journal within the Chinese mail service.) Rea's journal was thereafter ostracized by many foreign governments and communities overseas who had sympathies for China and the ability to distribute the FER rapidly faltered. Rea infuriated many when he travelled to the U.S. in 1933 and 1934 and addressed various American academic and professional forums defending the establishment of the state of Manchoukuo. During at least one address he stated: "If we cannot stop Japan, why should we make her our enemy by calling her names, marshalling world opinion against her and doing our best to outlaw her in the family of nations." Rea further infuriated many member states of the League of Nations when he presented an address to the Pan-Pacific Club of Tokyo on 19th. May 1933 entitled "The Case For Manchoukou", accusing the League of not being interested in hearing Manchoukuo's side of the case for their "legitimate" right of existence. By the mid-1930s the number of paid-for advertisement pages had diminished to only an average of 25 pages and subscriptions for the journal had fallen dramatically.

== Content – indexes and contents lists ==
A monthly "CONTENTS" list was published for most editions but not always. Additionally, an annual "INDEX" for the preceding annual volume was published as a Supplement and provided to subscribers to the journal but this was erratic and the style inconsistent, varying between two and twelve pages. These Contents and Indexes have been researched and may be downloaded from the Internet Archive

== Decline and closure ==
After G. B. Rea's death in 1936, the then Editor, C.J. Laval, continued with publishing and editing of the journal although it is unclear if he took over formal ownership of the business. By this time China was wracked by war, the Japanese having invaded the country which included attacks on Shanghai. It is probable that Lavel just carried on the best he could, paying the bills when income was sufficient to do so. By 1937 the number of paid advertisements pages had diminished from some 80 pages monthly to only 26 and mostly only from Japanese companies active in Manchukou. In November 1942, all foreign residents of Shanghai, with the exception of nationals of Japan's allies were rounded up by the Japanese Kempeitai and detained in camps, thus sealing the final fate of The Far Eastern Review. It is not known if Laval was among those interned or whether he had escaped from Shanghai beforehand. However it was revived after 1945 by a Czech immigrant to England, Hans C. Taussig (1912/13). He sold it to Americans, who, he said promptly closed it down because of its criticism of American involvement in Indochina. He then started a journal devoted to Africa.

== Library holdings and accessibility ==
Unlike newspapers, surviving copies of this journal are now very rare. The limited print run of only 3,000 copies has resulted in surviving editions being in the same category as rare books and have become valuable as collector's items. Very few of the paper-covered monthly issues sold separately in Asia have survived because of a climate which is not favourable to the preservation of paper. Fortunately, the publisher included some of U.S.'s leading universities and other institutions on his distribution list for free subscriptions and upon receipt of these journals they were professionally bound together in hard-cover annual compilations, which have survived in better condition. There are listed holdings of these at the University of Michigan; Univ. of California; Princeton; New York Library; Library of Congress and other libraries, and also a digital version maintained by HathiTrust, although access is difficult for people based overseas. SOAS University in London also had an almost complete run of the bound volumes on open-access shelves for holders of a Reader's ticket during the 1990s but the journal has now been withdrawn and is stored offsite. The University of Hong Kong Library (Special Collections) also provided access for Readers’ Ticket holders upon request to their considerable original holdings during the 1990s. However, more recently an application for access was met with the response that they are now stored off-site and have "deteriorated to the extent that they cannot be moved safely". A private collection of this journal gathered from antiquarian book dealers over a 25-year period is also held by a Chinese history researcher who has made downloadable extracts relating to Chinese railways as well as contents lists and annual indexes available on the Internet Archive website or from this Researchgate website link
