= William Henry Donald =

Australian journalist (1875–1946)

- Born: 22 July 1875; Lithgow, New South Wales
- Died: 9 November 1946 (aged 71); Shanghai
- Other name: Donald of China
- Citizenship: Australian
- Occupation: Journalist
- Known for: Journalism; News reporter Advisor to Zhang Xueliang
- Spouse: Mary Wall
- Children: Muriel Mary

William Henry Donald (22 June 1875, Lithgow, New South Wales – 9 November 1946, Shanghai) was an Australian journalist. He worked in China from 1903 to 1940. A confidant of both Zhang Xueliang and the Chiangs, he mediated in the Xi'an Incident.

== Early life in Australia ==
WH Donald began his career as a journalist at the Lithgow Mercury, the local paper of his hometown. He then worked as journalist/editor at the Bathurst National Advocate, the Sydney Daily Telegraph and the Melbourne Argus. In 1901, he was recruited to Hong Kong to work for The China Mail.

== The Donald of China ==
He became a successful journalist at The China Mail, culminating in his resignation as managing editor in 1908 to write about the history of the press in China and Hong Kong.

He influenced a short war between Russia and Japan over China in Japan's favour, but later initiated—through a deliberately provocative newspaper article—an uprising against Japanese imperialism.

In 1911, he moved to Shanghai, where he became a key editor to the economics monthly Far Eastern Review. At the same time he befriended Charlie Soong, the wealthy publisher and father of the Soong sisters, and had known "the present Mesdames Kung, Sun and Chiang [when they] were small children." He resigned from the Far Eastern Review after the managing editor, George Rea, pushed for a more pro-Japanese line for the journal. While in Hong Kong, he made the decision not to learn the Chinese language, and found this to his advantage for the Chinese knew that with him they were assured of the privacy of their conversations. He became a friend and advisor to Sun Yat-Sen and to Generalissimo and Mme. Chiang Kai-shek. He was also an advisor to the "Young Marshal" Zhang Xueliang, the general who kidnapped Chiang Kai-shek at Xi'an in December 1936; some years before the kidnapping, Donald had arranged a cure for Zhang's drug addiction. Emily Hahn described him as having "what is probably the only non-irritating bedside manner in the world. He has vigorous health, vigorous principles and vigorous plans. He does not drink, smoke or tell lies."

== Xi'an Incident ==
In order to force the issue to establish a united front against the Japanese invasion, Young Marshall Zhang Xueliang kidnapped Generalissimo Chiang Kai-shek in what became known as the Xi'an Incident. Donald was the special envoy to Xi'an sent by Soong Mei-ling to negotiate for Chiang's release. He played a pivotal role in convincing his old friend Zhang Xueliang and the CCP to release Chiang. After several rounds of negotiations, Chiang was released to a plane bound for Nanjing escorted by Zhang. When the plane arrived in Nanjing, Zhang was immediately arrested and was incarcerated, staying in prison in China and, later, Taiwan, for more than fifty years. Chiang Kai-shek recorded in his diary that Zhang Xueliang "denied having known beforehand of the revolt and tried soothingly to argue with his chief".

== Later life ==
Donald left Chiang Kai-shek's headquarters at Chongqing in May 1940, after a disagreement with the generalissimo over Chinese policy towards Germany. At this time, the British ambassador described him as a "garrulous old man". However, in early 1942, after touring the Pacific in 1940–41, he set out, at Madame Chiang's request, to return to China.

The Japanese invaders in China had dubbed Donald "the evil spirit of China" for his role in advising the Chinese government in their efforts against the invasion. They had offered growing rewards for his capture, dead or alive. Once they had almost got him, when Zero fighters attacked his plane over China—but his pilot escaped into a cloud bank. In February 1945, it turned out that they had held him for more than three years, without knowing it was him, in one of the Manila prison camps. Donald had been a prisoner since February 1942, when the Japanese arrested him at Manila when he was on his way back to China from New Zealand via the Philippines. During his captivity, he had used a false name.

After a brief visit to New York City in 1945, Donald returned to Shanghai, where he died in 1946. He was farewelled in a state funeral by the government of the Republic of China. As he lay dying in 1946, Donald dictated his recollections to Earl Albert Selle, who produced a biography called Donald of China.

A collection of his correspondence between 1942 and 1946 is held by Columbia University Library.

Donald Place, in the Canberra suburb of Gilmore, is named in his honour.
