= August 1 Declaration =

1935 Chinese Communist Declaration Calling for United Front

August 1 Declaration (Chinese: 八一宣言; pinyin: bā yī xuānyán) is a declaration made by the Chinese Communist Party under the Seventh World Congress of the Comintern. On August 1, 1935, during the Long March, the Central Committee of the Chinese Communist Party (CCP) made public the "Message to all Compatriots on Resistance against Japanese and National Salvation" (Chinese: 為抗日救國告全體同胞書), – a well-publicized declaration calling upon the nation to organize a National United Front for resistance against Japan.

The declaration called upon the Chinese Nationalist Party to end the Chinese Civil War and to unite the "people" in resisting the Japanese invasion. It was one of the first steps to reorganize the Second United Front, which was not declared until 1937, when the Xi'an Incident and the outbreak of the Second Sino-Japanese War forced the Nationalists to work together with the CCP.

It also put forth the proposition that the people throughout the country, irrespective of whichever class or party, should unite and organize a "National Defense Government" and "Anti-Japanese Allied Forces for National Salvation".

== Background ==
After the 1931 Mukden Incident, the CCP called for immediate armed resistance to Japanese imperialism in China. In contrast, the Nationalist government under Chiang Kai-shek followed the policy of "first internal pacification, then external resistance" and sought to eliminate warlords and the CCP before resisting the Japanese.

== Content ==
The declaration called for the creation of a united front of all Chinese parties, organizations, and people of all circles, including overseas Chinese and ethnic minorities, to oppose the Japanese.

== Afterwards ==
The anti-Japan stance of the CCP increased its popular support.

A December 1936 coup by two Nationalist Generals, the Xi'an Incident, forced Chiang Kai-shek to accept the Second United Front with the CCP to oppose imperial Japan.

== See also ==
- Outline of the Chinese Civil War
- Chinese Soviet Republic
- Wang Ming
- Comintern
