= Yang Yichen =

Yang Yichen is the name of:

- Yang Yichen (Sui dynasty) (died 617), Sui dynasty general
- Yang Yichen (politician), official of the People's Republic of China, Procurator-General of the Supreme People's Procuratorate
