= Wayaobu Manifesto =

The Wayaobu Manifesto (Chinese: 瓦窑堡宣言) is the collective name for three documents published by the Central Committee of the Chinese Communist Party (CCP) following the Wayaobu Conference in late December 1935. The manifesto called for "the most broad national united front" to resist the Empire of Japan during the Second Sino-Japanese War. It promised to open the CCP's membership to Chinese of all classes and to allow any patriots hoping to resist the Japanese to join the Red Army. It announced the CCP's intention to pause land reform and nationalization of industry so as to focus all of their efforts against Japan. The CCP did not expect Chiang Kai-shek to be interested in joining a united front, and labelled him a national traitor.

The conference took place in Wayaobu, northern Shaanxi.

On December 9, 1935, students and other citizens (dubbed the "December Niners") held a demonstration on the Tiananmen Square in Beijing (renamed as Beiping then) to protest Chiang Kai-shek's continued "nonresistance" against the Japanese. City police used violence to suppress the students, turning the fire hoses on them, in the near-freezing weather.

== See also ==
- Xi'an Incident
- Long March

== Bibliography ==
- Yang, Benjamin (1990). From Revolution to Politics: Chinese Communists on the Long March. Boulder, Colorado: Westview Press.
