= Pan Hannian =

Chinese politician

- 潘汉年
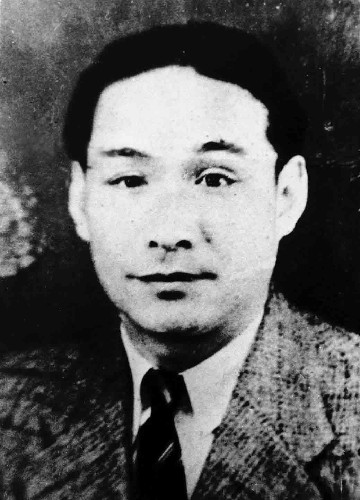
- Born: January 18, 1906
- Died: April 14, 1977 (aged 71)
- Occupations: Intelligence operative, spy, newspaper editor
- Organization: Central Special Branch of the Chinese Communist Party
- Political party: Chinese Communist Party

Pan Hannian (Chinese: 潘汉年; 18 January 1906 – 14 April 1977) was a major figure in the Chinese Communist intelligence by the early 1930s and until 1955.

== History ==
He began his work with the Chinese Communist Party (CCP) in 1926 as a propagandist with the editorial department of the magazine "Oazo" (Huanzhou) and later with "Crossroads" (Shizi Jietou). Pan became a CCP member in February 1927 and was assigned as managing editor of the "Revolutionary Army Daily" (Gemingjun Ribao) in Nanchang. Ordered to Shanghai for the entry of the KMT in April, Pan had barely arrived when the 12 April anti-communist coup forced him underground. This may have been the time when Pan was first assigned intelligence duties. Pan escaped Shanghai with Zhou Enlai to Wuhan, but eventually returned to Shanghai to take up a leadership position with their paramount intelligence organization, the CCP Central Committee Special Branch (Zhongyang Teke, CCSB). He became the head of CCSB's Second Section (intelligence) and later the Third Section (Red Squads), in 1931-33 stayed on in Shanghai as the rest of Central Committee was evacuated under intense pressure from KMT intelligence and police in the Shanghai International Settlement and the Shanghai French Concession. Pan eventually left Shanghai in 1933 and participated in the Long March, but returned to Shanghai and regularly visited Hong Kong after the 1935 Zunyi Conference.

In 1943, Pan was deceived into meeting with the Japanese collaborator Wang Jingwei. Believing that it would be difficult to explain the circumstances, Pan did not disclose the incident to the CCP at the time.

In 1949, Pan was made a Deputy Mayor of Shanghai.

In 1955, Pan disclosed to the CCP Central Committee the fact that he had met with Wang Jingwei in 1943. This caused Mao Zedong to distrust Pan. On 3 April 1955 Pan was accused by the PRC Ministry of Public Security of "secretly seeking the assistance of the Japanese secret service organs and colluding with the major traitor Wang Jingwei". Pan was imprisoned until his death in 1977 and was posthumously rehabilitated in 1982.
