= Wayaobu Subdistrict =

Wayaobu Subdistrict 瓦窑堡街道
- Subdistrict
- Location within China
- Coordinates: 37°08′16″N 109°39′56″E
- Country: China
- Province: Shaanxi
- Prefecture-level City: Yan'an
- County-level city: Zichang

Population (2010)
  - Total: 113,698

Wayaobu Subdistrict (simplified Chinese: 瓦窑堡街道; traditional Chinese: 瓦窯堡街道; pinyin: Wǎyáobǔ Jiēdào), (Note: Wayaobu is often misspelt "Wayaobao" because the Chinese character 堡 has two pronunciations, both commonly used in placenames. The more common pronunciation is bǎo, but here it is pronounced bǔ.) is a subdistrict in the county-level city of Zichang, Yan'an, Shaanxi, China. As of 2010, Wayaobu had a population of 113,698.

== History ==
On December 17, 1935, Wayaobu held the Wayaobu Conference, where the Central Committee of the Chinese Communist Party met to discuss Chinese class relations, as well as the idea of a united front against Japan. The conference resulted in the Wayaobu Manifesto, which emphasized the urgency of mobilizing to defend against Japan, and called on forming a united front, albeit one without the Nationalist government.

In 2015, Wayaobu was changed from a town to a subdistrict.

== Administrative divisions ==
The subdistrict is divided into seven residential communities (Chinese: 社区; pinyin: shèqū) and 36 administrative villages (Chinese: 行政村; pinyin: xíngzhèng cūn).
