= Campaign to Suppress Bandits in Northeast China =

1945 Chinese military campaign

Campaign to suppress bandits in northeast China
- Part of the Chinese Civil War
Date	November 1945 – April 1947
Location	Northeast China
Result	Communist victory

Belligerents
Republic of China	Chinese Communist Party

Commanders and leaders
Li Huatang; Xie Wendong (executed); Zhang Yuxin; Wang Naikang; Jiang Pengfei	Lin Biao; Luo Ronghuan; Chen Yun; Peng Zhen; Gao Gang

Strength
110,000+	100,000+

Casualties and losses
110,000+	Several thousands

The campaign to suppress bandits in northeast China (东北剿匪) was a counterinsurgency operation waged by the Chinese Communist Party against bandits and guerrillas affiliated with the Kuomintang near the end of the Chinese Civil War.

== Prelude ==
Due to the grave communist blunder, nationalists had an upper hand in the initial struggle for the control of Northeast China. Despite being reaching the region before the nationalists could, vast majority portion of the region was dominated by the bandits sided with the nationalists. Bandits under the command of Ma Yuechuan (马越川) with more than eighteen thousand troops, including artillery and cavalries controlled most of Nenjiang (province), and attacked Martial Art Temple region of (Wu Miao Zi, 武庙子) in Tailai (泰来) county, succeeded in killing the communist commander-in-chief of Tailai (泰来) Military Sub-Region, Zhang Pingyang (张平洋). The vital communication line between the region to the north of Changchun and south of Changchun was controlled by three thousand bandits headed by Ma Xishan (马喜山) and Zheng Yunfeng (郑云峰). Communist controlled trains were constantly ambushed and the greatest casualties suffered in an ambush exceeded a hundred. In Hejiang, over twenty thousand bandits under the command of Li Huatang (李华堂) and Xie Wendong (谢文东) struck numerous times, including successfully killing Sun Xilin (孙西林), the communist deputy mayor of Jiamusi. However, the bandits made a serious blunder when they indiscriminately murdered more than two hundred innocent ethnic Korean civilians in three villages in execution style in Mishan (密山) County, even babies of several weeks old were not spared. The mass execution and the subsequent burning down of every building in the village had outraged the local populace, and ethnic Koreans in the local area were firmly allied with communists as a result.

In Heilongjiang, the rear area of communists in Northeast China, the bandits were most numerous, totaling more than seventy thousands, all received ranks and titles from Chiang's government because the nationalists planned to use them to harass the rear area of their communist enemy. The largest band of bandits were headed by Shang Qiyue (尚其悦), totaling over ten thousands, struck many time, succeeding raiding communist held areas numerous times. In Yan'an (延安) County, (communist party) secretary Zhao Guang (赵光) was ambushed and killed when he was sent to Tongbei (通北) County. Gu Yanling (顾延岭), the communist chief of Xunke (逊克) County and two squads of communist soldiers totaling eighteen were captured and executed by being buried alive. Communist garrison of Sunwu (孙吴) County totaling forty soldiers were also executed by being buried alive after their capture. However, such brutal execution only strengthened communist resolve to exterminate the bandits to avenge the death of their comrades, which totaled 154 in a single region to the north of Changchun along. Another unexpected consequence of such brutal methods of execution was that the highly disciplined regular nationalist army sent to Northeast China later on was equally outraged with the bandits' behavior like the local populace, and not wanting to be associated with the bandits and thus had their image tarnished, hence they were not enthusiastic in coordinating their military operations with these bandits to fight together against the communists, despite the fact that Chiang's government rewarded most of the bandit chiefs with higher ranks than these nationalist regular army commanders. However, the bandits did enjoy the temporary advantage over the communists, controlling over two-thirds of the total territory. For example, in the region to the north of Changchun, twenty-nine out of sixty-five cities and towns were controlled by bandits, and over two-thirds of the rural area was also in the bandits' hands. In Songjiang, communists were only able to control four towns including Bin (宾) County, Hulan (呼兰), Bayan (巴彦) and Shuangcheng, while for the rest, garrisons of fifteen counties totaling over ten thousand troops defected and joined the bandits. The total number of bandits peaked in December 1945 when they strength exceeded 110,000.

== Order of battle ==
With the exception of the initial stage where communist regular army was involved, most of the campaign was largely fought by the militia and irregular forces.

=== Nationalists order of battle ===
Despite rewarding the bandits with military ranks that were often higher than their regular army, the eleven-hundred member strong bandit force in Northeast China was mostly fighting on their own because the regular nationalist army in the south was unwilling to associate themselves with bandits, and thus was not enthusiastic about joining the bandits by fighting along their side. The strength of various groups of bandits included:

- Colonel General Li Huatang (李华堂), commander-in-chief of 1st Army Group of the Northeast Moving Forward Army (totaling 10,000+)
  - Major General Zhang Bojun 张伯钧
  - Major General Liu Shandong 刘山东
- Colonel General Xie Wendong (谢文东), commander-in-chief of 15th Army Group of the Northeast Moving Forward Army (totaling 10,000+)
  - Major General Zheng Yunfeng (郑云峰), brigade commander of Moving Forward Army
  - Major General Sun Rongjiu (孙荣久)
- Lieutenant General Zhang Yuxin (张雨新), army commander of the Advanced Army
- Lieutenant General Wang Naikang (王乃康), deputy-commander of the Advanced Army
- Lieutenant General Jiang Pengfei (姜朋飞), army commander of the Newly Organized 27th Army
  - Major General Li Mingxin (李明信)
  - Major General Cui Dagang (崔大刚)
- Lieutenant General Ma Yuechuan (马越川), army commander of Northeast Recovery Army (totaling 18,000+)
- Colonel General Ma Xishan (马喜山), commander-in-chief of the Advanced Army (totaling 3,000+)

70,000+ bandits in Heilongjiang, including the largest group below:

- Lieutenant General Shang Qiyue (尚其悦), army commander of Northeast Recovery Army (totaling 10,000+)

=== Chinese Communist Party order of battle ===
In addition to regular army, communists had taken the opportunity to build a strong militia to fight in the campaign, and the total strength exceeded hundred thousand.

- Shandong 7th Division
- 3rd Division of the New Fourth Army
- Tiansong (田松) Squadron
- 359th Brigade
- Self-defense Force (militia): over 100,000

== Initial phase ==
Despite the slight numerical and technical superiority over their communist enemy, the bandits were disorganized and mostly fought independently on their own turf. The lack of overall cooperation between different groups of bandits was due to their intention to keep their own strength and thus provided the communist enemy with the opportunity to concentrate their forces to defeat them one group at a time. According to communists, the campaign was divided into two phases, with the initial phase covering the period from November 1945 through April 1946. At the beginning of this initial phase, communists concentrated on bandits active in the region bounded by Liaoyang in the south and Anshan in the west. On 28 November 1945, communist force attacked the base of bandits in Thousand Mountains (千山; Qiān Shān) and Seventh Ridge (七岭子; Qīlǐngzǐ). After two days of fierce battle, over three thousands of bandits were killed or captured. The communists then turned their attention to strengthen their control of the troops by forming units which could be absolutely controlled. Starting at squad level, then to the platoon level, and the next was battalion level, and finally, regimental level. Once the communists had the absolute control of an entire regiment, the unit was sent out to engage bandit group with larger number. In the meantime, communist militia was also established in the form of Self-defense Force, which would eventually do the major portion of the fighting. After communist Shandong 7th Division and 359th Brigade had arrived to in the beginning of February 1946, the local communists strength was further expanded and larger offensives against bandits were launched.

By the end of March 1946, over 212 major offensives against bandits were launched, and all resulted in communist victory. A total of 78,495 bandits were killed / captured / defected, with over 25,500 repeating rifles, 911 handguns, 52 artillery pieces, and 618 machine guns and other weaponry such as single shot rifles were captured in the process. As majority of the bandits were annihilated, communists strengthen the control of their rear area and a total of 118 towns / cities formally in the hands of bandits had been taken by the communists. With the exception of the region to the north of Changchun where over thirty thousand bandits remained active, all bandits in other communist region behind the frontline had been exterminated by March 1946. On 7 July 1946, communists held a meeting to analyze the situation and issued order to strengthen the popular support and to mobilize the local population via land reform. Meanwhile, communists decided to take the advantage of the stalemate reached between the nationalists and the communists in Northeast China to launch additional campaigns against the bandits in their area of control. Communists launched another round of offensive in the region to the north of Changchun and by the end of August 1946, another ten-thousand bandits were annihilated. On 29 August 1946, communist high command ordered the communist force in Northeast China to use September to prepare for the incoming conflict with regular nationalist army in the south because intelligence indicates that the nationalist force in the south would launch a campaign to destroy the communist base in the northern part of Northeast China. The communists in Northeast China consequently ordered their regular force to prepare for the income conflict and the task to exterminate bandits was transferred to militias and local garrisons.

== Main phase ==
After communists were forced to give up large cities including Siping, Changchun and Jilin City, the surviving thirty thousand bandits behind the communist frontline had their hope up again and increased their strikes against the communists in the rear. However, due to the rapid military success, the regular nationalist army was even less enthusiastic in cooperating and joining forces with bandits because they felt that the communists could be defeated without the help from bandits, who would only be a burden to the regular nationalist army for tarnishing their image due to the bandits' notoriety. Seizing on the opportunity, the communists were quick to exploiting the internal division among nationalist forces and planned another round of offensives. According to the communist, the main phase of the campaign was period from June 1946 to April 1947. The surviving 30,000 strong bandits were divided into six groups, active in six regions behind the communist frontline:

- 5,000+ bandits in the region to the south of Harbin and along the Songhua River often struck places including Shuangcheng, Wuchang City, Bin (宾) County, Elm Tree (Yu Shu, 榆树), and Hulan (呼兰).
- 5,000+ bandits in the region to the west of Liaoyang, often struck places including Daze (大责), Qian'an (乾安) and Forward Flag (Qian Bu Qi, 前部旗). This is only group that actually cooperated with regular nationalist army, acting as the scouts of the latter.
- 5,000+ bandits active in Nenjiang (province)
- 5,000+ bandits active in regions to the east of Changchun
- In Hejiang, over 40 bands of bandits totaling more than 8,000 had successfully severed the railway from Mudanjiang to Jiamusi by taking counties including Dongning (东宁), Dong'an (东安), Luobei (萝北) and Tongjiang. Most high ranking commanders of bandits belonged to this group, including Li Huatang (李华堂), Xie Wendong (谢文东), Zhang Yuxin (张雨新), and Sun Rongjiu (孙荣久).

The communist high command in Northeast China decided in June 1946 that it was critical to secure the rear area behind their frontline to concentrate on fighting the regular nationalist army in the front, so the communist force was redeployed to exterminate bandits by concentrating on the major groups first, and then the smaller ones. In Hejiang, six thousand mobile strike force would first exterminate bandits in the regions of Tongjiang, Luobei (萝北), Fujin (富锦), Yilan (依兰), Peace Town (Tai Ping Zheng, 太平镇) and the regions to the north and the east of Boli (勃利). Afterward, they would attack bandits in Baoqing (宝清) region in a pincer movement from both the east and the west. Communist force in Mudanjiang was responsible for exterminating bandits in Dong'an (东安), Mishan (密山), Muling (穆棱) and Dongning (东宁). Communist force in Harbin was responsible for exterminating bandits in regions including Yanshou (延寿), Muohe (沫河), Weihe (苇河), Tonghe (通河), and Fangzheng (方正). The communists planned their offensive in three stages.

During the first stage of their offensive that lasted from June 1946 through the end of August 1946, communists deployed the 717th Regiment and the 719th Regiment of the 359th Brigade to support the local communist force from Hejiang and Mudanjiang Military Regions to attack bandits headed by Xie Wendong (谢文东) in three fronts in the regions of Dong'an (东安) and Mishan, (密山). After two battles, over six thousand bandits were killed while the surviving bandits fled to the region of Baoqing (宝清) and Fujin (富锦). By the end of June, bandits in Dongning (东宁) region headed by Wang Laolin (王老林) were also annihilated. The communists continued their attack eastward from Dong'an (东安) toward Tiger Forest (Hulin, 虎林) and Rao (饶) River regions, annihilating local bandits. Meanwhile, another communist force cross the Wanda (完达) Mountain and with the help of communist force in Hejiang, attacked bandits fled to Baoqing (宝清). On 1 July 1946, in the region of Youtou (尤头) Bridge and Toudaihezi (头道河子), the surviving bandits headed by Xie Wendong (谢文东) was once again defeated. On 3 July 1946, communist Hejiang mobile strike force attacked northward to pursue the 1,400 strong bandit force that fled to the regions of Huachuan (桦川) and Fujin (富锦) and joined the local bandits. After eight days, the bandits were annihilated and by 12 July 1946, 972 bandits were captured alive. Communist subsequently launched intensive political / psychological / propaganda offensives and over 800 surviving surrendered. Huachuan (桦川) and Fujin (富锦) regions were cleared and by the end of August 1946, near ten thousand bandits were killed. In Songjiang, communists in Harbin uncovered a nationalist underground intelligence directly controlled by the bandits and the bandit chiefs including Jiang Pengfei (姜朋飞), Li Mingxin (李明信) and Cui Dagang (崔大刚) were all arrested.

The second stage covers the period from September 1946 through the end of December 1946. After suffering defeats, the surviving 1,500 bandits headed by Li Huatang (李华堂), Xie Wendong (谢文东), and Zhang Yuxin (张雨新) fled to the region of Yilan (依兰), Boli (勃利), and Linkou (林口) bordered by Songhua River in the north, and Mudanjiang in the west. Communist 359th Brigade and Hejiang and Mudanjiang forces surrounded the above region and after battles at Zi'erlazi (子尔拉子) and Cold Spring (Han He, 寒春) River, over 140 bandits were killed, 654 bandits surrendered and 121 bandits captured. The communists also captured 738 guns, 110 horses, but the biggest gain was the capture of the bandit chiefs: on 20 November 1946, Xie Wendong (谢文东) was captured by the communist and soon after, Zhang Yuxin (张雨新) was captured. On 2 December 1946, Li Huatang (李华堂) was captured in the forest in the region to northwest of Diaoling (刁翎). In Songjiang, over four thousands bandits were annihilated from early October through 22 November 1946. In the region to the west of Changchun, five thousand bandits headed by Wang Naikang (王乃康) were annihilated by mid-December. In the region to the east of Changchun, after 600 bandits were killed, sixteen groups of bandits surrendered to the communists without a fight.

The third and last stage in the main phase of the campaign covers the period from January 1947 through April 1947, during which the bandit chief Sun Jiurong (孙荣久) was captured on 26 March 1947 in Hejiang. In March and April 1947, communist force in Longjiang took the last four bandit strongholds at Huma (呼玛), Oupu (欧浦) Black Cloud (Wuyun, 乌云), and Muohe (漠河). Over seven thousand bandits were killed, including their chiefs Zhang Bojun (张伯钧) and Liu Shandong (刘山东). By April 1947, the communist victory was complete and the area behind the frontline was cleared of bandits. As a result of their victory, communists had firmly established themselves in Northeast China when their bases in the rear area there were secured and strengthened, which was critical in the victory in Northeast China.

== Outcome ==
Although sharing the common anticommunist goal, the nationalist guerrilla and insurgency warfare was largely handicapped by the enlistment of bandits, and with the lack of active military support of the highly trained nationalist regular army sent to Northeast China after World War II and the unconditional political and financial support of Chiang's government, the communists successfully eradicated bandits turned nationalist guerrillas in Northeast China. Riding on their success, the communist immediately launched Summer Offensive of 1947 in Northeast China against nationalists. The experienced learned in the campaign also helped the communists half a decade later in other counterinsurgency / counter guerrilla campaign campaigns against bandits turned guerrillas allied with nationalists after the communist revolution in China.

== See also ==
- Campaign to Suppress Bandits in Eastern China
- Campaign to Suppress Bandits in Southwestern China
- Campaign to Suppress Bandits in Wuping
- History of the People's Liberation Army
