= Zhang Qinqiu =

Chinese revolutionary and military commander (1904–1968)

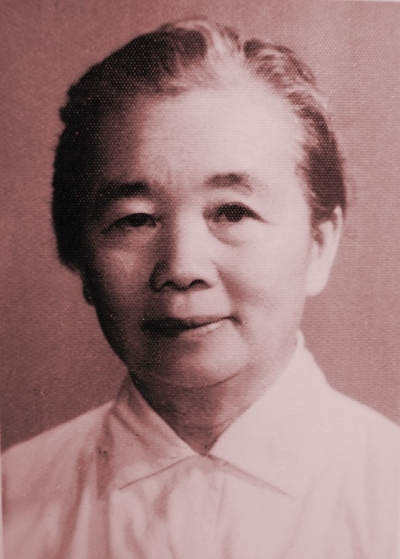
- Zhang in the early 1960s

Vice Minister of Textile Industry
- In office 1949–1968

Personal details
- Born: November 15, 1904 Shimen, Tongxiang, Zhejiang, China
- Died: April 22, 1968 (aged 63)
- Party: Chinese Communist Party
- Spouses: Shen Zemin (m. 1925; died 1933) Chen Changhao (m. 1936; div. 1943) Su Jingguan (m. 1943; died 1964)
- Education: Shanghai University; Moscow Sun Yat-sen University

Chinese name
- Traditional Chinese: 張琴秋
- Simplified Chinese: 张琴秋
Transcriptions
Standard Mandarin
- Hanyu Pinyin: Zhāng Qínqiū
- Wade–Giles: Chang Ch'in-ch'iu
- Military career
- Branch: Chinese Workers' and Peasants' Red Army
- Service years: 1931–1937
- Commands: Women's Independent Regiment, Fourth Front Army
- Conflicts: Fourth encirclement campaign against the Eyuwan Soviet; Long March

Zhang Qinqiu (Chinese: 张琴秋; November 15, 1904 – April 22, 1968) was a Chinese Communist revolutionary, military commander, and politician. She was one of the first female members of the Chinese Communist Party, and one of the 28 Bolsheviks trained in Moscow. As Director of the General Political Department of the Fourth Front Army of the Chinese Red Army, she held the highest wartime position attained by a woman in the Red Army, and Chinese accounts commonly describe her as its only woman general. She went on to command the army's Women's Independent Regiment and took part in the Long March. After the defeat of the Western Route Army she was captured and imprisoned in Nanjing; following her release she became dean of the Chinese Women's University in Yan'an. After the founding of the People's Republic of China, she served as Vice Minister of Textile Industry. Persecuted during the Cultural Revolution, she died by suicide in 1968 and was posthumously rehabilitated in 1979.

== Early life and education ==
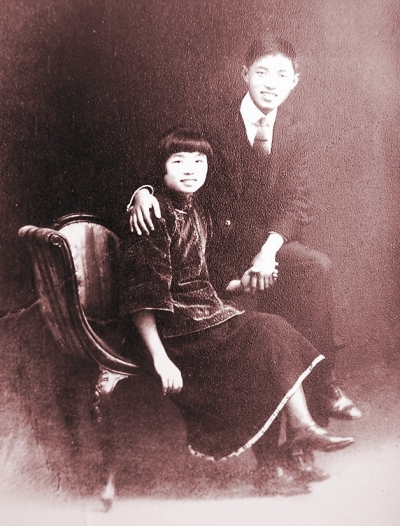
Wedding photo of Zhang Qinqiu and Shen Zemin

Zhang Qinqiu was born on November 15, 1904, to an affluent family in Shimen, Tongxiang, Zhejiang. She entered Hangzhou Girls Normal School (now Hangzhou No. 14 High School) in 1920, before going to Shanghai for further education. In Shanghai she met the famous novelist Mao Dun (Shen Yanbing), who was married to Zhang's elementary school classmate Kong Dezhi, and his younger brother Shen Zemin, one of the earliest members of the Chinese Communist Party (CCP).

In 1924, Zhang entered the sociology department of the left-wing Shanghai University, where Shen Zemin was an instructor and the early Communist leader Qu Qiubai was the department head. Zhang joined the CCP in November 1924, becoming one of the first female CCP members. She married Shen Zemin a year later. Under the leadership of Xiang Jingyu, Zhang and other women students established a night school for women workers in Shanghai, and organized a strike of silk workers in 1924. She also recruited some of the workers into the CCP.

In November 1925, the CCP sent more than 100 party members, including Zhang Qinqiu, to study at Moscow Sun Yat-sen University in the Soviet Union. Shen Zemin joined her soon afterwards. In May 1926, she gave birth to a daughter named Zhang Maya (张玛娅). In Moscow, Zhang and Shen became members of the 28 Bolsheviks, which included future CCP leaders Wang Ming, Bo Gu, Zhang Wentian, and Yang Shangkun. She became proficient in Russian after two years of study, and worked as an interpreter for the CCP. She also worked in textile mills to learn production and management methods.

== Military career ==
In 1930, Zhang and Shen returned to China, leaving their daughter in Moscow. In January 1931, when Wang Ming became the leader of the CCP, Shen Zemin was elected to the 6th Central Committee of the CCP and appointed propaganda chief of the CCP. In 1931, Shen and Zhang went to the Eyuwan Soviet in the border region of Hubei, Henan and Anhui provinces, which was under the leadership of Zhang Guotao.

After being attacked by the 200,000-strong Kuomintang forces in the fourth encirclement campaign, the Fourth Front Army abandoned the Eyuwan base and broke out to the west, eventually settling in the Sichuan–Shaanxi border region. Shen Zemin, who suffered from lung disease, insisted on remaining at the base, where he died in November 1933.

In November 1932, Zhang was appointed Director of the General Political Department of the Fourth Front Army, the highest wartime position ever held by a woman in the Chinese Red Army. Chinese sources commonly describe her as the only woman general of the Red Army, although she was never formally awarded a military rank.

In March 1934, Zhang was appointed Commander and Political Commissar of the Women's Independent Regiment of the Fourth Front Army, commanding 2,000 women soldiers. In 1935, she joined the Long March under the command of Zhang Guotao. In 1936, she married Chen Changhao, political commissar of the Fourth Front Army and another member of the 28 Bolsheviks. In October, 20,000 soldiers of the Fourth Front Army were split into the Western Route Army (西路军) and arrived in the Hexi Corridor of Gansu. The Western Route Army was surrounded and defeated by the forces of the Hui Ma clique then in control of Gansu. Zhang, who had recently given birth and had been forced to leave the infant behind, was captured and sent to the capital Nanjing.

After the Xi'an Incident in December 1936, the Kuomintang government and the CCP suspended their civil war and formed the Second United Front to resist the Japanese invasion. Zhang was released and sent to Yan'an, the de facto capital of the CCP. As more people arrived in Yan'an from areas occupied by Japan, the Chinese Women's University was established and Zhang became its dean. In 1940, Zhang wrote in support of women postal workers in Shanghai who were opposing restrictions on women's employment.

Zhang's husband Chen Changhao had in 1938 gone to the Soviet Union for medical treatment, where he later lived with a Russian woman. Zhang divorced Chen in 1943, and married her third husband Su Jingguan (苏井观), an army doctor. She was a member of the Women's Committee of the Central Committee of the CCP in the 1940s, and attended the Second International Federation of Democratic Women of 1948 in Budapest.

== People's Republic of China ==
After the founding of the People's Republic of China in 1949, Zhang was appointed Vice Minister of Textile Industry, partly because of her earlier experience of organizing textile workers in Shanghai in the 1920s. Her husband Su Jingguan (died 1964) was appointed Vice Minister of Public Health. As a civilian, she did not receive a military rank when the People's Liberation Army first awarded them in 1955, even though many of her former subordinates, including Chen Geng, Xu Shiyou, Hong Xuezhi, and Liu Huaqing, were awarded the rank of general or grand general.

When the Cultural Revolution began in 1966, Zhang and her family members were severely persecuted. In April 1968, she died by suicide, jumping from the balcony of her office. Her ex-husband Chen Changhao also died by suicide. In 1976, her daughter Zhang Maya died by suicide.

After the end of the Cultural Revolution in 1976, Zhang was posthumously rehabilitated. In June 1979, Marshal Xu Xiangqian, her former comrade in the Fourth Front Army, held a memorial ceremony for her, which was attended by Li Xiannian, Wang Zhen, Yu Qiuli, Chen Xilian and Hu Yaobang.

== Bibliography ==
- Kampen, Thomas (2000). Mao Zedong, Zhou Enlai and the Evolution of the Chinese Communist Leadership. NIAS Press. ISBN 978-87-87062-76-3.
- King, Dean (2010). Unbound: A True Story of War, Love, and Survival. Little, Brown. ISBN 978-0-316-07217-5.
- Lee, Lily Xiao Hong; Stefanowska, A. D. (2003). Biographical Dictionary of Chinese Women. M.E. Sharpe. ISBN 978-0-7656-0798-0.
- Lee, Lily Xiao Hong (2004). "The Chinese Women's Movement Before and After the Long March". In Jie Tao; Bijun Zheng; Shirley L. Mow (eds.). Holding Up Half the Sky: Chinese Women Past, Present, and Future. Feminist Press at CUNY. p. 76. ISBN 978-1-55861-465-9.
