= Xie Wendong =

Chinese general (1887–1946)

- 謝文東
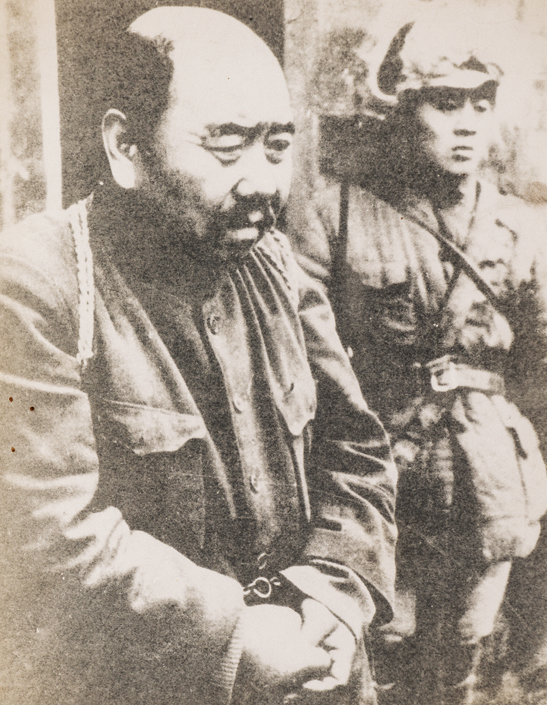
- Born: 1887; Kuandian, Liaoning, Qing dynasty
- Died: 3 December 1946; Boli County, Hejiang Province, Republic of China
- Occupations: bandit, anti-Japanese general in Northeast China, lieutenant general in the National Revolutionary Army
- Military career
- Allegiance: Manchukuo; China
- Rank: Lieutenant General
- Conflicts: Second Sino-Japanese War; Chinese Civil War

Xie Wendong (originally named Xie Wenhan; 1887 – 3 December 1946) a Manchu, was a general of the Northeast Anti-Japanese United Army and commander of its Eighth Army. He later surrendered to the Japanese. Following Japan's unconditional surrender, he was incorporated into the Nationalist government. He was executed on 3 December 1946 during the suppression of banditry in Northeast China.

== Biography ==
Xie Wendong was born in Yongdian Village, Kuandian County, Liaoning in 1887. He was originally a bandit in Northeast China. In 1925, due to a kidnapping incident, he moved his family to the Tulongshan area of Yilan County, Heilongjiang, where he served as a leader of the local militia. After the Mukden incident, he became a member of General Li Du's Anti-Japanese Self-Defense Army. Later, he organized the Anti-Japanese People's Salvation Army, which became an important part of the Northeast Anti-Japanese Volunteer Army. In 1936, he joined the Northeast Anti-Japanese United Army. On 19 March 1939, he surrendered to Japan after running out of ammunition and food. He then joined the Manchukuo Imperial Army. Following the surrender of Japan, Xie Wendong joined the National Revolutionary Army and participated in the Chinese Civil War. He served as the Lieutenant General Commander of the Second Army Group of the Hejiang Provincial Security Army. On 20 November 1946, Xie Wendong and his son were captured by the 359th Brigade of the Eighth Route Army. On November 21, Xie Wendong and his son were escorted to Yilan County. On 23 November Lin Biao sent a telegram to commend the capture operation. On 3 December a public trial was held in Boli County, and Xie Wendong was executed after the trial.
