= 2nd Priamur Rifle Division =

- Active: 1922–1934
- Country: Far Eastern Republic; Russian SFSR; Soviet Union
- Branch: People's Revolutionary Army; Red Army
- Type: Infantry
- Part of: Special Red Banner Army (became Special Red Banner Far Eastern Army, 1929–1934)
- Engagements: Russian Civil War; Sino-Soviet conflict (1929)

The 2nd Priamur Rifle Division (Russian: 2-я Приамурская стрелковая дивизия; alternately translated as the 2nd Amur Rifle Division) was an infantry division of the Red Army during the interwar period, originally formed as part of the People's Revolutionary Army (NRA) of the Soviet puppet Far Eastern Republic (FER) during the final stages of the Russian Civil War.

== History ==
After the abolition of the Eastern Front of the Far Eastern Republic on 2 May 1922, its units were used to form the forces of Amur Krai and the Consolidated Rifle Division. The latter included the 1st Chita and Consolidated Rifle Brigades, and its commander, Yakov Pokus (the former commander of the Eastern Front), served simultaneously as commander of the forces of Amur Krai until 27 September 1922. The Consolidated Rifle Division was redesignated as the 2nd Priamur Rifle Division on 20 July 1922, when the forces of the NRA were reduced to two divisions, with Pokus continuing in command. As a result, the 5th Khabarovsk Rifle Brigade joined the division as its 6th Khabarovsk Rifle Regiment. The 1st Chita Rifle Brigade was disbanded on 15 August when the division was reorganized to a triangular structure of three rifle regiments.

For the mopping up of White forces in the Far East, the division became part of the Shock Group of the NRA between September and November. It fought in the defense of Khabarovsk in September, and between 4 and 25 October the Primorsky operation, during which it captured Sviyagino, Yevgenyevka, Spassk, Nikolsk-Ussuriysky, the area of Voznesenskoye and Monastyrishche, and Vladivostok. When the FER was officially absorbed into the Russian SFSR in November, the NRA became the 5th Army. After the latter was disbanded in June 1924, the 2nd Division became part of the 19th Rifle Corps of the Siberian Military District. In 1924 Pokus was promoted to assistant corps command. During this period, the division, as an active-duty unit, had a strength of 2,400 regulars that could be expanded to 13,000 in wartime. From 1926, the 2nd Battalion of the division's 4th Rifle Regiment trained in amphibious operations with the gunboats of the Amur Military Flotilla.

=== 1929 Sino-Soviet conflict ===
In August 1929, in preparation for the Sino-Soviet conflict over the Chinese Eastern Railway, the division became part of the Special Far Eastern Army (ODVA), later given the Red Banner (ODVKA). At the time, it was commanded by Ivan Onufriyev and included the 4th Insk, 5th, and 6th Rifle Regiments, the 2nd Separate Cavalry Battalion, and the 2nd Artillery Regiment. The 5th Rifle Regiment was stationed at Blagoveshchensk and was relieved there by the 26th Rifle Division, which allowed it to concentrate with the rest of the division across from the mouth of the Sungari in eastern Manchuria. The division was tasked with conducting the Sungari operation in cooperation with the Amur Flotilla, which would threaten Harbin with the defeat of the Chinese Sungari flotilla by the Amur flotilla and successive amphibious raids on Tungchiang and Fuchin. The 2nd Battalion of the 4th Rifle Regiment trained other units of the division in amphibious tactics and formed the assault group of the division along with two battalions each from the 5th and 6th Rifle Regiments.

After the gunboats of the Amur flotilla defeated the Chinese ships on the morning of 12 October, the first units of the division landed from barges on the Chinese side of the Amur, quickly followed by Onufriyev and the division headquarters. The opposing units of the 9th Kirin Mixed Brigade resisted their advance stubbornly, limiting the Soviets to a six-kilometer advance in as many hours to reach Tungchiang itself. After the Chinese began retreating in the late afternoon, the division routed them, inflicting an estimated nearly 1,000 killed and wounded in return for losses of 172 killed and 100 wounded. After the assault, the division regrouped and handed over Tungchiang to GPU troops to prepare for the raid on Fuchin.

The raid on Fuchin was conducted by the 1st and 3rd Battalions of the division's 5th Regiment. Although the landing was delayed by Chinese fire on the Soviet minesweepers, the 3rd Battalion routed the first line of Chinese trenches held by forces of the 7th Kirin Mixed Brigade, but the 1st Battalion was repulsed in a frontal attack on the second trench line. The defense of the second trench line proved brief as the fleeing troops from the first trench line caused confusion that allowed the 3rd Battalion to gain a foothold in front of the second trench line. The Soviets broke through the Chinese defenses in four hours of fighting, continuing the advance into the Old City, completing the capture of Fuchin by 20:00. They withdrew from the city on 2 November and returned to Khabarovsk. Despite the military success of the operation, it did not force the Chinese to accede to the Soviet terms. The war ended in the second half of November with the Soviet Dalainour-Manzhouli operation and subsequent advance on Hailar in western Manchuria.

The division was disbanded in accordance with a General Staff directive of 20 December 1933 by an OKDVA order on 7 January 1934. Its headquarters was used to form that of the Poltavka Fortified Region on 17 January 1934.
