= Spassk operation =

The Spassk operation (Russian: Спасская операция), also known as the storming of Spassk, was an attack by the People's Revolutionary Army (NRA) of the Far Eastern Republic (DVR) on the forces of the White Zemskaya Rat at Spassk. The attack took place between 7 and 9 October 1922 during the NRA's Primorsky operation to take control of Primorye, the last major operation of the Russian Civil War. During the operation, the NRA forces stormed Spassk, one of the major settlements of Primorye and an important center of resistance of the Zemskaya rat, clearing the path to Vladivostok.

== Background and planning ==
In 1921, Japanese troops built a strong fortified region on the approaches to Spassk, the main defenses of which consisted of seven field forts, joined by trenches and covered by three to five layers of barbed wire. The fortified region was defended by the Volga group of Major General Viktorin Molchanov, numbering more than 1,800 infantry and 700 cavalry with nine guns and 28 machine guns.

In late 1922, the NRA advanced into Primorye with the goal of destroying the Zemskaya Rat and taking Vladivostok. For the operation, the NRA command assigned the 2nd Priamur Rifle Division the mission of taking forts one and three. With up to 5,000 men, 22 guns and 200 machine guns, the division was split into two columns, one on the left and another on the right. The overwhelming numerical and equipment superiority of the Reds was strengthened by the help of partisans commanded by Mikhail Volsky, operating in the rear of the defenders.

== Operation ==
After the beginning of the offensive, the right column, led by 2nd Priamur Division commander Yakov Pokus, consisting of the 6th Khabarovsk Regiment and a battalion from the Separate Far Eastern Cavalry Brigade, two batteries and an armored train, attacked Fort No. 1 while the left column, led by Stepan Vostretsov with the 5th Amur and 4th Volochayevka Rifle Regiments and the Troitsko-Savsk Cavalry Regiment, the battalion of the junior commanders' school, and an armored train, attacked Fort No. 3. By the end of 8 October Soviet troops captured Fort No. 3, and on the next day together with partisans captured Fort No. 1 and other fortifications. Facing the threat of encirclement, the Spassk garrison abandoned the city. During the storming of Spassk the Whites lost more than 1,000 killed and wounded and roughly 300 captured. Red casualties were 187 killed and 420 wounded.

The success of the storming, which opened the way to Vladivostok, was credited to the massive concentration of forces of the NRA for the main attack and close cooperation with partisans. For their performance in the operation, Vostretsov, Pokus, and several other commanders were awarded the Order of the Red Banner.

== See also ==
- Bibliography of the Russian Revolution and Civil War
- Outline of the Russian Revolution and Civil War
- Index of articles related to the Russian Revolution and Civil War
- The "Russian" Civil Wars, 1916–1926: Ten Years That Shook the World
- Russia in Flames: War, Revolution, Civil War, 1914–1921
- Russia in Revolution: An Empire in Crisis, 1890 to 1928
- Russia: Revolution and Civil War, 1917—1921
- The Russian Revolution: A New History
