= Yinchuan Township, Heilongjiang =

Yinchuan Township 银川乡
- Township
- Location in Heilongjiang Yinchuan Township (China)
- Coordinates: 48°11′29″N 134°2′47″E
- Country: People's Republic of China
- Province: Heilongjiang
- Prefecture-level city: Jiamusi
- County-level city: Tongjiang
- Time zone: UTC+8 (China Standard)

Yinchuan Township (simplified Chinese: 银川乡; traditional Chinese: 銀川鄉; pinyin: Yínchuān Xiāng) is a township under the administration of Tongjiang, Heilongjiang, China. As of 2018, it has 5 villages under its administration.
