= Songjiang Province =

Province of the Republic of China

Binjiang Province (1934–1949) Songjiang Province (1945–1954) 濱江省 (1934–1945) 松江省 (1945–1954)
- Province of the Manchukuo (1934–1945); Province of the Republic of China (1945–1948); Province of the People's Republic of China (1948–1954)
- 1934–1954
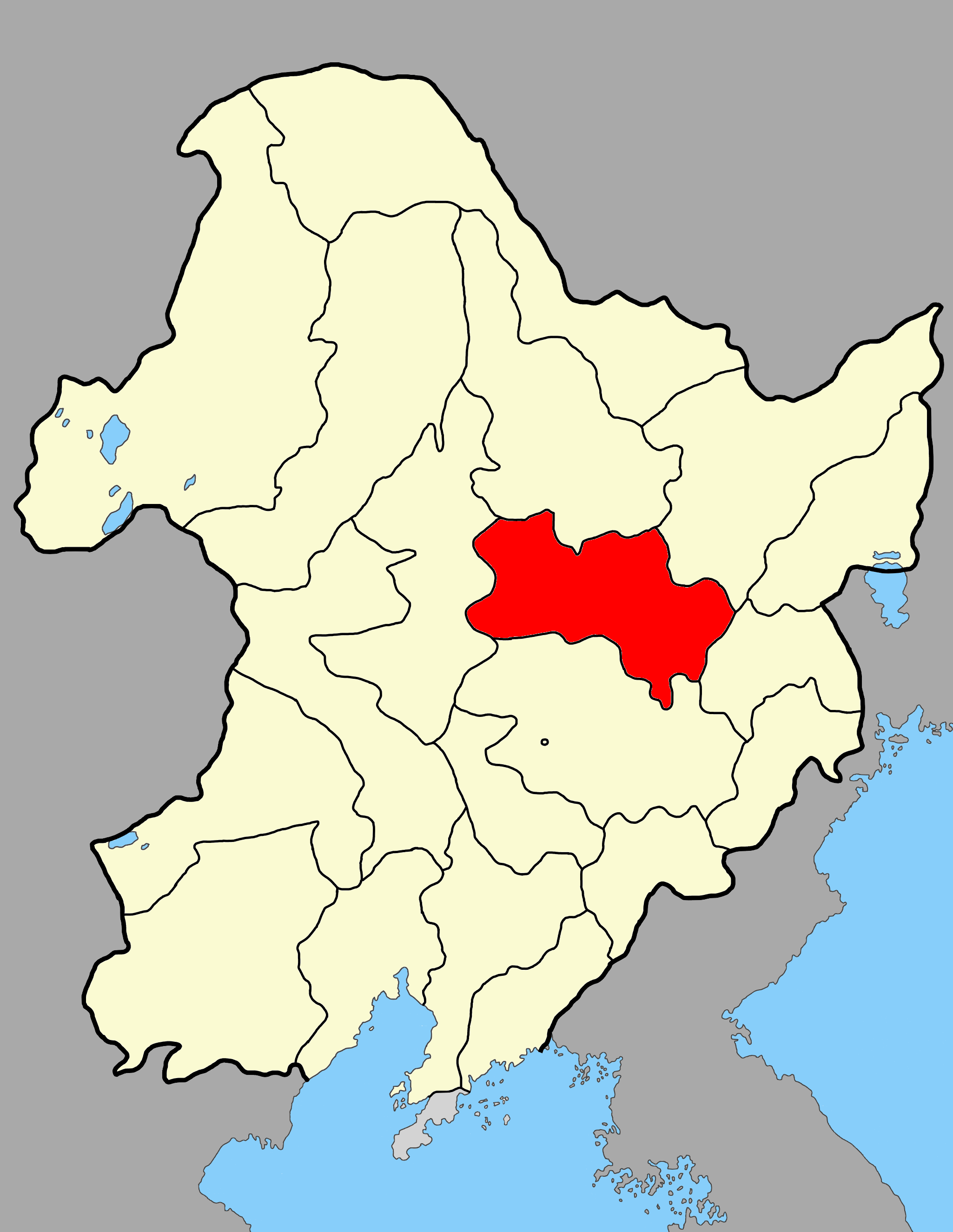
- Map of Binjiang within Manchukuo

- Map of Songjiang within the ROC
- Capital: Harbin (1934–1945); Mutankiang (1945–1954)
- Area
  - 1947: 85,273 km^{2} (32,924 sq mi)
- Population
  - 1947: 2,542,256
- History
  - Established: 1934
  - Disestablished: 1954
Preceded by	Succeeded by
Heilongjiang; Jilin	Heilongjiang
- Today part of: China ∟ Heilongjiang

Sungkiang or Songjiang (Chinese: 松江省; pinyin: Sōngjiāng Shěng; Wade–Giles: Sung-chiang Sheng; lit. 'Song(hua) River') was a province (c.32,000 sq mi/82,880 km^{2}) of the Republic of China. Mudanjiang was the capital. It was named for the Songhua River which flows through it. It was one of nine provinces created in Manchuria by the Chinese Nationalist government after World War II. Since the Nationalists never gained effective control of Manchuria, the province existed only on paper. It was bordered on the east by the USSR, and along part of the southern border ran the Nen (Nonni) and Songhua Rivers. In 1949 Hejiang was incorporated into Songjiang and in 1954, northern Songjiang was merged into Heilongjiang province and southern parts into Jilin province.

== See also ==
- Administrative divisions of the Republic of China
- Chinese irredentism § Taiwan
