= Battle of Lahasusu =

1929 Sino-Soviet battle

- Part of Sino-Soviet conflict (1929)
Date	12 October 1929
Location	Tongjiang, Songhua River
Result	Soviet victory

Belligerents
China	Soviet Union

Commanders and leaders
Shen Honglie; Li Du	Vasily Blyukher; Jēkabs Ozoliņš; Ivan Onufriyev; Jānis Kārkliņš

Units involved
Northeastern Army; Songhua River Flotilla; 1st Marine Battalion; 9th Infantry Brigade	Special Red Banner Far Eastern Army; 2nd Priamur Rifle Division; 40th Independent Light Bomber Aviation Squadron; Amur Military Flotilla; 68th Independent River Hydroaviation Detachment

Strength
Naval forces: 3 river gunboats; 4 armed steam vessels; 1 floating battery (armed non-propelled barge) with 2 × 120 mm (4.7 in) guns; 1 speedboat; Some auxiliary vessels; Garrison of Lahasusu: c. 2,200 troops (Note: The figures are cited according to Soviet sources. According to statements by the Chinese side, the number of Chinese troops was c. 2,600, with up to 900 killed in action. However, Russian historian Aleksey Pastukhov believes these numbers were intentionally inflated to make the Soviet attack look more severe in the eyes of the international community under the Kellogg–Briand Pact.); 18 trench mortars; 12 machine guns; Coastal defence: 12 × 3 in (76 mm) field guns; 6 trench mortars; 6 machine guns	Naval forces: 4 river monitors; 4 river gunboats; 3 armoured motor gunboats; 1 minelayer; 2 minesweepers; Landing forces: 1,117 troops; 21 field guns; 48 heavy machine guns; 30 light machine guns; Close air support: 29 aircraft

Casualties and losses
1 river gunboat and 3 armed steam vessels lost; 2 river gunboats damaged; 1 floating battery, 4 barges, 2 motorboats, 10 field guns, 11 trench mortars, 10+ machine guns, and c. 300 rifles captured; c. 200 KIA, unknown number of WIA and MIA; 98 POWs (68 of them WIA)	1 river monitor and 1 river gunboat damaged; 5 KIA, 24 WIA

The Battle of Lahasusu was a riverine clash fought during the Sino-Soviet conflict of 1929 around the mouth of the Songhua River.

== Battle ==
The battle begun when the Soviet Amur Military Flotilla attacked the garrisoned city of Lahasusu from the river (Lahasusu is a Nanai toponym for Tongjiang, Heilongjiang).

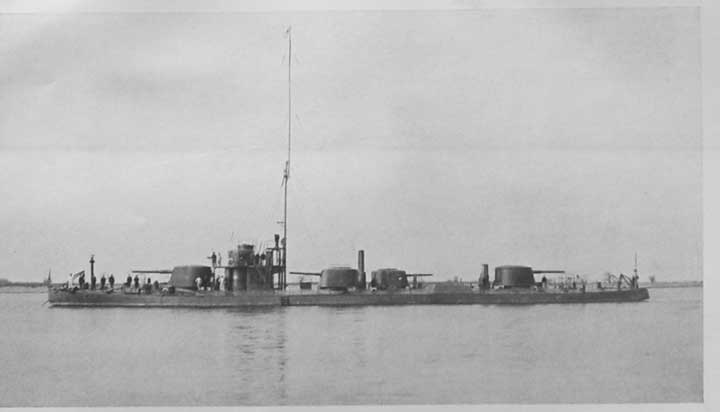
A Russian Shkval-class armoured turret river gunboat, 1911

The Soviet Shkval-class river monitors Lenin, Sverdlov, Sun Yat-Sen, and Krasny Vostok (originally classified as armoured turret river gunboats), and other minor units faced a Chinese flotilla of 11 vessels. The Chinese armed steamer Chiang Tai suffered a direct hit, while the monitor Lenin fire to the other armed steamer, Chiang Ping.

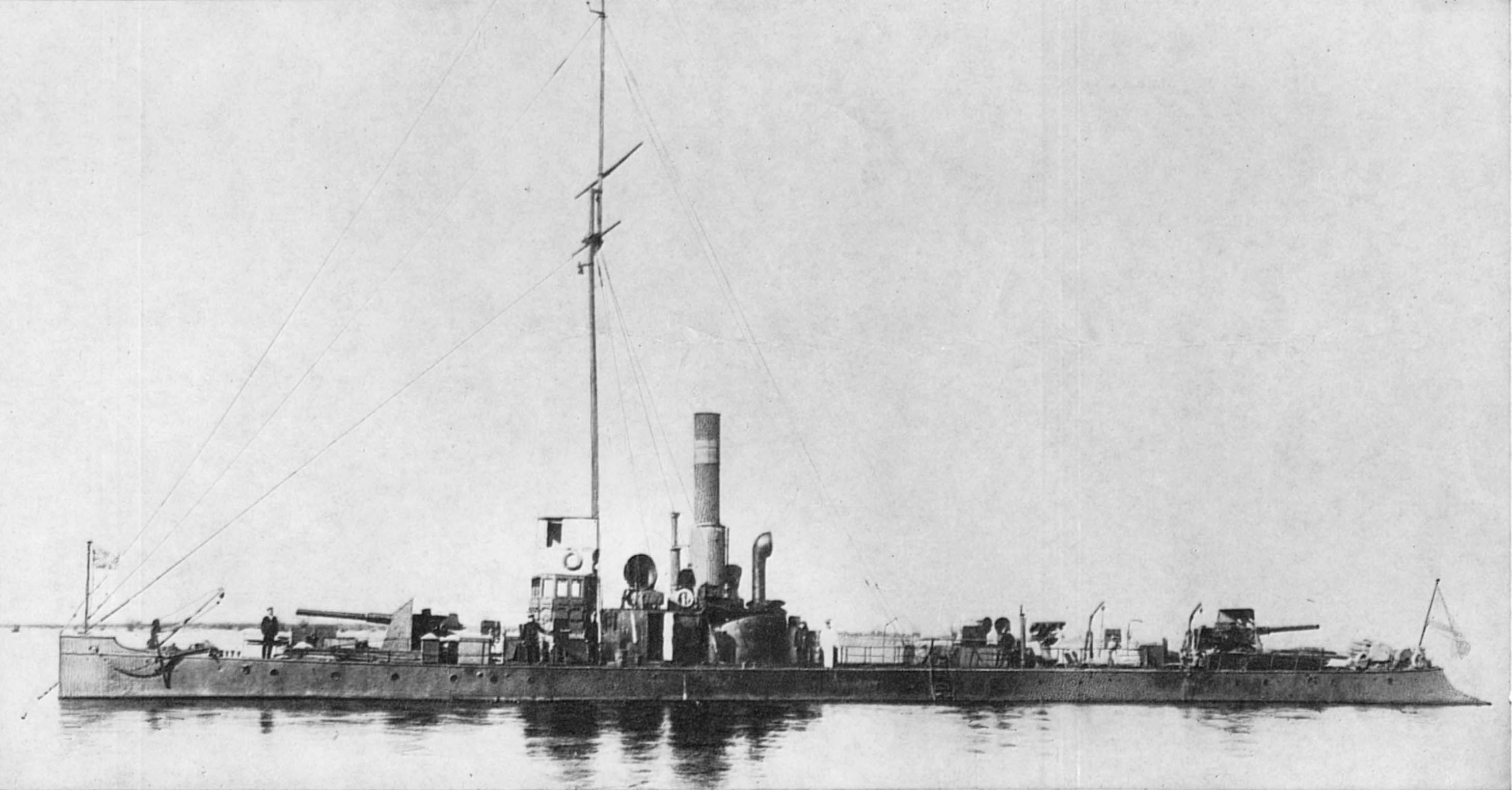
A Russian Kalmyk-class armoured river gunboat, pre-1917

The river gunboat Li Chi managed to score hits on the Soviet monitor Sun Yat-Sen and the Kalmyk-class armoured river gunboat Proletariy but was itself hit by Krasny Vostok, although it eventually managed to escape upriver.

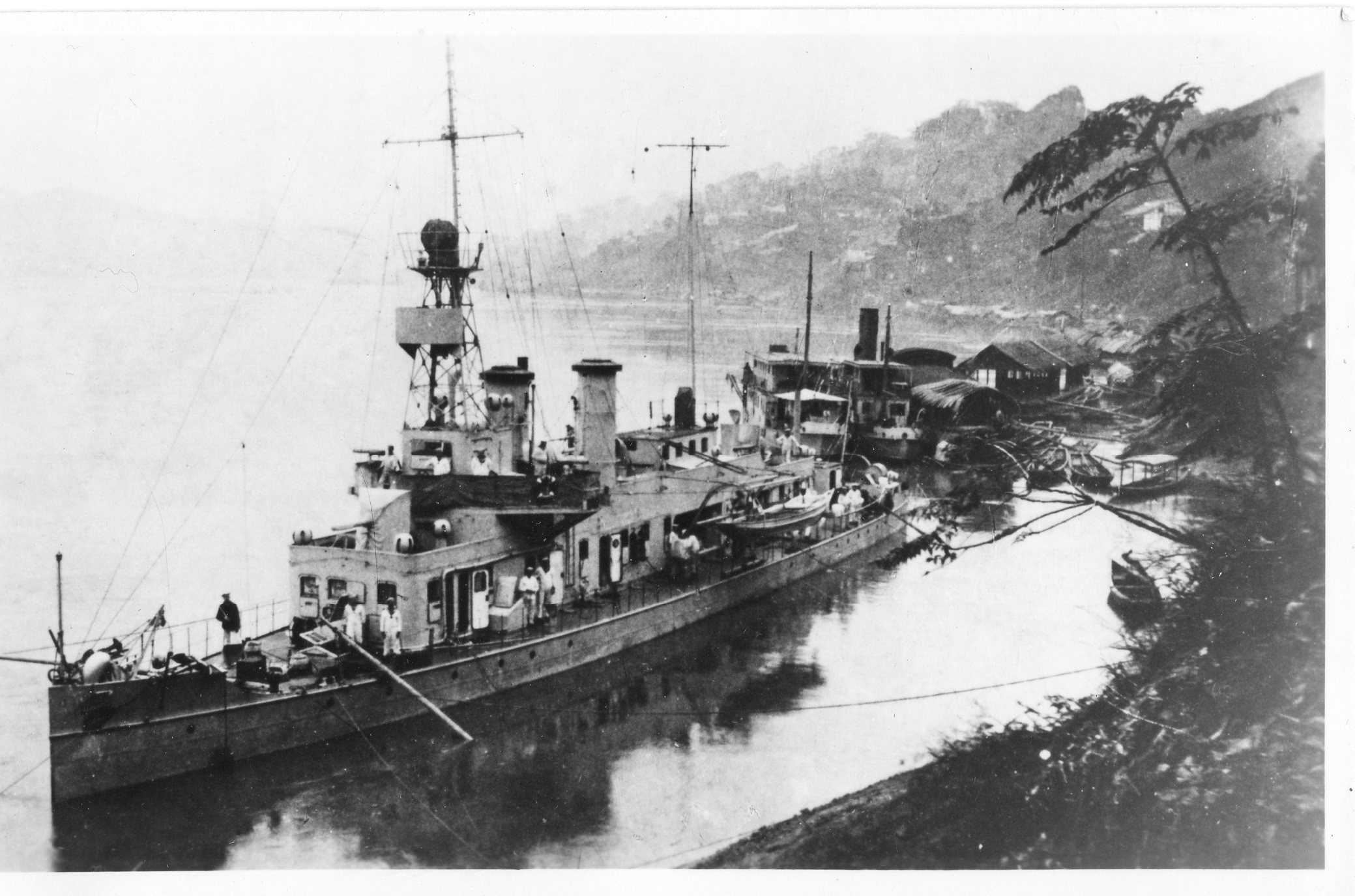
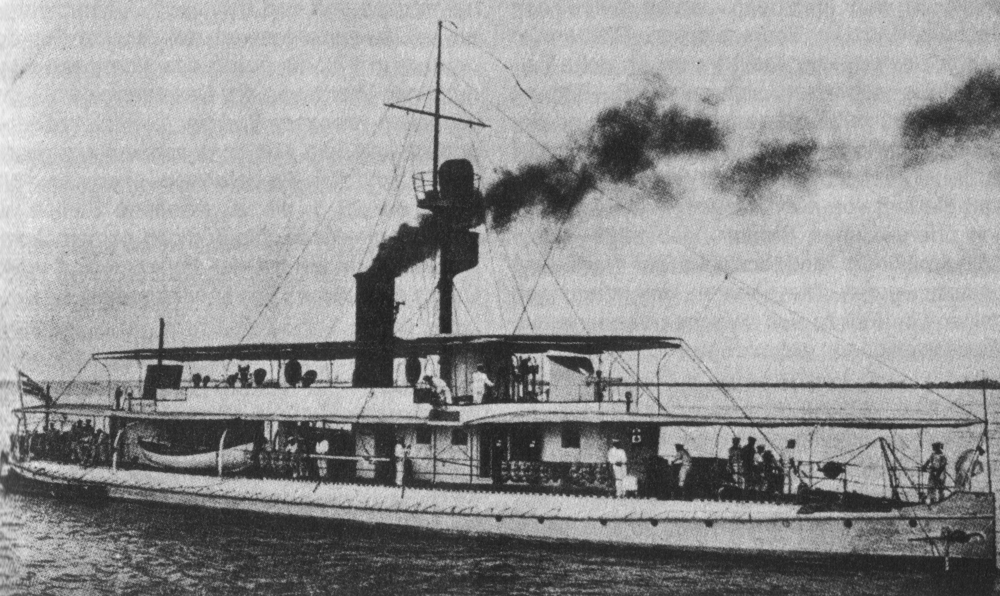
The German river gunboats SMS Otter (top) and Tsingtau-class SMS Vaterland (bottom) prior to 1914; later, while in Chinese service, both vessels were renamed either Li Chien and Li Sui, or vice versa, depending on the source, and fought in the Battle of Lahasusu

Older sources report different transliterations of the Chinese vessels, stating that the armed steamers Chiang Tai and Chiang An were sunk, followed by Chiang Ping and the river gunboat Li Chien (ex-German vessel), while the floating battery Tung Yi was abandoned and taken in tow by the Soviets. Four transport barges and two motorboats were also captured. While the Soviet side suffered casualties (five killed and 24 wounded), they lost no ships.

== Aftermath ==
With the river battle still ongoing, other Soviet vessels successfully landed troops close to Lahasusu and defeated the local garrison. As was common practice for the Soviets during this conflict, Soviet troops opened the grain stores of the city to distribute grain to the population to win their support.

It was a heavy defeat for the Chinese, who were forced to gather their defense at Fujin: there the rest of their naval force was destroyed on October 31 and November 1, 1929.
