= Former Residence of Zhang Wentian =

- 张闻天故居
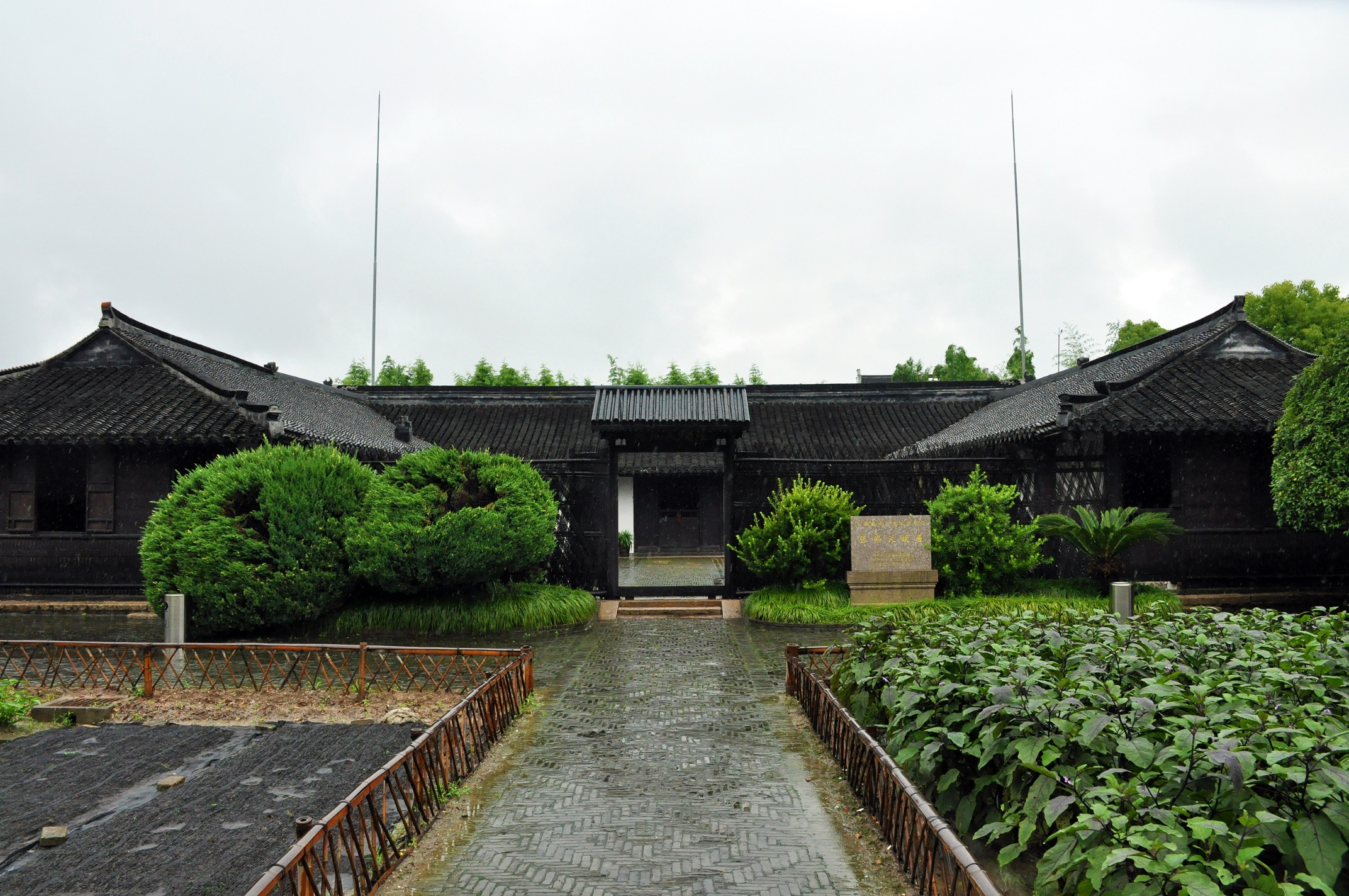
- A frontal view of the Former Residence of Zhang Wentian.

- Location within Shanghai

General information
- Type: Traditional folk houses
- Location: Pudong, Shanghai, China
- Coordinates: 31°08′15″N 121°46′12″E
- Completed: 19th century
- Opened: 1992
- Renovated: 1989
- Affiliation: Shanghai Municipal Government

Height
- Architectural: Chinese architecture

Technical details
- Material: Brick and wood
- Floor area: 495 m^{2} (5,330 sq ft)
- Grounds: 686 m^{2} (7,380 sq ft)

The Former Residence of Zhang Wentian (simplified Chinese: 张闻天故居; traditional Chinese: 張聞天故居; pinyin: Zhāng Wéntiān Gùjū) is the birthplace and childhood home of Zhang Wentian, the 4th General Secretary of the Central Committee of the Chinese Communist Party. It is situated in the Pudong New Area of Shanghai. It occupies a building area of 495-square-metre (5,330 sq ft) and the total area of 686-square-metre (7,380 sq ft).

== History ==
The traditional folk house style residence was built by Zhang Wentian's ancestors in the reign of Guangxu Emperor of the Qing dynasty.

On August 30, 1900, Zhang Wentian was born in here and spent his early years between 1900 and 1932, while he went to the Jiangxi-Fujian Soviet.

The former residence became dilapidated for neglect in the 1980s.

On September 19, 1985, it was inscribed to the Shanghai Municipal Cultural Preservation Unit List by the Shanghai Municipal Government.

In September 1986, Chen Yun, the then 6th First Secretary of the Central Commission for Discipline Inspection, inscribed the plaque "Former Residence of Zhang Wentian" to the former residence.

Renovation of the former residence, commenced in February 1989 and was completed in September that same year.

It was officially opened to the public in 1992.

In 2001, it was listed among the fifth group of "Major National Historical and Cultural Sites in Shanghai" by the State Council of China.

In 2004, it was listed as a National Patriotic Education Base by the Publicity Department of the Chinese Communist Party.
