= Zhang Wentian =

Chinese politician (1900–1976)

- 张闻天
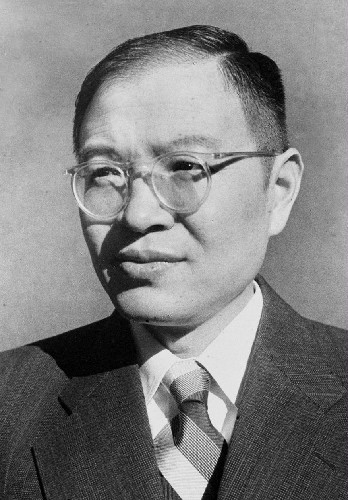
- Zhang in 1951

General Secretary of the Chinese Communist Party
- In office 17 January 1935 – 20 March 1943
- Preceded by: Bo Gu
- Succeeded by: Mao Zedong (as Chairman)

Head of the Publicity Department of the Chinese Communist Party
- In office April 1931 – December 1934
- Preceded by: Shen Zemin
- Succeeded by: Wu Liangping
- In office July 1937 – December 1942
- Preceded by: Wu Liangping
- Succeeded by: Lu Dingyi

Vice Minister of Foreign Affairs
- In office December 1954 – November 1960
- Minister: Zhou Enlai

Ambassador of China to the Soviet Union
- In office April 1951 – January 1955
- Preceded by: Wang Jiaxiang
- Succeeded by: Liu Xiao

Chairman of the Council of People's Commissars of the Chinese Soviet Republic
- In office 10 October 1934 – 6 September 1937
- Preceded by: Mao Zedong
- Succeeded by: Position abolished

Personal details
- Born: 30 August 1900 Nanhui, Shanghai, China
- Died: 1 July 1976 (aged 75) Wuxi, Jiangsu, China
- Party: Chinese Communist Party
- Education: University of California, Berkeley, Moscow Sun Yat-sen University

Zhang Wentian (Note: simplified Chinese: 张闻天; traditional Chinese: 張聞天; pinyin: Zhāng Wéntiān; Wade–Giles: Chang Wen-t'ien; 30 August 1900 – 1 July 1976), nom de guerre Luo Fu (Chinese: 洛甫; Wade–Giles: Lo Fu) (30 August 1900 – 1 July 1976) was a Chinese politician who was a high-ranking leader of the Chinese Communist Party (CCP).

Born in Nanhui, he attended the Hohai Civil Engineering School in Nanjing and spent a year at the University of California. He later joined the CCP in 1925 and was sent to study at Sun Yat-sen University in Moscow, from 1926 to 1930. He was a member of the group known as the 28 Bolsheviks, but switched to supporting Mao Zedong during the Long March. He was General Secretary of the Chinese Communist Party from 1935 to 1943, when the post was abolished.

He was First Vice Minister of Foreign Affairs of the People's Republic of China from December 1954 to November 1960. He was a participant of the Long March, and later served as an ambassador to the Soviet Union from April 1951 to January 1955. At the Lushan Conference in 1959 he supported Peng Dehuai and lost power along with Peng. During the Cultural Revolution he was attacked as an ally of Peng and Liu Shaoqi; he was rehabilitated by Deng Xiaoping after Mao's death.

== Life ==
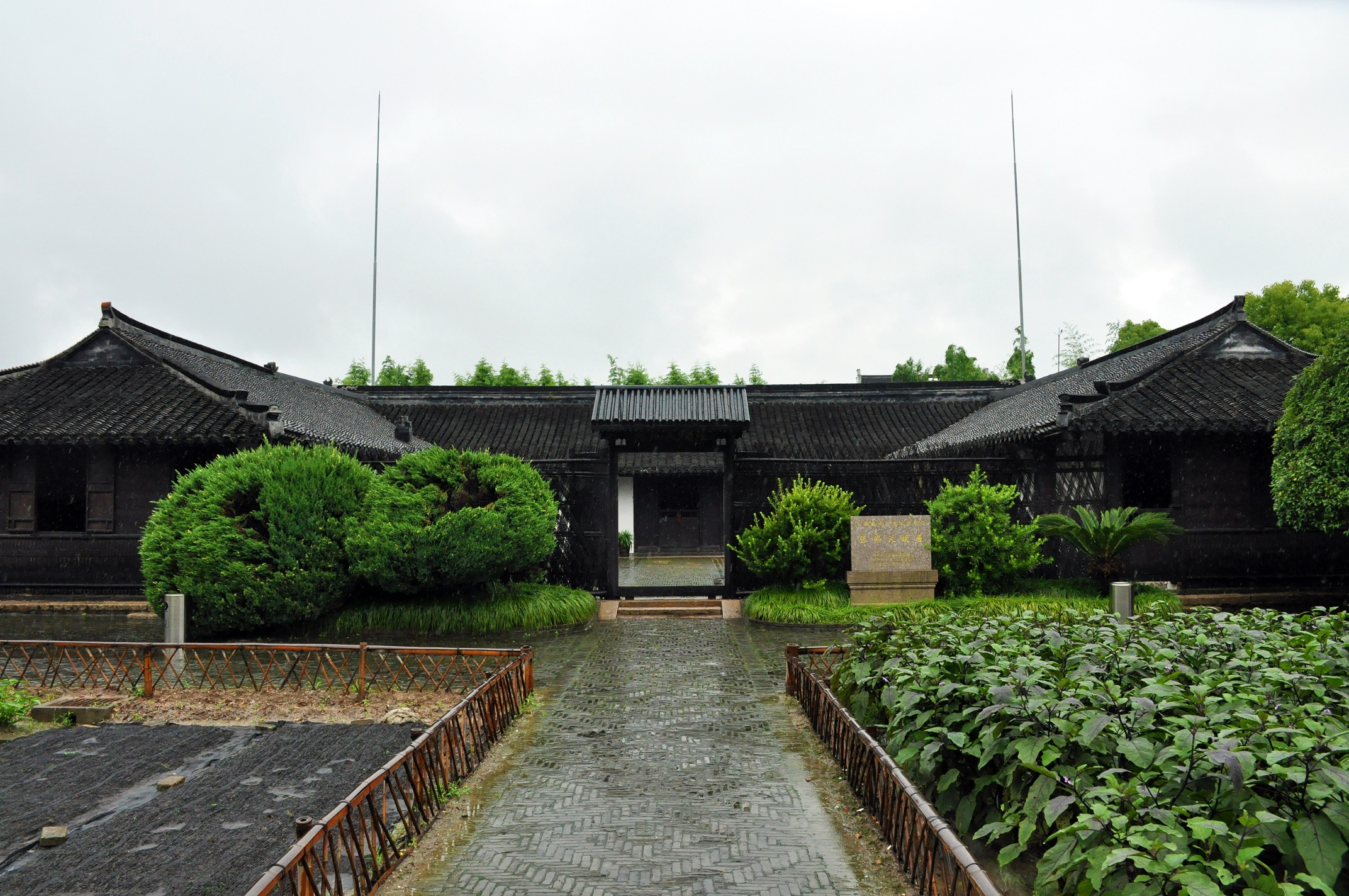
The Former Residence of Zhang Wentian, where he lived between his birth in 1900 and 1932, when he went to the Jiangxi-Fujian Soviet.

=== Early life ===
On 30 August 1900, Zhang Wentian was born in Deng San Village, Nanhui, Jiangsu Province. Zhang's ancestors migrated to Pudong from Qinghe County to avoid the war. His grandfather Zhang Xiangfu and father Zhang Qimei were farmers, and his mother Jin Tianhua had attended a private school. Zhang Wentian was the eldest son of the family. In 1915, he was admitted to the Jiangsu Provincial Fisheries School (Wusong Fisheries School). After studying for two years, he decided to transfer because he could not physically get used to the studying environment there. In 1917, he entered the Hohai Civil Engineering School. At this point, Zhang Wentian became exposed to the Chen Duxiu's journal New Youth, and started to lean toward the idea of Bolshevik revolution.

After the outbreak of the May Fourth Movement in 1919, Zhang Wentian participated in student movements and began to engage himself in literary creation and translation. In July 1920, Zhang Wentian and his classmate Shen Zemin went to study in Japan. They studied Japanese, philosophy and other texts in social sciences. In January 1921, Zhang Wentian returned to China, and became an editor for Zhonghua Book Company, working with colleagues Zuo Shunsheng, Tian Han, Li Da, He Shuheng. On January 5, 1922, Zhang Wentian published "China's Source of Chaos and Its Solution(中国底乱源及其解决)". The article stated: "We are so uneasy about this unreasonable society, but what methods should we use to transform it? What should it be transformed into? Nonresistance? Resistance? Anarchism? Socialism? Like the water flowing in the river, it constantly troubles me. However, life cannot continue without a decision. Then, naturally we cannot but go down the socialist road." In August, Zhang Wentian went to study in University of California, Berkeley at his own expense. He took several courses, but was not formally enrolled.

Zhang also participated in the Young China Association, a patriotic cultural society that promoted modernization and reform among Chinese students in the early 1920s.

Zhang Wentian returned home in January 1924, continuing his work as an editor for to Zhonghua Book Company. In October 1924, Zhang Wentian received an invitation from the Juvenile Chinese Society Chengdu branch and took up the job as an English teacher at the Second Chongqing Women's Normal School with colleagues Xiao Chu'nu and Yang Angong. In May 1925, Zhang Wentian left Sichuan and returned to Shanghai with Xiao Chunü to propagate revolutionary ideas. In June, Zhang Wentian was introduced by Shen Zemin and Dong Yixiang to join the Chinese Communist Party. He went to Moscow to study at Sun Yat-sen University in October.

While Zhang was studying and teaching in Moscow between 1925 and 1930, Nikolai Bukharin was still in power. Zhang learned about Bukarin's theory of allowing private rural economy through supply and marketing cooperatives, and this would later deeply influence Zhang's own policy perspectives. Zhang was much respected in the CCP circle for his thorough knowledge of Bukharin, in addition to Marxism and Leninism.

In early 1928, some members of the Chinese Communist Party branch at Sun Yat-sen University were dissatisfied with the work of the school branch office. The school branch office ignored the leadership of the party and sought to restructure the Communist Party branch. The power struggle between the two factions in Moscow reached its peak in the summer of 1928, and a ten-day meeting was held to discuss the workings of the school office. The secretary of the Soviet Communist Party Committee supported the school branch office. Despite the opposition from majority of students, under the support of minority factions including Bo Gu and others, the vote was passed to support the school branch office. After the meeting, the proud supporters of the school branch office were given the nickname "28 Bolsheviks" by the oppositional faction, and Zhang Wentian was one of them.

On 19 May 1930, Zhang Wentian published "On the Two Lines of Struggle." The article pointed out that the Communist Party not only needs to oppose the right-wing within the party, but also needs to oppose the left-wing inside the party. This article was considered to be directed against Li Lisan and his extremism which later came to be known as "Li Lisan line".

=== The First Chinese Civil War (1927-1937) ===
In February 1931, Zhang Wentian returned to Shanghai, and soon served as the Minister of Publicity Department of the CCP Central Committee. In September of the same year, the provisional central political bureau was established by Bo Gu, Zhang Wentian, Lu Futan, Li Zhusheng, Kang Sheng, Chen Yun, Huang Ping, Liu Shaoqi, Wang Yun Cheng and other nine; Bo Gu, Zhang Wentian, Lu Futan as the Standing Committee. After the outbreak of January 28 Incident in 1932, Zhang Wentian was disturbed by the class struggle mode of thinking, which denounced the Nineteenth Route Army generals as reactionary and counter-revolutionary "anti-Japanese warlords". He pointed out that the Party's strategy is "supporting the soldiers to struggle against Japan automatically and to oppose their superiors, using every opportunity to expose the deceptions of these officials" and making them to think that "they must kill their reactionary superiors in order to win the war."

In December 1932, the Shanghai underground party was once again destroyed. Lu Futan and others in Politburo Standing Committee were arrested, resulting in Zhang Wentian, Chen Yun and others to almost get arrested. In January 1933, Zhang Wentian moved to the Central Soviet Area with the temporary central government, and served as the Minister of the Central Bureau of the Soviet Union, and as the chairman of Ruijin Workers and Peasants Democratic Government.

At that time, the Nationalist Government was preparing for the Fourth Encirclement Campaign against the Jiangxi Soviet. Chiang Kai-shek personally commanded the attack. Bo Gu held a meeting of the Central Committee of the Chinese Communist Party, arguing that they should stick to their positions. This proposal has been opposed by the Chinese Communist Party Fujian Provincial Party Secretary Luo Ming, who said that they should continue the guerrilla warfare since people do not have the strength to resist long-term warfare. Luo Ming pointed out straightforwardly that the resolution of the Central Bureau was an "empty preaching". Bo Gu was enraged and wrote "The Central Bureau's position about Decisions from Fujian Provincial Committee," in which he accused Luo Ming of "opportunism" (Luo Ming doctrine), followed by the launching of anti-Luo Ming campaign. Many grassroots and front-line cadres involved were dismissed from their posts.

On 18 February 1933, Zhang Wentian published an article entitled "What is the opportunist line of Comrade Luo Ming" published in the Struggle, a bulletin for the Central Committee of the Chinese Communist Party. Since then, Bo Gu criticised "Jiangxi Luo Ming line," and Zhang Wentian also published "Luo Ming line in Jiangxi," "Fire toward the Opportunism of the Right-wing" and other articles to support Bo Gu's action. Communist cadre including Zhang Dingcheng, Liu Xiao, Deng Xiaoping, Mao Zedong, Xie Weijun, and He Shushing were criticised as followers of the "Luo Ming line".

In January 1934, Zhang Wentian was elected member of the Central Political Bureau and secretary of the Central Committee of the Fifth Plenary Session of the Sixth CCP Central Committee. In February, he was elected as the Chairman of Central Government People's Committee. After the fall of Guangchang, Zhang Wentian criticized the military command of Bo Gu, Li De (Otto Braun) and others at the first meeting of the Central Military Commission, and began to be estranged from them. In August 1934, the authorities of the Central Soviet area stationed at Shazhou Dam was bombed by the Kuomintang, and they were forced to relocate to Ruijin. Since then, Zhang Wentian began to communicate with Mao Zedong and became close to him.

In October 1934, Zhang Wentian participated in the Long March with Mao Zedong and Wang Jiaxiang. Three people communicated many times during the march on the way and formed an alliance against Bo Gu and Li De. On 15 January 1935, the First Red Army occupied Zunyi, Guizhou during the Long March, and held a meeting. At the meeting, Bo Gu took the lead in making a report to discuss the errors of military command during the fifth anti-encirclement campaign, but mainly asserted that the difficulties were unavoidable due to circumstances. Zhou Enlai then made a deputy report, saying that it was the tactical errors made by the military command, and admitted responsibility. It was followed by Zhang Wentian's report opposing the Central Committee's military strategy that solely focused on defense. Then, Mao Zedong made a long speech, pointing out that the cause of serious loss and defeat in the fifth anti-encirclement campaign was due to the military's simple defense line, and this was manifest in the adventurism during the attack, the conservatism during the defense, and conservatism during the sortie. Mao Zedong had planned this outline in advance with Wang Jiaxiang and Zhang Wentian. Immediately, Wang Jiaxiang, Zhu De, Liu Shaoqi expressed agreement. The meeting was held for three days, and the final decision was to dismiss the leadership of Bo Gu, Li De, and Zhou Enlai. Mao Zedong was co-opted onto the standing committee of the CCP Central Committee Political Bureau by military commanders Zhu De and Zhou Enlai, and was also restored to the position as the military commander of the Red Army.

On 5 February, the Red Army arrived in Bijie, and held a Politburo meeting here. Zhang Wentian replaced Bo Gu as the CCP Central Committee General Secretary. On 12 May, Zhang Wentian presided over the Huili Meeting. After the First and Fourth Red Army joined forces in June 1935, Zhang Wentian supported Mao Zedong's decision to go up north and opposed Zhang Guotao's plan to go south.

In 1936, the Red Army carried out the failed eastern and western expedition (western route army). During this period, Zhang Wentian, Mao Zedong, and Zhou Enlai cooperated to push the anti-Japanese national united front into the CCP's focus. After the outbreak of Xi'an Incident in December, Zhang Wentian held a meeting to deal with the incident. At this meeting, Mao Zedong proposed to "put Chiang on trial", "get rid of Chiang", and Zhang Wentian advocated "not to take the opposite policy with Nanjing, not to organise opposition against Nanjing", "to strive to gain legitimacy of the Nanjing government and join forces with anti-Chiang troops". In the end, under the pressure from Stalin, the Xian Incident was peacefully resolved. In January 1937, Zhang Wentian secretly went to Xian to discuss matters with Zhou Enlai, Bo Gu and others.

=== Second Sino-Japanese War ===
After the full-scale Sino-Japanese War broke out in China in August 1937, the CCP Central Committee held a Political Bureau meeting in Fengjia Village, Luochuan, Shaanxi Province. Zhang Wentian presided over the meeting and made an analytic report on the political situation both at home and abroad. He put forward a proposal of ten major of resistance against Japan and rejected national defeatism.

By the end of November 1937, Wang Ming, Chen Yun and Kang Sheng returned to Yan'an from Moscow. Zhang Wentian presided over the December Politburo meeting and made a report on "The Current Political Situation and the Task of the Party." At the meeting, the Central Committee decided that Zhang Wentian should manage the Party, Mao Zedong manage the army, Wang Ming manage the United Front, forming a triumvirate layout. In 1938, Zhang Wentian opposed the marriage of Mao Zedong and Jiang Qing.

After the 6th Plenary Session of the 6th Central Committee of the Chinese Communist Party, Zhang Wentian withdrew from the position of supreme leader and went on to being responsible for propaganda work and cadre education as the Minister of the CCP Central Committee and Central Publicity Department.

In 1941, Communist-controlled areas were facing embargo from the Kuomintang and attacks by the Imperial Japanese Army. The economy was on the verge of collapse as a result, affecting the CCP's popularity among peasants. Zhang Wentian was sent down to Shanxi in order to investigate how to increase the production of agricultural output and improve peasants' livelihood. He proposed providing economic incentives to rich peasants to boost commerce, but his report was suppressed as it went against Mao Zedong's plan for organising collective farms and mutual aid teams.

In February 1942, Mao Zedong launched the Yan'an Rectification Movement. When Zhang Wentian returned to Yan'an, he was forced to repeatedly criticise himself and was not able to work on economic problems.

In 1943, the post of General Secretary was abolished.

In June 1945, at the Seventh Congress of the CCP in Yan'an, Zhang was elected a member of the Political Bureau of the CCP Central Committee, and served as director of the Central Political Research Office.

Zhang remained a member of the Politburo, but ranked 12th of 13 in the 7th Politburo and reduced to Alternate Member in the 8th Politburo.

=== The Second Chinese Civil War (1946-1949) ===
After the Second Sino-Japanese War, Zhang Wentian volunteered to go to the northeast for local work. After regaining trust from Mao Zedong after continuous self-criticisms, Zhang was sent to Hejiang province in northeast China to take charge of it. On October 22, 1945, Zhang Wentian and Gao Gang, Li Fuchun, Wang Heshou, Kai Feng, Chen Guang and Zhu Rui took a plane from the U.S. mediation team to Handan, and arrived in Shenyang on 22 November. Afterwards, Zhang Wentian was sent to North Manchuria. Under the auspices of Chen Yun, he participated in drafting a telegram and sending it to the Central Committee jointly with Chen Yun and Gao Gang. Zhang suggested that the CCP's strategic principle in northeast should be to disperse the armed forces and cadres into the vast rural areas and small to medium-sized cities as soon as possible, and establish a consolidated base instead of concentrating too much attention on big cities. In December, Zhang Wentian served as secretary of the CCP Hejiang Provincial Party Committee. Because of the large number of bandits in Hejiang Province at the time, Zhang Wentian first conducted a social investigation in Ning'an County.

In Hejiang, he has presided over the work of building political power in Hejiang and suppressing bandits and land reform, and has also served as political commissar of Hejiang Military Region. Between 1947 and 1948, radical land reforms swept northeast China, followed by collective-style mutual aid teams. However, these aid teams soon collapsed, creating chaos in the rural areas. There was a "leftist" tendency in the land reform movement and other excessive violence taking place. In response, Zhang Wentian ordered newspapers in Hejiang area not to reproduce the experience of violent land reform, and to protect Hejiang's commerce and industry, and Zhang drafted the "Directive on the Protection of Business and Industry in Distinguishing the Land. Zhang strongly objected to forceful collectivisation and proposed to the Party that the emphasis should be in encouraging rural production, rather than class struggle.

In May 1948, Zhang Wentian served as a minister of the Standing Committee and Organisation Department of the Northeast Bureau of the CCP Central Committee and deputy director of the Northeast Financial and Economic Committee. During this period, Zhang Wentian drafted the "Outline on the Basic Principles of Economic Structure and Economic Development in Northeast China" and put forward the idea of "five kinds of economic components". The Outline was affirmed by Mao Zedong and was forwarded to the whole party as a guideline for the economic development of all the liberated areas. In April, he took up the job as the secretary of Liaodong Provincial Party Committee, Liaodong Military District Political Committee to organize the increase of production and to improve people's lives.

=== After the founding of the PRC ===
Since earlier periods of the CCP, Mao Zedong's emphasis on collective farms as the correct form of rural socialism differed from Liu Shaoqi and Zhang Wentian's line of supporting the supply and marketing cooperative (SMCs). Gao Gang was a prominent leftist and a staunch supporter of Stalin's and Mao's model of bolstering collectivisation. Zhang Wentian clashed with Gao Gang when Zhang strongly criticised the idea of organising all peasants into mutual aid teams. Soon afterwards, the CCP suddenly appointed Zhang as a Chinese delegate to the United Nations without consulting him. Zhang reluctantly accepted the post and repeatedly made pleas to return to his job in the economic sector, but they were ignored. In April 1951, Zhang Wentian was appointed as Ambassador of China to the Soviet Union. Zhang Wentian paid attention to studying international issues and actively submitted the analysis and policy proposals to the Central Government. For instance, the report on the first armistice negotiations in the Korean War was put forward in 1951, and was valued by the Central Government. In 1953, during his conversation with Wu Lengxi of Xinhua news agency, Zhang talked about the weakness and failures of the Soviet collectivisation system and warned that China should not blindly copy the Soviet model. In January 1955, Zhang Wentian returned to China and was appointed the first deputy minister of foreign affairs of the People's Republic of China to assist Zhou Enlai in diplomatic affairs. In September 1956, the 8th National Congress of the Chinese Communist Party elected Zhang Wentian as alternate member of the Political Bureau of the CCP Central Committee.

In 1959, Zhang Wentian attended the Lushan Conference. On 14 July, Vice Chairman of the Central Military Commission and Vice Minister of the State Council and Minister of National Defense Peng Dehuai wrote a letter to Chairman Mao Zedong. In the letter, he first affirmed that the principles of the Great Leap forward was correct. However, Peng subsequently pointed out the problems of the Great Leap Forward, "Now looking back, the basic development in 1958 was overly rapid and a bit too much. In the year 1959, not only the pace could not be slowed down, nor was it properly controlled, and continuing the Great Leap Forward did not lead to immediate regulation of imbalances, but only added new temporary difficulties." He also pointed out that the lack of democracy and the cult of personality were the root causes of all these evils. On 19 July, Huang Kecheng, chief advisor of the Chinese People's Liberation Army, and Zhou Xiaozhou, the first secretary of the CCP Hunan Provincial Committee, spoke in support of Peng Dehuai. On 21 July, Zhang Wentian made a speech for three hours and used more precise theoretical terms to criticize the leftist mistakes of the Great Leap Forward and the People's commune. He advocated the promotion of democracy within the party and supported Peng Dehuai. Subsequently, Mao Zedong, who originally advocated "rectification of the left," turned to criticise the "Peng Dehuai Anti-Party Group". Zhang Wentian was classified by Mao Zedong as a "Right opportunist" element and a member of "Peng Dehuai Anti-Party Group". After the meeting, "Anti-Rightist Movement" was launched again. Zhang Wentian was further criticized at the National Foreign Affairs Conference and was removed from the post of deputy minister of foreign affairs.

On 12 November 1960, he took up the job as a researcher for the Institute of Economics at Department of Philosophy and Social Sciences in Chinese Academy of Sciences, and dealt with the research on socialist economic development theories. He went to Jiangsu, Zhejiang, Shanghai, and Hunan to conduct a social survey. After the survey was over, he wrote a report "Suggestions on Market Trade". During the Eighth Plenary Session of the Eighth Central Committee, Mao Zedong again criticised Peng Dehuai, Zhang Wentian, Xi Zhongxun and others. After the meeting, Zhang Wentian was deprived of the right to participate in all Central Committee's meetings and read any document from the Central Government. Afterwards, Zhang Wentian again put forward "A Duality of Production Relations Theory". On 1 October, Zhang Wentian took part in the celebration of the National Day and went up to the Tiananmen Gate Tower with Mao Zedong to have a conversation.

During the Cultural Revolution, Zhang Wentian was persecuted and received criticism with Peng Dehuai. From 17 May 1968, Zhang Wentian was under house arrest in his residence. During the period, Zhang Wentian and his wife Liu Ying were separated. In order to obtain material unfavourable to Liu Shaoqi, Kang Sheng asked Zhang Wentian to testify on Liu Shaoqi's charge on "61 Traitors Group", but Zhang Wentian did not give in to the pressure. On 24 October 1969, Zhang Wentian was released to Zhaoqing, Guangdong with his family.

Zhang Wentian started to write a series of theoretical essays that were later referred to as the "Zhaoqing Manuscript." He criticised the ultra-leftist line and errors of the Cultural Revolution and elaborated on the views on the basic issues of China's socialist construction. In his writing, Zhang Wentian wrote that the foremost task of socialist society is to develop productive forces, and "it is absurd to curse the principle of struggle for the material interests of the people as a revisionist, that is to say, unacceptable confusion and deceit!" About the Cultural Revolution, he thought that exaggerating the internal contradictions among the people as the contradiction between the enemy and myself "caused great harm to the Party." It poses a serious disruption to the Party "to have the comrades who hold different opinions are framed as 'agents of the bourgeoisie within the party,' because it further confuses the enemy and ourselves." In May 1972, the CCP Central Committee decided to restore the wages of Zhang Wentian and his wife. Since then, Zhang Wentian repeatedly asked to return to Beijing but was not approved. In August 1975, Zhang Wentian moved to Wuxi.

On 1 July 1976, Zhang Wentian died in Wuxi, Jiangsu, due to a heart disease at the age of 75. On 25 August 1979, the CCP Central Committee held a memorial service to Zhang Wentian in the Great Hall of the People in Beijing.

== Evaluation ==
In the mainstream historiography of the Chinese Communist Party, Zhang is regarded as a leader of the Central Committee of the Chinese Communist Party who made a significant contribution to the CCP. During the Yan'an period, Mao Zedong once remarked: "Zhang Wentian was an influential figure in the Central Soviet Area, not only because of his status and position, but also for his own qualities." On 25 August 1979, during the memorial held for Zhang Wentian by the CCP Central Committee in the Great Hall of the People in Beijing, Deng Xiaoping wrote a eulogy stating that Zhang Wentian was "an outstanding Party member and an important leader of our party for a fairly long period of time." The next day People's Daily published a news that Zhang Wentian was "an outstanding party member of the Chinese Communist Party and an older generation of proletarian revolutionaries." Throughout his political career, he made criticism whenever overt leftist tendency arose within the Party. Even though his adherence to Bukharin's interpretation of Lenin's "Cooperative Plan" set himself against Mao Zedong, who followed Stalin's way of collectivisation, and caused constant fluctuations in terms of his political career, Zhang never ceased to speak up. He also devoted his entire life studying the economic issues. Jiang Zemin said in his letter to Zhang Wentian's wife Liu Ying in August 1990, "With his firm unwavering belief in communism, his generous heart as a politician and the cautious demeanour as a scholar, he adhered to the truth for the benefit of the people. His noble character to correct the errors, he always deserves to be learned by all of us in his practical, practical, humble, prudent and simple style of work."

== See also ==
- Former Residence of Zhang Wentian

== Notes ==
Political offices
| Preceded by Mao Zedong | Chairman of the Council of People's Commissars of the Chinese Soviet Republic; 1934 | Chinese Soviet Republic disbanded |
Party political offices
| Preceded by Shen Zemin | Head of the CCP Central Publicity Department; 1931–1934 | Succeeded by Wu Liangping |
| Preceded by Bo Gu | General Secretary of the Chinese Communist Party; 1935–1945 | Succeeded by Deng Xiaoping; Abolished until 1954 |
| Preceded by Wu Liangping | Head of the CCP Central Publicity Department; 1937–1943 | Succeeded by Lu Dingyi |
