= Xiangyang, Tongjiang, Heilongjiang =

Xiangyang 向阳镇
- Town
- Location in Heilongjiang
- Coordinates: 47°36′20″N 132°30′42″E
- Country: People's Republic of China
- Province: Heilongjiang
- Prefecture-level city: Jiamusi
- County-level city: Tongjiang
- Time zone: UTC+8 (China Standard)

Xiangyang (Chinese: 向阳) is a town of Tongjiang, Jiamusi, Heilongjiang, China. As of 2018, it has 10 villages under its administration.
