= Shen Zemin =

Chinese communist

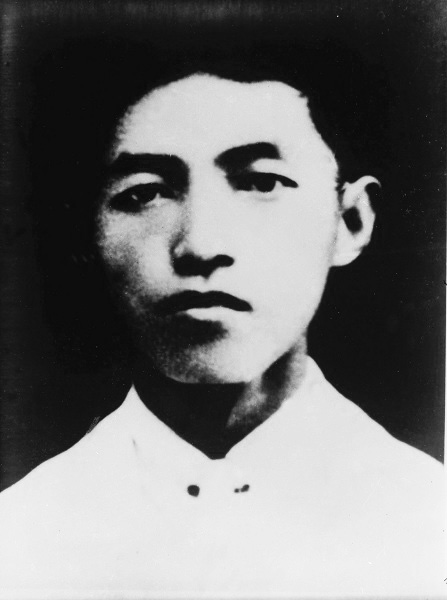
Shen Zemin

Shen Zemin (Chinese: 沈泽民; June 23, 1900 – November 20, 1933) was one of the earliest members of the Chinese Communist Party (CCP), elected to the 6th Central Committee of the Chinese Communist Party in 1931. He was the younger brother of the prominent novelist Mao Dun (Shen Yanbing) and a member of the 28 Bolsheviks. He was married to Zhang Qinqiu, one of the three female members of the 28 Bolsheviks.

== Early life ==
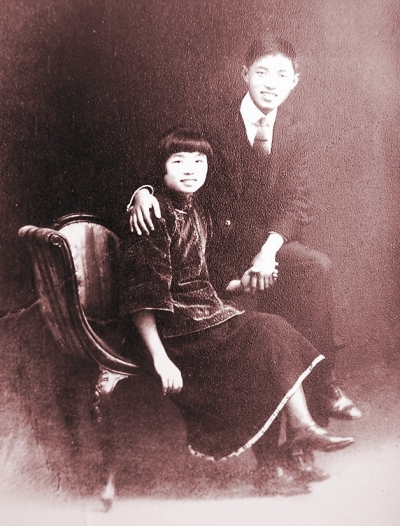
Wedding photo of Shen Zemin and Zhang Qinqiu

From 1916 to 1919, Shen Zemin attended school in Nanjing with Zhang Wentian, who became another member of the 28 Bolsheviks. He taught at the left-wing Shanghai University, and married his student Zhang Qinqiu in 1924. In late 1925 and early 1926, Shen and Zhang went to the Soviet Union to attend Moscow Sun Yat-sen University. In Moscow, they had a daughter, who they left behind when they returned to China in 1930. In January 1931, at Jinzhai County, Anhui Province, Shen Zemin was made a Chinese Communist Party Committee Secretary for the Eyuwan Soviet. He died there of a lung ailment two years later.
