= Hejiang Province =

Province of the Republic of China (1945–1949)

Coordinates: 46.6°N 130.0°E

Sankiang Province (1934–1945) Hokiang Province (1945–1948) 三江省 (1934–1945) 合江省 (1945–1948)
- Province of the Manchukuo (1932–1945); Province of the Republic of China (1945–1948)
- 1934–1948
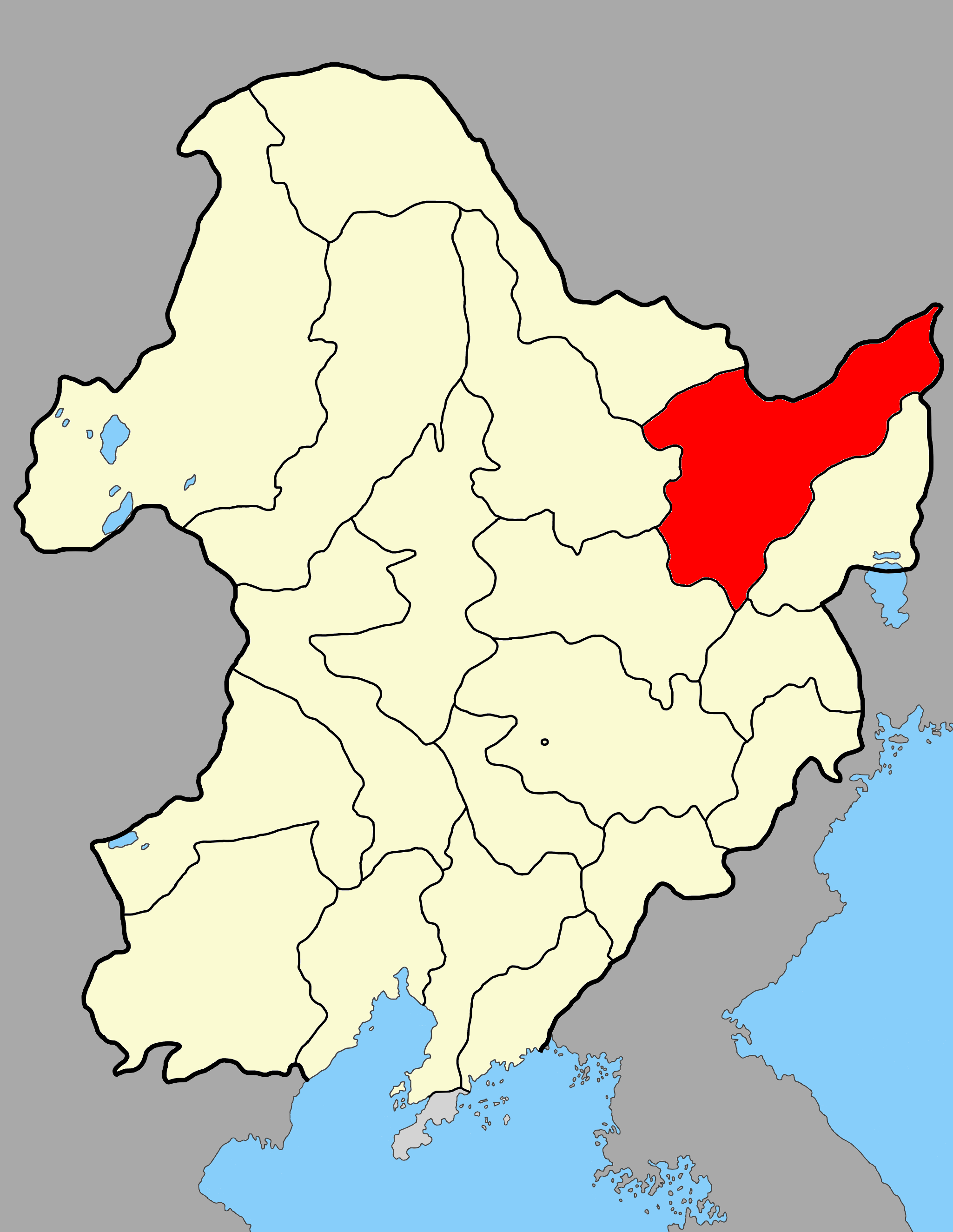
- Map of Sankiang within Manchukuo
- Map of Hokiang within the ROC
- Capital: Kiamusze
- Area
  - 1947: 135,406 km^{2} (52,281 sq mi)
- Population
  - 1947: 1,841,100
- History
  - Established: 1932
  - Disestablished: 1948
Preceded by	Succeeded by
Jilin	Songjiang Province
- Today part of: China ∟ Heilongjiang

Hokiang, (Chinese: 合江; pinyin: Héjiāng) was a province in Northeast China, established in 1945. It was c. 52,300 sq mi (135,500 km²) in size. The provincial capital was Jiamusi.

== History ==
=== Medieval ===
From 698 to 936, the Mohe-ruled kingdom of Balhae (Bohai) occupied northern Korea and parts of Northeast China and Primorsky Krai, consisting of the Nanai, the Udege, and the Evenks and descendants of the Tungus-speaking people and the people of the Goguryeo kingdom. Hejiang, later settled by Northern Mohe tribes, was submitted to the Balhae Kingdom under King Mun and King Seon's reign (818-830):

- Funie Mohe (拂涅靺鞨) was located on the south between Hejiang and Songjiang Province
- Tieli Mohe (鐵利靺鞨) was west of Hejiang
- Heishui Mohe (黑水靺鞨) roughly between the north of Hejiang (Shuangyashan, Jiamusi, Hegang and Yichun) and the south of actual Khabarovsk Krai (Bikin, Vyazemsky, Lazo and Khabarovsk neighbourhood)

King Seon administrated their territories via three prefectures:

- Dongping (Dongpyeong) Prefecture (東平府)
  - Yizhou (Iju) (伊州), present-day Mishan (Chinese: 密山; pinyin: Mìshān) as its administrative centre, corresponding to the previous land of Funie Mohe
- Dingli (Cheolli) Prefecture (定理府)
  - Delizhen (Deongnijin) (德理鎮) present-day Harbin (Chinese: 哈爾濱; pinyin: Hā'ěrbīn), as its administrative centre, corresponding to the previous land of Tieli Mohe
- Huaiyuan (Hoewon) Prefecture (懷遠府)
  - Dazhou (Dalju) (達州) present-day Tongjiang (Chinese: 同江; pinyin: Tóngjiāng), as its administrative centre corresponding to the southern part of Heishui Mohe territory

Balhae was an early feudal medieval state of Eastern Asia. It developed its industry, agriculture, animal husbandry, and had its own cultural traditions and art. People of Balhae maintained political, economic and cultural contacts with the Tang dynasty, as well as Korea and Japan.

=== Modern ===
The province was formed in 1945 after the capture of Japanese-controlled Manchukuo. In 1949, the province was incorporated into Songjiang Province and in 1954 the whole area was included into Heilongjiang Province.

== See also ==
- Chinese irredentism § Taiwan
