= Chinese irredentism =

Irredentist claims to territories of the former Chinese Empire

Evolution of Chinese territories throughout Chinese history.

Chinese irredentism involves irredentist claims to the territories of former Chinese dynasties made by the Republic of China (ROC) (Note: The Republic of China was based on mainland China before 1949, and has been based on the island of Taiwan since 1949.) and subsequently the People's Republic of China (PRC).

== Background ==
In Chinese political theory, relations between foreign states were governed by the tributary system. Since the Emperor of China held the Mandate of Heaven, his rule was universal and extended to all under Heaven. Sometimes neighboring states were actual protectorates or vassal states over which Chinese dynasties exerted a large amount of influence, while in other cases foreign states merely acknowledged China's nominal suzerainty in order to gain access to Chinese trade, which took place through the tributary system.

== Modern era ==
During the 20th century, the Republic of China claimed that numerous neighboring countries and regions used to be parts of China, including Outer Mongolia. According to Sun Yat-sen, the reasons for their loss were unequal treaties, forceful occupation and annexation, and foreign interference. Chiang Kai-shek and Mao Zedong were supportive of these claims.

In 1925, the Kuomintang issued a map that showed large areas outside China as belonging to China, including: large portions of Soviet central Asia, a portion of Ladakh, Nepal, Sikkim, Bhutan, Assam, Indochina, the Sulu Archipelago, Taiwan, the Ryukyus, the Philippines, Korea, and Sakhalin. A similar map was produced in 1954 by the Chinese Communist Party.

With the rise of general secretary of the Chinese Communist Party Xi Jinping and increasing territorial conflicts, it is generally believed that China continues to adhere to irredentist claims. A 2023 map by PRC's Ministry of Natural Resources showed a ten-dash line in the South China Sea and depicted territories in dispute with India and Russia as Chinese. Although these claims were not new, a host of countries voiced their objections. (Note: Brunei, India, Indonesia, Japan, Malaysia, the Philippines, Taiwan, the United States, and Vietnam)

Name	Simplified Chinese	Pinyin	year of the cession	Note
Outer Manchuria (Left bank of the Amur River and East of the Ussuri River)	外东北	Wài dōngběi	1858; 1860	Lost to the Russian Empire
Sakhalin	库页岛; 萨哈林岛	Kùyè dǎo; Sàhālín dǎo	1860	Lost to the Russian Empire and Empire of Japan
Sikkim	哲孟雄; 锡金	Zhémèngxióng; Xíjīn	1889	Lost to the British Empire
Taiwan and Penghu	台湾及澎湖	Táiwān jí Pēnghú	1895	Lost to the Empire of Japan
South Tibet (part of modern-day Arunachal Pradesh)	藏南 (South Tibet); 阿鲁纳恰尔邦 (Arunachal Pradesh)	Zàng nán (South Tibet); Ālǔnàqiàěr bāng (Arunachal Pradesh)	1914	Lost to the British Empire
Pamir Mountains/Ladakh area	帕米尔	Pàmǐ'ěr	1895	Lost to the Russian Empire and the British Empire

=== Bhutan ===
On June 29, 2017, Bhutan protested to China against the construction of a road in the disputed territory of Doklam. On the same day, the Bhutanese border was put on high alert and border security was tightened as a result of the growing tensions. In 2020, China claimed that the Sakteng Wildlife Sanctuary was also part of the territory in dispute.

=== East China Sea ===
The PRC has frequently deployed ships since the 2010s to contest Japanese claim over the Senkaku Islands.

=== India ===
Map of Arunachal Pradesh, part of which is claimed by China as South Tibet.

China maintains territorial disputes with India with regard to Aksai Chin and the McMahon Line. The Chinese government claims the Aksai Chin as part of Xinjiang and Tibet, while the government of India claims the territory as part of Ladakh. The 1914 Simla Convention, which the Chinese government does not recognize, negotiated the McMahon Line between India and Tibet. Tensions between India and China have erupted several times, with the largest being the Sino-Indian War of 1962 in which China was victorious and gained control over Aksai Chin, and the 1967 conflict in which India won. The 2020 border clashes, which caused casualties for both sides, further strained Sino–Indian relations.

China has reinforced its claim by publishing maps depicting South Tibet as Chinese territory. China also pushed forward to reinforce its claim over Sikkim and Ladakh, and consolidating border control in Aksai Chin.

=== Korea ===
In 2002, the Northeast Project conducted by the Chinese Academy of Social Sciences (CASS) claimed Goguryeo as a local ethnic minority state in Northeast China. This sparked a major academic and diplomatic controversy, as Korean experts on Goguryeo history accused the Chinese government of manipulating history for political purposes. Both North Korea and South Korea expressed opposition of this move towards the Chinese government.

=== South China Sea ===
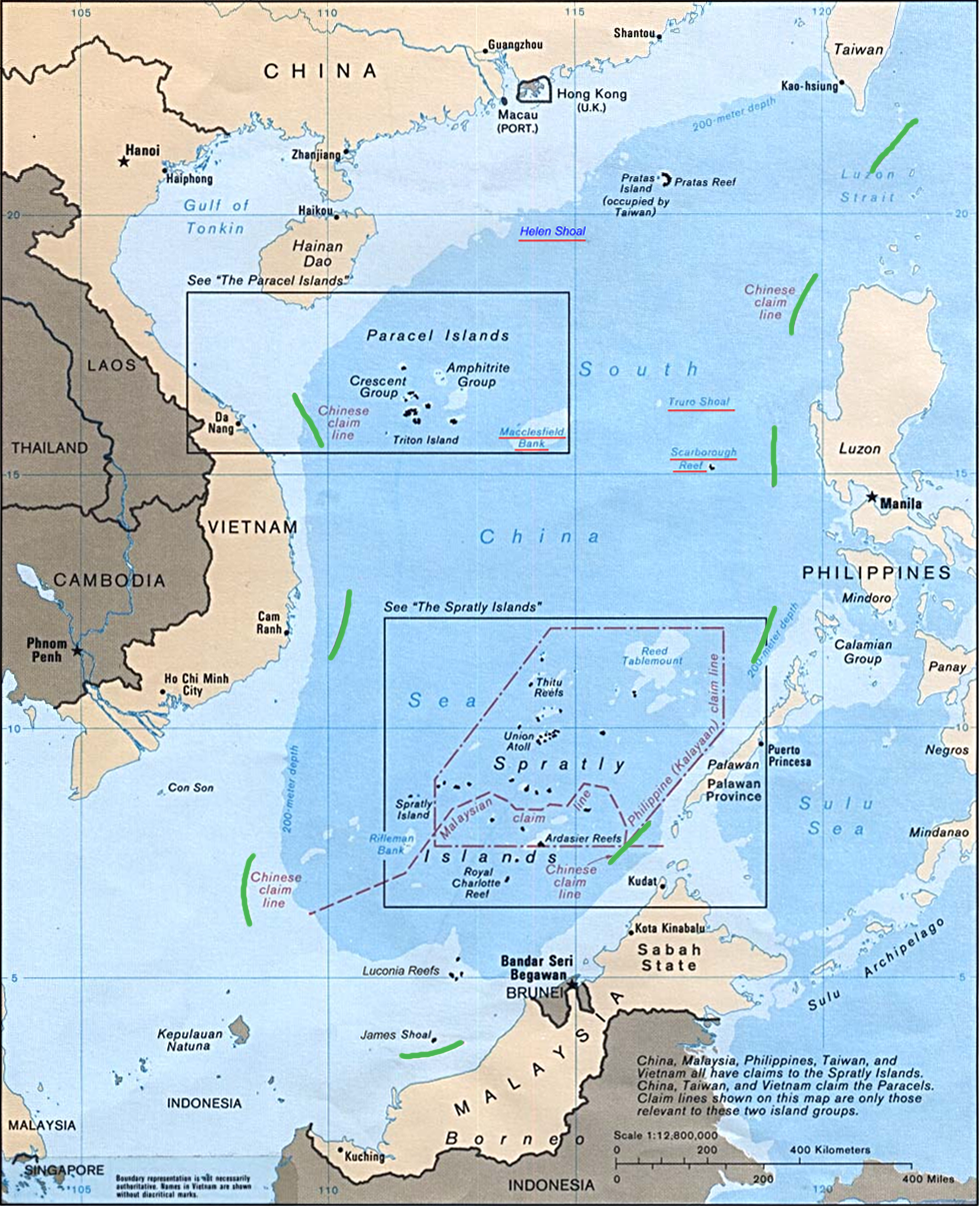
The Nine-dash line represents China's irredentist claims in the South China Sea.

Territorial claims of the People's Republic of China (PRC) and the Republic of China (ROC) in the South China Sea overlap with the claims of Vietnam, the Philippines, Brunei and Malaysia. In 2020, the PRC announced the establishment of Sansha City, which included the entirety of the Paracel Islands and Spratly Islands.

=== Taiwan ===
The Republic of China (ROC) was established in mainland China in 1912 following the conclusion of the 1911 Revolution which led to the collapse of the Qing dynasty. The Chinese Civil War that broke out in 1927 was fought between the Kuomintang-led Nationalist government and the Chinese Communist Party (CCP).

Since the end of the Chinese Civil War in 1949, the de facto territories of the ROC are limited to the Taiwan Area which includes the island of Taiwan (ceded to the Empire of Japan in 1895 by the Qing dynasty of China; handover to the Republic of China in 1945) and several other islands. Meanwhile, the People's Republic of China (PRC), established in 1949 by the CCP, controls mainland China, Hong Kong and Macau. Officially, both the ROC and the PRC claim de jure sovereignty over all of China (including Taiwan), and regard the other government as being in rebellion.

Until 1971, the ROC was the representative of China at the United Nations (UN) and was a permanent member of the UN Security Council with veto power. In 1971, the PRC replaced the ROC as the representative of China at the UN.

Skepticism from Taiwanese toward the PRC has intensified as a result of growing Chinese nationalist threat to attack the island if an independent Taiwanese state was to be created. Since the election of the independence-leaning Tsai Ing-wen, the PRC has conducted numerous military drills preparing for possible armed conflict with the ROC.

=== Tibet ===
Tibet came under the control of the Qing dynasty of China in 1720 and remained under Qing suzerainty (or protectorate) until 1912. The succeeding Republic of China claimed inheritance of all territories held by the Qing dynasty, including Tibet. After the Xinhai Revolution in 1911, most of the area comprising the present-day Tibet Autonomous Region (TAR) became a de facto independent polity except for border regions such as Amdo and Eastern Kham.

After defeating the Kuomintang in the Chinese Civil War, the People's Republic of China (PRC) gained control of Tibet through a series of events that involved negotiations with the Government of Tibet, a military conflict in the Chamdo area of western Kham in October 1950, and the Seventeen Point Agreement, which was ratified by the 14th Dalai Lama in October 1951 but later repudiated.

== See also ==
- Chinese imperialism
- Celestial Empire
- Territorial disputes of the People's Republic of China
- Map of National Shame
