= Tongjiang, Heilongjiang =

Tongjiang 同江市
- County-level city
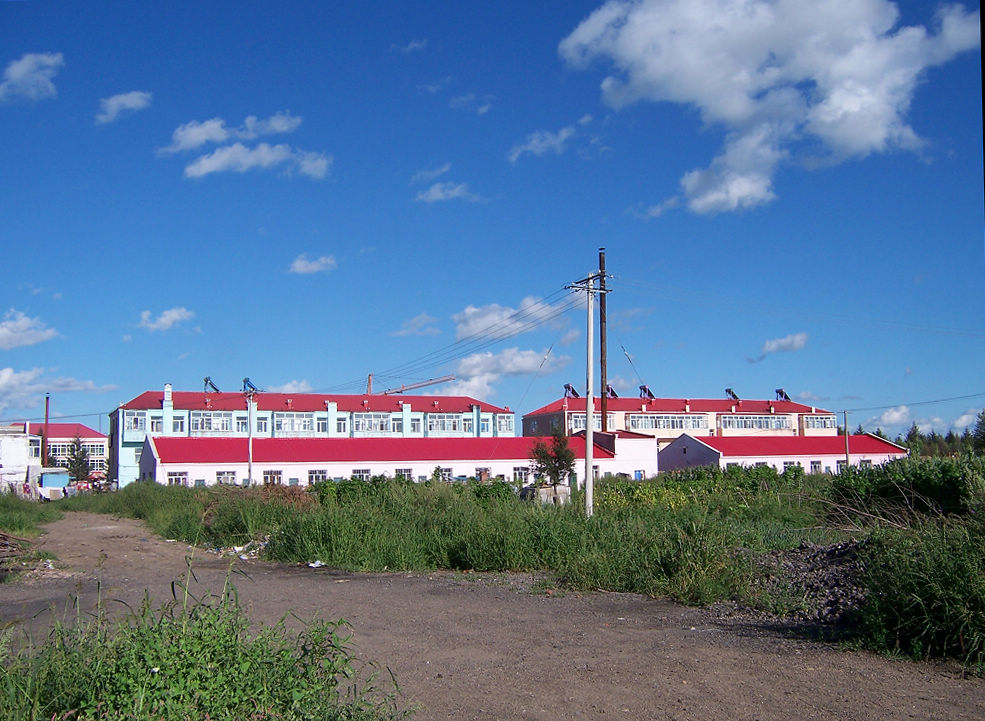
- A building in Honghe Farm

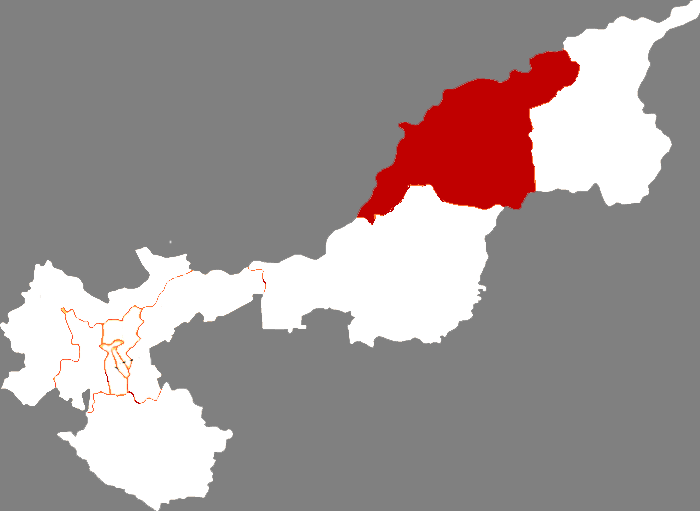
- Location of Tongjiang in Jiamusi

- Location in Heilongjiang
- Coordinates: 47°39′N 132°30′E
- Country: People's Republic of China
- Province: Heilongjiang
- Prefecture-level city: Jiamusi

Area
  - Total: 6,164 km^{2} (2,380 sq mi)

Population
  - Total: 211,609
  - Density: 34.33/km^{2} (88.91/sq mi)
- Time zone: UTC+8 (China Standard)
- Climate: Dwb
- Website: tongjiang.gov.cn

Tongjiang (Chinese: 同江市; pinyin: Tóngjiāng Shì) is a city of 160,000 in eastern Heilongjiang province, People's Republic of China, located at the confluence and on the right banks of the Songhua and Amur Rivers, the latter which marks the border with Russia. Administratively, it is a county-level city of Jiamusi.

== Toponymy ==
The city is also referred to by the Nanai toponym Lahasusu (Chinese: 拉哈苏苏; pinyin: Lāhāsūsū), which means "ancient house" in the Nanai language.

== History ==
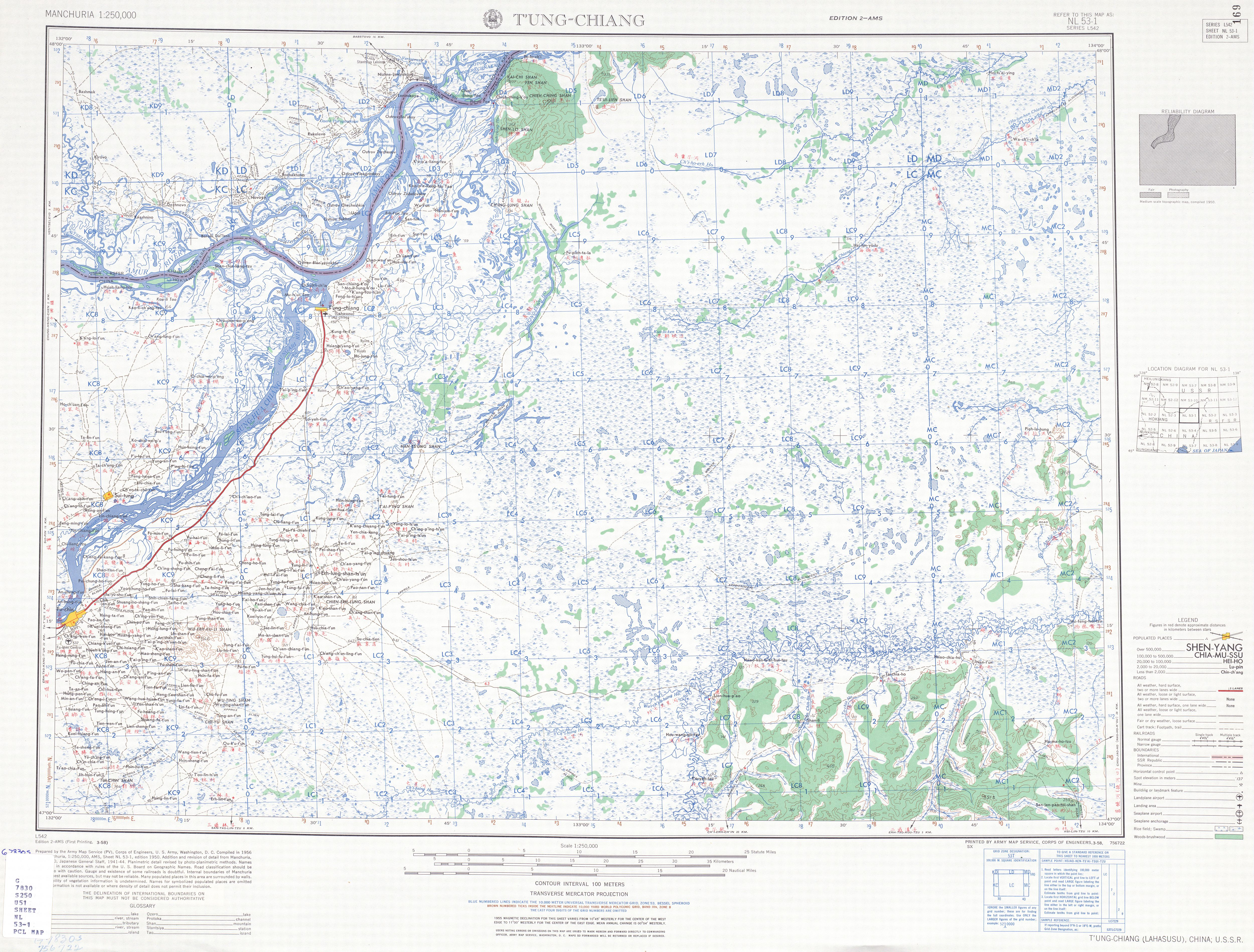
Tongjiang (labelled as T'ung-chiang (Lahasusu) 同江) (1956)

=== Ancient history ===
During the Western Zhou (1045 BCE - 771 BCE), the area of present-day Tongjiang was inhabited by the Sushen people. Later, during the Qin and Han dynasties (221 BCE - 220 CE), the area was inhabited by the Yilou. During the Northern and Southern dynasties (420 CE - 589 CE), the area was inhabited by the Wuji.

=== Early medieval history ===
From 698 to 936, the kingdom of Balhae occupied northern Korea and parts of Manchuria and Primorsky Krai, consisting of the Nanai, the Udege, the Evenks, descendants of the Tungus-speaking people, and the people of the recently fallen Goguryeo kingdom of Korea. Sometime during the Sui or Tang dynasties (581 CE to 907 CE), the Wuji people disappeared from the area, and it became inhabited by Heishui Mohe tribes (Korean: 흑수말갈; Hanja: 黑水靺鞨, pinyin: Hēishuǐ Mòhé). These tribes were submitted to Balhae Kingdom under King Seon's reign (818-830).

King Seon administrated their territories by creating a prefecture in the neighbourhood: The Hoiwon Prefecture (Korean: 회원부; Hanja: 懷遠府) with Dalju (Korean: 달주; Hanja: 達州), present-day Tongjiang, as its administrative centre.

=== 20th century ===
During the Sino-Soviet conflict in 1929, the Soviet Amur Military Flotilla defeated the Chinese Sungari Military Flotilla in the Battle of Lahasusu.

== Administrative divisions ==
Tongjiang administers 2 subdistricts, 6 towns, 4 townships, and 11 other township-level divisions.

=== Subdistricts ===
The city's two subdistricts are Fanrong Subdistrict (Chinese: 繁荣街道) and Xinghua Subdistrict (Chinese: 兴华街道).

=== Towns ===
The city's six towns are Tongjiang (同江镇), Leye (乐业镇), Sancun (三村镇), Linjiang (临江镇), Xiangyang (向阳镇), and Qinghe (青河镇).

=== Townships ===
The city's four townships are Jiejinkou Township (街津口乡), Bacha Township (八岔乡), Jinchuan Township (金川乡), and Yinchuan Township (银川乡).

=== Other township-level divisions ===
In addition to the aforementioned divisions, Tongjiang administers 11 other township-level divisions, comprising two tree farms (林场), seven farms (农场), one seed farm (良种场), and one ranch (牧场).

The city's two township-level tree farms are Jiejinkou Tree Farm (Chinese: 街津口林场) and Yabei Tree Farm (Chinese: 鸭北林场).

The city's seven township-level farms are Qindeli Farm (Chinese: 勤得利农场), Qinglongshan Farm (Chinese: 青龙山农场), Qianjin Farm (Chinese: 前进农场), Honghe Farm (Chinese: 洪河农场), Yalühe Farm (Chinese: 鸭绿河农场; lit. 'Yalu River Farm'), Nongjiang Farm (Chinese: 浓江农场), and Zhiqing Farm (Chinese: 知青农场).

The city's sole seed farm is Tongjiang Seed Farm (Chinese: 良种场; lit. 'Seed Farm') and Tongjiang Livestock Farm (Chinese: 畜牧场; lit. 'Livestock Farm').

== Demographics ==
As of January 2022, Tongjiang is home to about 1,500 Nanai people, one of China's smallest recognized ethnic groups.

== Climate ==
Climate data for Tongjiang, elevation 58 m (190 ft), (1991–2020 normals, extremes 1981–2010)
Month	Jan	Feb	Mar	Apr	May	Jun	Jul	Aug	Sep	Oct	Nov	Dec	Year
Record high °C (°F)	0.2 (32.4)	6.2 (43.2)	19.1 (66.4)	31.0 (87.8)	32.8 (91.0)	38.0 (100.4)	37.7 (99.9)	37.1 (98.8)	31.2 (88.2)	25.6 (78.1)	14.0 (57.2)	3.7 (38.7)	38.0 (100.4)
Mean daily maximum °C (°F)	−14.2 (6.4)	−8.9 (16.0)	0.0 (32.0)	11.2 (52.2)	19.5 (67.1)	24.3 (75.7)	27.0 (80.6)	25.2 (77.4)	20.2 (68.4)	11.0 (51.8)	−2.4 (27.7)	−12.8 (9.0)	8.3 (47.0)
Daily mean °C (°F)	−19.4 (−2.9)	−15.1 (4.8)	−5.4 (22.3)	5.5 (41.9)	13.8 (56.8)	19.2 (66.6)	22.3 (72.1)	20.6 (69.1)	14.7 (58.5)	5.5 (41.9)	−6.9 (19.6)	−17.4 (0.7)	3.1 (37.6)
Mean daily minimum °C (°F)	−24.2 (−11.6)	−21.1 (−6.0)	−11.2 (11.8)	0.1 (32.2)	8.0 (46.4)	14.3 (57.7)	17.9 (64.2)	16.5 (61.7)	9.6 (49.3)	0.7 (33.3)	−11 (12)	−21.6 (−6.9)	−1.8 (28.7)
Record low °C (°F)	−40.4 (−40.7)	−37.1 (−34.8)	−30.6 (−23.1)	−13.9 (7.0)	−2.7 (27.1)	5.5 (41.9)	9.2 (48.6)	7.1 (44.8)	−1.0 (30.2)	−12.7 (9.1)	−26.7 (−16.1)	−35.0 (−31.0)	−40.4 (−40.7)
Average precipitation mm (inches)	6.2 (0.24)	5.7 (0.22)	13.4 (0.53)	27.3 (1.07)	59.9 (2.36)	75.4 (2.97)	127.8 (5.03)	121.5 (4.78)	68.5 (2.70)	29.7 (1.17)	15.9 (0.63)	9.7 (0.38)	561 (22.08)
Average precipitation days (≥ 0.1 mm)	6.0	4.4	6.3	8.2	12.3	12.0	12.8	12.9	10.9	8.1	6.4	7.6	107.9
Average snowy days	8.9	6.3	8.0	4.2	0.1	0	0	0	0	2.7	8.4	10.1	48.7
Average relative humidity (%)	72	67	64	61	63	73	80	83	75	65	68	72	70
Mean monthly sunshine hours	165.3	196.9	244.3	228.5	251.0	246.6	241.3	237.8	227.3	192.5	153.8	139.0	2,524.3
Percentage possible sunshine	60	68	66	56	53	52	50	54	61	58	56	53	57
Source: China Meteorological Administration

== Transportation ==
- China National Highway 221
- Jiansanjiang Airport

=== Tongjiang-Nizhneleninskoye railway bridge ===
The Tongjiang-Nizhneleninskoye railway bridge was proposed in 2007 by Valery Solomonovich Gurevich, the vice-chairman of the Jewish Autonomous Oblast in Russia. The railway bridge over the Amur River will connect Tongjiang with Nizhneleninskoye, a village in the Jewish Autonomous Oblast.

The Chinese portion of the bridge was finished in July 2016. Work began on the longer Russian section of the bridge in December 2016. Completion of structural link between the two sides of the bridge was completed in March 2019. Opening to rail traffic has been repeatedly delayed, with the December 2019 estimate being "the end of 2020", and then 3rd quarter of 2021.

The bridge was completed in August 2021, and began undergoing tests in April 2022. Rostislav Goldstein, the current governor of the Jewish Autonomous Oblast, announced that he expected the bridge to be fully operational by August 20, 2022.

== See also ==
- China–Russia border
- Jiamusi
- List of Provinces of Balhae
- Nanai people
