= Xiaotian =

Xiaotian may refer to:

- Xiaotian, Anhui, a town in Shucheng County, Anhui, China
- Xiaotian Township, in Ningdu County, Jiangxi, China
- Xiaotian Quan or Xiaotian, Erlang Shen's dog in Chinese mythology
