= Chinese Communist Revolution =

1927–1949 social revolution in China

Chinese Revolution
- Part of the Chinese Civil War and the Cold War
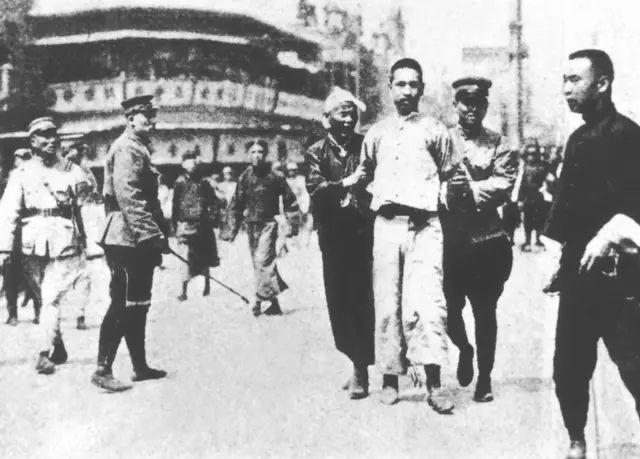
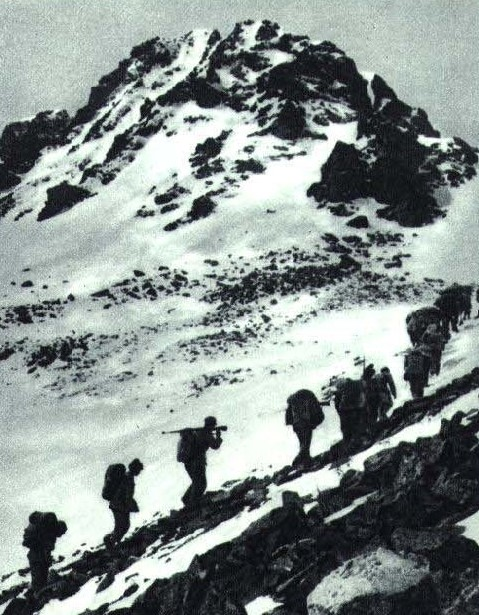
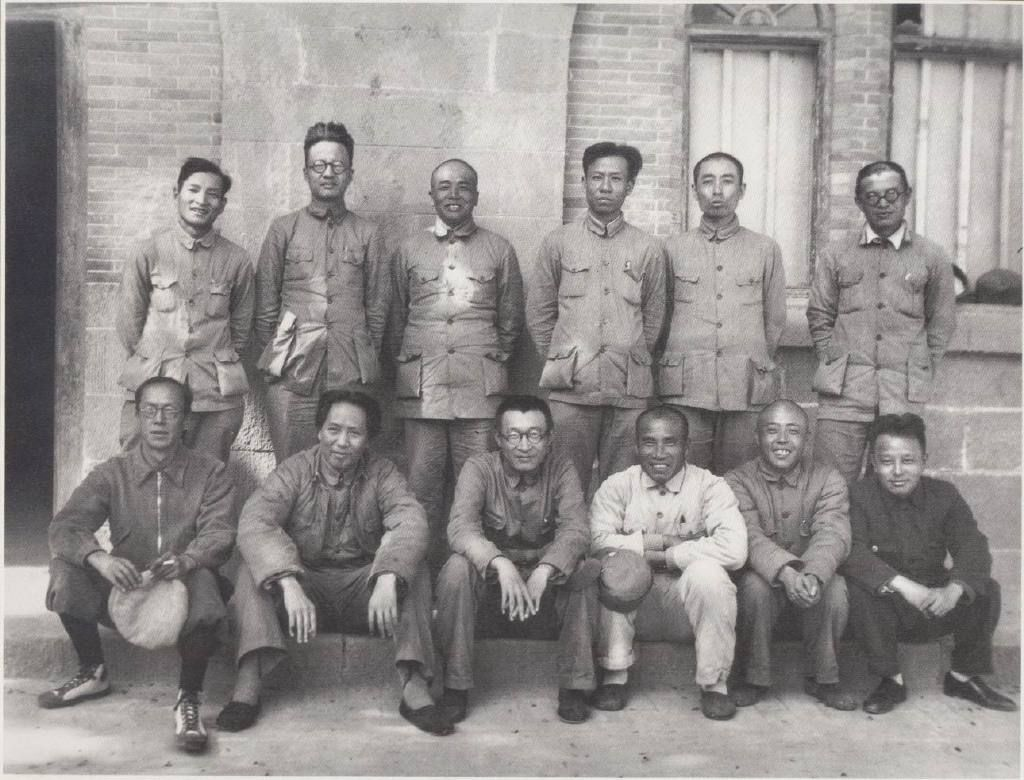
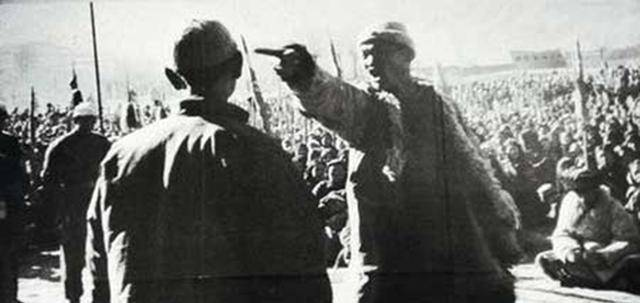
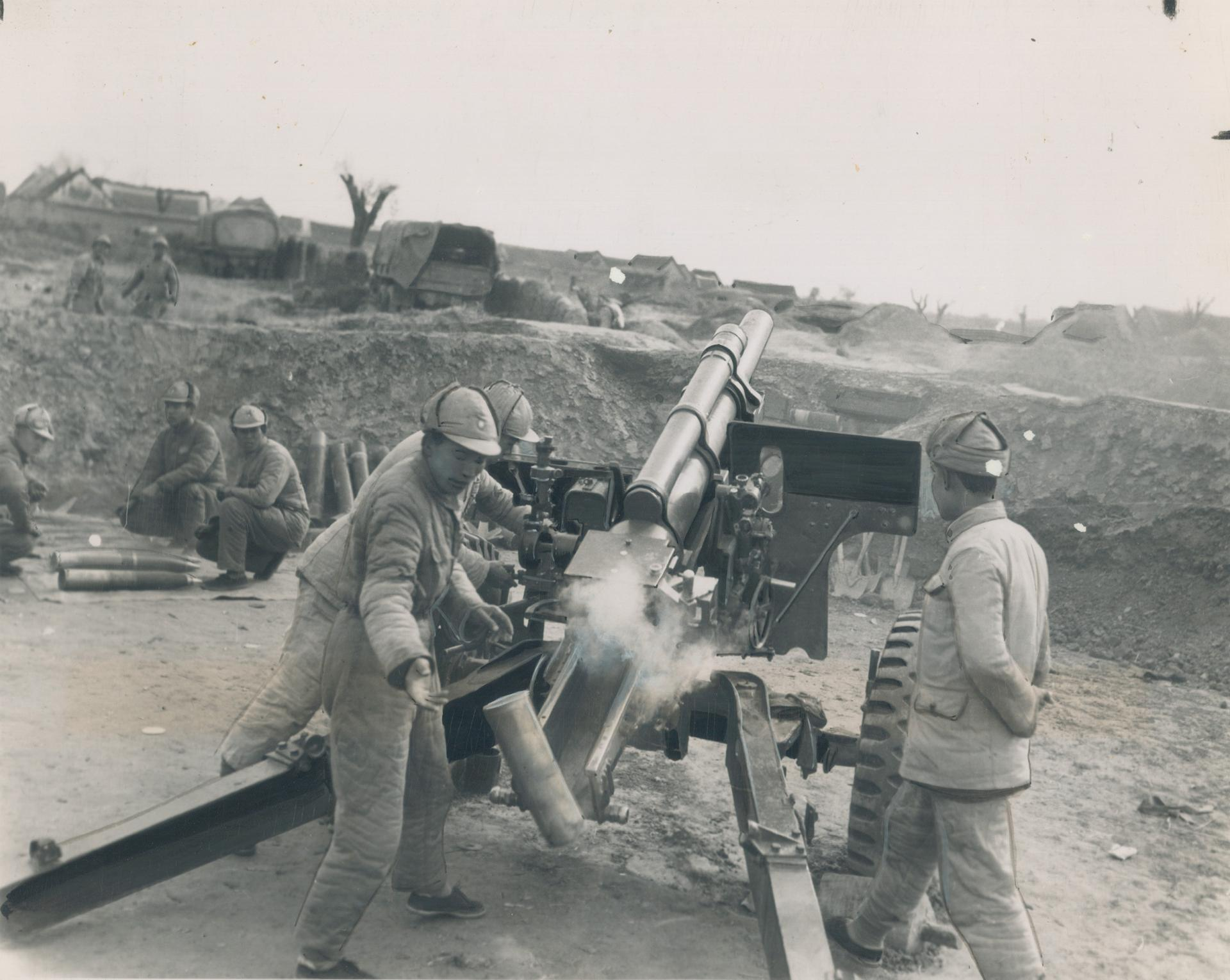
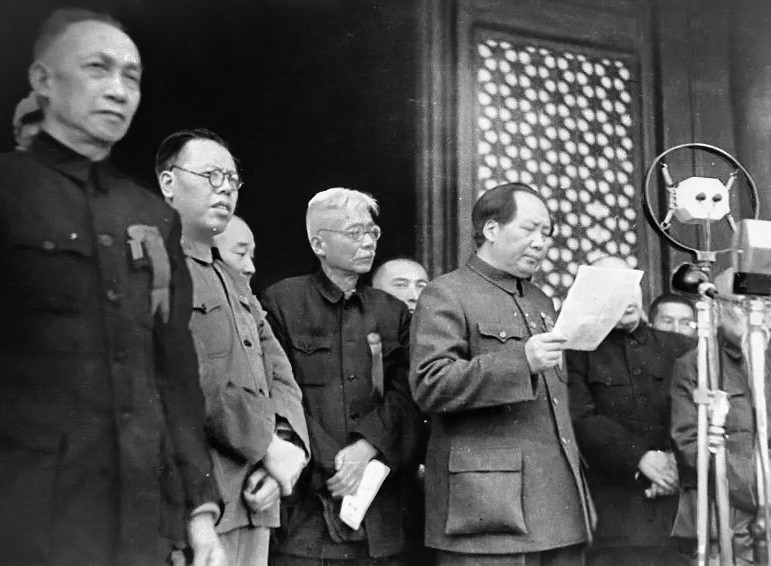
- Clockwise: Massacre of communists in Shanghai; Long March; Peasants pidou a landlord during Land Reform Movement; Proclamation of the founding of PRC; Huaihai campaign; CCP leaders during Shanbei Era
- Date: 1 August 1927 – 1 October 1949
- Location: China
- Outcome: Communist victory: Proclamation of the People's Republic of China; Retreat of the government of the Republic of China to Taiwan

The Chinese Communist Revolution was a social and political revolution in mainland China that began in 1927 and culminated with the proclamation of the People's Republic of China (PRC) in 1949. The revolution was led by the Chinese Communist Party (CCP), which afterwards became the ruling party of China. The political revolution resulted in major social changes within China and has been looked at as a model by revolutionary communist movements in other countries.

During the preceding century, termed the century of humiliation, the decline of the Qing dynasty and the rise of foreign imperialism caused escalating social, economic, and political problems in China. The Qing collapsed in 1912 and were replaced with the Republic of China, which had itself fallen into warring factions by 1917. A small group of urban intellectuals, inspired by the October Revolution and European socialist ideas, founded the CCP in 1921. They created an alliance known as the First United Front with the much larger Kuomintang (KMT), having the shared goal of overthrowing the warlords governing China. During this period the CCP rapidly expanded its membership, organized a militant labor movement in several of China's major cities, and established rudimentary peasant associations in rural areas. Nonetheless, and despite the First United Front's military successes, KMT leader Chiang Kai-shek ended the alliance in 1927 by initiating the Shanghai massacre.

The Chinese Civil War between the CCP and Chiang Kai-shek's Nationalists fundamentally changed the course of the Chinese Communist Revolution. Forced to flee into the remote countryside, semi-isolated CCP cadres began to experiment with land reform and other ways of appealing to the peasantry. One of the most successful local leaders was Mao Zedong, who turned the Jiangxi Soviet into a "state within a state". In 1935, the Communists were handed a major military defeat, and the survivors made the Long March to a new base in northwest China. During the Long March, Mao rose from a regional leader to undisputed leader of the entire CCP. After settling in their new base, the Communists undertook a campaign of ideological self-purification to solidify their allegiance to Mao and their new peasant-based strategy.

Meanwhile, Japan had taken advantage of China's disunity to seize Manchuria and other Chinese territories. Chiang Kai-shek, prioritizing "first internal pacification, then external resistance", avoided confronting Japan. The Communists argued that the CCP and KMT should cooperate to fight the Japanese, an appeal to patriotism that won them broad sympathy. In 1936, Nationalist troops who had become sympathetic to the Communists kidnapped Chiang Kai-shek and forced him to begin ceasefire negotiations. The Second United Front was finalized when the Japanese launched a full-scale invasion of China the following year. The renewed alliance allowed the CCP to once again expand their areas of influence by waging a guerrilla war behind Japanese lines.

Following the Japanese surrender in 1945, China became a battlefield in the Cold War. The Nationalists received military support from the United States and the CCP from the Soviet Union. Although the Nationalists at first held most of the country, sympathy for the Communists grew in urban areas suffering from high unemployment, runaway inflation, and rampant government corruption. The presence of United States Marines in Chinese cities further inflamed anti-imperialist sentiment, especially among students. When peace talks between the two Chinese sides floundered, the Civil War resumed. The Communists' newly-formed People's Liberation Army launched a successful series of campaigns that defeated the Nationalists and forced them to retreat to Taiwan in 1949.

The Communist victory had a major impact on the global balance of power: China became the largest socialist state by population, as well as a third force in the Cold War following the 1956 Sino-Soviet split. The People's Republic offered direct and indirect support to communist movements around the world, and inspired the growth of Maoist parties in a number of countries. Shock at the CCP's success, and the emerging geopolitical domino theory postulating communism's spread across East Asia, led the United States to stage successive military interventions against Chinese-backed forces in Korea and Southeast Asia. The CCP remains in government in mainland China and is the second-largest political party in the world.

== Start and end dates ==
Many historians agree with the Chinese Communist Party official history that the Chinese Communist Revolution dates to the founding of the party in 1921. A few consider it to be the latter part of the Chinese Civil War, since it was only after the Second Sino-Japanese War that the tide turned decisively in favour of the CCP. That said, it is not entirely clear when the second half of the civil war began. The earliest possible date would be the end of the Second United Front in January 1941, when Nationalist forces ambushed and destroyed the New Fourth Army. Another possible date is the surrender of Japan on August 10, 1945, which began a scramble by CCP and Nationalist forces to seize the equipment and territory left behind by the Japanese. However, full-scale warfare between the two sides did not truly recommence until June 26, 1946, when Chiang Kai-shek launched a major offensive against CCP bases in Manchuria. This article is focused on the political and social developments that contributed to the Revolution, rather than the military events of the Civil War, so it begins with the founding of the CCP.

The most common date used for the end of the Revolution is the Proclamation of the People's Republic of China on 1 October 1949. Nonetheless, the Nationalist Government had not evacuated to Taiwan until December, and significant fighting (such as the conquest of Hainan) continued well into 1950 and the takeover of Tibet in 1951. While never posing a serious threat to the People's Republic, the Kuomintang Islamic insurgency continued until as late as 1958 in the provinces of Gansu, Qinghai, Ningxia, Xinjiang, and Yunnan. ROC soldiers who had fled into the mountains of Burma and Thailand worked with the CIA and KMT to finance anti-Communist activities with drug trafficking well into the 1980s. No formal peace between the ROC and the PRC has ever been negotiated.

== Origins ==
During the final years of the Qianlong Emperor's reign, China began a long period of decline popularly known as the "century of humiliation". Successive administrations within the imperial administration of the Qing dynasty failed to address the mounting problems of economic stagnation, official corruption, and military weakness. Massive peasant rebellions, most notably the Taiping Rebellion, cost millions of lives and ravaged the countryside. Japan and the Western powers forced China to accept unequal treaties that gave them territorial concessions and allowed them to exploit the Chinese economy. China had been turned into a "semi-colony" by the time of the Boxer Rebellion.

=== The landlord system ===
Prior to the revolution, the majority of agricultural land in rural China was owned by a class of landlords and wealthy peasants, with between 50 and 65 percent of peasants owning little or no land and thus needing to rent additional land from landlords. (Note: Social scientist Chen Hansheng divides the rural population into five basic economic classes. At the top were landlords who owned large amounts of land, animals, and other capital and lived entirely off of what they collected in rents. The rich peasants took a significant portion of their income from rent, but owned slightly less land and therefore had to work their land themselves alongside hired labor. Middle peasants had enough land and capital to sustain themselves without working for wages, but neither could they afford to hire laborers. The poor peasants, usually the largest group, owned some land but not enough to live on, and had to sell part of their labor to landlords in order to make ends meet. Finally, on the lowest social rung were the hired laborers, who had no land of their own and had to survive entirely off of wages.) This disparity in land ownership differed by region, and was more extreme in southern China where the commercialization of agriculture was more developed. For example, in Guangdong more than half the rural population owned no land at all. Poor peasants owned an average of only 0.87 mu (about 0.14 acres) and so spent most of their time working rented land. Even in north China, where most peasants owned at least some land, the plots they owned were so small and infertile that they remained on the edge of starvation. Periodic famines were common during both the Qing dynasty and the later Republic of China. Between 1900 and the end of WWII, China experienced no less than six major famines, costing tens of millions of lives.

Depending on the system of tenancy, peasants renting land might have been expected to pay in kind or in cash, either as a fixed amount or as a proportion of the harvest. Where a share of the harvest was paid, as in much of north China, rates of 40%, 50%, and 60% were common. A system of sharecropping prevailed in much of Shanxi, where landlords owned all agricultural capital and expected 80% of the harvest as rent. The amount of fixed rents varied, but in most areas averaged about $4 a year per mu. Proponents of peasant exploitation as a cause of the Chinese Communist Revolution argue that these rents were often exorbitant and contributed to the extreme poverty of the peasantry. Agricultural economist John Lossing Buck disagreed, arguing that landlords' return on investment was not especially high in comparison to the standard rates of interest in China at the time.

=== Other forms of rural exploitation ===
According to William H. Hinton, author of a case study on how the Revolution impacted a village in north China:

The land held by the landlords and rich peasants, while ample, was not enough in itself to make them the dominant group in the village. It served primarily as a solid foundation for other forms of open and concealed exploitation which taken together raised a handful of families far above the rest of the inhabitants economically and hence politically and socially as well.

Landlords utilized forms of exploitation such as usury, corruption, and the theft of public funds to enrich themselves and their families. They ran side businesses with the profits from farming to shore up their finances and isolate themselves from the effects of bad harvests. On holidays, funerals, and other important events, landlords had the right to demand their tenants act as servants, reinforcing the social divide and engendering resentment from the peasants. Agnes Smedley observed how even within a short distance from Shanghai, rural landlords operated essentially as feudal lords, paying for private armies, dominating local politics, and keeping numerous concubines.

=== Radicalization of urban intellectuals ===
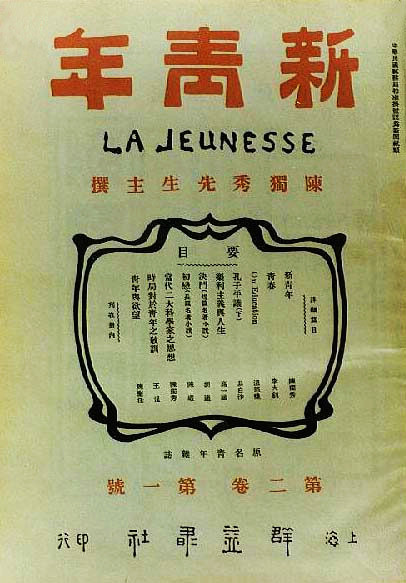
Chen Duxiu's journal New Youth played a major role in publicizing Marxist ideas to a wider Chinese audience during the New Culture Movement of the 1910s and 20s.

In the first decade of the twentieth century, young Chinese intellectuals such as Ma Junwu, Liang Qichao, and Zhao Bizhen were the first to translate and summarize socialist and Marxist ideas into Chinese. However, this happened on a very small scale, and had no immediate impacts. This would change following the 1911 Revolution, which saw military and popular revolts overthrow the Qing Dynasty. The failure of the new Chinese Republic to improve social conditions or modernize the country led scholars to take a greater interest in Western ideas such as socialism. The New Culture Movement was especially strong in cities like Shanghai, where Chen Duxiu began to publish the left-leaning journal New Youth in 1915. New Youth quickly became the most popular and widely distributed journal amongst the intelligentsia during this period.

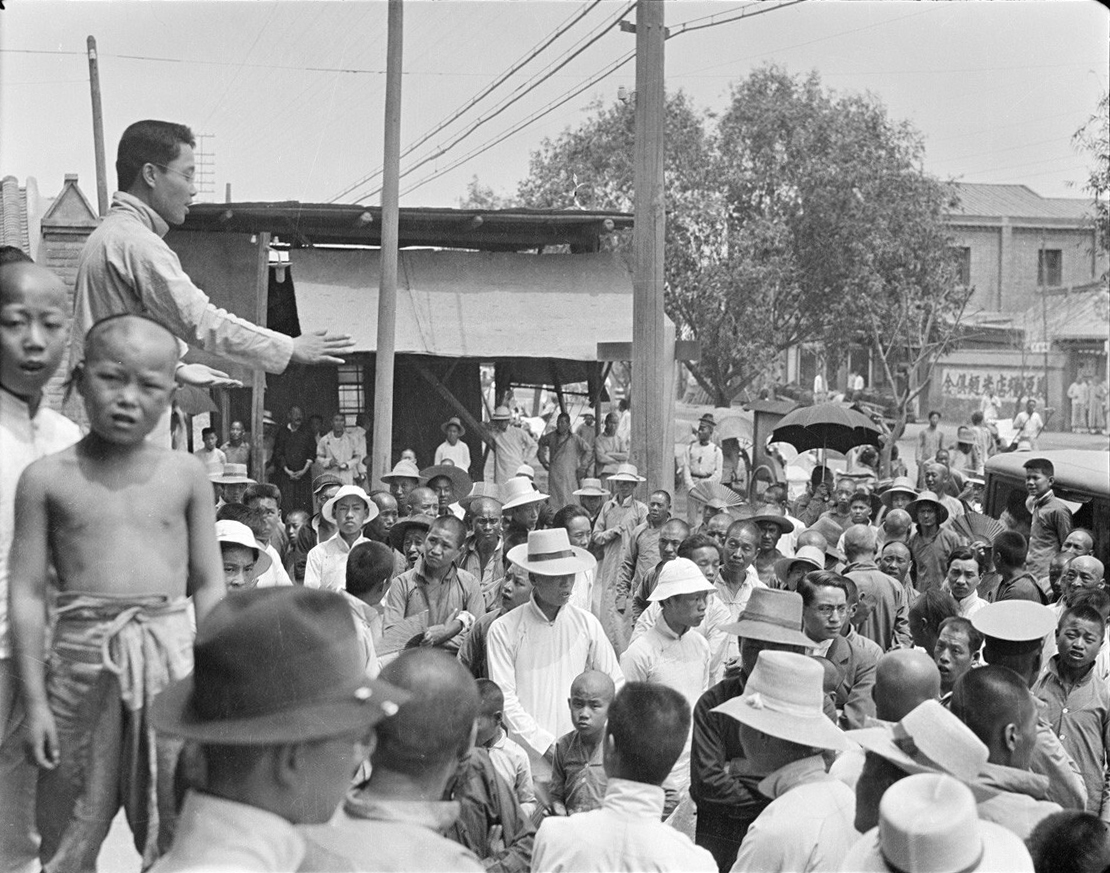
The May Fourth Movement radicalized the New Culture Movement. For the first time, the general urban population became involved in political demonstrations and many future Communist leaders were converted to Marxism.

In May 1919, news reached China that the Versailles Peace Conference had decided to give German-occupied province of Shandong to Japan rather than returning it to China. The Chinese public saw this not only as a betrayal by the Western allies, but also as a failure by the Chinese Republican government to properly defend the country against imperialism. In what became known as the May Fourth Movement, large protests erupted in major cities across China. Although led by students, these protests were significant because they included the first mass participation by those outside the traditional intellectual and cultural elites. Mao Zedong later stated that the May Fourth Movement "marked a new stage in China's bourgeois-democratic revolution against imperialism and feudalism...a powerful camp made its appearance in the bourgeois-democratic revolution, a camp consisting of the working class, the student masses and the new national bourgeoisie." Many political, and social leaders of the next five decades emerged at this time, including those of the Chinese Communist Party.

The October Revolution in Russia attracted the admiration of many of the organizers of the May Fourth Movement. Although exposure to Marxist theory was extremely limited in China at the time, Chinese radicals found Lenin's ideas about organizing a revolutionary movement to be readily applicable to their own context. Moreover, the Soviet Union (once established in 1922) offered a unique and compelling model of modernization and revolutionary social change in a semi-colonial nation. Historian Tony Saich wrote that the early Chinese Communists "were Bolsheviks before they were Marxists." Interest in the Bolsheviks led to an interest in Marxism. Students formed study groups to discuss Marx's ideas, including one at Peking University led by Li Dazhao. His study group included Chen Duxiu, who was working as a dean at the university. Other future party leaders who became interested in the Communist movement at this time include Mao Zedong and Zhou Enlai. As the editor of New Youth, Chen used his journal to publish a series of Marxist articles, including an entire issue devoted to the subject in 1919. By 1920, Li and Chen had fully converted to Marxism, and Li founded the Peking Socialist Youth Corps in Beijing. Chen moved back to Shanghai, where he also founded a small Communist group.

== Cooperation with the Nationalists ==
=== Foundation of the Chinese Communist Party ===
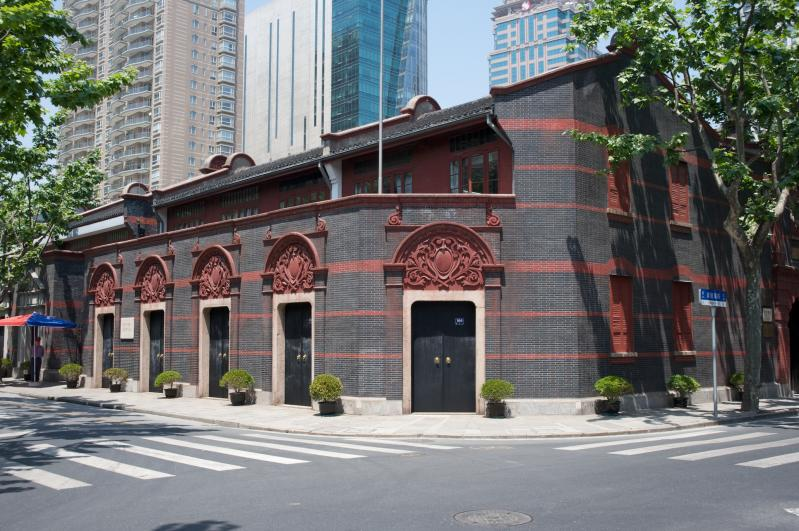
Location of the 1st National Congress of the Chinese Communist Party in July 1921, on Xintiandi, former French Concession, Shanghai.

By 1920, "skepticism about [study groups'] suitability as vehicles for reform had become widespread." Instead, most Chinese Marxists had determined to follow the Leninist model, which they understood as organizing a vanguard party around a core group of professional revolutionaries. The Chinese Communist Party was founded on 23 July 1921 in Shanghai, at the 1st National Congress of the CCP. The dozen delegates resolved to affiliate with the Communist International (Comintern), although the CCP would only formally become a member at its second congress. Chen was elected in absentia to be the first General Secretary. The Chinese Communist Party grew slowly in its first few years. The party had 50 members at the beginning of 1921, 200 in 1922, and 2,428 in 1925. In contrast, the Kuomintang had 50,000 members already in 1923. The CCP continued to be dominated by students and urban intellectuals living in China's large cities, where exposure to Marxist ideas was strongest: three of the first four party congresses were held in Shanghai, the other in Guangzhou. One exception was Peng Pai, who became the first CCP leader to seriously engage with the peasants. In Haifeng County in rural Guangdong, he organized a powerful peasant association that campaigned for lower rents, led anti-landlord boycotts, and organized welfare activities. By 1923, it claimed a membership of about 100,000, or one-quarter of the population of the entire county. Later that year, Peng worked with the KMT to establish a joint "Peasant Movement Training Institute" to train young idealists to work in rural areas, which slowly increased both parties' awareness of and engagement with the peasants and their issues.

=== First United Front ===
At the same time as CCP was developing in Shanghai, in Guangzhou the seasoned revolutionary Sun Yat-sen was building the Chinese Nationalist Party, or Kuomintang (KMT). Although not a communist, Sun admired the success of the Russian Revolution and sought help from the Soviet Union. The Sun–Joffe Manifesto issued in January 1923 formalized cooperation between the KMT and the Soviet Union. The CCP's Third Party Congress was held in Guangzhou later that year, and the Comintern instructed the CCP to disband and join the KMT as individuals. This was justified in view of the "two-stage theory" of revolution, which postulated that "feudal" societies such as China's needed to undergo a period of capitalist development before they could experience a successful socialist revolution. Although the CCP did agree to allow members to join the KMT, it did not disband. Sun encouraged this decision by offering praise for Vladimir Lenin and calling his principle of livelihood "a form of communism". This was the basis of the First United Front, which in effect turned the CCP into the left wing of the larger KMT. The KMT ratified this United Front at its First National Congress in 1924. The Soviets began sending the support the KMT needed for its planned expansion out of Guangdong. Military advisers Mikhail Borodin and Vasily Blyukher arrived in May to oversee the construction of the Whampoa Military Academy, financed with Soviet funds. Chiang Kai-shek, who the year prior had spent three months in the Soviet Union, was appointed commandant of the new National Revolutionary Army (NRA).

On 30 May 1925, Chinese students gathered at the Shanghai International Settlement, and held the May Thirtieth Movement in opposition to foreign interference in China. Specifically, with the support of the KMT, they called for the boycott of foreign goods and an end to the Settlement, which was governed by the British and Americans. The Shanghai Municipal Police, largely operated by the British, opened fire on the crowd of demonstrators. This incident sparked outrage throughout China, culminating in the Canton–Hong Kong strike, which began on 18 June, and proved a fertile recruiting ground for the CCP. Membership was catapulted to over 20,000, almost ten times what it had been earlier in the year. Concerns about the rising power of the leftist faction, and the effect of the strike on the Guangzhou government's ability to raise funds, which was largely dependent on foreign trade, led to increasing tensions within the United Front. When Sun Yat-sen had died on 12 March, his immediate successor as chairman was the moderate Liao Zhongkai, who supported the United Front and the KMT's close relationship with the Soviet Union. On August 20 Hu Hanmin's far-right faction likely orchestrated Liao's assassination. Hu was arrested for his connections to the murderers, leaving Chiang and Wang Jingwei—Sun's former confidant and a leftist sympathizer—as the two main contenders for control of the party. Amidst this backdrop, Chiang began to consolidate power in preparation for an expedition against the northern warlords. On 20 March 1926, he launched a bloodless purge of hardline communists who were opposed to the proposed expedition from the Guangzhou administration and its military, known as the Canton Coup. The rapid replacement of leadership enabled Chiang to effectively end civilian oversight of the military. At the same time, Chiang made conciliatory moves toward the Soviet Union, and attempted to balance the need for Soviet and CCP assistance in the fight against the warlords with his concerns about growing communist influence within the KMT. In the aftermath of the coup, Chiang negotiated a compromise whereby hardline members of the rightist faction, such as Wu Tiecheng, were removed from their posts in compensation for the purged leftists. By doing so, Chiang was able to prove his usefulness to the CCP and their Soviet sponsor, Joseph Stalin. Soviet aid to the KMT government would continue, as would co-operation with the CCP. A fragile coalition between KMT rightists, centrists led by Chiang, KMT leftists, and the CCP managed to hold together, laying the groundwork for the Northern Expedition.

=== The Northern Expedition ===
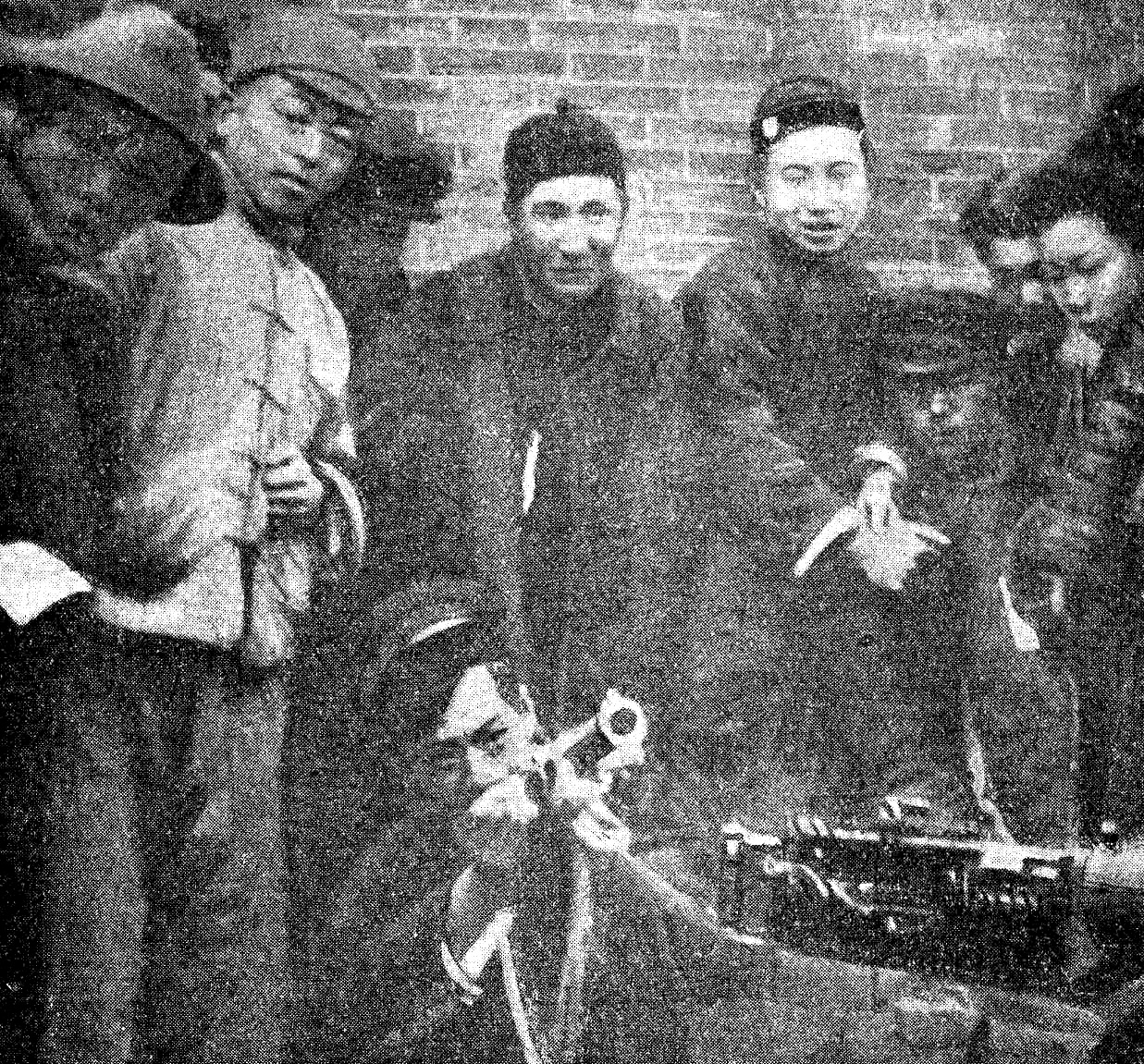
Shanghai workers posing with weapons in 1927. After successfully ousting the Zhili Clique and handing the city over to the Kuomintang, the Communist-allied workers were massacred.

By 1926, the Kuomintang (KMT) had solidified their control over Guangdong enough to rival the legitimacy of the Beiyang government based in Beijing. After purging his opponents in the KMT leadership, Chiang Kai-shek was appointed Generalissimo of the National Revolutionary Army and set out to defeat the warlords one at a time. The campaign saw massive success against Wu Peifu in Hunan, Hubei, and Henan. Sun Chuanfang put up a stronger resistance, but popular support for the KMT and opposition to the warlords helped the National Revolutionary Army (NRA) make inroads into Jiangxi, Fujian, and Zhejiang. As the NRA advanced, workers in the cities organized themselves into left-leaning trade unions: in Wuhan, for example, more than 300,000 had joined trade unions by the end of the year. The All-China Federation of Labor (ACFL), founded by the Communists in 1925, reached 2.8 million members by 1927.

At the same time as workers organized in the cities, peasants rose up across the countryside of Hunan and Hubei provinces, appropriating the land of the wealthy landowners, who were in many cases killed. Such uprisings angered senior KMT figures, who were themselves landowners, emphasising the growing class and ideological divide within the revolutionary movement. CCP leader Chen Duxiu was also upset, both from doubt in the peasants' revolutionary capabilities and fear that premature revolt would wreck the United Front. The KMT-CCP leadership dispatched prominent CCP cadre Mao Zedong to investigate and report on the nature of the unrest. Mao had returned from a previous visit to his rural home town Shaoshan personally convinced that the peasantry had revolutionary potential, and over the course of 1926 had established himself as an authority on rural issues while lecturing at the Peasant Movement Training Institute. Mao spent just over a month in Hunan and published his report in March. Rather than condemning the peasant movement, his now-famous Hunan Report made the case that a peasant-led revolution was not only justified, but practically possible and even inevitable. Mao predicted that:

In a very short time, in China's central, southern and northern provinces, several hundred million peasants will rise like a mighty storm, like a hurricane, a force so swift and violent that no power, however great, will be able to hold it back. They will smash all the trammels that bind them and rush forward along the road to liberation. They will sweep all the imperialists, warlords, corrupt officials, local tyrants and evil gentry into their graves. Every revolutionary party and every revolutionary comrade will be put to the test, to be accepted or rejected as they decide. There are three alternatives. To march at their head and lead them. To trail behind them, gesticulating and criticizing. Or to stand in their way and oppose them. Every Chinese is free to choose, but events will force you to make the choice quickly.

=== Wuhan Nationalist Government ===
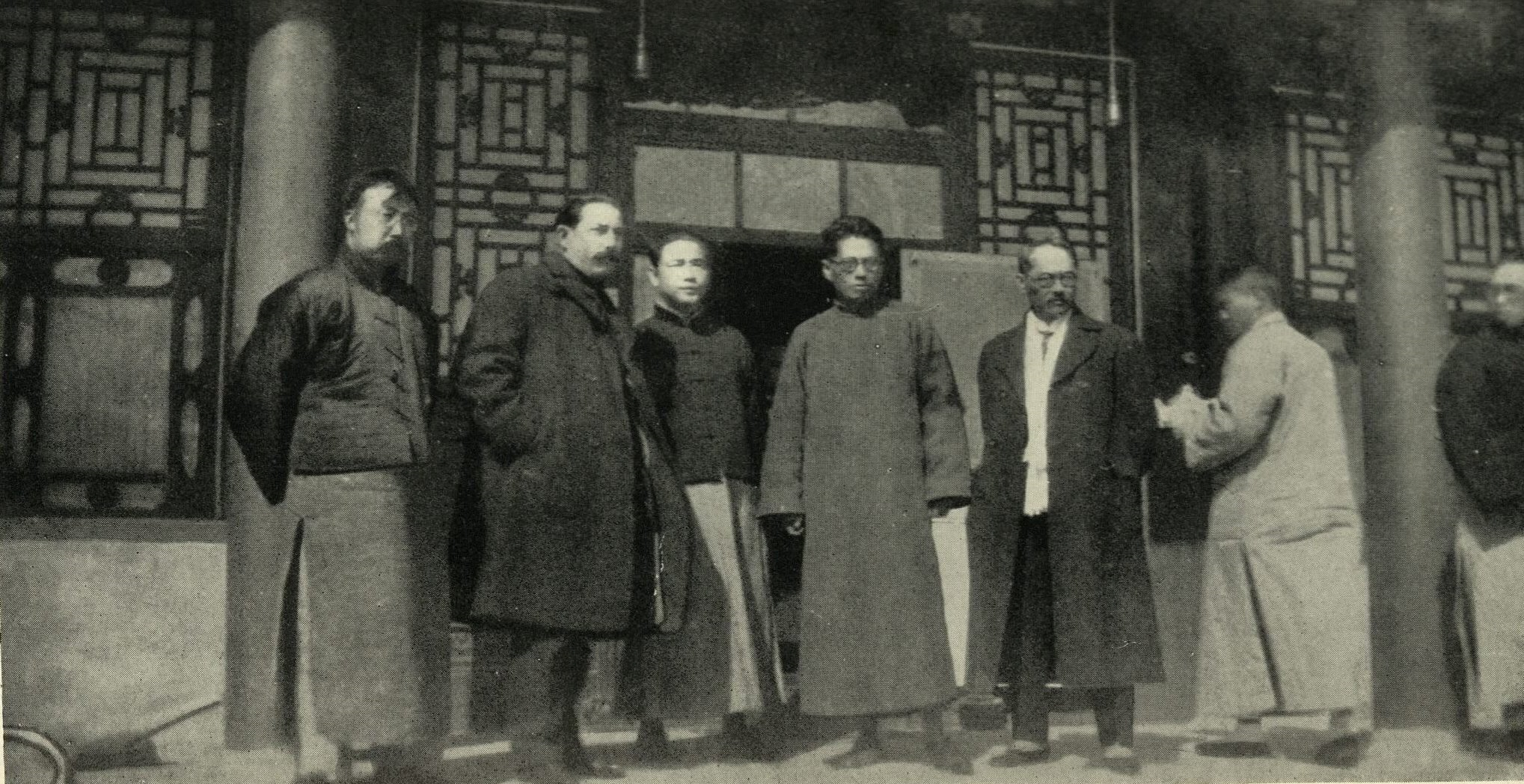
Leaders of Wuhan Nationalist government, from left to right: Mikhail Borodin (second from left), Wang Jingwei, T. V. Soong and Eugene Chen.

After the capture of Wuhan, the Central Committee of the Kuomintang voted to move to their government to this more central location. Headed in Chiang's absence by Minister of Justice Xu Qian, the executive committee was a mix of liberals and conservatives who had not been subject to Chiang's purge of leftists. They included Minister of Finance Sun Fo, Minister for Foreign Affairs Eugene Chen, and banker and industrialist T. V. Soong. When they arrived in Wuhan on December 10, the Nationalists found a city gripped by enthusiasm for the revolution. The rapidly-expanding, Communist-led labor movement staged near-constant demonstrations in Wuhan itself and across the nominally KMT-controlled territories. Although still prevented from participating in the KMT government, the CCP established parallel structures of administration in areas liberated by the NRA.

The Wuhan government proved its competency when, in January 1927, violent protests broke out in the British concession at Hankou. Eugene Chen successfully negotiated its evacuation by the British and handover to the Chinese. The Wuhan administration gradually drifted away from Chiang, becoming a center of leftist power and seeking to reassert civilian control over the military. On 10 March, the Wuhan leadership nominally stripped Chiang of much of his military authority, though refrained from deposing him as commander-in-chief. At the same time, the Communist Party became an equal partner in the Wuhan government, sharing power with the KMT leftists.

Chiang Kai-shek declined to join the rest of the KMT in Wuhan, wary of the influence the CCP had there. Instead, he stayed at his military headquarters in Nanchang and began to rally anti-Communist elements in the KMT and NRA around him. In February 1927, he launched an offensive on the last and most important cities under Sun Choufang's control: Nanjing and Shanghai. While two of Chiang's columns advanced on Shanghai, Sun was confronted with the defection of his navy and a communist general strike. On 22 March, NRA General Bai Chongxi's forces marched into Shanghai victorious. But the strike continued until Bai ordered its end on 24 March. The general disorder caused by the strike is said to have resulted in the deaths of 322 people, with 2,000 wounded, contributing to KMT feelings of unease with its rising Communist allies. The same day the Shanghai strike ended, nationalist forces entered Nanjing. Almost immediately after arrival of the NRA, mass anti-foreigner riots broke out in the city, in an event that came to be known as the Nanjing Incident. British and American naval forces were sent to evacuate their respective citizens, resulting in a naval bombardment that left the city burning and at least forty people dead. He's forces arrived on 25 March, and on the next day, Cheng and He were finally able to put an end to the violence. Although it was a mix of both Nationalists and Communist soldiers within the army who had participated in the riots, Chiang Kai-shek's faction accused Lin Boqu of planning the unrest in order to turn international opinion against the KMT. Lin, a member of both the CCP and the KMT, had been serving as political commissar of the Sixth Army, part of the forces that captured Nanjing. Whatever was responsible, the Nanjing Incident represented the culmination of tensions within the First United Front.

== First phase of the Civil War (1927–1936) ==
=== Shanghai Massacre ===
On April 12, 1927, Chiang Kai-shek and his right-wing faction of the KMT ordered the massacre of the Communists in Shanghai. The White Terror spread nationwide and the United Front collapsed. In Beijing, 19 leading Communists were killed by Zhang Zuolin. That May, tens of thousands of Communists and those suspected of being communists were killed, and the CCP lost approximately 15,000 of its 25,000 members. Only in Wuhan, where leftist sympathizer Wang Jingwei split from Chiang and proclaimed a rival nationalist government, were the Communists safe to hold their Fifth National Congress. However, under pressure from Chiang, Wang eventually purged Communists from his government and declared his loyalty to the right-wing government in Nanjing.

=== Failed insurrections and the Chinese Soviet ===
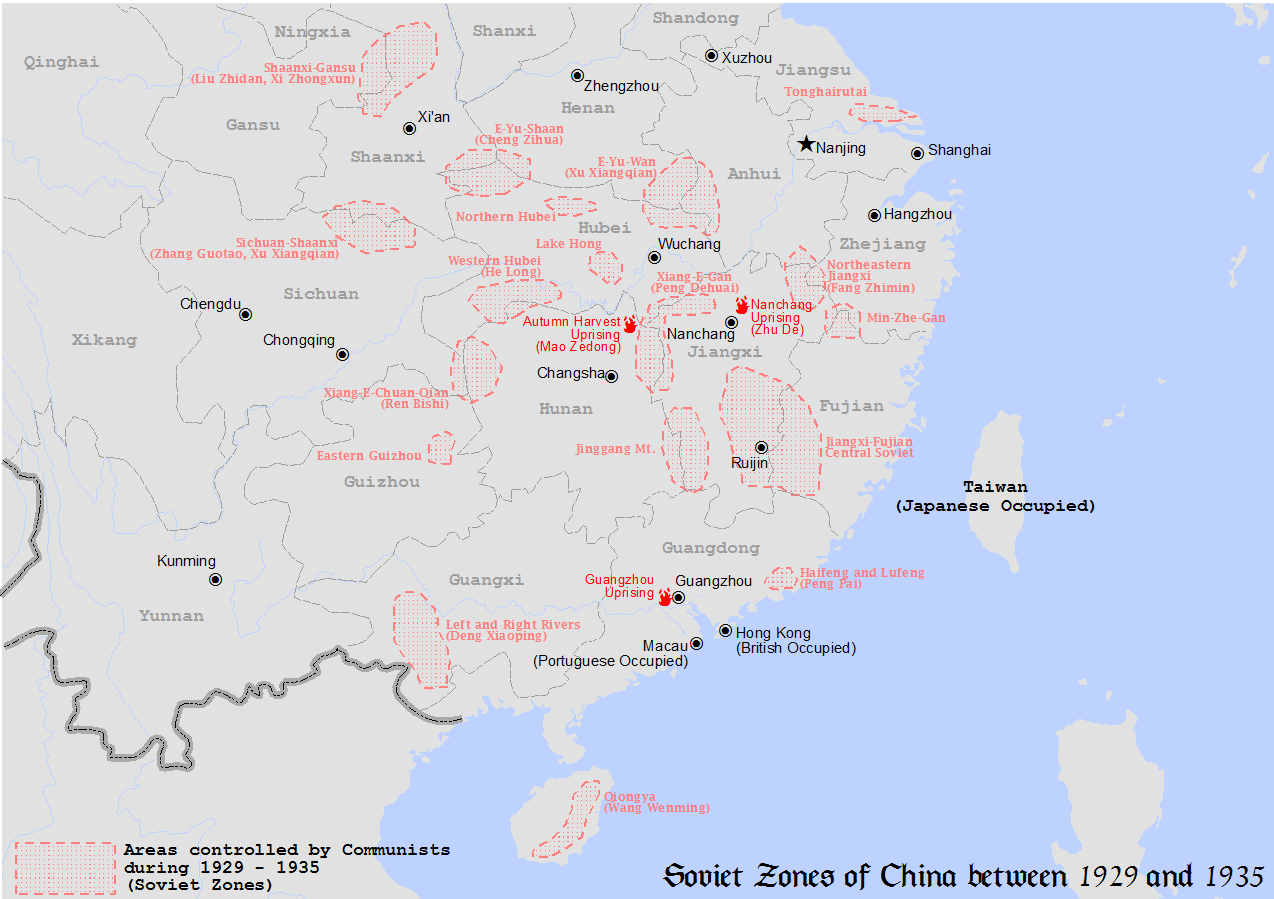
After the Shanghai Massacre, the Communists retreated to the countryside and began a series of rural insurgencies, organized as soviets.

In 1927, immediately after the collapse of Wang Jingwei's leftist Kuomintang government in Wuhan and Chiang Kai-shek's suppression of communists, the CCP attempted a series of uprisings and military mutinies in Guangzhou, Nanchang and Hunan. Despite initial success they were unable to withstand direct pressure from the NRA. The immediate effect was to make it clear to CCP leaders that a formal military apparatus was needed, and during the flight from Nanchang they founded the Chinese Red Army.

The defeat left an opening for machinations within the party leadership. In late 1927, Xiang Zhongfa was sent as the CCP's representative to celebrations of the Bolshevik Revolution's 10th Anniversary. While in Moscow, Xiang was able to convince the Soviet leadership to hold the CCP's 6th Party Congress there, rather than in China. With the help of the 28 Bolsheviks, Chinese students studying Marxism at the Moscow Sun Yat-sen University, Xiang replaced Chen Duxiu as general secretary to the dismay of CCP leaders back in China. Upon his return to Shanghai, Xiang attempted several bureaucratic changes to consolidate centralized power, with mixed success. In 1930, the Comintern began pressuring the CCP to conduct more "anti-rightist" actions and Li Lisan was promoted to propaganda chief. Li grew to become the effective paramount leader with support from Xiang and advocated for an immediate armed uprising in the cities. This was attempted in July 1930, but failed and again led to heavy losses.

Eventually, the Communist insurgents were defeated and the CCP was forced to withdraw northwards in the Long March.

After learning of the disastrous results of Li's offensives, the Comintern sent Zhou Enlai and Qu Qiubai back from Moscow to moderate Li. When this failed, the Comintern summoned Li to Moscow in October 1930. Bo Gu became nominal party secretary while Wang Ming became the de facto paramount leader. Under the influence of Moscow, the strategy of direct confrontation with the KMT by organizing urban uprisings continued until 1933, when party leadership was finally forced to evacuate to the countryside. They fled to Jiangxi, where Mao Zedong had had considerable success in setting up the Chinese Soviet Republic. Established in November 1931, the Soviet had helped expand CCP membership to over 300,000 and supported 100,000 Red Army soldiers. Mao's guerilla tactics had successfully repulsed three KMT encirclement campaigns. The CCP leadership quickly took over from Mao when they arrived from Shanghai. Following the advice of Otto Braun, they replaced cautious guerilla tactics with a more traditional military strategy. The subsequent fourth encirclement campaign was a disaster for the Communists, and forced them to abandon South China altogether. They began the Long March, a 9,000 kilometer retreat to Northern China, where Chiang Kai-shek's authority was weaker. In January 1935, the CCP paused the march to hold a conference in Zunyi. Here, Mao Zedong denounced the party leadership for its dogmatic adherence to urban revolution in the face of repeated defeats. He also criticized Otto Braun's conventional tactics. Instead, Mao put forward a strategy based on rural guerilla warfare that prioritized winning peasant support. This was controversial because it conflicted with traditional party doctrine and the line endorsed by the Comintern. But with the support of Zhou Enlai, Mao defeated the 28 Bolsheviks and Otto Braun, becoming chairman of the Politburo and de facto leader of the party. Although the party survived the Long March, it had lost about 90% of its membership and was on the brink of destruction. But the outbreak of the Second Sino-Japanese War gave the Yan'an Soviet, the communists' new base, a reprieve.

== Second Sino-Japanese War and the Second United Front ==
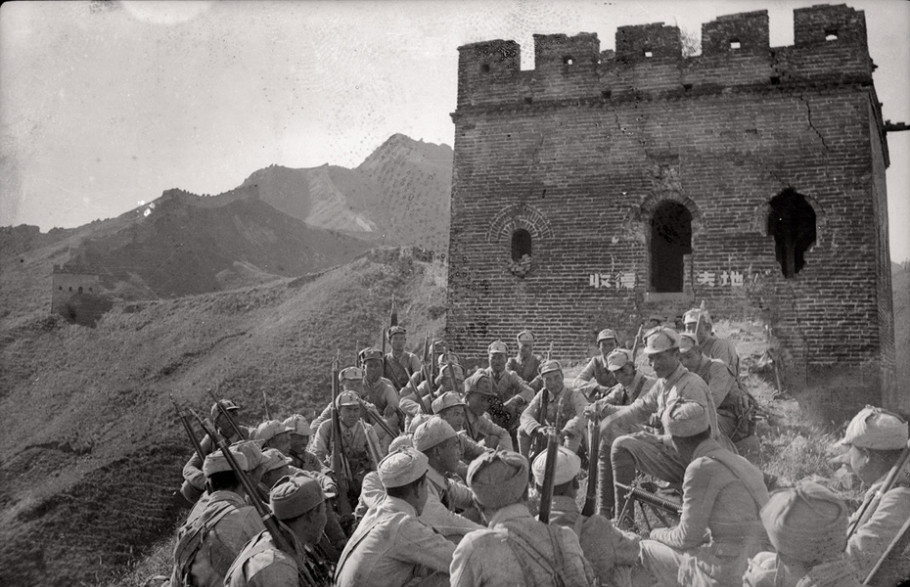
During WWII, one of the Communist units that joined the National Revolutionary Army was the Eighth Route Army, pictured here on the Great Wall.

In 1931, the Japanese army had occupied Manchuria, which had nominally been under Chinese sovereignty. This triggered debates inside China on whether the Nationalist Government of Chiang Kai-shek, the administration with the strongest claim to national leadership at the time, should declare war on Japan. Chiang, despite popular disapproval, wanted to continue to focus on wiping out the Chinese Communist Party (CCP) before opposing Japan. For this policy, Chiang adopted the slogan "first internal pacification, then external resistance". In contrast, the CCP's August 1 Declaration called for an end to civil war and a united front of all Chinese parties, organizations, overseas Chinese, and ethnic minorities against the Japanese. Chiang's policy of non-resistance to Japan contributed to a decrease in support for the Nationalists and an increase in support for the CCP.

In 1936, Chiang was arrested by two of his generals in Xi'an, who forced him to form a united front with the CCP against Japan. In return for the ceasefire, the CCP agreed to dissolve the Red Army and place their units under National Revolutionary Army command. This arrangement did not end tensions between the CCP and KMT. In January 1941, Chiang Kai-shek ordered Nationalist troops to ambush the CCP's New Fourth Army, one of the Communist armies that had been placed under Nationalist command, for alleged insubordination. The New Fourth Army incident effectively ended any substantive co-operation between the Nationalists and the CCP, although open fighting between the two sides remained sporadic throughout the war.

The war with Japan and the Second United Front created an enormous opportunity to expand CCP influence. French historian Lucien Bianco argues that before the war, the peasantry had not been ready for revolution; economic reasons were not enough to mobilize them. But the nationalism caused by the war changed the situation: "It was the war that brought the Chinese peasantry and China to revolution; at the very least, it considerably accelerated the rise of the CCP to power." The Nationalists' image had been tarnished by Chiang's original reluctance to the take on the Japanese, while the Communists willingly adopted the rhetoric of national resistance against imperialism. Using their experience in rural guerilla warfare, the Communists were able to operate behind the front lines and gain influence among the numerous peasant resistance groups set-up to fight the Japanese. In contrast with the Nationalists, the Communists undertook moderate land reform that made them extremely popular among the poorer peasants. Communist cadres worked tirelessly to organize the local population in each new village they arrived, which had the dual benefits of spreading Communist ideas and allowing for more effective administration. In the eight years of war, the CCP membership rose from 40,000 to 1,200,000. According to historian Chalmers Johnson, by the end of the war the CCP had also won the support of perhaps 100 million peasants in the regions where they had operated. The temporary truce with the Nationalists also made it possible for the Communists to once again target the urban proletariat, a policy advocated by the "internationalist" faction of the party. Led by Wang Ming, this faction advocated mobilizing labor not for revolution, but rather to support to Nationalists (at least until the war was won). Mao, in contrast, advocated continued focus on the peasantry, and ultimately managed to consolidate his position during the Yan'an Rectification Movement.

== Second Phase of Civil War (1945–1949) ==
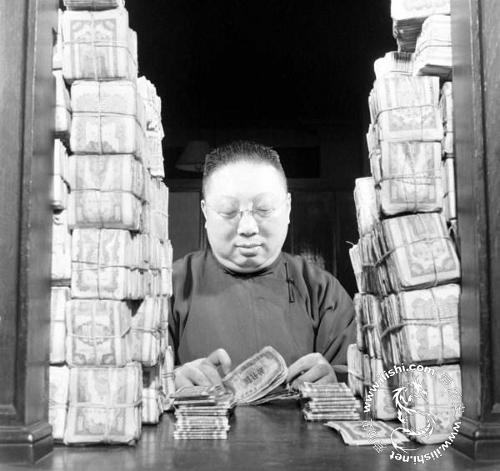
Starting in 1937 and lasting until the end of the Civil War, hyperinflation skyrocketed in the Republic of China.

=== Postwar situation ===
The impact of the war on the social and economics conditions of China had been brutal. An estimated 20 to 25 million Chinese were killed in fighting, massacres, and man-made or natural disasters. By 1946, Chinese industries operated at 20 percent capacity and had 25 percent of the output of pre-war China. The influx of cheap American goods forestalled any recovery. In order to coordinate the war effort, the Nationalist government had taken over more than 70% of Chinese industry, a dramatic increase from the 15% it owned before the war. This consolidation of wealth in the regime's hands contributed to the pervasive problem of corruption. The Nationalist currency had been undergoing hyperinflation since the beginning of the war. By 1945, retail market prices had reached 3,000% of their 1937 levels. This problem was compounded by the presence of numerous other currencies printed by the Japanese, Communists, and other local authorities. The Nationalist Government failed to curb inflation after the Japanese surrender and continued to print more currency to pay for the civil war. (Note: The Nationalists attempted two currency reforms in 1948 and 1949, but as discussed below, by then the lack of confidence in the Nationalist Government undermined the reforms' effectiveness.) Hyperinflation reduced the real wages of peasants, workers, and especially soldiers, and destroyed the savings of the upper-middle class that was Chiang's base of support.

The power of the CCP had grown considerably by the end of the Second Sino-Japanese War. The Eighth Route Army and New Fourth Army—officially still part of the NRA, but in reality under independent Communist command—counted between 1.2 and 1.27 million men. An additional 1.8 to 2.68 million militia brought the total Communist forces to between 3 million and 4 million. When the Japanese surrendered, the Communists' "Liberated Zone" grew to contain 19 base areas (mostly in north China), making up one-quarter of the country's territory and one-third of its population. In the south, the New Fourth Army had recovered from the attempted massacre of its forces and established a serious Communist presence along the banks of the Yangtze. Nonetheless, the CCP's forces were still numerically inferior to the rest of the NRA, which excluding the Communists counted around 4 million regulars and 1 million militia in its ranks. This was compounded by the Communists' lack of war material like trucks, artillery, and other heavy weaponry. For most of the war the Communists had operated in rural areas without factories or support from the Allies, which the Kuomintang received in abundance. As Mao Zedong said to an American Colonel David D. Barrett, the Communists had an army based on "millet plus rifles."

The international situation for the Communists was unfavorable in 1945. At Yalta, the Allies had agreed to recognize USSR claims in the Far East in exchange for a Soviet declaration of war on Japan. These claims included control of Port Arthur and joint control over the Chinese Eastern Railway, which Chiang reluctantly accepted in return for Soviet recognition of the KMT as the sole legitimate government of China. In that way, the Communists appeared to have lost their most likely ally. The American Dixie Mission had investigated the possibility of American support for the Communists, but although its findings were favorable, cooperation was stubbornly blocked by American Ambassador Patrick J. Hurley. Hurley and the powerful pro-Nationalist China Lobby orchestrated the recall or dismissal of American "China Hands" who favored cutting ties with the Nationalists or supporting the Communists, including John Service, Joseph Stilwell, and David Barrett. By mid-1945, the United States was firmly committed to supporting Chiang. According to William Blum, American aid included substantial amounts of mostly surplus military supplies, and loans were made to the KMT. In the two years following the Sino-Japanese War, the KMT had received $4.43 billion from the US—most of which was military aid.

=== Japanese surrender and attempted negotiations ===
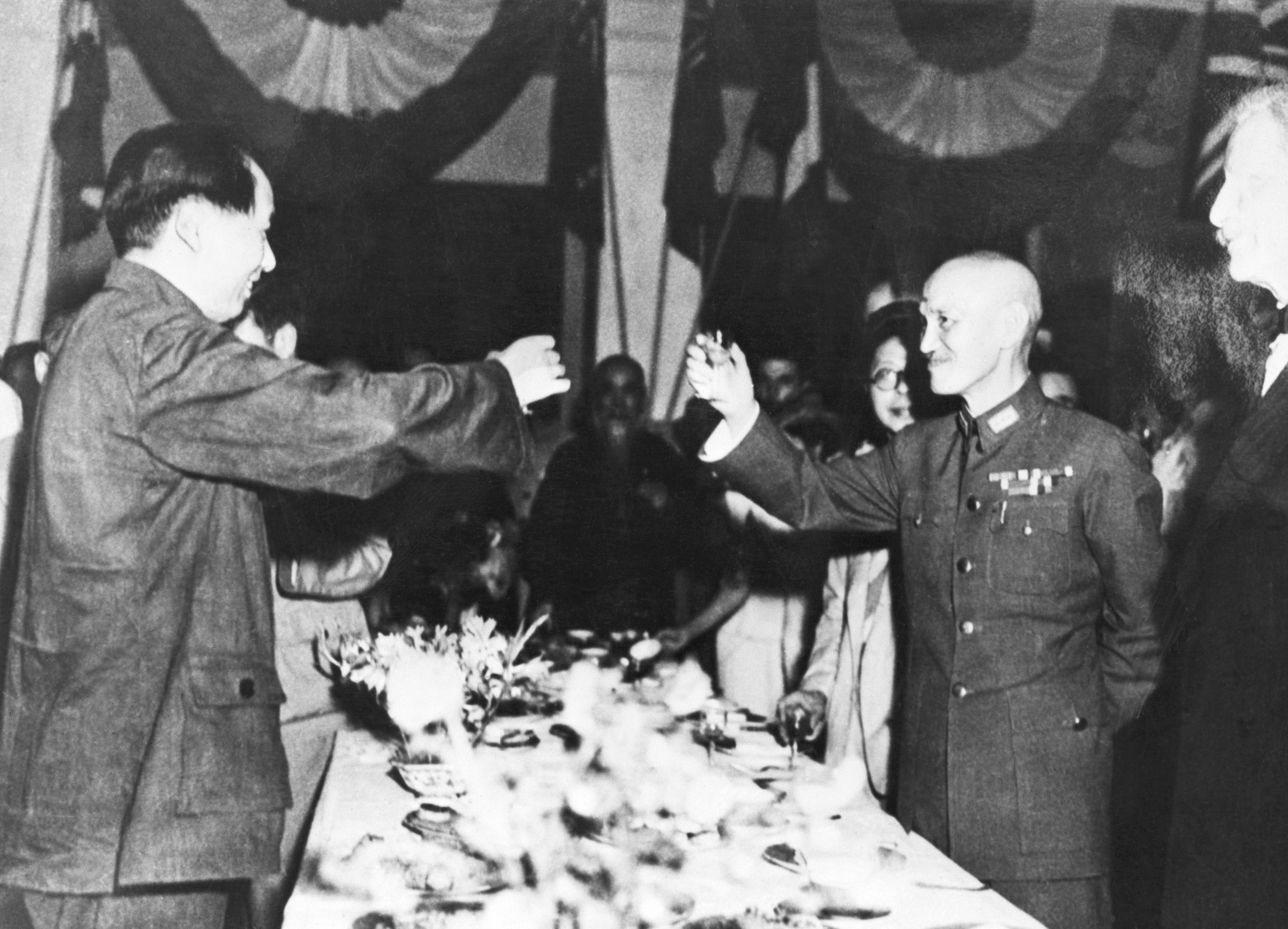
Mao and Chiang Kai-shek toast to victory over Japan in Chongqing, during negotiations.

On August 8, 1945, the Soviet Union invaded Manchuria, immediately altering the military situation in China. The Soviet invasion, among other contemporary developments, made Japan's defeat inevitable. Both the Kuomintang and the Chinese Communist Party immediately ordered their forces to take as much territory from the Japanese as possible, which would yield not just land, but also weapons and equipment from the defeated Japanese units. Although Chiang Kai-shek was confident that he was in a strong position to win a civil war against the CCP, he also knew that if the Communists gained control of Japanese materiel, the balance of power would change. In order to buy time, and under American pressure to negotiate, Chiang Kai-shek reached out to Mao Zedong with a request that the latter fly to Chongqing to negotiate. At first, Mao demanded that Chiang grant the CCP certain conditions, but sustained pressure from Joseph Stalin made him realize the extent of the CCP's international isolation. On August 23, Mao told the Politburo that without Soviet backing, the CCP would have to make concessions to Chiang.

Meanwhile, military forces on all sides continued their maneuvers. On the 20th, the last Japanese units in Manchuria surrendered to the Soviet Red Army. On the 26th, the CCP authorized army units and cadres to begin infiltrating the Manchurian countryside (a move tolerated by the Soviets). CCP dominance in northern China seriously concerned Chiang, who was not in a position to stop the CCP from taking Beiping or Tianjin. Chiang Kai-shek ordered the Japanese troops to remain at their post to receive the Kuomintang and not surrender their arms to the Communists. Chiang called on the Americans for assistance, and the United States landed more than 50,000 marines in northern China to occupy the major cities until the Nationalists could arrive. Although greeted with enthusiasm, incidents such as the rape of a Chinese student quickly turned the population against the Americans and contributed to growing support for the Communists. The Americans were anxious to have the Nationalists take over their duties, and so General Wedemeyer further ordered the airlifting of 100,000 Nationalist troops into Northern China. As Nationalist troops moved in to formerly occupied territories, looting and large-scale corruption were common. Under the pretext of "receiving the Japanese surrender," business interests within the KMT government occupied most of the banks, factories and commercial properties, which had previously been seized by the Imperial Japanese Army. They also conscripted troops at an accelerated pace from the civilian population and hoarded supplies, preparing for a resumption of war with the Communists. These harsh and unpopular measures caused great hardship for the residents of cities such as Shanghai, where the unemployment rate rose dramatically to 37.5%. The Communists abstained from trying to take and hold any major cities (with the exception of Jinzhou), focusing instead on gaining control over the countryside. Nevertheless, as Mao left for negotiations he simultaneously ordered the Shangdang Campaign to defeat as many KMT units in Shanxi as possible and thereby gain a stronger hand at the negotiating table.

During negotiations, Chiang's main offer was to move from the second stage of Sun Yat-Sen's stages of unification (KMT tutelage) to the third stage (constitutional government). Mao and Zhou Enlai, on the other hand, were willing to recognize Chiang as de jure President of China in return for de facto autonomy in the provinces of Shanxi, Shandong, Hebei, Rehe, and Chahar. They would be willing to join and support a KMT-led coalition government, but wanted to maintain separate armed forces in their provinces. Both sides criticized the other as unreasonable. Chiang viewed the degree of local autonomy requested by the Communists as a regression to the Warlord Era, and was not willing to sacrifice his goal of reunification. The CCP, on the other hand, suspected they would be massacred if they laid down their arms. Both sides eventually signed the Double Tenth Agreement, but this was mostly for show and the major issues were left unresolved. Negotiations between Chiang and Zhou would continue in Nanjing, but Mao returned to the Yan'an Soviet.

The outbreak of fighting in Manchuria (see next section) proved to Ambassador Hurley that negotiations had failed, and he resigned in disgust. He was replaced by General George Marshall, who arrived in China on 20 December 1945. The goal of the Marshall Mission was to bring both parties into a coalition government, with the hope that a strong, non-Communist China would act as a bulwark against the encroachment of the Soviet Union. Marshall drew both sides into negotiations which would drag on for more than a year. No significant agreements were reached, as both sides used the time to further prepare themselves for the ensuing conflict.

=== Manchurian Campaigns, 1946–1948 ===
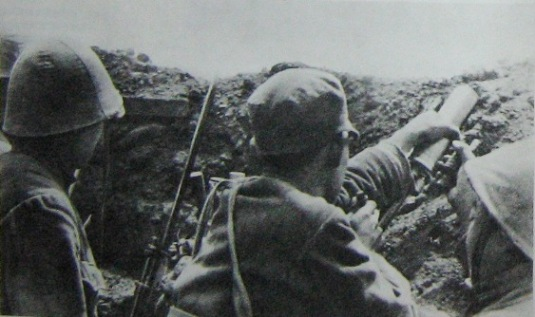
Communist soldiers wait in trenches during the Campaign to Defend Siping, 1946.

By the time that Nationalist units had been able to arrive in the major cities of northeastern China, Communist forces commanded by Lin Biao were already in firm control of most of the countryside and surrounding areas, including the city of Jinzhou. On 15 November 1945, the Nationalists began a campaign to roll back these gains. Chiang Kai-shek's forces pushed as far as Jinzhou by 26 November 1945, meeting with little resistance. Rather than confront the advancing Nationalists head on, Lin Biao avoided decisive confrontations, and in doing so was able to preserve the strength of his army. The Nationalist advance also prompted Stalin, who did not want the CCP entirely crushed, to command Marshal Rodion Malinovsky to give most captured Japanese weapons to the CCP. This was decisive; from this point onwards the Communist forces were no longer just an army of "millet plus rifles".

In March 1946, despite repeated requests from Chiang Kai-shek, the Soviet Red Army under the command of Marshal Rodion Malinovsky continued to delay pulling out of Manchuria, while Malinovsky secretly told the CCP forces to move in behind them. Mao quickly seized the opportunity, ordering Lin Biao and Zhu De to begin taking key cities, including Siping and Harbin. These favourable conditions also facilitated many changes inside the Communist leadership: the more radical faction who wanted a complete military take-over of China finally gained the upper hand and defeated the careful opportunists. By 3 May, all Soviet troops had withdrawn, and fighting between local Communist and Nationalist forces had broken out in earnest. The conflict would escalate to the scale of a nation-wide civil war over the summer, as Chiang Kai-shek launched a large-scale assault on Communist territory in north China with 113 brigades (a total of 1.6 million troops).

Knowing their disadvantages in manpower and equipment, the CCP adopted a "passive defence" strategy. It avoided the strong points of the KMT army and was prepared to abandon territory in order to preserve its forces. In most cases the surrounding countryside and small towns had come under Communist influence long before the cities. The CCP also attempted to wear out the KMT forces as much as possible. This tactic seemed to be successful; after a year, the power balance became more favorable to the CCP. They wiped out 1.12 million KMT troops, while their strength grew to about two million men. In March 1947 the KMT achieved a symbolic victory by seizing Yan'an, the capital of the Yan'an Soviet. The Communists counterattacked soon afterwards; on 30 June 1947 CCP troops crossed the Yellow River and moved to the Dabie Mountains, restored and developed the Central Plain. At the same time, Communist forces also began to counterattack in Northeastern China, North China and East China.

=== The Three Campaigns, 1948–1949 ===
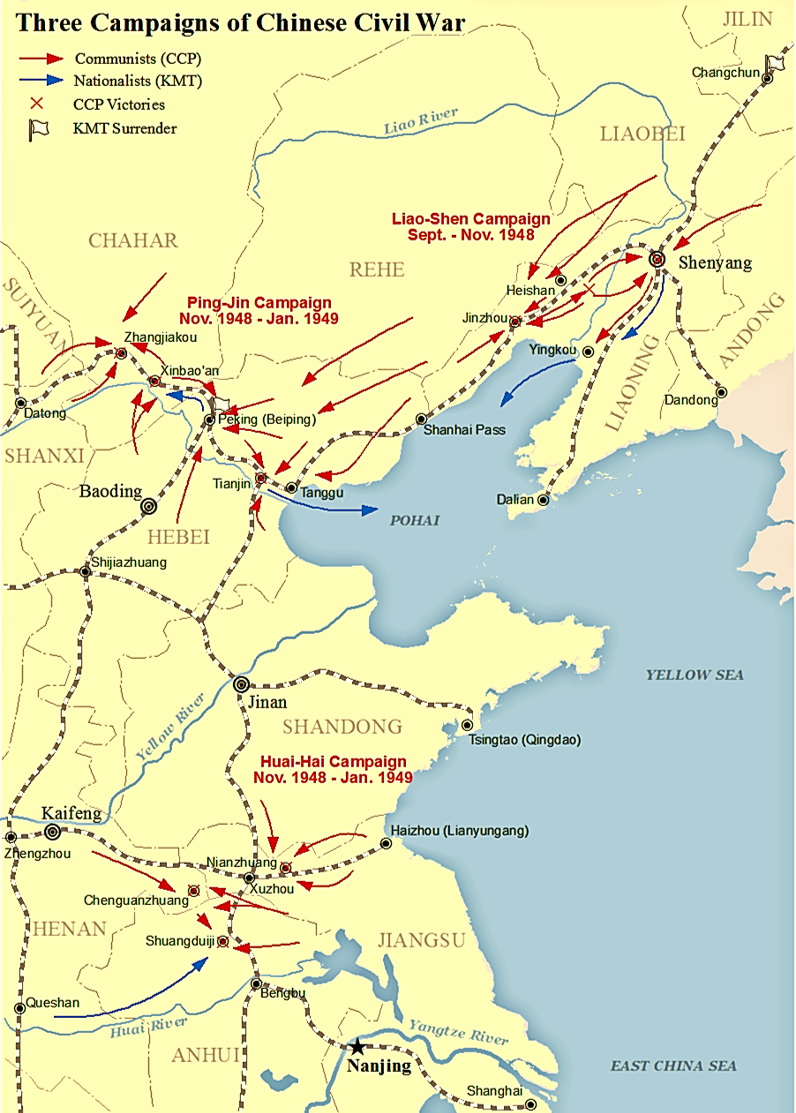
Map showing the Liaoshen, Huaihai, and Pingjin Campaigns that decisively turned the war in favour of the CCP.

In late 1948, the CCP and the newly rechristened "People's Liberation Army" (PLA) launched the decisive Liaoshen Campaign. The PLA finally captured for good the northern cities of Shenyang and Changchun and consolidated control of the Northeast. The New 1st Army, regarded as the best KMT army, was forced to surrender after the CCP conducted a brutal six-month siege of Changchun that resulted in more than 150,000 civilian deaths from starvation.

The conscripted peasants who filled the Nationalist ranks also were beginning to defect to the PLA in larger and larger numbers, drawn by the promise of land and much better treatment by Communist officers. The defection and capture of large numbers of well-trained KMT troops finally gave the PLA material superiority over the Nationalist army. Manpower continued to grow as well; during the Huaihai Campaign alone the CCP was able to mobilize 5,430,000 peasants to fight against the KMT forces.

Now with tanks, heavy artillery, and other combined-arms assets, the PLA was prepared to execute offensive operations south of the Great Wall. In April 1948 the city of Luoyang fell, cutting the KMT army off from Xi'an. Following a fierce battle, the CCP captured Jinan and Shandong province on 24 September 1948. The Huaihai Campaign of late 1948 and early 1949 secured east-central China for the CCP. The outcome of these encounters were decisive for the military outcome of the civil war. The Pingjin Campaign resulted in the Communist conquest of northern China. It lasted 64 days, from 21 November 1948 to 31 January 1949. The PLA suffered heavy casualties while securing Zhangjiakou, Tianjin along with its port and garrison at Taku and Beijing (then "Beiping"). The CCP brought 890,000 troops from the northeast to oppose some 600,000 KMT troops. There were 40,000 PLA casualties at Zhangjiakou alone. They in turn killed, wounded or captured some 520,000 KMT during the campaign.

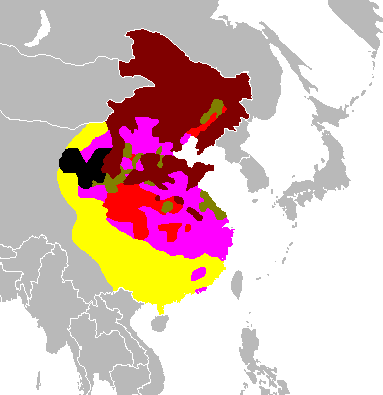
Areas colored yellow represent the final expansion of the CCP after the three campaigns and prior to the formal establishment of the People's Republic of China.

After achieving decisive victory at Liaoshen, Huaihai and Pingjin campaigns, the CCP wiped out 144 regular and 29 irregular KMT divisions, including 1.54 million veteran KMT troops, which significantly reduced the strength of Nationalist forces. Stalin initially favored a coalition government in postwar China, and tried to persuade Mao to stop the CCP from crossing the Yangtze and attacking the KMT positions south of the river. Mao rejected Stalin's position and on 21 April, began the Yangtze River Crossing Campaign. On 23 April they captured the KMT's capital, Nanjing. The KMT government retreated to Canton (Guangzhou) until 15 October, Chongqing until 25 November, and then Chengdu before retreating to Taiwan on 7 December. By late 1949 the People's Liberation Army was pursuing remnants of KMT forces southwards in southern China, and only Tibet was left. A Chinese Muslim Hui cavalry regiment, the 14th Dungan Cavalry, was sent by the Chinese government to attack Mongol and Soviet positions along the border in the Battle of Baitag Bogd.

== Establishment of the People's Republic ==
The founding of the Central People's Government of China was formally proclaimed by Chairman Mao Zedong on October 1, 1949, at 3:00 pm in Tiananmen Square in Beijing, the new capital. The new national flag of the People's Republic of China (the Five-starred Red Flag) was officially unveiled and hoisted to a 21-gun salute. The ceremony was followed by a PLA military parade. Commanded by Nie Rongzhen, the Commander of the Northern China Military Region and inspected by Zhu De, the Commander-in-Chief of the PLA, the parade involved around 16,000 PLA officers and personnel. The parade, which was approved in June 1949, was the first large-scale and modern Chinese military parade, with the country having never done a public review of troops before under previous governments. Liu Bocheng proposed to parade directors Yang Chengwu and Tang Yanjie be organized in the Soviet format, having personally witnessed a military parade on Red Square in Moscow. The Northern Military Region Band (now the Central Military Band of the PLA) provided musical accompaniment which included the Military Anthem of the People's Liberation Army and new national anthem of China, the March of the Volunteers.

== Aftermath and legacy ==
Badge of MAAG ROC in Vietnam War.

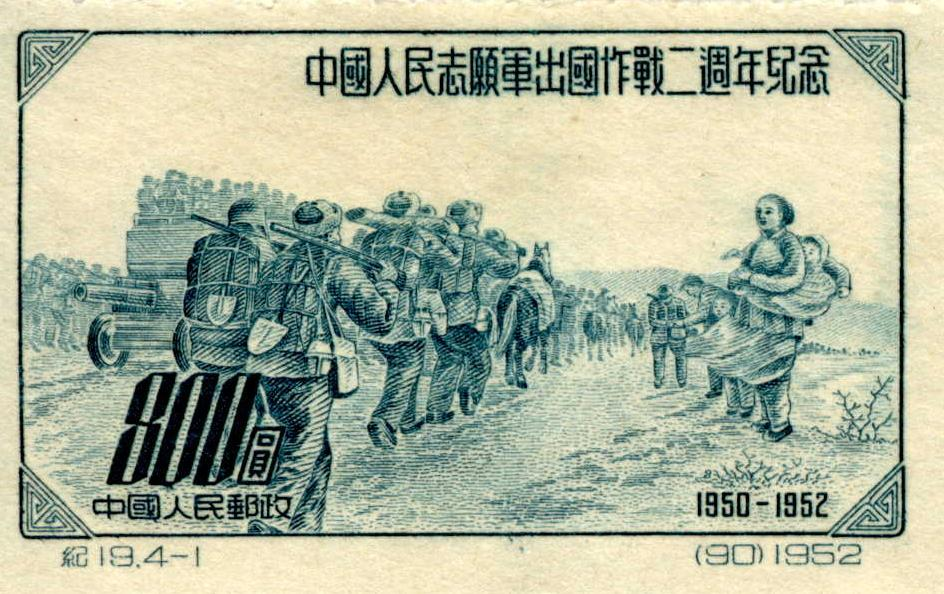
Chinese troops in Korea depicted on a 1952 Chinese postage stamp

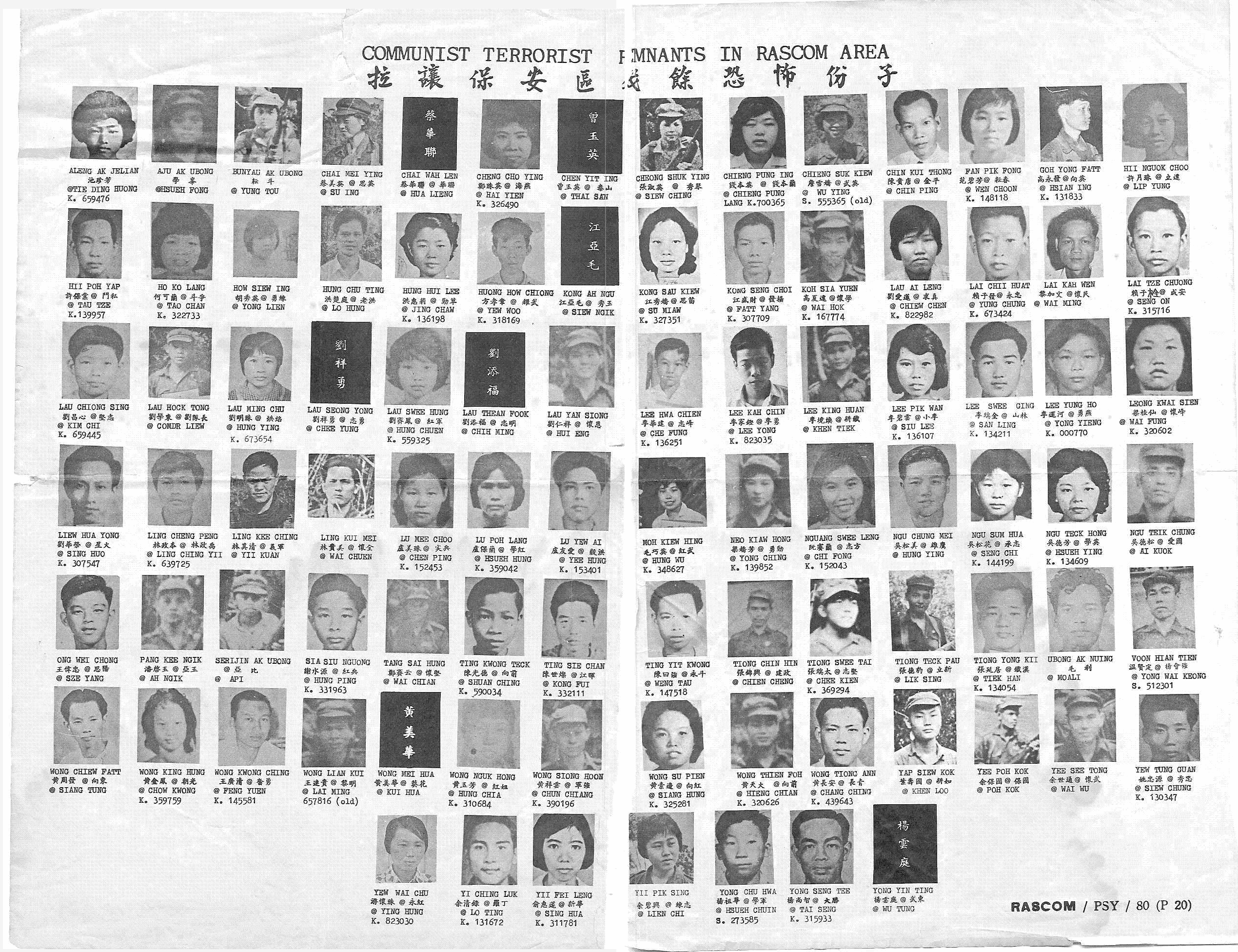
Poster of Chinese rebels in Sarawak, Malaysia.

On October 1, 1949, Chairman Mao Zedong officially proclaimed the founding of the People's Republic of China at Tiananmen Square. Chiang Kai-shek, 600,000 Nationalist troops and about two million Nationalist-sympathizer refugees retreated to the island of Taiwan. After that, resistance to the Communists on the mainland was substantial but scattered, such as in the far south. An attempt to take the Nationalist-controlled island of Kinmen was thwarted in the Battle of Kuningtou.

In December 1949 Chiang proclaimed Taipei, Taiwan the temporary capital of the Republic, and continued to assert his government as the sole legitimate authority of all China, while the PRC government continued to call for the unification of all China. The last direct fighting between Nationalist and Communist forces ended with the Communist capture of Hainan Island in April 1950, though shelling and guerrilla raids continued for several years.

In June 1950, the outbreak of the Korean War led the United States government to place the United States Seventh Fleet in the Taiwan Strait to prevent either side from attacking the other. However, the CCP and Kuomintang kept clashing in Southeast Asia during the Cold War.

The Kuomintang also made several last-ditch attempts to use Khampa troops against the Communists in southwest China. The Kuomintang formulated a plan in which three Khampa divisions would be assisted by the Panchen Lama to oppose the Communists. Kuomintang intelligence reported that some Tibetan tusi chiefs and the Khampa Su Yonghe controlled 80,000 troops in Sichuan, Qinghai and Tibet. They hoped to use them against the Communist army.

== See also ==
- Outline of the Chinese Civil War
- Timeline of the Chinese Civil War
- Aftermath of World War II
- Loss of China
- John F. Melby
- Cultural Revolution
