= Ningdu County =

Ningdu 宁都县 Ningtu
- County
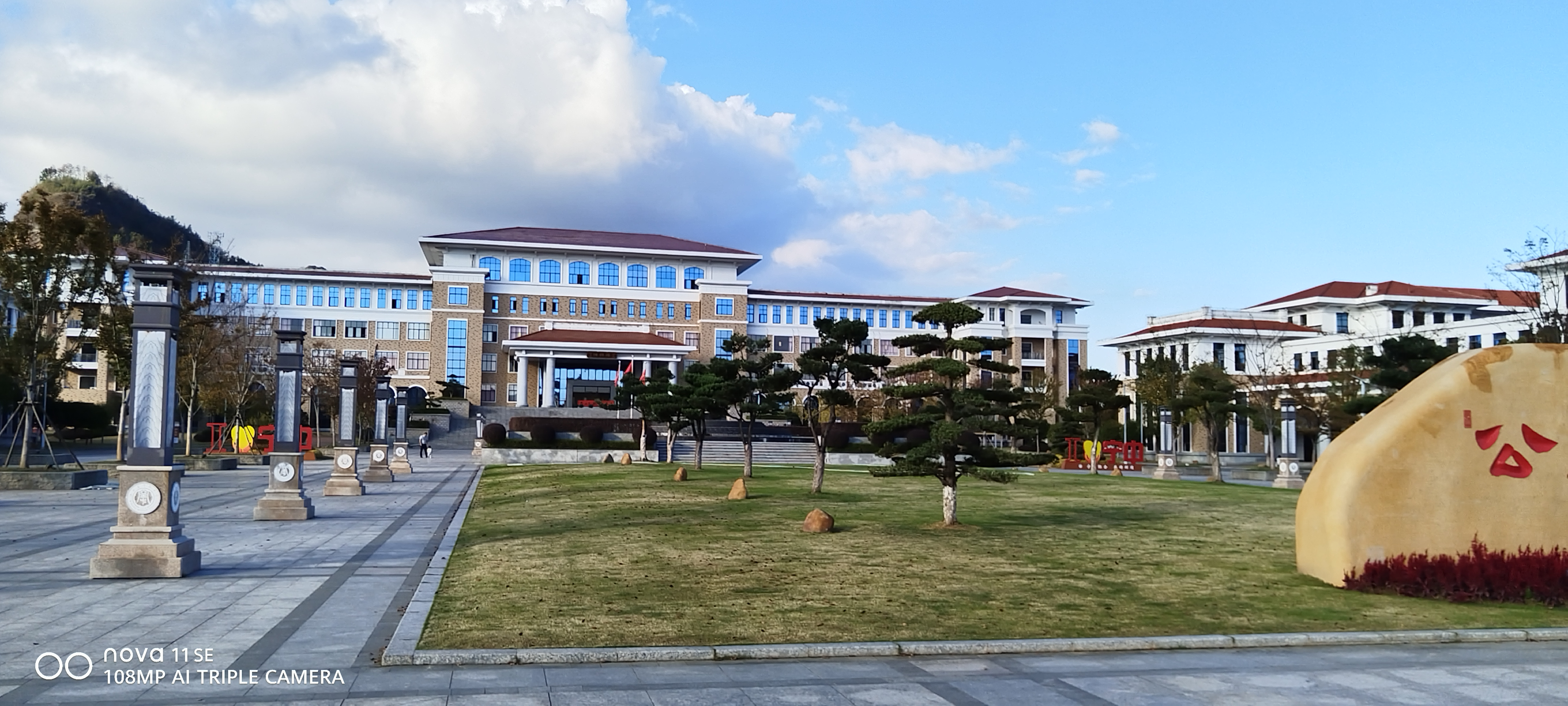

- Location in Jiangxi
- Coordinates: 26°28′12″N 116°00′32″E
- Country: People's Republic of China
- Province: Jiangxi
- Prefecture-level city: Ganzhou

Area
  - Total: 4,053.16 km^{2} (1,564.93 sq mi)

Population
  - Total: 846,200 (registered population at the end of 2,019)
  - Density: 209/km^{2} (540/sq mi)
- Postal Code: 342800

Ningdu County
- Traditional Chinese: 寧都縣
- Simplified Chinese: 宁都县
Transcriptions
Standard Mandarin
- Hanyu Pinyin: Níngdū Xiàn
- Wade–Giles: Ning2-tu1 hsien4

Ningdu County (Chinese: 宁都县) is a county in the southeast of Jiangxi province, People's Republic of China. It is the northernmost county-level division under the administration of the prefecture-level city of Ganzhou.

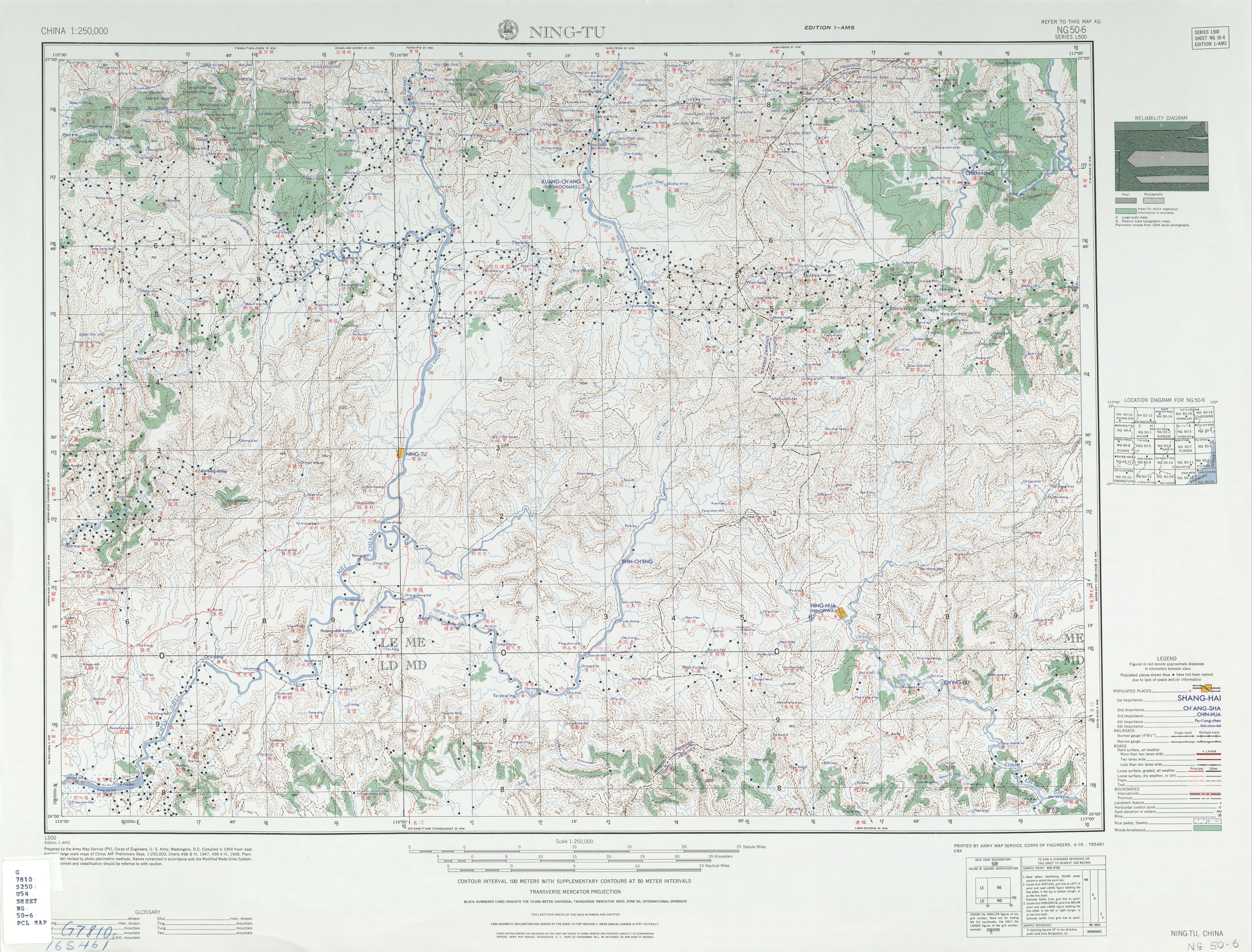
Map including Ningdu (labeled as NING-TU 寧都) (AMS, 1954)

The village of Xiaoyuan in Ningdu County was the site of the 1932 Ningdu Conference of the Chinese Communist Party during which Mao Zedong was removed from his leadership positions.

== Administrative divisions ==
In the present, Ningdu County has 12 towns and 12 townships.

12 towns

- Meijiang (梅江镇)
- Qingtang (青塘镇)
- Changsheng (长胜镇)
- Huangpi (黄陂镇)
- Gucun (固村镇)
- Laicun (赖村镇)
- Shishang (石上镇)
- Dongshanba (东山坝镇)
- Luokou (洛口镇)
- Xiaobu (小布镇)
- Huangshi (黄石镇)
- Tiantou (田头镇)

12 townships

- Zhuze (竹笮乡)
- Duifang (对坊乡)
- Guhou (固厚乡)
- Tianbu (田埠乡)
- Huitong (会同乡)
- Zhantian (湛田乡)
- Anfui (安福乡)
- Dongshao (东韶乡)
- Xiaotian (肖田乡)
- Diaofeng (钓峰乡)
- Dagu (大沽乡)
- Caijiang (蔡江乡)

== Climate ==
Climate data for Ningdu, elevation 209 m (686 ft), (1991–2020 normals, extremes 1981–present)
Month	Jan	Feb	Mar	Apr	May	Jun	Jul	Aug	Sep	Oct	Nov	Dec	Year
Record high °C (°F)	26.6 (79.9)	30.7 (87.3)	33.0 (91.4)	34.7 (94.5)	35.9 (96.6)	37.5 (99.5)	40.0 (104.0)	40.2 (104.4)	37.9 (100.2)	36.7 (98.1)	32.6 (90.7)	27.2 (81.0)	40.2 (104.4)
Mean daily maximum °C (°F)	12.1 (53.8)	15.0 (59.0)	18.2 (64.8)	24.4 (75.9)	28.4 (83.1)	30.9 (87.6)	34.2 (93.6)	33.6 (92.5)	30.8 (87.4)	26.3 (79.3)	20.8 (69.4)	14.8 (58.6)	24.1 (75.4)
Daily mean °C (°F)	7.6 (45.7)	10.2 (50.4)	13.6 (56.5)	19.4 (66.9)	23.5 (74.3)	26.3 (79.3)	28.8 (83.8)	28.2 (82.8)	25.5 (77.9)	20.7 (69.3)	15.2 (59.4)	9.5 (49.1)	19.0 (66.3)
Mean daily minimum °C (°F)	4.6 (40.3)	7.0 (44.6)	10.5 (50.9)	15.9 (60.6)	20.0 (68.0)	23.2 (73.8)	24.9 (76.8)	24.6 (76.3)	21.9 (71.4)	16.8 (62.2)	11.4 (52.5)	5.9 (42.6)	15.6 (60.0)
Record low °C (°F)	−4.9 (23.2)	−3.3 (26.1)	−2.5 (27.5)	3.9 (39.0)	10.2 (50.4)	14.3 (57.7)	19.4 (66.9)	18.9 (66.0)	13.4 (56.1)	4.3 (39.7)	−0.4 (31.3)	−7.5 (18.5)	−7.5 (18.5)
Average precipitation mm (inches)	73.7 (2.90)	102.8 (4.05)	205.6 (8.09)	203.5 (8.01)	285.6 (11.24)	348.4 (13.72)	169.2 (6.66)	173.9 (6.85)	79.4 (3.13)	62.1 (2.44)	84.6 (3.33)	58.3 (2.30)	1,847.1 (72.72)
Average precipitation days (≥ 0.1 mm)	11.6	13.0	18.4	17.2	18.0	17.7	12.3	13.8	8.5	6.1	8.3	8.6	153.5
Average snowy days	1.2	1.2	0.2	0	0	0	0	0	0	0	0	0.6	3.2
Average relative humidity (%)	77	78	81	79	79	80	73	76	75	71	75	73	76
Mean monthly sunshine hours	84.1	83.3	80.0	104.4	126.5	140.3	241.1	217.1	177.2	166.2	136.1	125.2	1,681.5
Percentage possible sunshine	25	26	21	27	30	34	57	54	48	47	42	39	38
Source: China Meteorological Administration
