= Shucheng County =

Shucheng 舒城县
- County
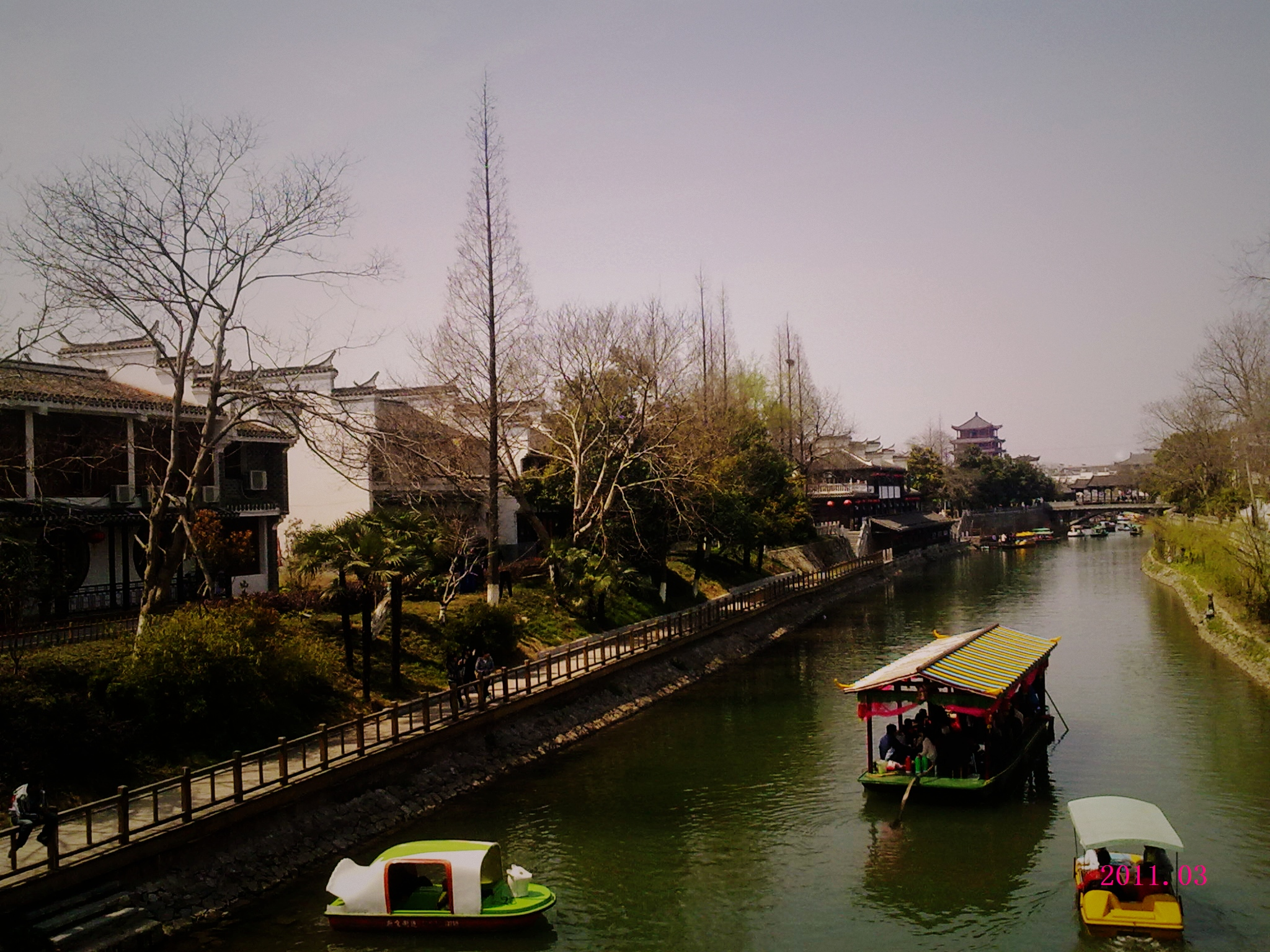

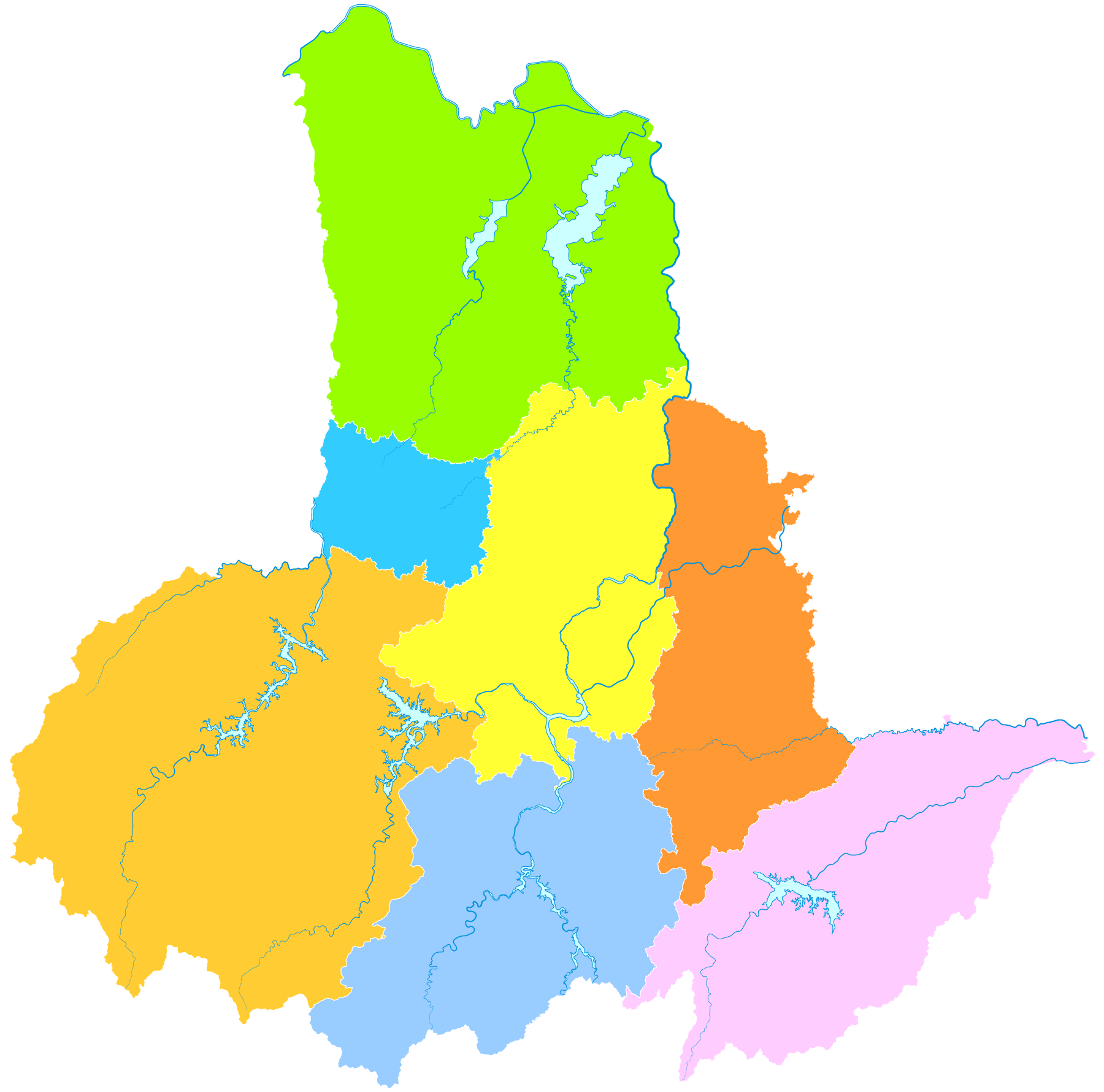
- Shucheng is the division at the southeastern corner in this map of Lu'an

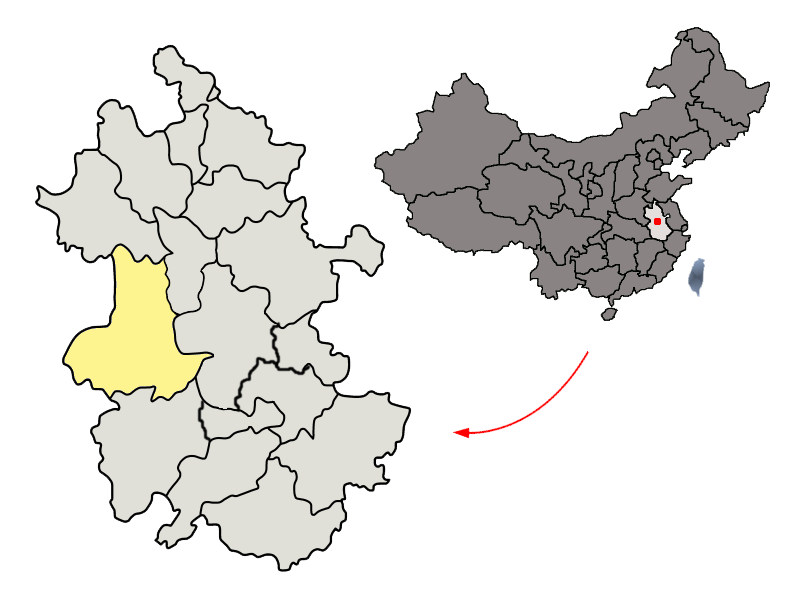
- Lu'an in Anhui
- Coordinates: 31°27′43″N 116°56′56″E
- Country: People's Republic of China
- Province: Anhui
- Prefecture-level city: Lu'an

Area
  - Total: 2,100 km^{2} (810 sq mi)

Population (2019)
  - Total: 998,700
  - Density: 480/km^{2} (1,200/sq mi)
- Time zone: UTC+8 (China Standard)
- Postal code: 231300

Shucheng County (simplified Chinese: 舒城县; traditional Chinese: 舒城縣; pinyin: Shūchéng Xiàn) is a county in the west-central part of Anhui Province, People's Republic of China. It is located in the southeastern corner of the prefecture-level city of Lu'an and is its easternmost county-level division. It has a population of 1,020,000 (up to the end of 2010) and an area of 2,092 square kilometres (808 sq mi). The government of Shucheng County is located in Chengguan Town.

Shucheng County has jurisdiction over 21 towns and townships, 1 resort center and 1 economic development district.

== Administrative divisions ==
In the present, Shucheng County has 15 towns and 6 townships.

15 Towns

- Chengguan (城关镇)
- Taoxi (桃溪镇)
- Qianrenqiao (千人桥镇)
- Hangbu (杭埠镇)
- Baishenmiao (百神庙镇)
- Wuxian (五显镇)
- Nangang (南港镇)
- Shucha (舒茶镇)
- Ganchahe (干汊河镇)
- Wanfohu (万佛湖镇)
- Shanqi (山七镇)
- Xiaotian (晓天镇)
- Tangchi (汤池镇)
- Hepeng (河棚镇)
- Zhangmuqiao (张母桥镇)

6 Townships

- Chunqiu (春秋乡)
- Bolin (柏林乡)
- Quedian (阙店乡)
- Tangshu (棠树乡)
- Luzhen (庐镇乡)
- Gaofeng (高峰乡)

== Climate ==
Climate data for Shucheng, elevation 24 m (79 ft), (1991–2020 normals, extremes 1981–present)
Month	Jan	Feb	Mar	Apr	May	Jun	Jul	Aug	Sep	Oct	Nov	Dec	Year
Record high °C (°F)	21.6 (70.9)	27.2 (81.0)	35.4 (95.7)	34.7 (94.5)	37.7 (99.9)	37.2 (99.0)	39.3 (102.7)	38.8 (101.8)	37.9 (100.2)	40.1 (104.2)	29.9 (85.8)	23.7 (74.7)	40.1 (104.2)
Mean daily maximum °C (°F)	7.6 (45.7)	10.5 (50.9)	15.7 (60.3)	22.2 (72.0)	27.0 (80.6)	29.5 (85.1)	32.7 (90.9)	31.9 (89.4)	27.8 (82.0)	22.6 (72.7)	16.5 (61.7)	10.1 (50.2)	21.2 (70.1)
Daily mean °C (°F)	3.1 (37.6)	5.7 (42.3)	10.5 (50.9)	16.7 (62.1)	21.8 (71.2)	25.1 (77.2)	28.3 (82.9)	27.4 (81.3)	22.9 (73.2)	17.1 (62.8)	10.8 (51.4)	5.0 (41.0)	16.2 (61.2)
Mean daily minimum °C (°F)	−0.3 (31.5)	2.1 (35.8)	6.2 (43.2)	11.8 (53.2)	17.3 (63.1)	21.5 (70.7)	24.8 (76.6)	24.2 (75.6)	19.5 (67.1)	13.2 (55.8)	6.6 (43.9)	1.2 (34.2)	12.3 (54.2)
Record low °C (°F)	−11.7 (10.9)	−10.0 (14.0)	−3.8 (25.2)	0.1 (32.2)	6.8 (44.2)	12.5 (54.5)	17.3 (63.1)	16.4 (61.5)	10.0 (50.0)	0.5 (32.9)	−5.4 (22.3)	−15.3 (4.5)	−15.3 (4.5)
Average precipitation mm (inches)	60.6 (2.39)	65.3 (2.57)	90.0 (3.54)	96.9 (3.81)	103.7 (4.08)	172.0 (6.77)	167.8 (6.61)	144.5 (5.69)	86.0 (3.39)	59.8 (2.35)	59.2 (2.33)	41.5 (1.63)	1,147.3 (45.16)
Average precipitation days (≥ 0.1 mm)	10.1	9.9	12.2	11.0	11.5	12.0	11.4	12.4	9.4	9.0	9.1	8.2	126.2
Average snowy days	4.7	2.5	1.1	0	0	0	0	0	0	0	0.5	1.6	10.4
Average relative humidity (%)	77	77	74	73	74	80	81	83	82	80	78	76	78
Mean monthly sunshine hours	108.7	111.1	138.4	167.1	175.6	151.0	178.7	170.6	140.2	145.2	133.5	123.7	1,743.8
Percentage possible sunshine	34	35	37	43	41	36	42	42	38	42	43	40	39
Source: China Meteorological Administration
