= Millet plus rifles =

Phrase used by Mao Zedong

- Chinese: 小米加步槍
- Literal meaning: a rifle with bags of millet

Millet plus rifles (simplified Chinese: 小米加步枪; traditional Chinese: 小米加步槍; pinyin: Xiǎomǐ jiā bùqiāng), also known as "millet and rifles" or "a rifle with bags of millet", was a phrase used by Mao Zedong to describe the materials and supplies of the People's Liberation Army (PLA). The first recorded instance of Mao using this phrase is in a speech he gave at a party meeting in Yan'an. He was recalling a conversation with David D. Barrett, an American military officer sent to observe the Chinese Communist Party (CCP) forces fighting in WWII. When warned that the Americans would support Chiang Kai-Shek against the CCP if they refused to enter into a coalition government, Mao had responded:

If you Americans, sated with bread and sleep, want to curse the people and back Chiang Kai-Shek, that's your business and I won't interfere. What we have now is millet plus rifles, what you have is bread plus cannon. If you like to back Chiang Kai-shek, back him, back him as long as you want. But remember one thing. To whom does China belong? China definitely does not belong to Chiang Kai-shek, China belongs to the Chinese people. The day will surely come when you will find it impossible to back him any longer.

The phrase became well known in the west after Mao repeated it in an interview with American war correspondent Anna Louise Strong on August 6, 1946. He said:

..Take the case of China. We have only millet plus rifles to rely on, but history will finally prove that our millet plus rifles is more powerful than Chiang Kai-shek's aeroplanes plus tanks...

It reflects Mao's view that the inferior equipment of the PLA was enough to defeat the well-equipped and well-supplied Kuomintang (KMT) soldiers in the Chinese Communist Revolution, since the people of China were behind the communist cause. Millet (along with wheat), was the main food source of the Eighth Route Army during the Second Sino-Japanese War, and was considered by the soldiers to have been a mediocre foodstuff. Rifles, of course, were the main armament of the Chinese armies of that period, with the CCP mainly using those they acquired from the Soviet Union. The phrase was quickly adopted by the CCP as propaganda to heroize their underdog struggle against the KMT.

== Evaluations ==
Some scholars attribute the PLA's military from the Chinese Civil War until the Korean War as a result of the "millet plus rifles" strategy. Other researchers argue that "millet plus rifles" is merely a metaphor for the PLA's victory over the superiorly equipped Kuomintang army, and does not literally correspond to the realities of large-scale campaign, defensive, and urban offensive battles of the Civil War. Some researchers also point out that the phrase "millet plus rifles" minimizes the importance of Soviet military aid during the Civil War. Although the importance of Soviet assistance was acknowledged by Chen Yun, Hu Qiaomu, and other CCP officials, academic circles in the mainland China have minimized its impact. Most historians widely agree that the PLA entered the war at a significant material disadvantage vis-à-vis the KMT's forces. A few argue that the idea of "millet plus rifles" is a "self-made myth" by the CCP used to gain legitimacy.
