= Ningdu Conference =

The Ningdu Conference (simplified Chinese: 宁都会议; traditional Chinese: 寧都會議; pinyin: Níngdū Huìyì) was a meeting of the Chinese Communist Party (CCP) held in the Bangshan Ancestral Hall (榜山祠) in the village of Xiaoyuan (小源), Ningdu County, Jiangxi Province. The meeting took place in early October 1932 (possibly October 3–8), shortly after the successful repulsion of the Nationalists' third encirclement campaign against the Jiangxi Soviet by the communist forces.

The conference resulted in Mao Zedong's removal from his leadership positions in the military. He was replaced as commissar of the army by Zhou Enlai. Mao was not restored to central leadership until the Zunyi Conference during the Long March (in January 1935).

In the decades following the conference, the Ningdu Conference became an important symbol and reference point for Maoism and the history of the CCP.

== See also ==
- Gutian Congress (December 1929)
