= Crop share rent =

Part of a harvest paid by a tenant farmer

Crop share rent (in contrast to economic rent) is a proportion of the crop harvest (yield) to be paid by the tenant farmer to the land owner as compensation for occupying and exploiting the rented land.

This arrangement puts the landlord, like the tenant operator, at risk from variation in yields and prices. For the farm operator, crop share rent is a mechanism for sharing risks with the landlord. In relation to commodity programs for supporting prices and farm incomes, cash rent landlords do not have a beneficial interest in the commodity and are not eligible payments.

This is a private version of Community-supported agriculture but subtly different from sharecropping as practiced in Southern states of America, which was somewhat similar to serfdom or indenture, since the tenant was bound to one particular master and could not offer their services to the most generous landowner
