= Xiaotian Township =

Xiaotian Township 肖田乡
- Township
- Location in Jiangxi Xiaotian Township (China)
- Coordinates: 27°2′37″N 116°5′29″E
- Country: People's Republic of China
- Province: Jiangxi
- Prefecture-level city: Ganzhou
- County: Ningdu County
- Village-level divisions: 1 residential community, 8 villages
- Time zone: UTC+8 (China Standard)

Xiaotian Township (simplified Chinese: 肖田乡; traditional Chinese: 肖田鄉; pinyin: Xiāotián Xiāng) is a township of Ningdu County, Jiangxi province, China. As of 2023, it administers Ganjiangyuan Community (赣江源社区) and the following eight villages:

- Xiaotian Village
- Wu Village (吴村)
- Xiaoyin Village (小吟村)
- Daiyuan Village (带源村)
- Langyuan Village (朗源村)
- Meijiashan Village (美佳山村)
- Baishu Village (柏树村)
- Langji Village (朗际村)

== See also ==
- List of township-level divisions of Jiangxi
