= Xiaotian, Anhui =

Xiaotian 晓天镇
- Town
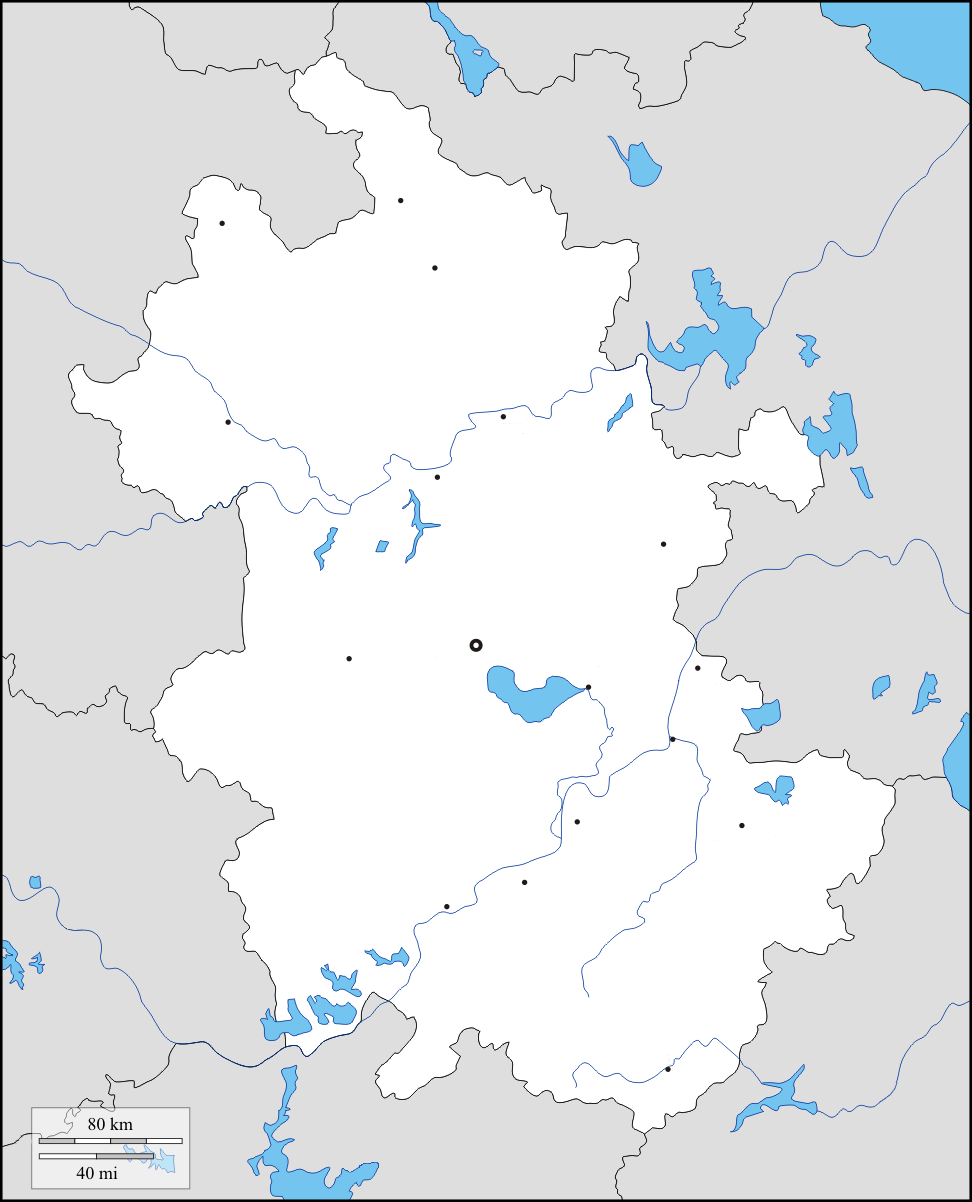
- Location in Anhui
- Coordinates: 31°11′36″N 116°35′12″E
- Country: People's Republic of China
- Province: Anhui
- Prefecture-level City: Lu'an
- County: Shucheng County
- Time zone: UTC+8 (China Standard)

Xiaotian (simplified Chinese: 晓天; traditional Chinese: 曉天; pinyin: Xiǎotiān) is a town under the administration of Shucheng County, Anhui, China. As of 2023, it administers one residential community and the following 28 villages:

- Longtan Village (龙潭村)
- Fangchong Village (方冲村)
- Sanyuan Village (三元村)
- Guochong Village (郭冲村)
- Wangchong Village (汪冲村)
- Zhuhe Village (朱河村)
- Nanyue Village (南岳村)
- Hegang Village (和岗村)
- Dahe Village (大河村)
- Zhenren Village (真仁村)
- Huangsha Village (黄沙村)
- Tiancang Village (天仓村)
- Shu'an Village (舒安村)
- Shuchuan Village (舒川村)
- Shuxing Village (舒兴村)
- Shuling Village (舒岭村)
- Baisangyuan Village (白桑园村)
- Shuanghe Village (双河村)
- Suping Village (苏平村)
- Tuoling Village (驮岭村)
- Zhangtian Village (张田村)
- Dushan Village (独山村)
- Huaihua Village (槐花村)
- Chawan Village (查湾村)
- Chuhe Village (褚河村)
- Longjing Village (龙井村)
- Dama Village (大马村)
- Taoli Village (桃李村)

== See also ==
- List of township-level divisions of Anhui
