= Provisional Government of the Republic of China =

Provisional Government of the Republic of China (中华民国临时政府; Pinyin: Zhōnghuá Mínguó Línshí Zhèngfǔ) may refer to 2 provisional governments:

- The Provisional Government of the Republic of China (1912), a provisional government established during the 1911 Revolution
- The Provisional Government of the Republic of China (1937–1940), a puppet government supported by Japan
