= Republic of China (1912–1949) =

Mainland period of the Republic of China

Republic of China 中華民國
- 1912–1949 (Note: The state did not cease to exist after 1949 but continued after its government retreated to Taiwan.)
- Top: Flag (until 1928); Bottom: Flag (from 1928); Top: Emblem (until 1928); Bottom: Emblem (from 1928)
- Anthem: List of anthems: Song of Five Races Under One Union (1912–1913); Song to the Auspicious Cloud (first version; 1913–1915); China Heroically Stands in the Universe (1915–1921); Song to the Auspicious Cloud (second version; 1921–1928); Three Principles of the People (from 1928)
- The Republic of China in 1945 Territory claimed but not controlled
- Capital: De jure: Beijing (1912–1928); Nanjing (1928–1949); De facto: Wuhan (1937–1938); Chongqing (1938–1946)
- Largest city: Shanghai
- Official languages: Standard Chinese
- Recognised national languages: Tibetan; Uyghur; Manchu; Mongolian
- Demonym: Chinese
- Government: Provisional government (1912); Beiyang government (1912–1928); Nationalist government (1928–1948); Constitutional government (from 1948)
- President
  - 1912 (first): Sun Yat-sen
  - 1949–1950 (incumbent at retreat): Yan Xishan (acting)
- Premier
  - 1912 (first): Tang Shaoyi
  - 1949–1950 (incumbent at retreat): Yan Xishan
- History
  - Xinhai Revolution: 10 October 1911 – 2 February 1912
  - Provisional government established: 1 January 1912
  - Beiyang government established: 10 March 1912
  - National Protection War: 25 December 1915 – 14 July 1916
  - Chinese Civil War starts: 1 August 1927
  - Nationalist reunification: 29 December 1928
  - Second Sino–Japanese War: 7 July 1937 – 2 September 1945
  - Constitution adopted: 20 May 1948
  - Retreat to Taiwan: 7 December 1949

Area
- 1912: 11,364,389 km^{2} (4,387,815 sq mi)
- 1946: 9,665,354 km^{2} (3,731,814 sq mi)

Population
  - 1949: 541,000,000
- Currency: Mainland China: Silver Dragon coin (1912–1935); National currency (1935–1948); Gold yuan (1948–1949); Silver yuan (1949); Taiwan: Old Taiwan dollar (1946–1949); New Taiwan dollar (from 1949)
- Time zone: UTC+5:30 to +8:30 (Kunlun to Changbai Standard Times)
Preceded by
Qing dynasty
Kiautschou Bay
Weihaiwei
Guangzhouwan
Taiwan
Succeeded by
People's Republic of China
Republic of China (Taiwan)
- Today part of: China; Mongolia; Myanmar; Russia; Vietnam; Taiwan; Tajikistan

Chinese name
- Traditional Chinese: 中華民國
- Simplified Chinese: 中华民国
Transcriptions
Standard Mandarin
- Hanyu Pinyin: Zhōnghuá Mínguó
- Bopomofo: ㄓㄨㄥ ㄏㄨㄚˊ ㄇㄧㄣˊ ㄍㄨㄛˊ
- Wade–Giles: Chung^{1}-hua^{2} Min^{2}-kuo^{2}
- Tongyong Pinyin: Jhonghua Minguo
- IPA: [ʈʂʊ́ŋ xwǎ mǐn kwǒ]
other Mandarin
- Sichuanese Pinyin: Zong^{1} hua^{2} Min^{2} gue^{2}
Wu
- Wugniu: tson^{1} gho^{2} min^{2} koq^{7}
- IPA: Shanghainese: [tsoŋ˥ ɦo˧ min˨ koʔ˧]
Yue: Cantonese
- Yale Romanization: Jūngwàh Màhngwok
- Jyutping: zung^{1} waa^{4} man^{4} gwok^{3}
- IPA: [tsʊŋ˥ wa˩ mɐn˩ kʷɔk̚˧]
Southern Min
- Hokkien POJ: Tiong-hôa Bîn-kok
- Tâi-lô: Tiong-huâ Bîn-kok
- Teochew Peng'im: dong^{1} hua^{5} ming^{5} gog^{4}
Eastern Min
- Fuzhou BUC: Dṳ̆ng-huà Mìng-guók
Pu-Xian Min
- Hinghwa BUC: De̤ng-huá Míng-go̤h

The Republic of China established its governance over mainland China on 1 January 1912 following the Xinhai Revolution, which overthrew the Manchu-led Qing dynasty and ended China's imperial history. The Beiyang government in Beijing was the internationally recognized government of the ROC from 1912 to 1928, with regional warlords occupying parts of the country after the death of Beiyang leader Yuan Shikai in 1916. In 1926, the Kuomintang (KMT) launched the Northern Expedition, which eventually reunified the country in 1928. The KMT established the Nationalist government and governed the ROC as a one-party state with Nanjing as the capital. In 1949, the KMT was defeated in the Chinese Civil War by the Chinese Communist Party (CCP) and the ROC government retreated to Taiwan, where it remains to this date. The ROC is recorded as a founding member of both the League of Nations and the United Nations. It claimed 11.4 million km^{2} (4.4 million sq mi) of territory, and its population of 541 million in 1949 made it the most populous country in the world.

The Republic of China was officially proclaimed on 1 January 1912 by revolutionaries under Sun Yat-sen, who became provisional president of the new republic. Puyi, the final Qing emperor, abdicated on 12 February 1912. Sun served briefly before handing the presidency to Yuan Shikai, the leader of the Beiyang Army. The Beiyang government quickly became authoritarian and exerted military power over the administration. In 1915, Yuan attempted to replace the Republic with his own imperial dynasty until popular unrest forced him to back down. After he died in 1916, the country fragmented between local commanders of the Beiyang Army, commencing the Warlord Era defined by decentralized conflicts between rival cliques.

Meanwhile, the KMT under Sun attempted multiple times to establish a rival government in Guangzhou, eventually taking the city with help from the Soviet Union under the condition that the KMT form the First United Front with the CCP in order to go about reunifying China. Sun's death in 1925 precipitated a power struggle that eventually resulted in the rise of General Chiang Kai-shek to KMT chairmanship. By 1927, Chiang felt secure enough to end the alliance with the Soviets and purged the Communists before completing the Northern Expedition to achieve Sun's goal in 1928. Chiang subsequently ruled the country as a one-party state under the Dang Guo system, receiving international recognition as the representative of China.

While there was relative prosperity during the Nanjing decade (1927–1937), the ROC faced internal and external threats. The severely weakened CCP gradually rebuilt its strength by organizing peasants in the countryside. Surviving warlords who resented Chiang's consolidation of power led several uprisings, most significantly the Central Plains War. In 1931, Japan invaded Manchuria, followed by a full-scale invasion of China in 1937. World War II devastated the ROC, leading to enormous loss of life and material destruction. Japan surrendered in September 1945 and Taiwan was placed under Chinese administration. Civil war resumed, and the CCP's People's Liberation Army began to gain the upper hand in 1948. The People's Republic of China was proclaimed in October 1949 amid the ROC's exodus to Taiwan.

== Etymology ==
The Republic of China's first provisional president, Sun Yat-sen, chose Zhōnghuá Mínguó (中華民國; 'Chinese People's State') as the country's official Chinese name. The name was derived from the language of the Tongmenghui's 1905 party manifesto, which proclaimed that the four goals of the Chinese revolution were "to expel the Manchu rulers, revive China (Zhōnghuá), establish a people's state (mínguó), and distribute land equally among the people." (Note: Chinese: 驅除韃虜, 恢復中華, 創立民國, 平均地權; pinyin: Qūchú dálǔ, huīfù Zhōnghuá, chuànglì mínguó, píngjūn dì quán) On 15 July 1916, in his welcoming speech to the Cantonese delegates in Shanghai, Sun explained why the term mínguó (民國; 'people's country') was chosen over the gònghéguó (共和國). He associated the label gònghé (共和) with the limiting and authoritarianism-prone Euro-American models of representative republicanism. What he strived for was a more grass-roots model, which he termed zhíjiē mínquán (直接民權; 'direct people's rights'), and which he thought would allow more checks and balances by the people. Later on 20 October 1923, at a national conference for youths in Guangzhou, to explain the core idea behind mínguó (民國; 'people's country'), he pithily compared the phrase "Empire of China" (中華帝國; Zhōnghuá Dìguó; 'Chinese Emperor's Country') to "Republic of China" (中華民國; Zhōnghuá Mínguó; 'Chinese People's Country') in the form of a parallelism: an emperor's country is ruled by only one emperor (帝國是以皇帝一人為主), a people's country is ruled by all four hundred million people (民國是以四萬萬人為主). Both the "Beiyang Government" (from 1912 to 1928), and the "Nationalist Government" (from 1928 to 1949) used the name "Republic of China" as their official name. In Chinese, the official name was often shortened to Zhōngguó (中國; 'Middle Country'), Mínguó (民國; 'People's Country'), or Zhōnghuá (中華; 'Middle Huaxia').

The choice of the term mínguó (民國; 'people's country'; "republic") in 1912, as well as its similar semantic formation to dìguó (帝國; 'emperor's country'; "empire"), may have influenced the choice of the Korean term minguk (민국/民國) by the Provisional Government of the Republic of Korea (founded in 1919 within the Republic of China), which replaced Daehan Jeguk (대한제국/大韓帝國) with Daehan Minguk (대한민국/大韓民國). Today, the Republic of China (中華民國) and Republic of Korea (大韓民國) are unique in the choice of the term 民國 ('people's country') as an equivalent to "republic" in other languages.

In China today, the period from 1912 to 1949 is often called the "Republican Era" (simplified Chinese: 民国时期; traditional Chinese: 民國時期), because from the Chinese government's perspective the ROC ceased to exist in 1949. In Taiwan, these years are called the "Mainland period" (大陸時期; 大陆时期), since it was when the ROC was based on the mainland.

== History ==
A republic was formally established on 1 January 1912 following the Xinhai Revolution, which itself began with the Wuchang uprising on 10 October 1911, successfully overthrowing the Qing dynasty and ending over two thousand years of imperial rule in China. From its founding until 1949, the republic was based on mainland China. Central authority waxed and waned in response to warlordism (1915–1928), a Japanese invasion (1937–1945), and a full-scale civil war (1927–1949), with central authority strongest during the Nanjing Decade (1927–1937), when most of China came under the control of the authoritarian, one-party military dictatorship of the nationalist Kuomintang party (KMT). Neither the Nanjing government nor the earlier Beiyang government succeeded in consolidating governance in rural China.

In 1945, at the end of World War II, the Empire of Japan surrendered control of Taiwan and its island groups to the Allies; and Taiwan was placed under the Republic of China's administrative control. The communist takeover of mainland China in 1949, after the Chinese Civil War, left the ruling Kuomintang with control over only Taiwan, Penghu, Kinmen, Matsu, and other minor islands. With the loss of the mainland, the ROC government retreated to Taiwan and the KMT declared Taipei the provisional capital. Meanwhile, the CCP took over all of mainland China and founded the People's Republic of China (PRC) in Beijing.

=== 1912–1916: Founding ===
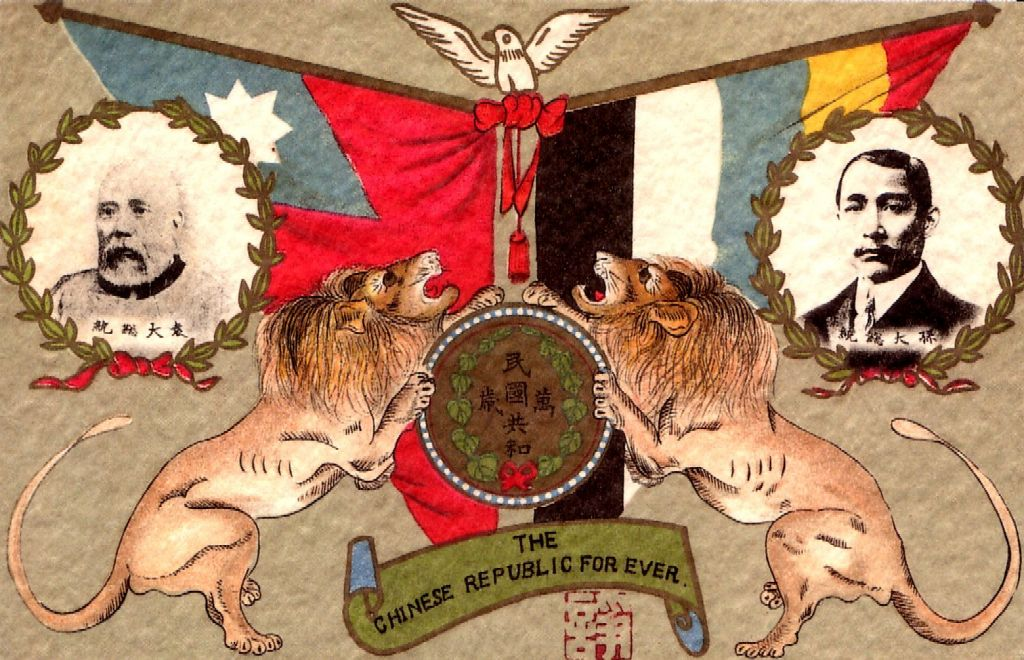
Yuan Shikai (left) and Sun Yat-sen (right) with flags representing the early republic

In 1912, after over two thousand years of dynastic rule, a republic was established to replace the monarchy. The Qing dynasty that preceded the republic had experienced instability throughout the 19th century and suffered from both internal rebellion and foreign imperialism. A program of institutional reform proved too little and too late. Only the lack of an alternative regime prolonged the monarchy's existence until 1912.

The Chinese Republic grew out of the Wuchang Uprising against the Qing government, on 10 October 1911, which is now celebrated annually as the ROC's national day, also known as "Double Ten Day". Sun Yat-sen had been actively promoting revolution from his bases in exile. He then returned from the United States to China and on 29 December, Sun Yat-sen was elected as the provisional president by the revolutionists' assembly in Nanjing, which consisted of representatives from seventeen provinces. On 1 January 1912, he was formally inaugurated and pledged "to overthrow the despotic government led by the Manchu, consolidate the Republic of China and plan for the welfare of the people". Sun's new government lacked military strength. As a compromise, he negotiated with Yuan Shikai the commander of the Beiyang Army, promising Yuan the presidency of the republic if he were to remove the Qing emperor by force. Yuan agreed to the deal. On 12 February 1912, regent Empress Dowager Longyu signed the abdication decree on behalf of Puyi, ending several millennia of monarchical rule.

From December 1912 to February 1913, elections were held nation-wide for each provincial assemblies, which chose their legal delegates for the first National Assembly of the republic. The Kuomintang emerged as the formal political party that replaced the revolutionary organization Tongmenghui, and at these elections it won the largest share of seats in both houses of the National Assembly and in some provincial assemblies. Song Jiaoren led the Kuomintang Party to electoral victories by fashioning his party's program to appeal to the gentry, landowners, and merchants. But Song was assassinated on 20 March 1913, at the behest of Yuan Shikai.

Yuan was elected the first formal president of the ROC in 1913. He ruled by military power and ignored the republican institutions established by his predecessor, threatening to execute Senate members who disagreed with his decisions. After the failed 1913 revolt by the governors of several southern Chinese provinces and supporters of Kuomintang, he dissolved Kuomintang, banned "secret organizations" (which implicitly included the KMT), and ignored the provisional constitution. Ultimately, Yuan declared himself Emperor of China in 1915. The new ruler of China tried to increase centralization by abolishing the provincial system; however, this move angered the gentry along with the provincial governors, who were usually military men.

In August 1914, Japan and British forces blockaded and besieged the German-controlled Chinese port city of Tsingtao amid World War I. The port surrendered to the Japanese in November 1914. Capitalizing on their military successes, in January 1915, taking advantage of the fact that Western powers were distracted by the conflict in Europe, the Empire of Japan sought to drastically expand its political and economic dominance over China by issuing an ultimatum to China, known as the Twenty-One Demands. Japan divided these demands into five groups, seeking immediate control over German concessions in Shandong, extended leases in Manchuria, joint ownership of major Chinese mining complexes, and a ban on ceding coastal territory to other foreign powers. The most aggressive section, Group 5, demanded that China hire Japanese military and financial advisors and purchase Japanese weapons, which would have effectively turned China into a Japanese protectorate. Lacking Western military support, Chinese President Yuan Shikai capitulated to a revised version of the treaty in May 1915, agreeing to the first four groups while successfully postponing the fifth. This forced concession sparked immense domestic outrage, and ignited a wave of fierce Chinese nationalism.

=== 1916–1927: Warlord Era ===
Yuan's changes to government caused many provinces to declare independence and become warlord states. Increasingly unpopular and deserted by his supporters, Yuan abdicated in 1916 and died of natural causes shortly thereafter. China then declined into a period of warlordism. Sun, having been forced into exile, returned to Guangdong in the south in 1917 and 1922, with the help of warlords, and set up successive rival governments to the Beiyang government in Beijing, having re-established the KMT in October 1919. Sun's dream was to unify China by launching an expedition against the north. However, he lacked the military support and funding to turn it into a reality.

Meanwhile, the Beiyang government struggled to hold onto power, and an open and wide-ranging debate evolved regarding how China should confront the West. In 1919, a student protest against the government's weak response to the Treaty of Versailles and the aftermath of the Chinese concessions made in the Twenty-One Demands, considered unfair by Chinese intellectuals, led to the May Fourth movement, whose demonstrations were calling for widespread embrace of Western ideas—such as science and democracy—to revitalize a China that intellectuals felt was being held back by traditional Confucian culture. It was in this intellectual climate that Marxist thought began to spread. The Chinese Communist Party (CCP) was founded in 1921 with the help of the Soviet Union and the Communist International and a nominal KMT–CCP Alliance was soon formed to reunite China. CCP members joined the KMT and the two parties cooperated to build a revolutionary base in Guangzhou, though rifts became apparent quickly.

After Sun's death in March 1925, Chiang Kai-shek became the leader of the Kuomintang. In 1926, Chiang led the Northern Expedition with the intention of defeating the Beiyang warlords and unifying the country. Chiang received the help of the Soviet Union and the CCP. However, he soon dismissed his Soviet advisers, being convinced that they wanted to get rid of the KMT and take control. Chiang decided to purge the Communists, massacring thousands in Shanghai. At the same time, other violent conflicts were taking place in China: in the South, where the CCP had superior numbers, Nationalist supporters were being massacred.

=== 1927–1937: Nanjing decade ===
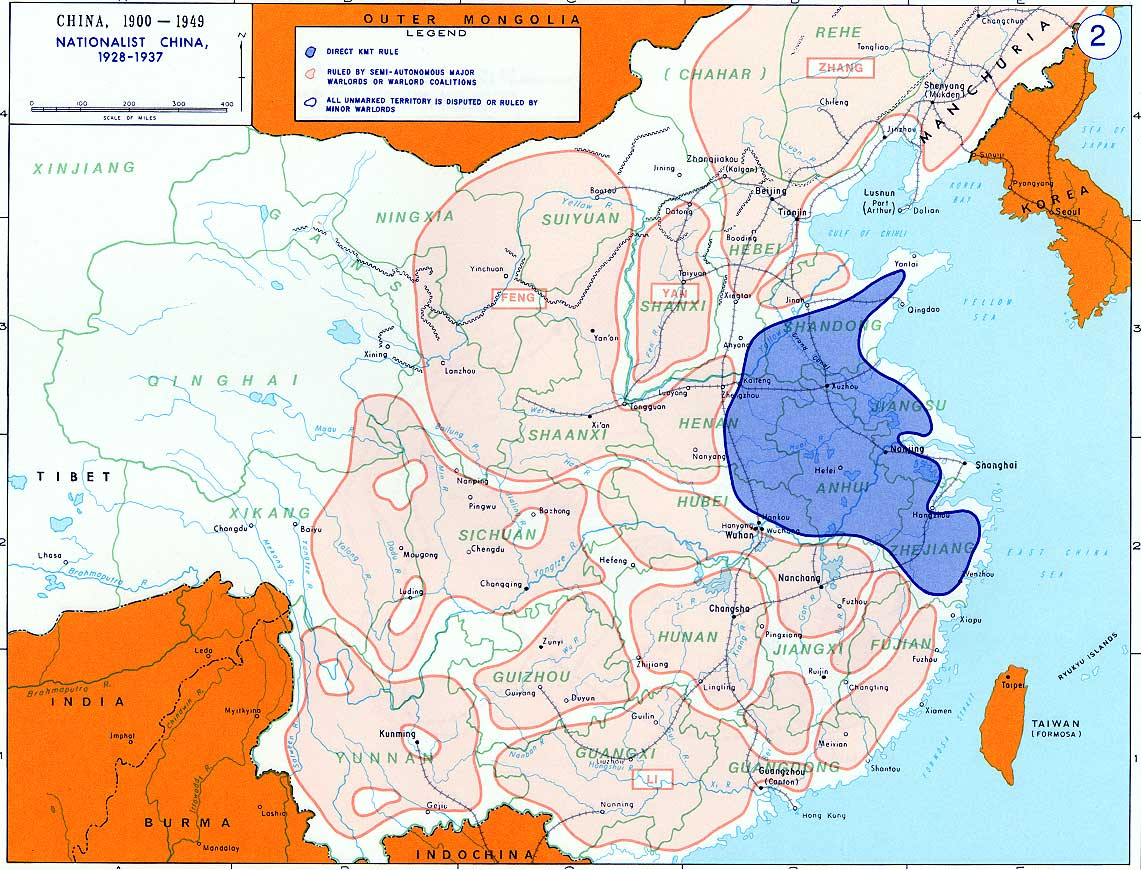
Major Chinese warlord coalitions during the "Nanjing Decade"

Chiang Kai-shek pushed the CCP into interior China and established a central government, with Nanjing as its capital, in 1927. By 1928, Chiang's army overthrew the Beiyang government and unified the entire nation, at least nominally, beginning the Nanjing decade.

Sun Yat-sen envisioned three phases for the KMT rebuilding of China – military rule and violent reunification; political tutelage; and finally a constitutional democracy. In 1930, after seizing power and reunifying China by force, the "tutelage" phase started with the promulgation of a provisional constitution. In an attempt to distance themselves from the Soviets, the Chinese government sought assistance from Germany.

According to Lloyd Eastman, Chiang Kai-shek was influenced by European fascist movements, and he launched the Blue Shirts Society and the New Life Movement in imitation of them, in an effort to counter the growth of Mao's communism as well as resist both Western and Japanese imperialism. According to Stanley Payne, however, Chiang's KMT was "normally classified as a multi-class populist or 'nation-building' party but not a fitting candidate for fascism (except by old-line Communists)." He also stated that, "Lloyd Eastman has called the Blue Shirts, whose members admired European fascism and were influenced by it, a Chinese fascist organization. This is probably an exaggeration. The Blue Shirts certainly exhibited some of the characteristics of fascism, as did many nationalist organizations around the world, but it is not clear that the group possessed the full qualities of an intrinsic fascist movement....The Blue Shirts probably had some affinity with and for fascism, a common feature of nationalisms in crisis during the 1930s, but it is doubtful that they represented any clear-cut Asian variant of fascism."

Still other historians have noted that Chiang and the KMT's exact ideology itself was very complex and oscillated over time, with different factions (left-wing and right-wing) of his government cooperating with both the Soviets and Germans as they saw fit, and that Chiang eventually became disillusioned with the Blue Shirts, which officially disbanded by 1938, something Payne also mentions as "possibly because of competition with the KMT itself." Some have also noted that in contrast to older historians from decades ago, Chiang's efforts have been increasingly seen by newer Western and Chinese historians alike as an arguably necessary if austere part of the complicated nation-building process in China during his time, especially given the wide range of both domestic and foreign challenges it faced on many different concurrent fronts.

Several major government institutions were founded during this period, including the Academia Sinica and the Central Bank of China. In 1932, China sent its first team to the Olympic Games. Campaigns were mounted and laws passed to promote the rights of women. In the 1931 Civil Code, women were given equal inheritance rights, banned forced marriage and gave women the right to control their own money and initiate divorce. No nationally unified women's movement could organize until China was unified under the Kuomintang Government in Nanjing in 1928; women's suffrage was finally included in the new Constitution of 1936, although the constitution was not implemented until 1947. Addressing social problems, especially in remote villages, was aided by improved communications. The Rural Reconstruction Movement was one of many that took advantage of the new freedom to raise social consciousness. The Nationalist government published a draft constitution on 5 May 1936.

Continual wars plagued the government. Those in the western border regions included the Kumul Rebellion, the Sino-Tibetan War, and the Soviet Invasion of Xinjiang. Large areas of China proper remained under the semi-autonomous rule of local warlords such as Feng Yuxiang and Yan Xishan, provincial military leaders, or warlord coalitions. Nationalist rule was strongest in the eastern regions around the capital Nanjing. The Central Plains War in 1930, the Japanese invasion of Manchuria in 1931, and the Communist Red Army's Long March in 1934 led to a centralization of power within the Nationalist central government, but there continued to be foot-dragging and even outright defiance, as in the Fujian Rebellion of 1933–1934.

Reformers and critics pushed for democracy and human rights, but the task seemed difficult if not impossible. The nation was at war and divided between Communists and Nationalists. Corruption and lack of direction hindered reforms. Chiang told the State Council: "Our organization becomes worse and worse... many staff members just sit at their desks and gaze into space, others read newspapers and still others sleep."

=== 1937–1945: Second Sino-Japanese War ===
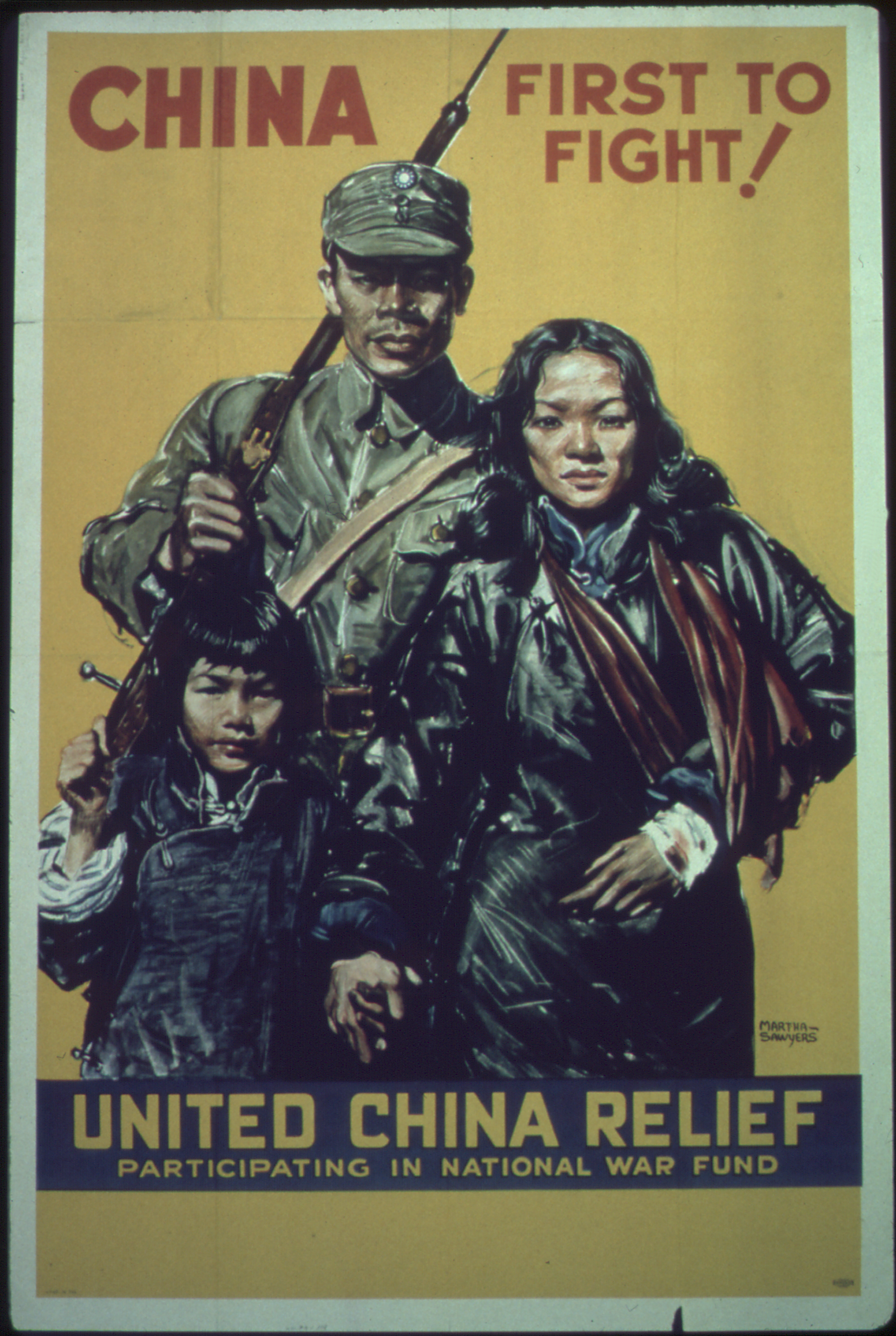
China had been at war with Japan since 1931

Few Chinese had any illusions about Japanese desires on China. Hungry for raw materials and pressed by a growing population, Japan initiated the seizure of Manchuria in September 1931, and established the former emperor Puyi as head of the puppet state of Manchukuo in 1932. The loss of Manchuria, and its potential for industrial development and war industries, was a blow to the Kuomintang economy. The League of Nations, established at the end of World War I, was unable to act in the face of Japanese defiance.

The Japanese began to push south of the Great Wall into northern China and the coastal provinces. Chinese fury against Japan was predictable, but anger was also directed against Chiang and the Nanjing government, which at the time was more preoccupied with anti-Communist extermination campaigns than with resisting the Japanese invaders. The importance of "internal unity before external danger" was forcefully brought home in December 1936, when Chiang Kai-shek was kidnapped by Zhang Xueliang and forced to ally with the Communists against the Japanese in the Second United Front, an event now known as the Xi'an Incident.

Chinese resistance stiffened after 7 July 1937, when a clash occurred between Chinese and Japanese troops outside Beijing near the Marco Polo Bridge. This skirmish led to full-scale open, although undeclared, warfare between China and Japan. Shanghai fell after a three-month battle during which Japan suffered extensive casualties in both its army and navy. The capital, Nanking fell in December 1937, which was followed by mass murders and rapes known as the Nanjing Massacre. The national capital was briefly at Wuhan, then removed in an epic retreat to Chongqing, the seat of government in Southern China until 1945. In 1940, the Japanese set up the collaborationist Wang Jingwei regime, with its capital in Nanjing, which proclaimed itself the legitimate "Republic of China" in opposition to Chiang Kai-shek's government, although its claims were significantly hampered due to its being a puppet state controlling limited amounts of territory.

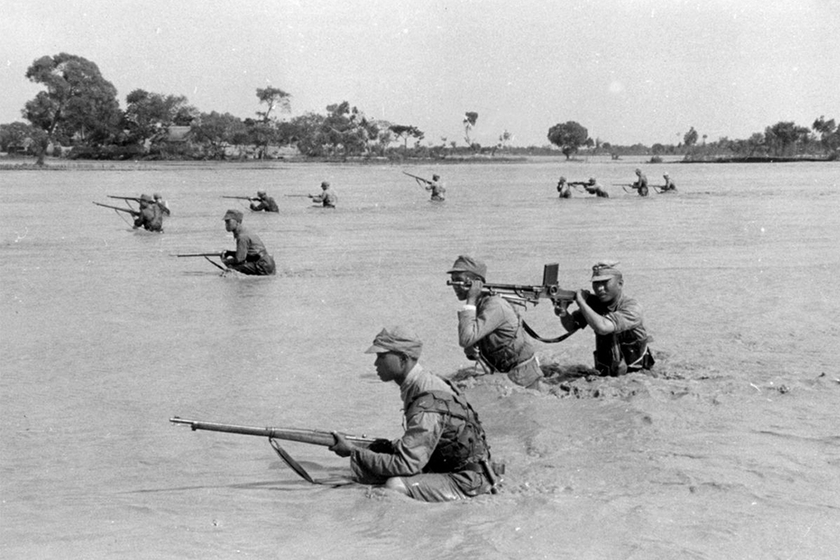
Chinese Nationalist Army soldiers during the 1938 Yellow River flood

The United Front between the Kuomintang and the CCP had salutary effects for the beleaguered CCP, despite Japan's steady territorial gains in northern China, the coastal regions and the rich Yangtze River valley in central China. After 1940, conflicts between the Kuomintang and Communists became more frequent in the areas not under Japanese control. The Communists expanded their influence wherever opportunities presented themselves through mass organizations, administrative reforms and the land- and tax-reform measures favoring the peasants and, the spread of their organizational network, while the Kuomintang attempted to neutralize the spread of Communist influence. Meanwhile, northern China was infiltrated politically by Japanese politicians in Manchukuo using facilities such as the Manchukuo Imperial Palace.

After its entry into the Pacific War during World War II, the United States became increasingly involved in Chinese affairs. As an ally, it embarked in late 1941 on a program of massive military and financial aid to the hard-pressed Nationalist Government. In January 1943, both the United States and the United Kingdom led the way in revising their unequal treaties with China from the past. Within a few months a new agreement was signed between the United States and the Republic of China for the stationing of American troops in China as part of the common war effort against Japan. The United States sought unsuccessfully to reconcile the rival Kuomintang and Communists, to make for a more effective anti-Japanese war effort. In December 1943, the Chinese Exclusion Acts of the 1880s, and subsequent laws, enacted by the United States Congress to restrict Chinese immigration into the United States were repealed. The wartime policy of the United States was meant to help China become a strong ally and a stabilizing force in postwar East Asia. During the war, China was one of the Big Four Allies, and later one of the Four Policemen, which was a precursor to China having a permanent seat on the United Nations Security Council.

In August 1945, with American help, Nationalist troops moved to take the Japanese surrender in North China. The Soviet Union—encouraged to invade Manchuria to hasten the end of the war and allowed a Soviet sphere of influence there as agreed to at the Yalta Conference in February 1945—dismantled and removed more than half the industrial equipment left there by the Japanese. Although the Chinese had not been present at Yalta, they had been consulted and had agreed to have the Soviets enter the war, in the belief that the Soviet Union would deal only with the Kuomintang government. However, the Soviet presence in northeast China enabled the Communists to arm themselves with equipment surrendered by the withdrawing Japanese army.

=== 1945–1949: Defeat in the Chinese Civil War ===
In 1945, after the end of the war, the Nationalist Government moved back to Nanjing. The Republic of China emerged from the war nominally a great military power but actually a nation economically prostrate and on the verge of all-out civil war. The problems of rehabilitating the formerly Japanese-occupied areas and of reconstructing the nation from the ravages of a protracted war were staggering. The economy deteriorated, sapped by the military demands of foreign war and internal strife, by spiraling inflation, and by Nationalist profiteering, speculation, and hoarding. Starvation came in the wake of the war, and millions were rendered homeless by floods and unsettled conditions in many parts of the country.

On 25 October 1945, following the surrender of Japan, the administration of Taiwan and Penghu Islands were handed over from Japan to China. After the end of the war, United States Marines were used to hold Beijing and Tianjin against a possible Soviet incursion, and logistic support was given to Kuomintang forces in north and northeast China. To further this end, on 30 September 1945 the 1st Marine Division, charged with maintaining security in the areas of the Shandong Peninsula and the eastern Hebei, arrived in China.

In January 1946, through the mediation of the United States, a military truce between the Kuomintang and the Communists was arranged, but battles soon resumed. Public opinion of the administrative incompetence of the Nationalist government was incited by the Communists during the nationwide student protest against the mishandling of the Shen Chong rape case in early 1947 and during another national protest against monetary reforms later that year. The United States—realizing that no American efforts short of large-scale armed intervention could stop the coming war—withdrew Gen. George Marshall's American mission. Thereafter, the Chinese Civil War became more widespread; battles raged not only for territories but also for the allegiance of sections of the population. The United States aided the Nationalists with massive economic loans and weapons but no combat support.

The Nationalists' retreat to Taipei: after the Nationalists lost Nanjing they next moved to Guangzhou, then to Chongqing, Chengdu, and Xichang before arriving in Taipei.

Belatedly, the Republic of China government sought to enlist popular support through internal reforms. However, the effort was in vain, because of rampant government corruption and the accompanying political and economic chaos. By late 1948 the Kuomintang position was bleak. The demoralized and undisciplined National Revolutionary Army proved to be no match for the Communists' motivated and disciplined People's Liberation Army. The Communists were well established in the north and northeast. Although the Kuomintang had an advantage in numbers of men and weapons, controlled a much larger territory and population than their adversaries, and enjoyed considerable international support, they were exhausted by the long war with Japan and in-fighting among various generals. They were also losing the propaganda war to the Communists, with a population weary of Kuomintang corruption and yearning for peace.

In January 1949, Beiping was taken by the Communists without a fight, and its name changed back to Beijing. Following the capture of Nanjing on 23 April, major cities passed from Kuomintang to Communist control with minimal resistance, through November. In most cases the surrounding countryside and small towns had come under Communist influence long before the cities. Finally, on 1 October 1949, Communists led by Mao Zedong founded the People's Republic of China. Chiang Kai-shek declared martial law in May 1949, whilst a few hundred thousand Nationalist troops and two million refugees, predominantly from the government and business community, fled from mainland China to Taiwan. There remained in China itself only isolated pockets of resistance. On 7 December 1949, Chiang proclaimed Taipei the temporary capital of the Republic of China.

During the Chinese Civil War both the Nationalists and Communists carried out mass atrocities, with millions of non-combatants killed by both sides. Benjamin Valentino has estimated atrocities in the civil war resulted in the death of between 1.8 million and 3.5 million people between 1927 and 1949, including deaths from forced conscription and massacres.

=== Maps ===
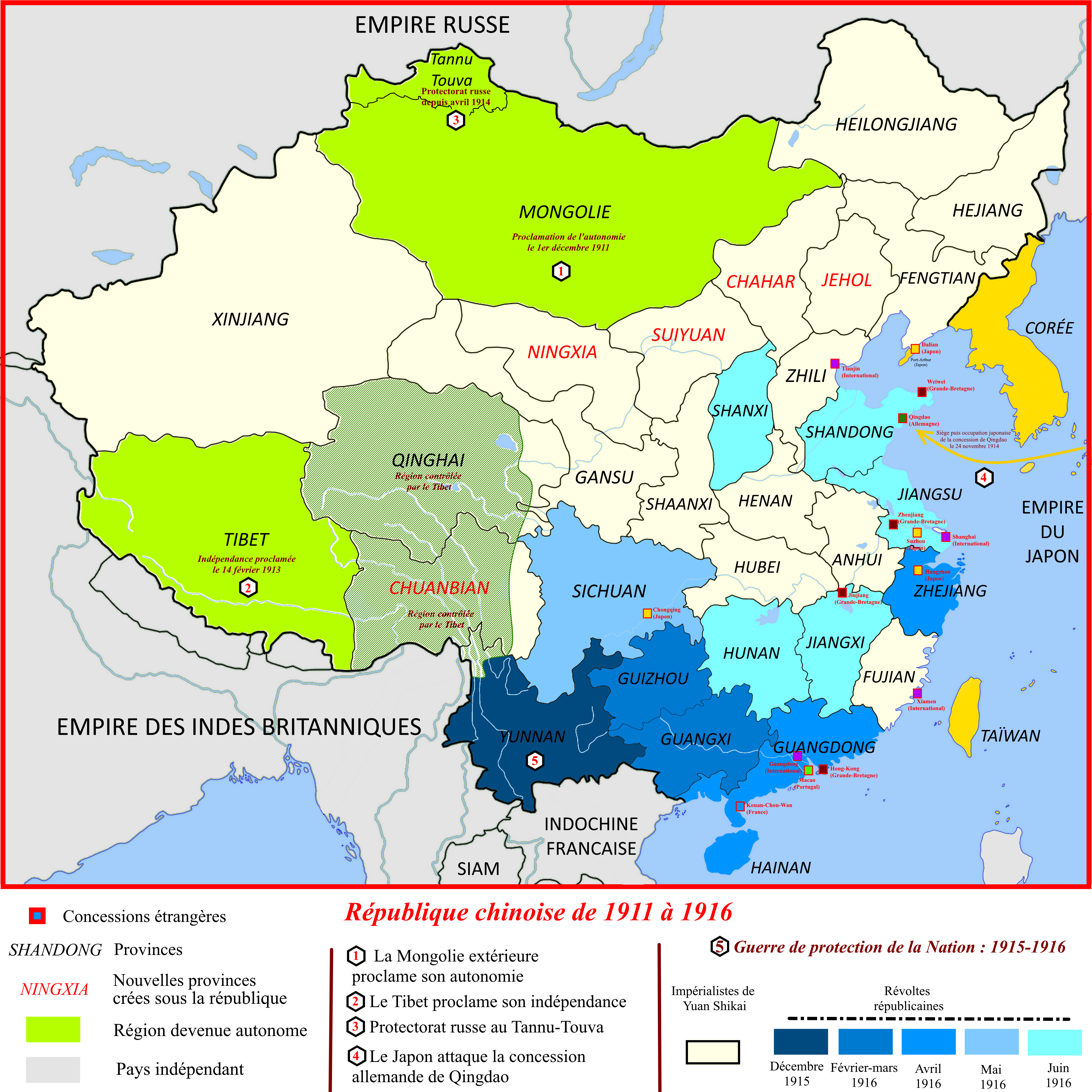
From 1911 to 1916

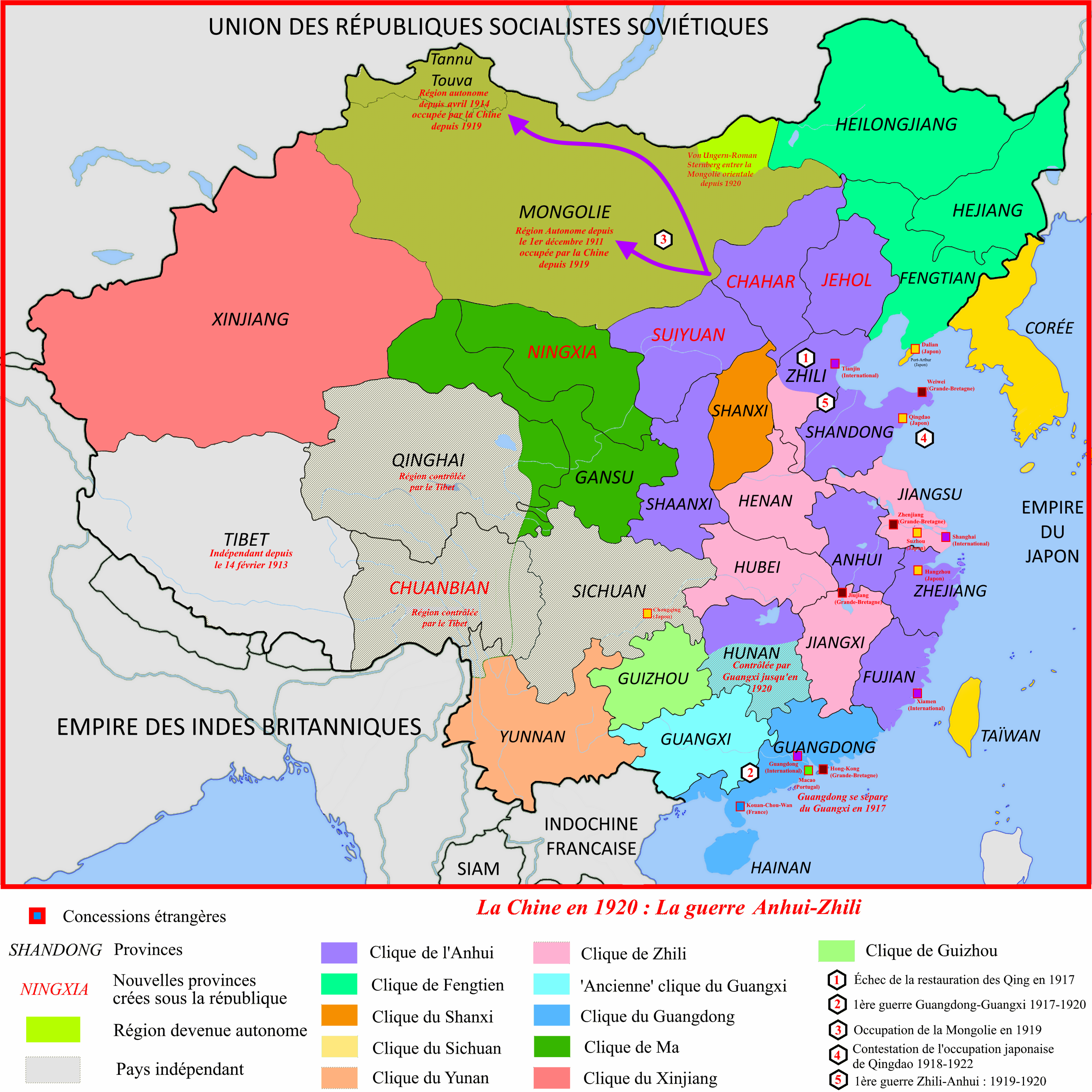
From 1916 to 1920

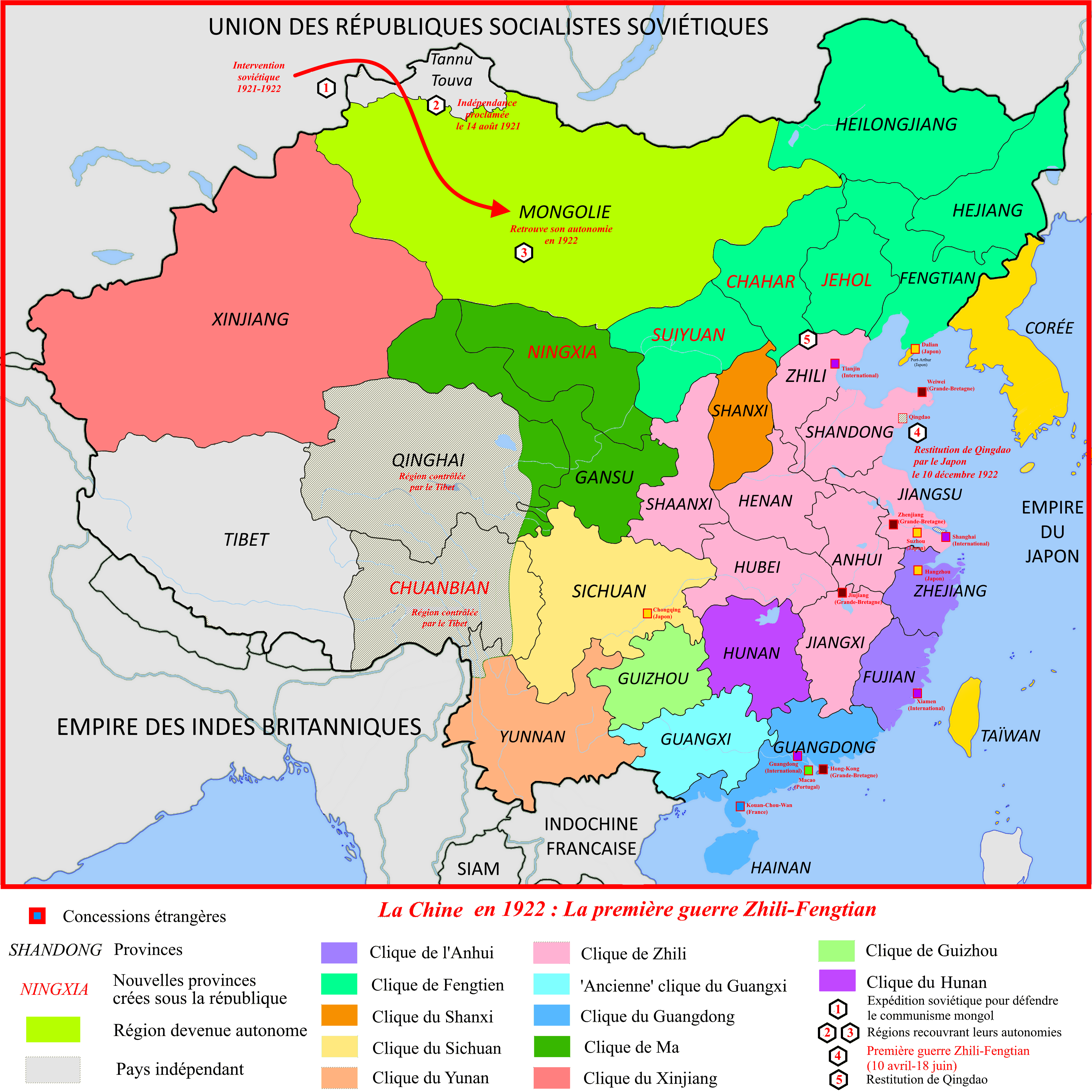
From 1921 to 1922

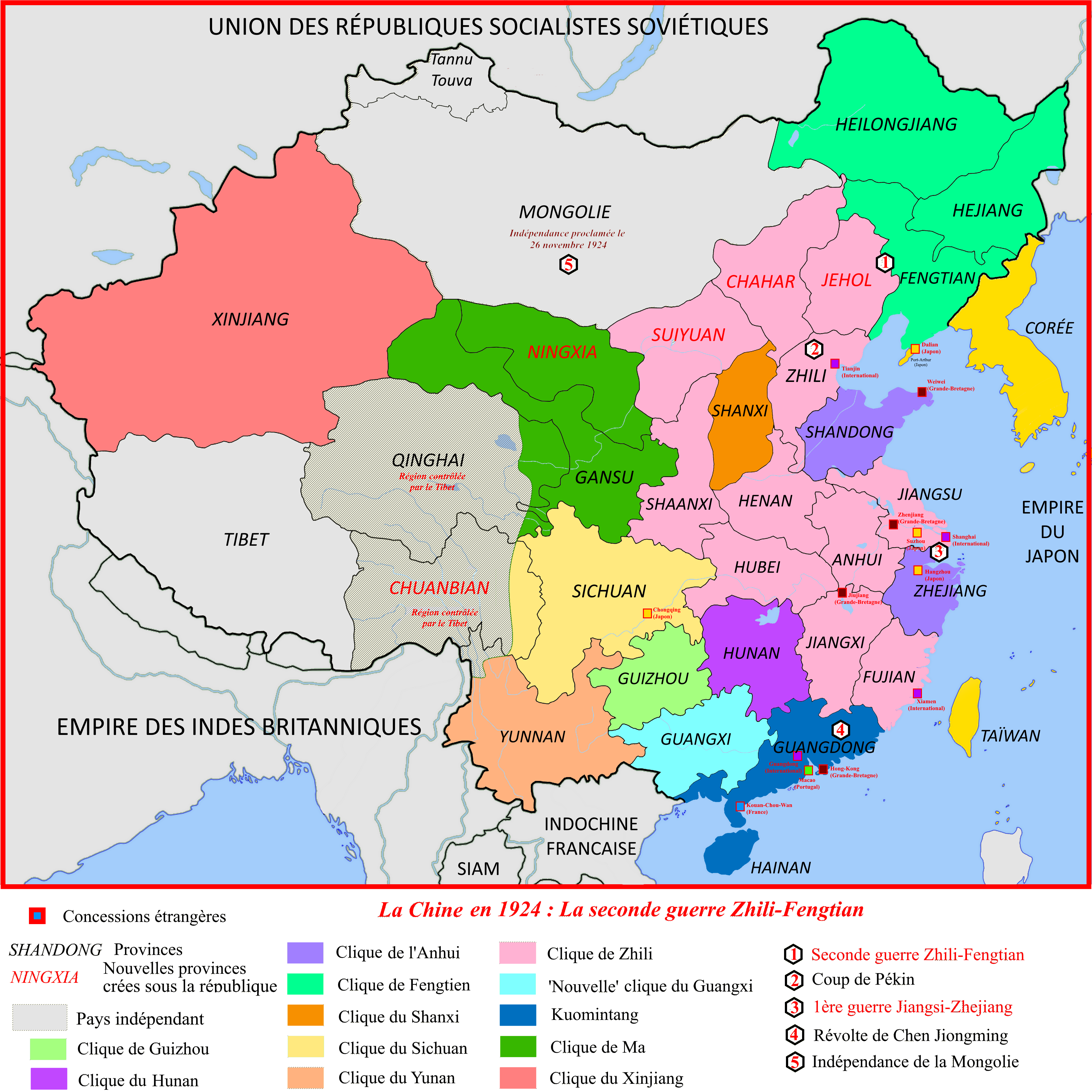
From 1923 to 1924

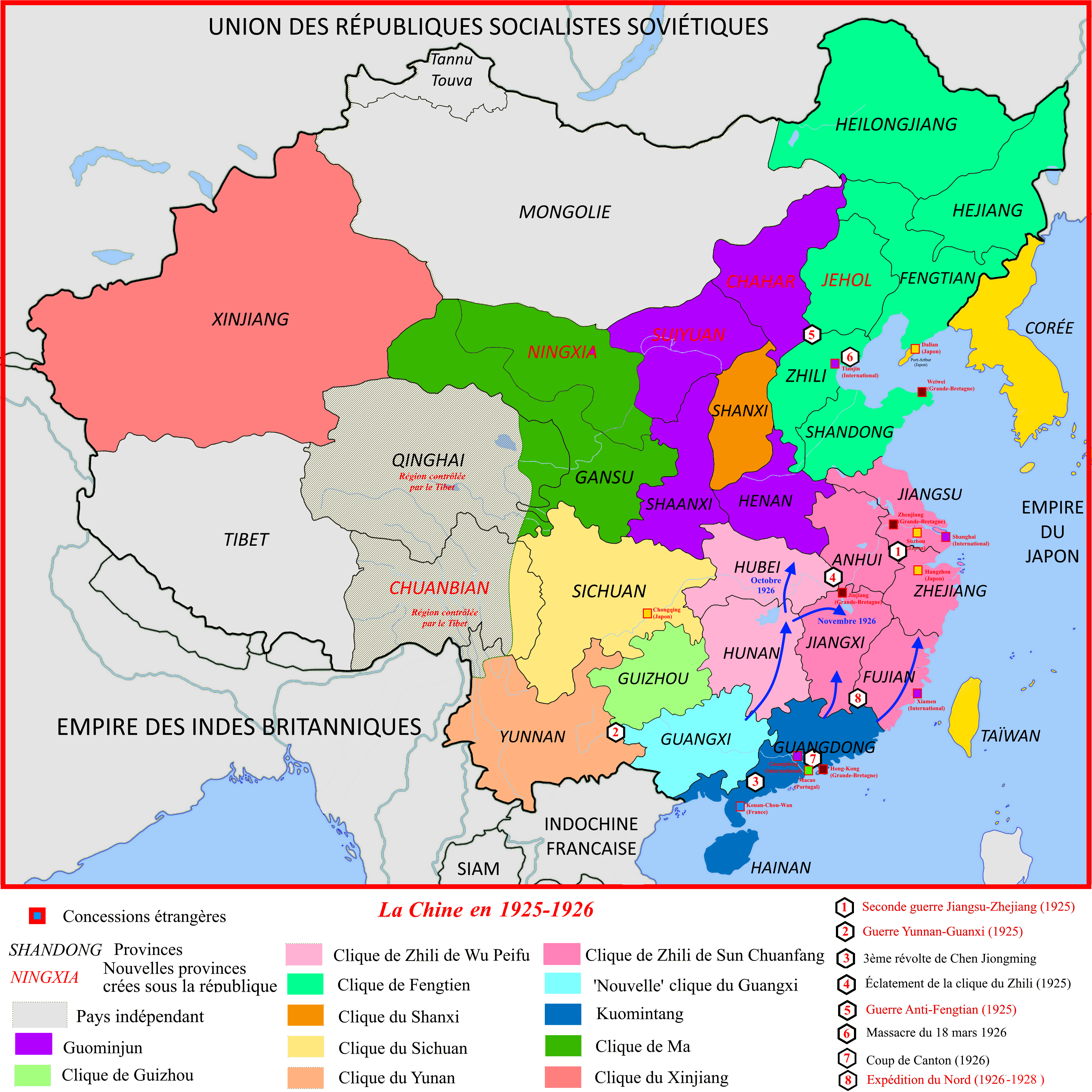
From 1925 to 1926

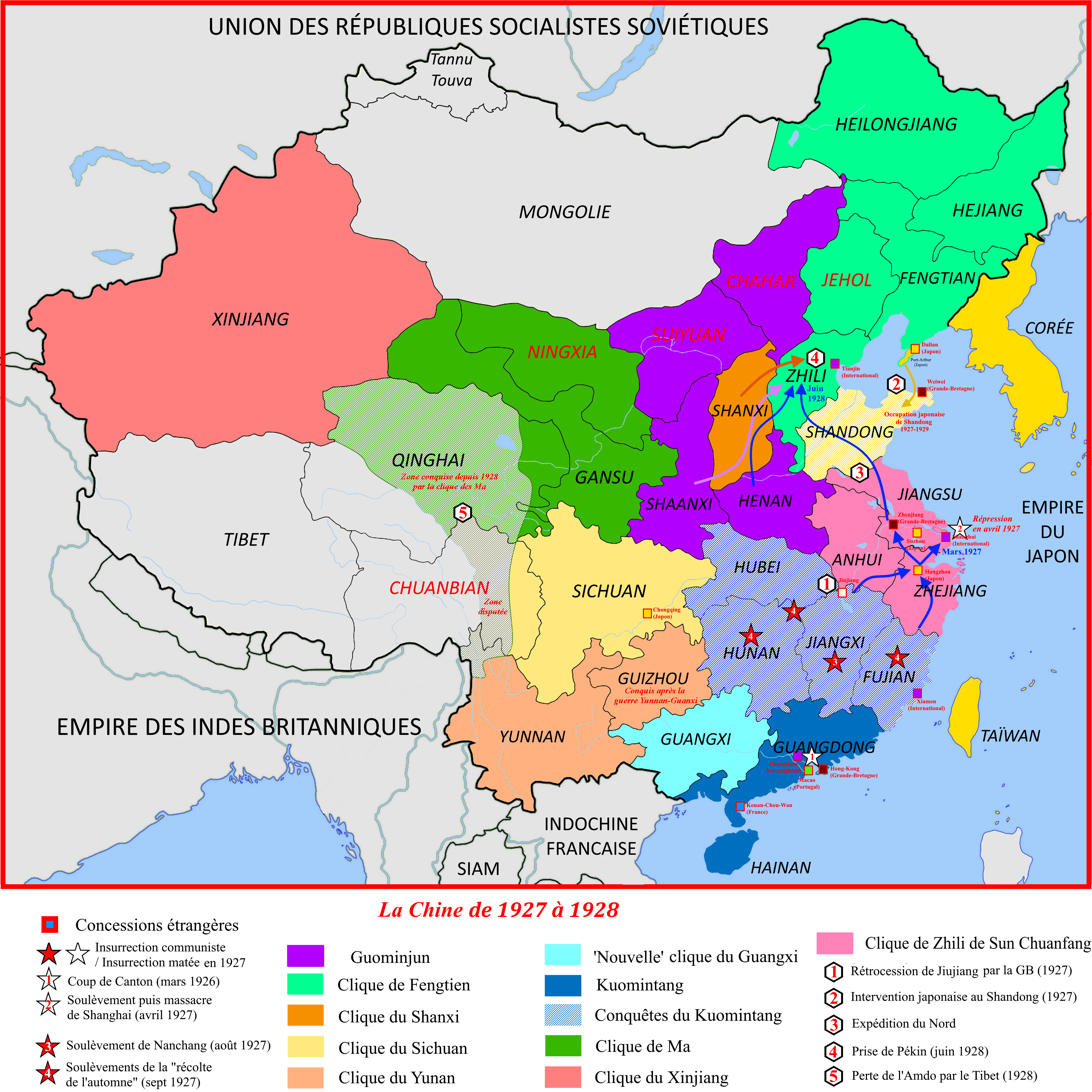
From 1927 to 1928

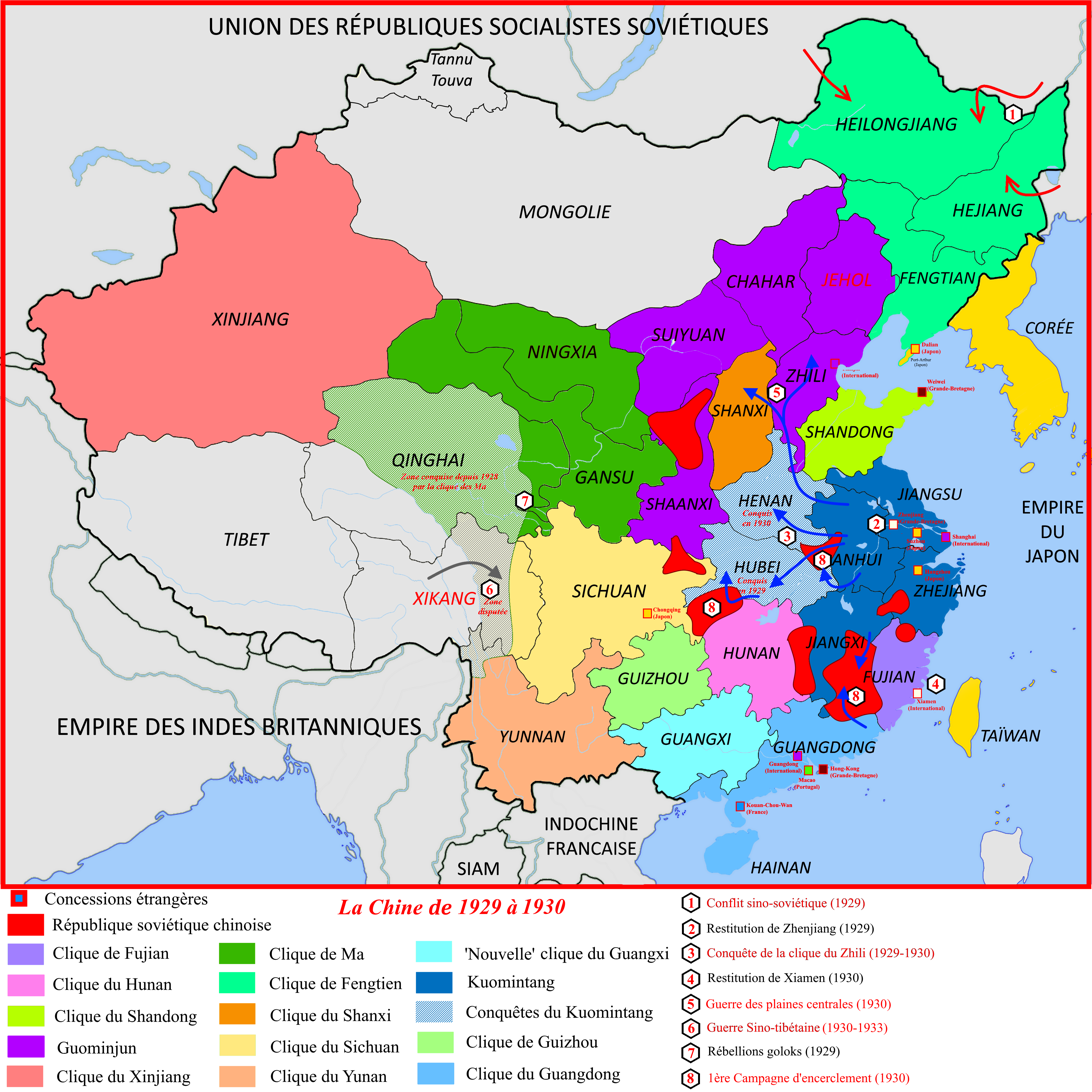
From 1929 to 1930

== Politics ==
The first Republic of China national government was established on 1 January 1912, in Nanjing, with a constitution stating Three Principles of the People, which state that "[the ROC] shall be a democratic republic of the people, to be governed by the people and for the people."

Sun Yat-sen was the provisional president. Delegates from the provinces sent to confirm the government's authority formed the first parliament in 1913. The power of this government was limited, with generals controlling both the central and northern provinces of China, and short-lived. The number of acts passed by the government was few and included the formal abdication of the Qing dynasty and some economic initiatives. The parliament's authority soon became nominal: violations of the Constitution by Yuan were met with half-hearted motions of censure. Kuomintang members of parliament who gave up their membership in the KMT were offered 1,000 pounds. Yuan maintained power locally by sending generals to be provincial governors or by obtaining the allegiance of those already in power.

When Yuan died, the parliament of 1913 was reconvened to give legitimacy to a new government. However, the real power passed to military leaders, leading to the warlord period. The impotent government still had its use; when World War I began, several Western powers and Japan wanted China to declare war on Germany, to liquidate German holdings in China.

In February 1928, the Fourth Plenary Session of the 2nd Kuomintang National Congress, held in Nanjing, passed the Reorganization of the Nationalist Government Act. This act stipulated that the Nationalist Government was to be directed and regulated under the Central Executive Committee of the Kuomintang, with the Committee of the Nationalist Government being elected by the KMT Central Committee. Under the Nationalist Government were seven ministries—Interior, Foreign Affairs, Finance, Transport, Justice, Agriculture and Mines, and Commerce, in addition to institutions such as the Supreme Court, Control Yuan, and the General Academy.

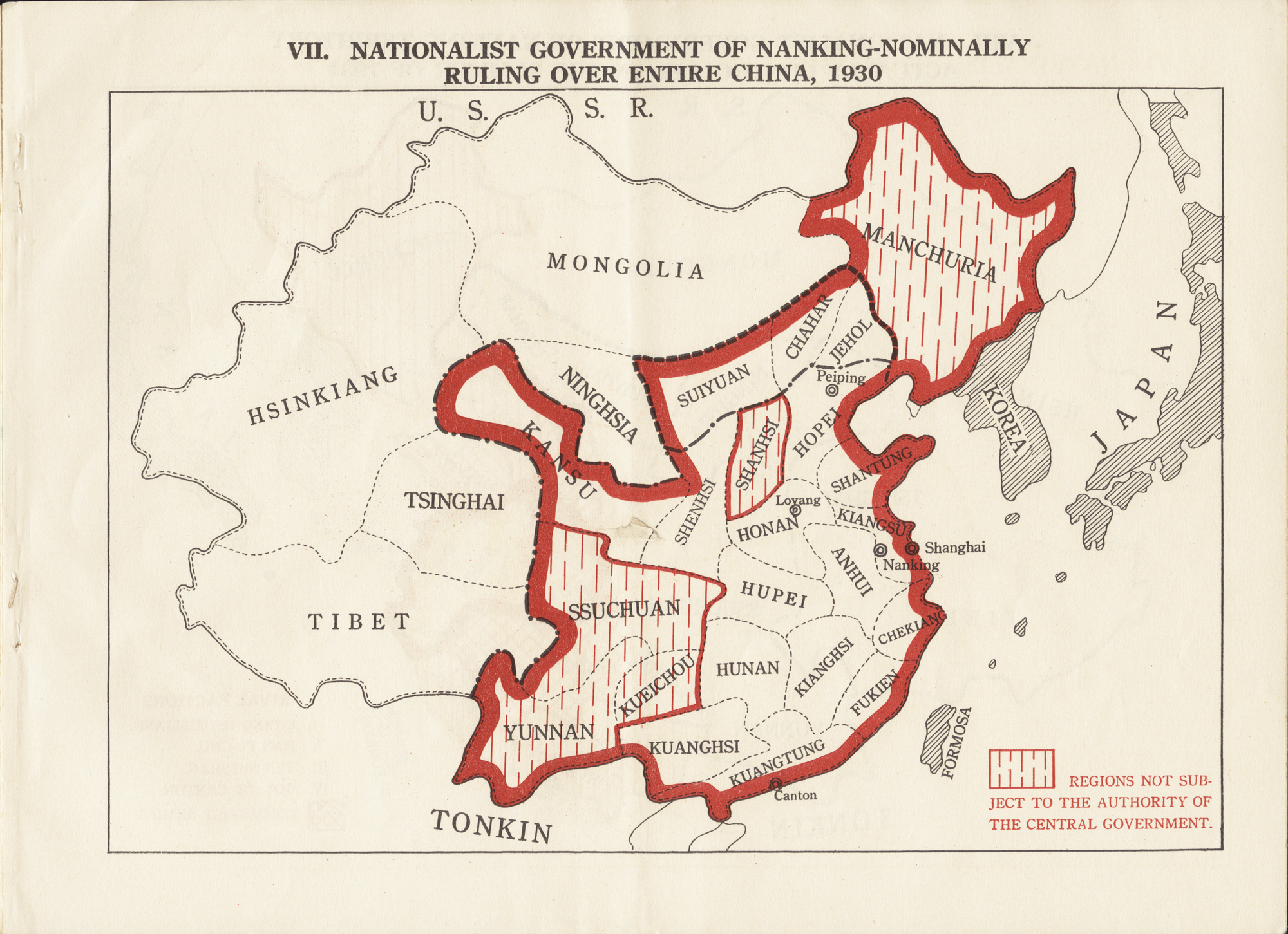
Nationalist government of Nanjing, which nominally ruled over all of China during 1930s

With the promulgation of the Organic Law of the Nationalist Government in October 1928, the government was reorganized into five different branches, or yuan, namely the Executive Yuan, Legislative Yuan, Judicial Yuan, Examination Yuan, as well as the Control Yuan. The Chairman of the National Government was to be the head-of-state and commander-in-chief of the National Revolutionary Army. Chiang Kai-shek was appointed as the first chairman, a position he would retain until 1931. The Organic Law also stipulated that the Kuomintang, through its National Congress and Central Executive Committee, would exercise sovereign power during the period of "political tutelage", that the KMT's Political Council would guide and superintend the Nationalist Government in the execution of important national affairs, and that the Political Council has the power to interpret or amend the Organic Law.

Shortly after the Second Sino-Japanese War, a long-delayed constitutional convention was summoned to meet in Nanjing in May 1946. Amidst heated debate, this convention adopted many constitutional amendments demanded by several parties, including the KMT and the Communist Party, into the Constitution. This Constitution was promulgated on 25 December 1946 and came into effect on 25 December 1947. Under it, the Central Government was divided into the presidency and the five yuans, each responsible for a part of the government. None was responsible to the other except for certain obligations such as the president appointing the head of the Executive Yuan. Ultimately, the president and the yuans reported to the National Assembly, which represented the will of the citizens.

Under the new constitution the first elections for the National Assembly occurred in January 1948, and the assembly was summoned to meet in March 1948. It elected the president of the republic on 21 March 1948, formally bringing an end to the KMT party rule started in 1928, although the president was a member of the KMT. These elections, though praised by at least one US observer, were poorly received by the Communist Party, which would soon start an open, armed insurrection.

=== Foreign relations ===
Before the Nationalist government was ousted from the mainland, the Republic of China had diplomatic relations with 59 countries, including Australia, Canada, Cuba, Czechoslovakia, Estonia, France, Germany, Guatemala, Honduras, Italy, Japan, Latvia, Lithuania, Norway, Panama, Siam, the Soviet Union, Spain, the United Kingdom, the United States, and the Holy See. The Republic of China was able to maintain most of these diplomatic ties, at least initially following the retreat to Taiwan. Chiang Kai-shek had vowed to quickly return and "liberate" the mainland, an assurance that became a cornerstone of the ROC's post 1949 foreign policy.

The foreign concessions that existed prior to the Republic continued to exist. By the early 1930s China regained sovereignty over around 2/3rds of them.

==== Sports ====
The ROC did try to participate in a variety of entities for the international community including the League of Nations along with its successor the United Nations and the Olympic Games. It was hoped by the government that participating in the Olympic Games this could give more legitimacy to the country in the eyes of the international community and "sports could also cultivate modern citizens and a strong nation". The Republic of China sent athletes to the 1924 Summer Olympics in Paris, 1932 Summer Olympics in Los Angeles, 1936 Summer Olympics in Berlin and the 1948 Summer Olympics but no athletes won any medals. For 1928 a single athlete was sent. Although athletes were sent to the 1924 games they did not participate in the games.

==== League of Nations ====
The Republic of China was a founding member of the League of Nations and participated until it was dissolved. Those in the country's foreign relations were among the most stable of those working in the government in terms of composition. The ROC was a non-permanent member of the Council of the League of Nations for 11 out of 20 years (approx. 1921–1923, 1927–1928, 1932–1934, 1937–1939). Although the ROC lobbied to be a permanent member of the League Council it never became one. At the League of Nations, China wanted to see the unequal treaties revised. The ROC thought that by being in the League they could improve their international standing.

==== United Nations ====
Under the Charter of the United Nations, the Republic of China was entitled to a permanent seat on the UN Security Council (UNSC). Though multiple objections were raised that the seat belonged to the lawful government of China, which had to many become the PRC even arguably prior to the official conclusion of the Chinese Civil War, (Note: The relocation to Taiwan was initially intended to be a regrouping as the KMT had not actually been wholly defeated in the rest of China in 1949 and was initially able to hold onto pockets of Chinese territory on the mainland. After losing Hainan in 1950, most KMT holdouts were soon overrun, attempts to hold parts of the Chinese coast, especially that closest to Taiwan failed and rather than returning and reconquering – by the late 1950s the only presence the ROC had in mainland China was in the remote areas of western China's wilderness were a small number of KMT loyalists held out fighting a guerilla campaign that was gradually worn down.) the ROC retained the permanent seat reserved for China on the UNSC until 1971 when it was supplanted by the PRC.

=== Administrative divisions ===
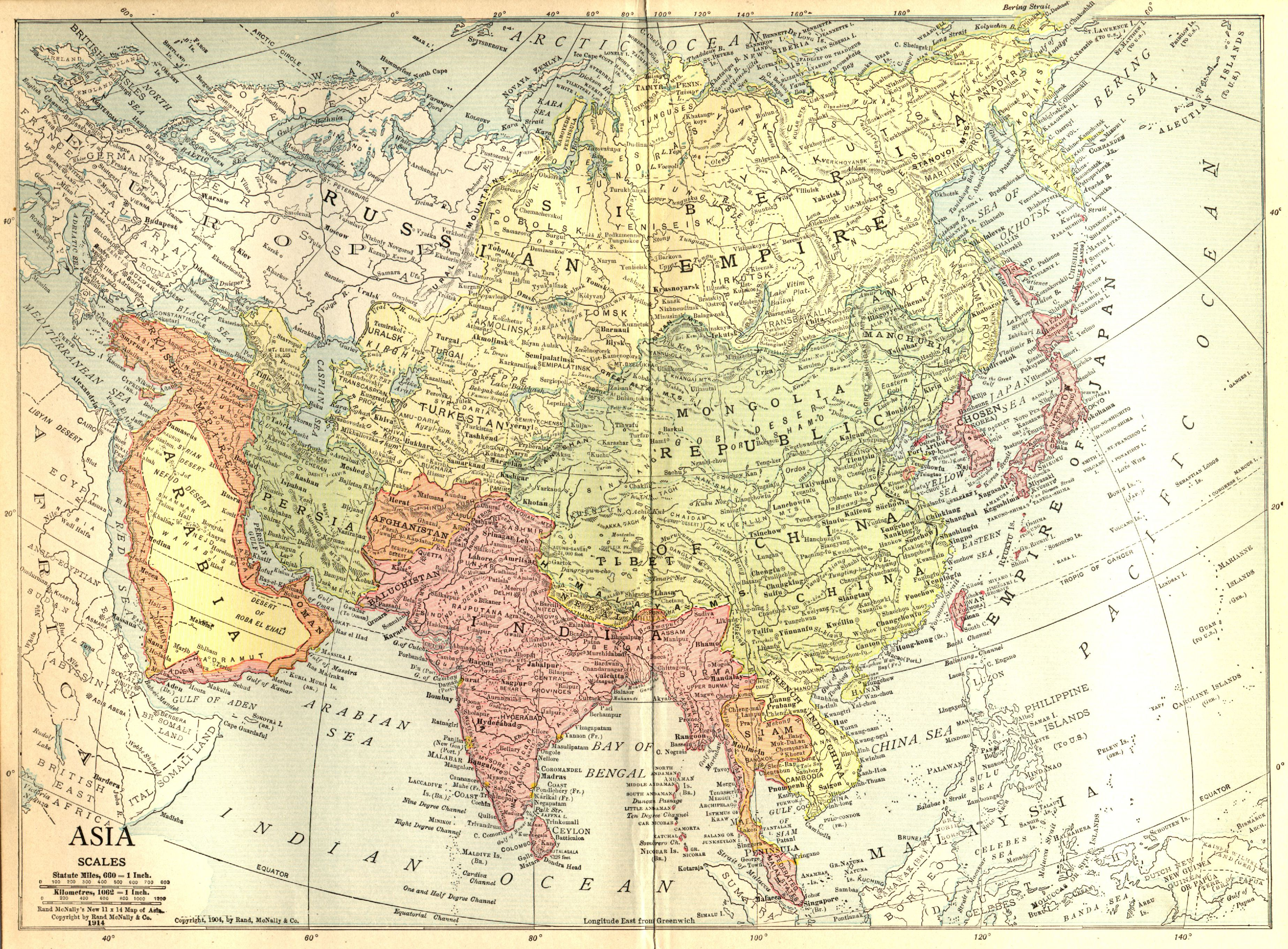
Rand McNally map of the Republic of China in 1914, after Mongolia declared its independence

Map of the first-level administrative divisions of the Republic of China in law (1945)

Provinces and Equivalents of the Republic of China (1945)
Name	Traditional Chinese	Pinyin	Abbreviation	Capital	Chinese	Modern equivalent (if applicable)
Provinces
Andong	安東	Āndōng	安 ān	Tonghua	通化	(Note: Now part of Jilin and Liaoning)
Anhui	安徽	Ānhuī	皖 wǎn	Hefei	合肥	
Chahar	察哈爾	Cháhār	察 chá	Zhangyuan (Zhangjiakou)	張垣(張家口)	(Note: Now part of Inner Mongolia and Hebei)
Zhejiang	浙江	Zhèjiāng	浙 zhè	Hangzhou	杭州	
Fujian	福建	Fújiàn	閩 mǐn	Fuzhou	福州	(Note: Kinmen and Matsu Islands retained by the ROC. Provincial government suspended in 2019.)
Hebei	河北	Héběi	冀 jì	Qingyuan (Baoding)	清苑(保定)	
Heilongjiang	黑龍江	Hēilóngjiāng	黑 hēi	Bei'an	北安	
Hejiang	合江	Héjiāng	合 hé	Jiamusi	佳木斯	(Note: Now part of Heilongjiang)
Henan	河南	Hénán	豫 yù	Kaifeng	開封	
Hubei	湖北	Húběi	鄂 è	Wuchang	武昌	
Hunan	湖南	Húnán	湘 xiāng	Changsha	長沙	
Xing'an	興安	Xīng'ān	興 xīng	Hailar (Hulunbuir)	海拉爾(呼倫貝爾)	(Note: Now part of Heilongjiang and Jilin)
Jehol (Rehe)	熱河	Rèhé	熱 rè	Chengde	承德	(Note: Now part of Hebei, Liaoning, and Inner Mongolia)
Gansu	甘肅	Gānsù	隴 lǒng	Lanzhou	蘭州	
Jiangsu	江蘇	Jiāngsū	蘇 sū	Zhenjiang	鎮江	
Jiangxi	江西	Jiāngxī	贛 gàn	Nanchang	南昌	
Jilin	吉林	Jílín	吉 jí	Jilin	吉林	
Guangdong	廣東	Guǎngdōng	粵 yuè	Guangzhou	廣州	
Guangxi	廣西	Guǎngxī	桂 guì	Guilin	桂林	
Guizhou	貴州	Guìzhōu	黔 qián	Guiyang	貴陽	
Liaobei	遼北	Liáoběi	洮 táo	Liaoyuan	遼源	(Note: Now mostly part of Inner Mongolia)
Liaoning	遼寧	Liáoníng	遼 liáo	Shenyang	瀋陽	
Ningxia	寧夏	Níngxià	寧 níng	Yinchuan	銀川	
Nenjiang	嫩江	Nènjiāng	嫩 nèn	Qiqihar	齊齊哈爾	(Note: The province was abolished in 1950 and incorporated into Heilongjiang province.)
Shanxi	山西	Shānxī	晉 jìn	Taiyuan	太原	
Shandong	山東	Shāndōng	魯 lǔ	Jinan	濟南	
Shaanxi	陝西	Shǎnxī	陝 shǎn	Xi'an	西安	
Xikang	西康	Xīkāng	康 kāng	Kangding	康定	(Note: Now part of Tibet and Sichuan)
Xinjiang	新疆	Xīnjiāng	新 xīn	Dihua (Ürümqi)	迪化(烏魯木齊)	
Suiyuan	綏遠	Suīyuǎn	綏 suī	Guisui (Hohhot)	歸綏(呼和浩特)	(Note: Now part of Inner Mongolia)
Songjiang	松江	Sōngjiāng	松 sōng	Mudanjiang	牡丹江	(Note: Now part of Heilongjiang)
Sichuan	四川	Sìchuān	蜀 shǔ	Chengdu	成都	
Taiwan	臺灣	Táiwān	臺 tái	Taipei	臺北	(Note: Taiwan was only under ROC control after the surrender of Japan. Government suspended since 2018.)
Qinghai	青海	Qīnghǎi	青 qīng	Xining	西寧	
Yunnan	雲南	Yúnnán	滇 diān	Kunming	昆明	
Special Administrative Region
Hainan	海南	Hǎinán	瓊 qióng	Haikou	海口	
Regions
Mongolia Area (Outer Mongolia)	蒙古	Ménggǔ	蒙 méng	Kulun (now Ulaanbaatar)	庫倫	(Note: Now part of the State of Mongolia and the Russian republic of Tuva. As the successor of the Qing dynasty, the Government of the Republic of China claimed Outer Mongolia before 1946, and for a short time under the Beiyang government occupied it. The Nationalist government officially recognized Mongolia's independence after the 1945 Sino-Soviet Treaty of Friendship due to pressure from the Soviet Union.)
Tibet Area (Tibet)	西藏	Xīzàng	藏 zàng	Lhasa	拉薩	
Special Municipalities
Nanjing	南京	Nánjīng	京 jīng	(Qinhuai District)	秦淮區	
Shanghai	上海	Shànghǎi	滬 hù	(Huangpu District)	黄浦區	
Harbin	哈爾濱	Hā'ěrbīn	哈 hā	(Nangang District)	南崗區	
Shenyang	瀋陽	Shěnyáng	瀋 shěn	(Shenhe District)	瀋河區	
Dalian	大連	Dàlián	連 lián	(Xigang District)	西崗區	
Beijing (while capital)	北平	Běipíng	平 píng	(Xicheng District)	西城區	
Tianjin	天津	Tiānjīn	津 jīn	(Heping District)	和平區	
Chongqing	重慶	Chóngqìng	渝 yú	(Yuzhong District)	渝中區	
Hankou, Wuhan	漢口	Hànkǒu	漢 hàn	(Jiang'an District)	江岸區	
Guangzhou	廣州	Guǎngzhōu	穗 suì	(Yuexiu District)	越秀區	
Xi'an	西安	Xī'ān	安 ān	(Weiyang District)	未央區	
Qingdao	青島	Qīngdǎo	膠 jiāo	(Shinan District)	市南區	

=== Nobility ===
The Republic of China retained hereditary nobility like the Han Chinese nobles Duke Yansheng and Celestial Masters and Tusi chiefdoms like the Chiefdom of Mangshi, Chiefdom of Yongning, who continued possessing their titles in the Republic of China from the previous dynasties.

== Military ==
The number of soldiers China had full-time varied depending on the year but overall increased over time. By the mid-1930s close to when the Second Sino-Japanese War began, China had 2 million soldiers.

Military conscription was practiced in the Republic of China starting in March 1936 after a 1933 law was passed. All males between 18 and 45 were required to register for as citizen-soldiers where they would learn how to use weapons, build fortifications, execute basic orders, conduct reconnaissance and do liaison work. Able-bodied men from 20 to 25 were required to serve in the military for 3 years before becoming reservists which they would remain as until they were 45. Those being exempt from serving in the military were: only sons, high school graduates and above, students who were in high school or above, could not meet physical standards, "suffered from incurable diseases" and had special governmental appointments. One could also get a deferment if they were civil servants, "could not recover from any disease within months", teachers, "those who were not clear of suspicion for criminal offenses" or where half the sons in a given family were active duty soldiers. Those barred from military service were people who were serving a life sentence or "deprived of political rights".

=== Army ===
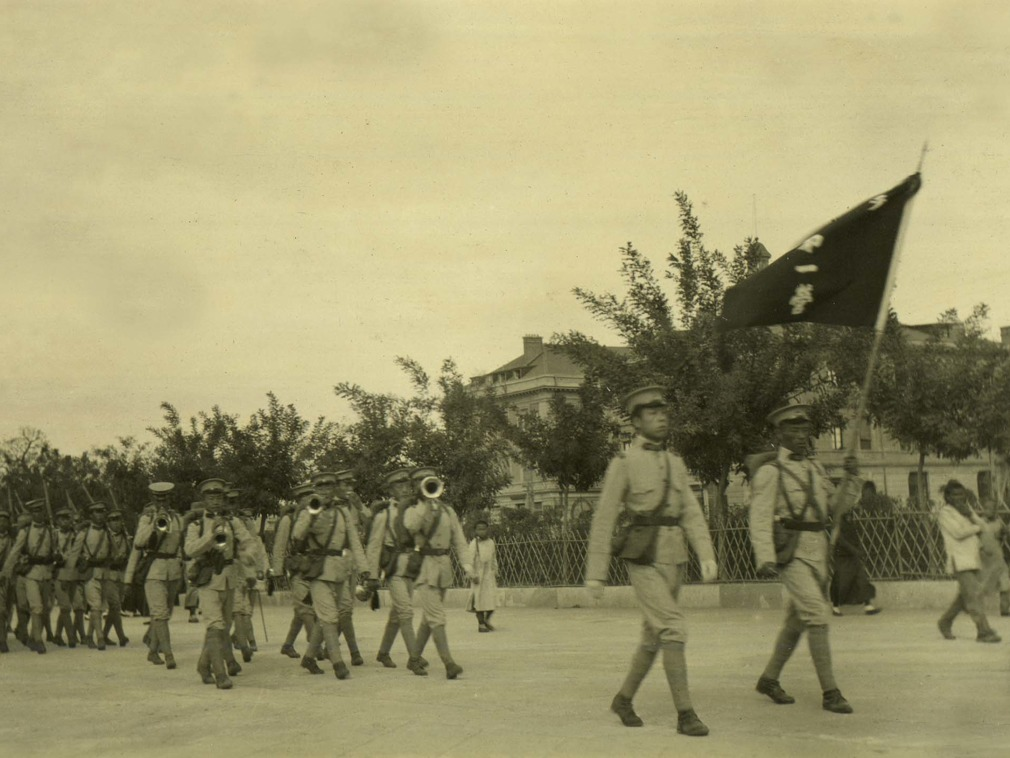
Beiyang Army troops in the 1920s

The Republic of China's military initially consisted of the decentralized forces of the former Qing dynasty, with the most modern and organized being the Beiyang Army, before it split into factions that attacked each other. During the Second Revolution in 1913, as the president of the republic, Yuan Shikai used the Beiyang Army to defeat provincial forces opposed to him and to extend his control over north China and other provinces as far south as the Yangtze River. This also led to the expansion of the size of the Beiyang Army, and an effort was made by Yuan to reduce provincial armies in areas he controlled, though they were not completely disbanded. Yuan ended the Qing practice of frequently rotating officers among command positions in the Beiyang divisions, which led to the subordinates developing personal loyalty to their commanders, whose units became their power base. He maintained control over the Beiyang Army by providing the division commanders with the patronage of the presidency, and had them keep each other in check. Yuan was unable to completely reorganize the fragmented command structure of China's military to be more of a bureaucratic institution under the direct control of the central government. After Yuan's death in 1916, the Beiyang Army split among different factions led by his generals that rivaled each other. Though they continued to control the central government in Beijing, they were unable to take over the south. The southern warlords had their own armies but they were also divided by conflicts among themselves. Despite the breakdown of centralized leadership, some military schools established during the Qing dynasty continued to function during the warlord era, including the Baoding Military Academy, which graduated the majority of officers that served in warlord armies and many that later became Nationalist officers.

Sun Yat-sen created a new government in 1917 as an alternative to the Beiyang, but he did not have the military power to control the southern warlords. Therefore, the National Revolutionary Army was established by Sun in 1924 in Guangdong with the goal of reunifying China under the Kuomintang, with Soviet advisors and equipment. To avoid the problems of warlord armies, the NRA was under the political and ideological control of a party, the KMT, and included party representatives in its ranks. After Sun's death in 1925, Chiang Kai-shek led the Nationalist Army in its first campaign against less organized warlord forces from 1926 to 1928, becoming known as the Northern Expedition. After the success of the Northern Expedition the National Revolutionary Army was seen as China's national army, despite warlords still controlling parts of the country. During the next decade the army was increased in size from 250,000 to around two million, organized into 200 divisions. In the 1930s a small number of these divisions received training from German instructors, as well as modern uniforms and weapons, as part of the process of creating a professional army. The Whampoa Military Academy had been established by Sun Yat-sen with Soviet assistance to provide officers for the KMT army, and in 1928 it was moved to Nanjing to become the Central Military Academy, where its size and training program was expanded by the Germans. But these German-trained forces represented a small part of the total KMT army, numbering about 40 divisions.

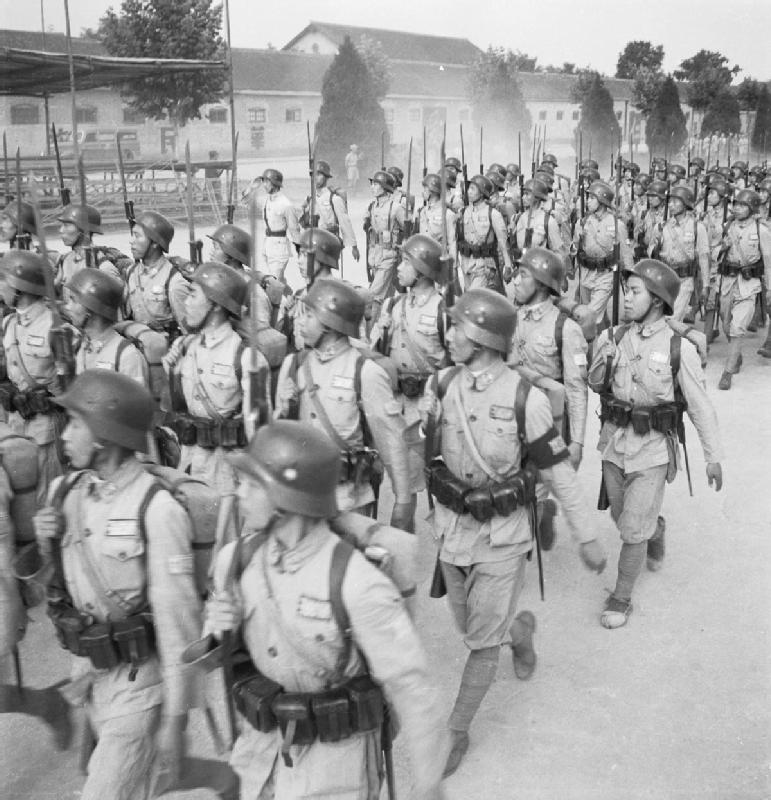
National Revolutionary Army (NRA) troops in 1944

When the war between Japan and China broke out in 1937, Chiang Kai-shek deployed his best divisions to central China, where they took heavy losses during the Battle of Shanghai and the following retreat. Half of the officers that graduated from the Central Military Academy were killed in the first few months of fighting. By 1941, the Chinese Nationalist Army had 3.8 million troops in 246 front-line divisions and 70 reserve divisions, though the majority of the divisions were under-strength and the troops were poorly trained. Many of these divisions were still more loyal to warlords than to Chiang Kai-shek. The US also provided military assistance to China, planning to equip 30 divisions, but the prioritization of the European theater and the logistical difficulties of getting the supplies to China prevented these plans from being fully carried out.

After the Battle of Wuhan in 1938, the Chinese Army tried to avoid direct large scale fighting with the Japanese. Chiang also wanted to preserve his army instead of engaging in ground operations, despite pressure from the American leadership to go on the offensive. It was not until early 1944 when Chiang agreed to launch a major offensive against Japanese forces in Burma to reopen the overland supply line to China, though it was unsuccessful. It took place around the same time as Japan's largest offensive since 1941, Operation Ichi-Go. The Japanese advanced rapidly in central and southeast China, as the Chinese Army still suffered from a lack of supplies, and by the start of 1945 they captured several U.S. air bases and created a direct connection to French Indochina. In early 1945, Chinese and Allied troops in Burma succeeded in opening a land route to India, allowing more equipment to be sent to the Chinese, which they used to stop Japanese advances in southeast China by May. They were planning an offensive to retake control of a port in southern China when Japan surrendered.

During the Second Sino-Japanese War, the armed forces of the CCP were nominally incorporated into the National Revolutionary Army, while remaining under separate command, but broke away to form the People's Liberation Army shortly after the end of the war. With the promulgation of the Constitution of the Republic of China in 1947 and the formal end of the KMT party-state, the National Revolutionary Army was renamed the Republic of China Armed Forces, with the bulk of its forces forming the Republic of China Army, which retreated to Taiwan in 1949 after their defeat in the Chinese Civil War. Units which surrendered and remained in mainland China were either disbanded or incorporated into the People's Liberation Army.

=== Navy ===
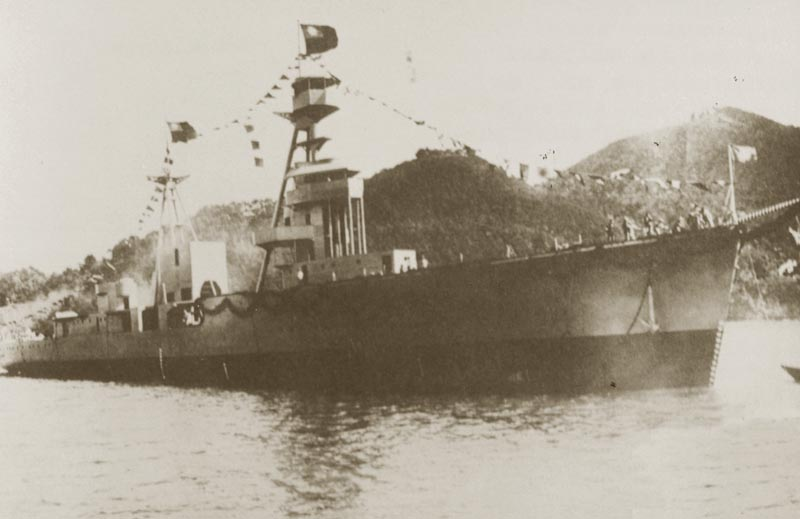
The cruiser Ning Hai was the Chinese navy's flagship in the early 1930s.

The Republic of China's Navy during between 1911 and 1949 was primarily composed of ships from the Qing Dynasty or ships obtained from foreign countries. As most threats to the Republic were on land from the warlords and the Communists there was no interest in developing any maritime strategies. No significant efforts were made during this period to grow the navy because of China being in a state of general disarray. Sometimes warlords did use maritime forces but mainly as a way of supporting land combat. When Sun Yat-sen established his constitutional protection government in Guangzhou in 1917, some of his early support came from the Chinese navy, represented by admirals Cheng Biguang and Lin Baoyi. In 1926, Admiral Yang Shuzhuang led some elements of the Beiyang Fleet to defect to the National Revolutionary Army and became the head of the revolutionary navy on the Yangtze River. One of Admiral Yang's subordinates was Chen Shaokuan, who became the commander of the ROC Navy in 1932 and remained in that position until after the war with Japan. During the 1930s he organized the Chinese navy into the Central, Northeast, and Guangdong Fleets. Between 1931 and 1933 the United Kingdom had a naval mission in China where the United Kingdom attempted to help the Chinese and vice versa but the mission failed.

Chiang Kai-shek announced in 1928 that it was his intention to build a large navy for China, but this goal was undermined by financial problems and other difficulties. Many senior officers did not have modern naval training, and newer officers that were educated in Western countries were not promoted. When the war with Japan broke out, the majority of the Chinese fleet was used during the Battle of Shanghai to slow down the Japanese advance along the Yangtze River. Many ships were sunk by Japanese aircraft or were sunk deliberately by the Chinese to use as blockships in the Yangtze. By 1939 most of the Chinese navy had been destroyed, with one estimate claiming that over 100 of the navy's 120 ships in 1937 had been sunk. Some Chinese warships (notably the cruisers Ning Hai and Ping Hai) were later refloated and put into service by the Imperial Japanese Navy. The building of a Chinese navy was no longer a priority during the rest of the war, and in 1940 Chiang Kai-shek disbanded the Ministry of the Navy.

In 1945, Chiang revived plans to create a modern Chinese Navy and asked the United States for assistance. The Nationalists received over 100 ships from the U.S. and its allied countries, as well as some captured Axis ships. Before the end of 1945 a navy training center was established in Qingdao by the US Navy. The new navy was mainly used to transport troops and patrol the coastline during the Chinese Civil War. In 1948, the former British cruiser HMS Aurora was gifted to China and was renamed Chongqing, becoming the flagship of the ROCN. In February 1949, as Chinese Communist forces advanced to the Yangtze River from the north, a mutiny of sailors occurred on Chongqing and the flagship defected to the Communists. This was followed in April by a mutiny of the entire fleet along the Yangtze, which was led by its commander to the other side. Because of this, 23 April 1949 is considered the founding date of the People's Liberation Army Navy. At the end of the war the rest of the ROCN moved Nationalist troops from the mainland to Taiwan.

The ROC Marine Corps was created from the former Naval Guard Corps, and consisted of two marine brigades, which were used during the war against Japan in several provinces before the corps was disbanded in 1946. In 1947, a reorganized Republic of China Marine Corps was created by the commander of the Navy using select personnel from the Army.

=== Air force ===
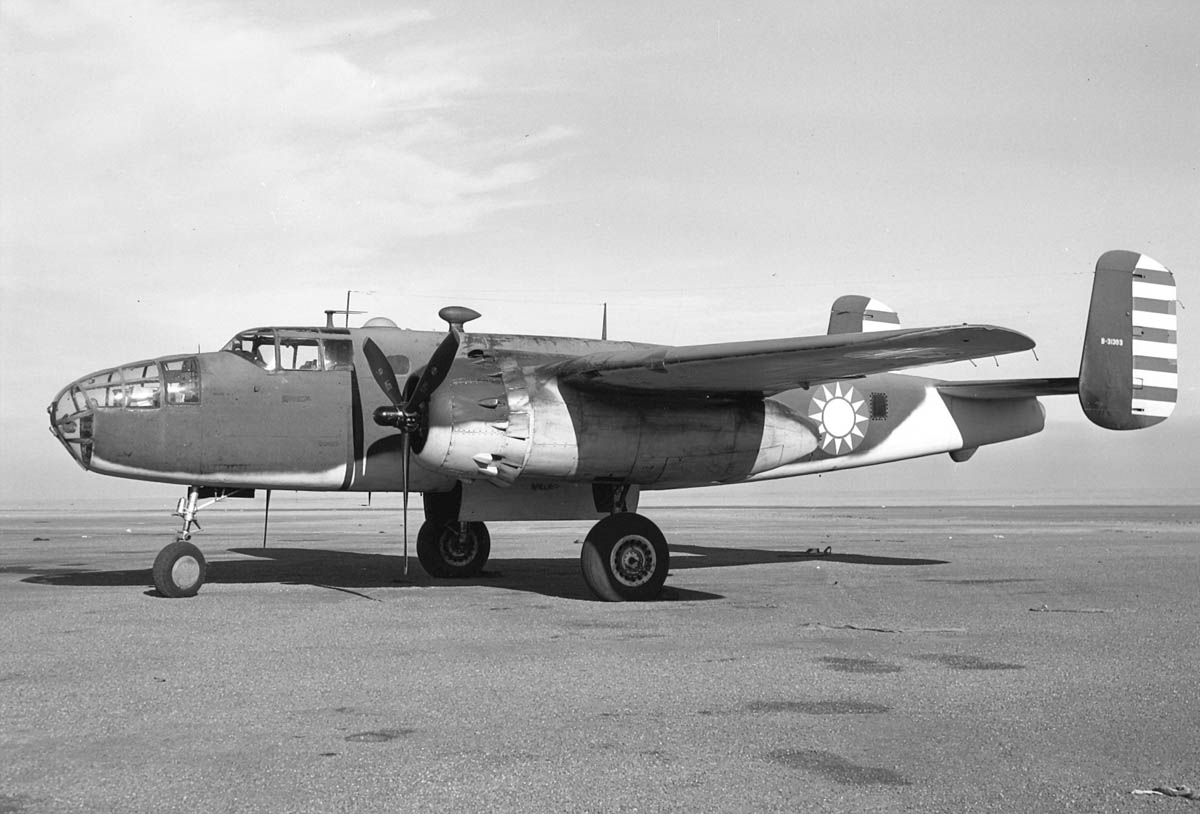
B-25 Mitchell bomber with Chinese Nationalist insignia

The Republic of China Air Force during the Second-Sino Japanese War was outmatched by the Japanese aviation forces. Foreign advisors from Germany, France, Italy, and the United Kingdom came to China in the 1930s; while foreign aircraft were also imported from a variety of countries. With the beginning of the war they began to rely most heavily on the United States and Soviet Union for advisors. The low amount of planes being domestically produced would prove to be a hindrance.

Beginning in 1929, the Nationalist government started expanding its air power to improve its position over warlords and the Communists. The ROC Air Force was formally established in April 1929, and that month the aviation department of the Ministry of War was separated as the National Aviation Administration, with General Chang We-chang as its head. He started a program of buying American aircraft, with the first, Vought Corsair planes, arriving in early 1930. The Chinese Air Force expanded from the first 12 Corsair planes in 1930 to a size of eight squadrons, with seven of bomber-observation planes and one of pursuit planes, in 1931, with a total of 40 to 50 aircraft. Several American pilots became advisors to China's air force and fought in battles against the Japanese or warlords. The Nationalist Air Force had a role in the Central Plains War of 1930 by bombing cities, directing artillery, and observing warlord army defensive positions, and is credited with helping bring about a faster victory for Chiang Kai-shek's government. It had less success against the Japanese during the Shanghai Incident in 1932.

In September 1932, the Central Aviation School was founded with the help of an American mission led by John Jouett, and its graduates included the majority of Chinese pilot officers by 1937. On his recommendation, the ROCAF was restructured, with a Ministry of Aviation equal to that of the Military and Navy Ministries being established under the Military Affairs Commission. Additional planes were purchased, and factories were also opened in China. As of 1936, the Chinese Air Force had 645 aircraft, and multiple factories and schools.

When the war with Japan broke out in July 1937, much of the ROC Air Force was destroyed during the fighting in central China by December of that year. From 1938 to 1940 the Soviet Volunteer Group did much of the fighting against the Japanese, along with the remnants of the ROCAF. The Soviets sent 885 planes to China over those years.

== Economy ==
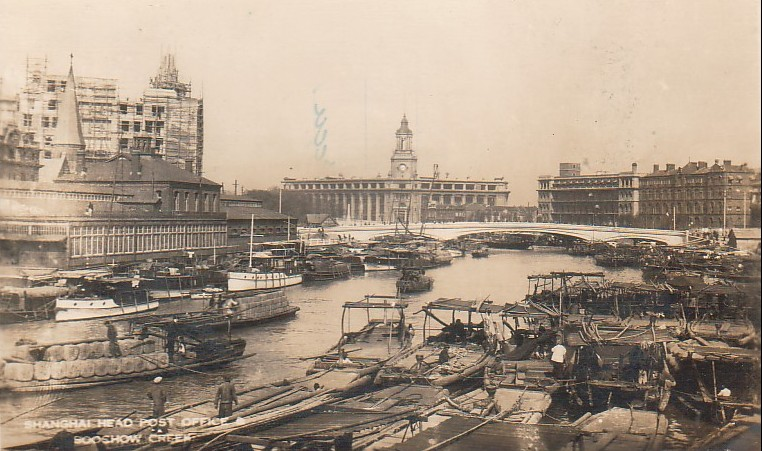
Boat traffic and development along Suzhou Creek, Shanghai, 1920

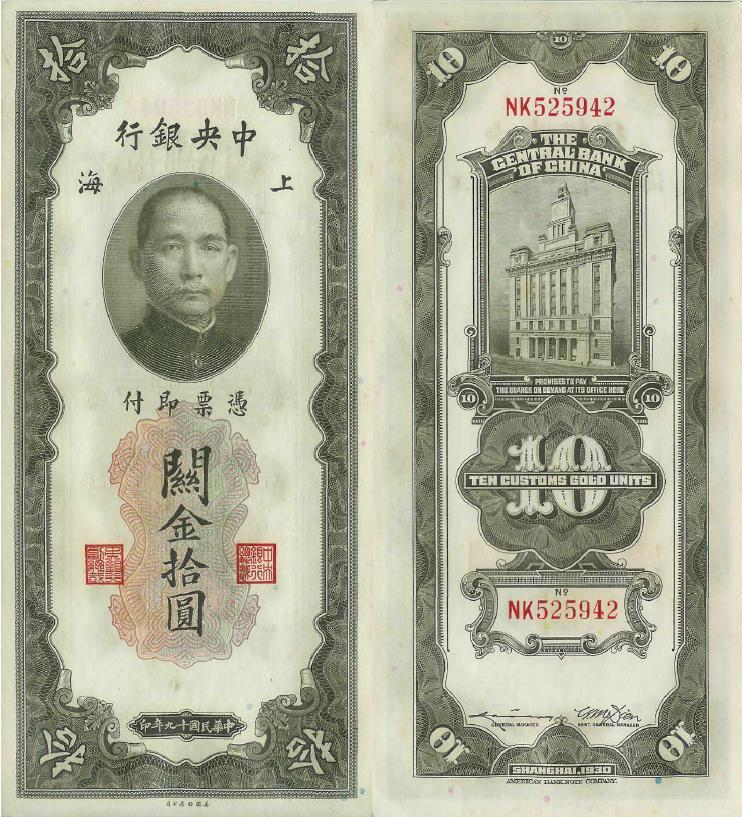
A 10 Custom Gold Units bill, 1930

In the early years of the Republic of China, the economy remained unstable as the country was marked by constant warfare between different regional warlord factions. The Beiyang government in Beijing experienced constant changes in leadership, and this political instability led to stagnation in economic development until Chinese reunification in 1928 under the Kuomintang. After this reunification, China entered a period of relative stability—despite ongoing isolated military conflicts and in the face of Japanese aggression in Shandong and Manchuria, in 1931—a period known as the "Nanjing Decade".

Chinese industries grew considerably from 1928 to 1931. While the economy was hit by the Japanese occupation of Manchuria in 1931 and the Great Depression from 1931 to 1935, industrial output recovered to their earlier peak by 1936. This is reflected by the trends in Chinese GDP. In 1932, China's GDP peaked at 28.8 billion, before falling to 21.3 billion by 1934 and recovering to 23.7 billion by 1935. By 1930, foreign investment in China totaled 3.5 billion, with Japan leading (1.4 billion) followed by the United Kingdom (1 billion). By 1948, however, the capital investment had halted and dropped to only 3 billion, with the US and Britain being the leading investors.

However, the rural economy was hit hard by the Great Depression of the 1930s, in which an overproduction of agricultural goods lead to falling prices for China as well as an increase in foreign imports (as agricultural goods produced in western countries were "dumped" in China). In 1931, Chinese imports of rice amounted to 21 million bushels compared with 12 million in 1928. Other imports saw even more increases. In 1932, 15 million bushels of grain were imported compared with 900,000 in 1928. This increased competition lead to a massive decline in Chinese agricultural prices and thus the income of rural farmers. In 1932, agricultural prices were at 41 percent of 1921 levels. By 1934, rural incomes had fallen to 57 percent of 1931 levels in some areas.

In 1937, the Second Sino-Japanese War began with a Japanese invasion of China, and the resulting warfare laid waste to China. Most of the prosperous east coast was occupied by the Japanese, who committed atrocities such as the Nanjing massacre. In one anti-guerilla sweep in 1942, the Japanese killed up to 200,000 civilians in a month. The war was estimated to have killed between 20 and 25 million Chinese, and destroyed all that Chiang had built up in the preceding decade. Development of industries was severely hampered after the war by devastating civil conflict as well as the inflow of cheap American goods. By 1946, Chinese industries operated at 20% capacity and had 25% of the output of pre-war China.

One effect of the war with Japan was a massive increase in government control of industries. In 1936, government-owned industries were only 15% of GDP. However, the ROC government took control of many industries to fight the war. In 1938, the ROC established a commission for industries and mines to supervise and control firms, as well as instilling price controls. By 1942, 70% of Chinese industry was owned by the government.

Following the surrender of Japan in World War II, Japanese Taiwan was placed under the control of the ROC. In the meantime, the KMT renewed its struggle with the communists. However, the corruption and hyperinflation as a result of trying to fight the civil war, resulted in mass unrest throughout the Republic and sympathy for the communists. In addition, the communists' promise to redistribute land gained them support among the large rural population. In 1949, the communists captured Beijing and later Nanjing. The People's Republic of China was proclaimed on 1 October 1949. The Republic of China relocated to Taiwan where Japan had laid an educational groundwork.

=== Transportation ===
China's infrastructure would grow dramatically during this period. The railroad network length grew from 9,600 kilometres (6,000 mi) in 1912 to 25,000 kilometres (16,000 mi) by 1945. The Shanxi warlord Yan Xishan was known for his strong commitment toward developing railroads. During the Nanjing decade the length of the highway network grew from 1,000 kilometres (620 mi) to 109,000 kilometres (68,000 mi) while growth was also seen in navigable waterways. In the early 1930s, a Sichuan warlord named Liu Xiang was strongly committed toward creating an entirely Chinese navigation company and eliminating foreign-owned companies in the Yangtze River basin.

=== Communications ===
The Republic of China had a national postal system which began under the Qing Dynasty and carried over into the Republican period. The postal service did pull of Manchuria when the Japanese did invade it in 1931 and in Mongolia in 1924. The postal service continued to operate in other areas of the country even when they were taken by the Japanese and eventually began offering their services once again in Manchuria. In rural areas the postal service even offered free deliveries.

Radio had been previously experimented with during the Qing Dynasty and work continued into the Republican era. Radio stations began appearing in the 1920s being mainly concentrated in Shanghai. The Kuomintang would create a national radio program, the Central China Broadcasting Station (CCBS). The CBBS held programs that related to the news, education and entertainment along with putting the news in difference dialects of Chinese. However, those who actually listened to the radio in China were predominantly in the urban areas. Most radios were foreign made and little were made domestically.

=== Foreign aid ===
The bilateral agreement between the Republic of China and the United States on the utilization of Economic Cooperation Administration (ECA) funds was signed in Nanjing on 3 July 1948. Ambassador John Leighton Stuart signed for the United States and Foreign Minister Wang Shijie for China. Roger D. Lapham, director of ECA for China, was present at the ceremony. The agreement, which had been under negotiation in Nanjing for several weeks, was signed just in time to conform with the 3 July deadline provided in the United States aid bill. Of $400,000,000 voted for China, the pact would govern the use of $275,000,000 for economic assistance. China would get $120,000,000 to use as she sees fit. This would go for military supplies purchased in the United States. The terms of the agreement were similar to those concluded between the United States and European nations. The funds for economic aid, with the exception of a small part devoted to special projects, were gifts, and were not to be repaid. The agreement was valid for two years. China contracts, as far as practicable, to make use of her natural and financial resources and her assets in the United States belonging to Chinese nationals, to adopt measures for the creation of a more stable currency, to promote production and improve conditions of foreign trade. Some commodities provided by the United States under the aid program would be sold and the agreement provided that Chinese currency funds from sales would be dealt with by a later arrangement, through the withdrawal of notes from circulation to reduce Chinese inflation or allocations to reconstruction projects. China undertook to adopt measures to improve conditions for foreign trade by private enterprises in China, including a "fair and equitable" administration of import and export controls and the allocation of foreign exchange resources.

== Culture ==
Prior to the fall of the Qing dynasty, interaction and trade with western countries was more common in China than it had been in previous times. This led to greater cultural influence from the west in China. The culture of China and daily life within the country was disrupted from its previous state by the fall of dynastic rule. The Republic of China maintained the increase of western cultural influence in the country. Chinese intellectuals of the time were not unified in their opinions on the cultural changes occurring in the newly founded state. Some took progressive stances and advocated for Art Reform, while more conservative intellectuals believed China should maintain older Chinese traditions.

Motion pictures were introduced to China in 1896. They were introduced through foreign film exhibitors in treaty ports like Shanghai and Hong Kong. Chinese-made short melodrama and comedy films began emerging in 1913. Chinese film production developed significantly in the 1920s. Throughout the 1920s and 1930s, filmmaking in China was largely done by film studios and there was comparatively little small scale filmmaking. Upscale movie theaters in China had contracts which required them to exclusively show Hollywood films, and thus as of the later 1920s, Hollywood films accounted for 90% of screen time in Chinese theaters. After the Japanese invasion of China in 1937, a large number filmmakers left to join the War of Resistance, with many going to the Nationalist-controlled hinterlands to join the Nationalist film studios Central Motion Picture Studio or China Motion Picture Studio. A smaller number went to Yan'an or Hong Kong.

During the Nanjing government, the ROC launched a cultural campaign promoting the "Arts of the Three Principles of the People." It sought (mostly unsuccessfully) to attract cultural workers to create new propaganda works and more successfully established a censorship apparatus directed against unwelcome cultural products, especially left-wing artists and their works.

== See also ==
- 100th Anniversary of the Xinhai Revolution and Republic of China
- Administrative divisions of the Republic of China (1912–1949)
- Sino-Soviet relations
- History of China–United States relations
- Republic of China calendar
- Censorship in the Republic of China (1912–1949)
- Century of humiliation
- China Development Finance Corporation
- East–West cultural debate
- Eastward spread of Western learning
- Foreign concessions in China
- Latinxua Sin Wenz
- Map of National Shame
- National Anthem of the Republic of China
- National Flag Anthem of the Republic of China
- National seals of the Republic of China
- Orders, decorations, and medals of the Republic of China
- Vice Premier of the Republic of China
- Timeline of the Republic of China
- Project National Glory
- Second Historical Archives of China
- Revive China Society
- Hongmen
- Gelaohui
- Tongmenghui
