= Provisional government of the Republic of China (1912–1913) =

Provisional government led by the Tongmenghui from 1912–1913

Republic of China 中華民國
- 1912–1913
- Flag Emblem
- Anthem: "Song of Five Races Under One Union" (1912–1913); "Song to the Auspicious Cloud" (1913)
- Territory claimed by the provisional government
- Capital: Nanjing (1912); Beijing (1912–1913)
- Common languages: Chinese language
- Demonym: Chinese
- Government: Provisional government
- President
  - 1912 (first): Sun Yat-sen
  - 1912–1913 (last): Yuan Shikai
- Premier
  - 1912 (first): Tang Shaoyi
  - 1913 (last): Xiong Xiling
- Legislature: Provisional Senate (1912–1913); National Assembly (1913)
- History
  - Wuchang Uprising: 10 October 1911
  - Presidential inauguration of Sun Yat-sen: 1 January 1912
  - Government moved to Beijing: 10 March 1912
  - First National Assembly session: 8 April 1913
  - Disestablished: 10 October 1913
- Currency: Chinese yuan
Preceded by	Succeeded by
Qing government	Beiyang government; Constitutional Protection junta

The provisional government (Chinese: 臨時政府) of the Republic of China (Chinese: 中華民國) was established by Sun Yat-sen in Nanjing after the defeat of the Qing dynasty in the Xinhai Revolution. After the success of the Wuchang Uprising, revolutionary provincial assembly representatives held a conference in the district of Wuchang, China, which framed the organizational outline of the provisional government. The government was integrated into the Beiyang government after the revolutionaries agreed to back Yuan Shikai.

== History ==
=== Planning ===
In November 1911, the revolutionary group in the Wuchang District of Wuhan, China, led by Li Yuanhong came together with the revolutionary group in Shanghai led by Chen Qimei and Cheng Dequan (程德全) to prepare for the establishment of a new central government. The districts of Wuhan would unify in 1927. The group in Wuchang wanted to establish a government in Wuchang, while the group in Shanghai wanted a government in Shanghai. By November 20 the two groups compromised and recognized Hubei as the central government and proposed everyone go to Wuchang. By November 28, Hankou and Hanyang had fallen back to the Qing, so for safety the revolutionaries convened their first conference at the British concession in Hankou on November 30. Tan Renfeng (譚人鳳) was the chairman of the session. Twenty-three representatives from the 11 provinces participated. The representatives decided to frame the organizational outline of the provisional government, and they elected Lei Fen (雷奮), Ma Junwu, and Wang Zhengting (王正廷) to prepare the draft.

Because on December 2, the revolutionary forces were able to capture Nanjing in the uprising, the revolutionaries decided to make it the site of the new provisional government. The conference passed the outline the very next day, which consisted three chapters and twenty-one clauses. It also confirmed that the new government would be a republic. It was announced that the provincial representatives would meet in Nanjing in seven days to elect a provisional government.

=== President selection ===
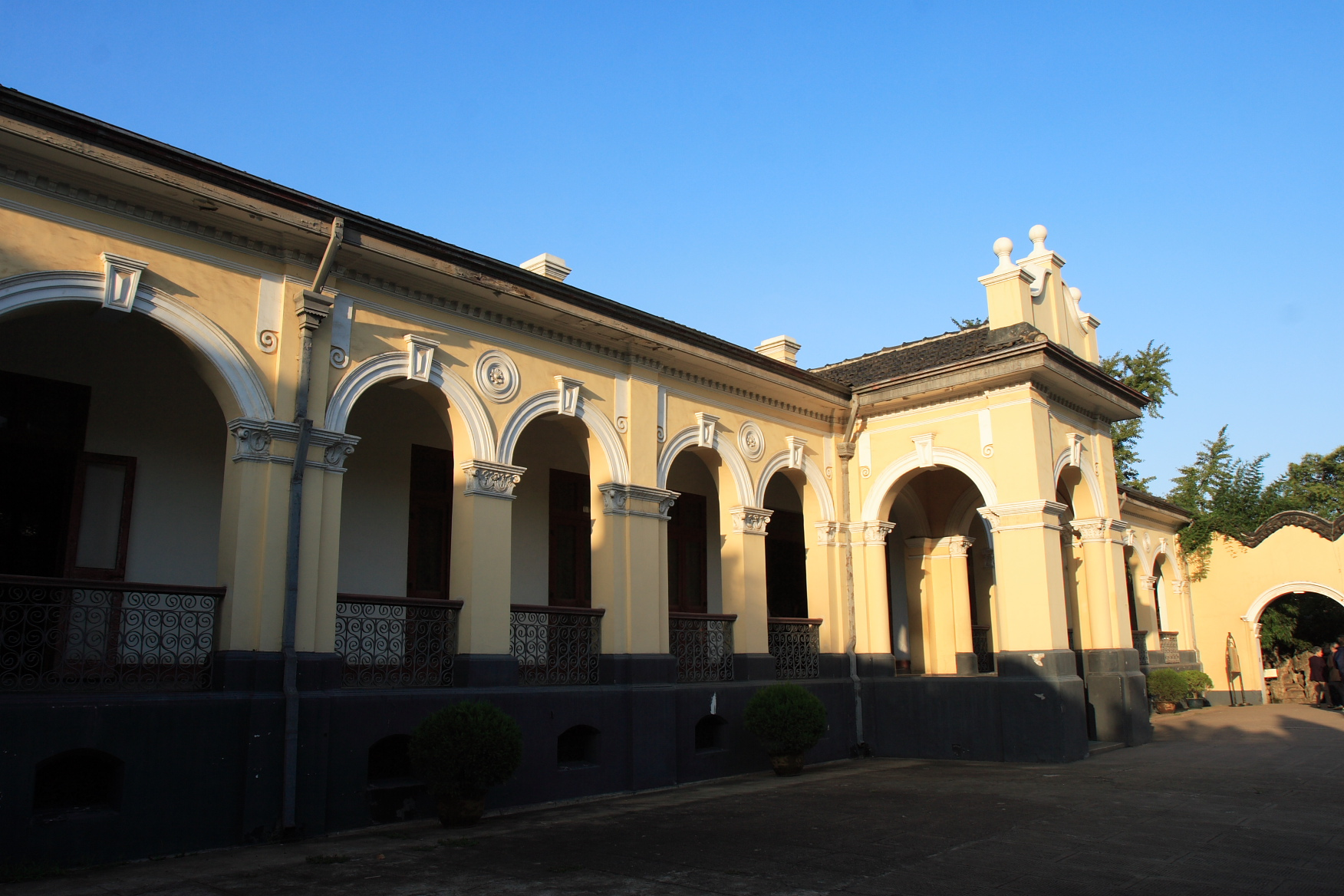
Sun Yat-sen's office at the Presidential Palace, Nanjing

Instead of attending Nanjing's assembly, Song Jiaoren and Chen Qimei gathered the provincial representatives in Shanghai and held an assembly on December 4. On December 25, Sun Yat-sen, accompanied by general Homer Lea, his closest foreign adviser, returned to Shanghai. On December 29, the presidential election was held in Nanjing. According to the first article of the "Provisional Government Organization Outline", the Provisional President was to be elected by representatives from the provinces of China; the candidate who received more than 2/3 of the votes would be elected. Each province was entitled to one vote only. 45 representatives from seventeen provinces participated in this election, and Sun Yat-sen received 16 valid votes out of 17.

=== Establishment of government ===
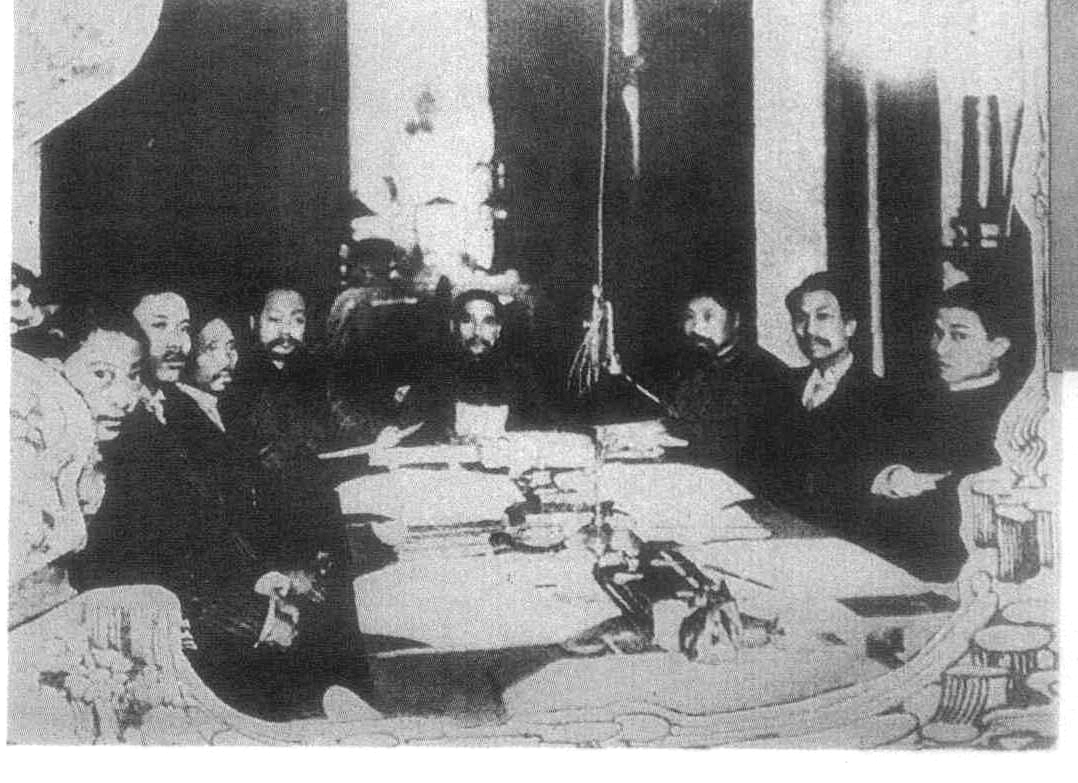
A conference of the provisional government cabinets in Nanjing

On 1 January 1912, Sun Yat-sen announced the establishment of the Republic of China in Nanjing, and he was inaugurated as the Provisional President of the Republic. General Li Yuanhong was made Provisional Vice President. Under the provisional government, there were ten ministries:

- Huang Xing was appointed both as the Minister of the Army and as Chief of Staff
- Huang Zhongying as the Minister of the Navy
- Wang Chonghui as the Minister of Foreign Affairs
- Wu Tingfang as the Minister of the Judiciary
- Chen Jingtao as the Minister of Finance
- Cheng Dequan as the Minister of Internal Affairs
- Cai Yuanpei as the Minister of Education
- Zhang Jian as the Minister of Commerce
- Tang Soqian as the Minister of Communications.

There were additional appointments, such as Hu Hanmin as the Secretary of the President, Song Jiaoren as the Director-general of Law-making, and Huang Fusheng as the Director-general of Printing. The speaker of the Provisional Senate was Lin Sen.

=== Northern transition ===
==== Dong'anmen Gate incident ====
From the beginning, revolutionaries tried to lure Yuan Shikai to the south: by making Yuan the president of the southern Nanjing-based provisional government, he would give up his military power base in the north, however. In February 1912, troops looted shops and stole from rich commercial areas in Peiping. They then burned down the Dong'anmen gate (東安門) on the wall surrounding the Imperial City. Thousands of people were killed. This mutiny was actually ordered by Yuan and Cao Kun; by doing so, they meant to intimidate the revolutionaries and made it clear that the new government would have to go to him in Beijing—he was not going to the south. This was also an excuse to move the capital of the new republic from Nanjing back to Beijing.

==== End of provisional government ====
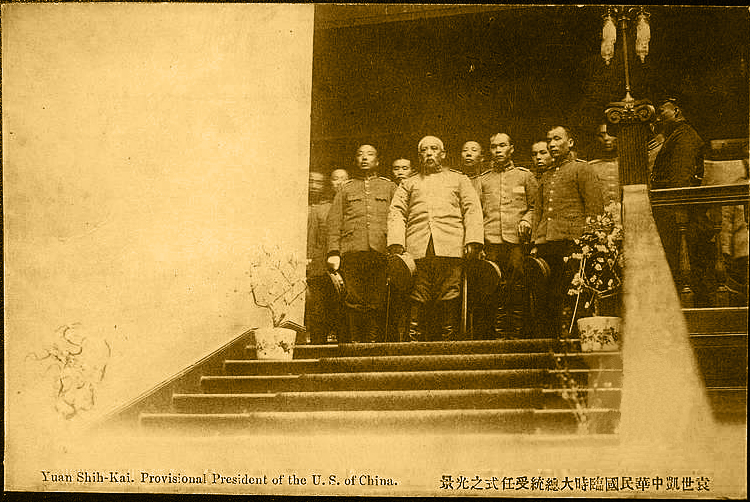
Provisional President Yuan Shikai

Yuan Shikai, the Premier of the Qing government, negotiated with the revolutionaries in exchange of the post of the president. Avoiding a civil war, the revolutionaries agreed to Yuan's plan of the unified China under Yuan's government. On 8 March 1912 the Provisional Senate passed the Provisional Constitution to limit Yuan's power in the future. On March 10, the Senate elected Yuan as the second Provisional President of the Republic. The power of the Nanjing Government and the Provisional Senate hence transitioned to the Beiyang government in Beijing, which signified the dissolution of the provisional government. The transition to the north in the next few years would be challenging with factions, warlords, constitutional movements and many other issues.

== See also ==
- Provisional Constitution of the Republic of China
- History of the Republic of China
