= Song of Five Races Under One Union =

National anthem of the Republic of China (1912-13)

Wǔzú gònghé gē
English: Song of Five Races Under One Union
- 五族共和歌
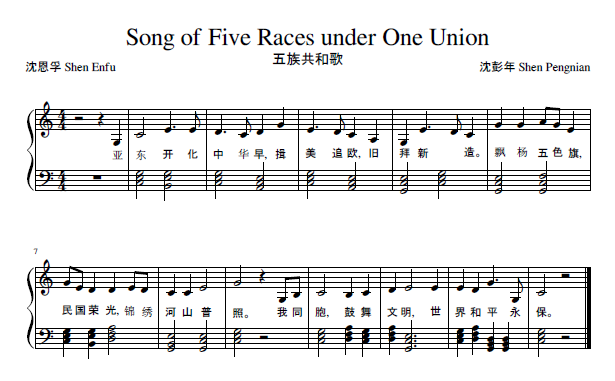
- Sheet music
- Former national anthem of China
- Lyrics: Shen Enfu
- Music: Shen Pengnian
- Adopted: 1912
- Relinquished: April 28, 1913

Instrumental recording of the anthem

The Song of Five Races Under One Union (Chinese: 五族共和歌; pinyin: Wǔzú gònghé gē) is a former national anthem of China. It was created in 1912 and used by the Provisional Government in Nanjing until the adoption of the Song to the Auspicious Cloud in 1913.

== History ==
After the establishment of the provisional government in Nanjing, the Ministry of Education under Cai Yuanpei asked the public for possible anthems (as well as coats of arms), and "Song of Five Races under One Union", with lyrics by Shen Enfu (沈恩孚) and music by Shen Pengnian (沈彭年), was released as a draft in the newspaper.

== Lyrics ==
Traditional

亞東開化中華早，
揖美追歐，
舊邦新造。
飄揚五色旗，
民國榮光
錦繡河山普照。
吾同胞，
鼓舞文明，
世界和平永保。

Hanyu Pinyin

Yà dōng kāihuà Zhōnghuá zǎo,
yī Měi zhuī Ōu,
jiù bāng xīnzào.
Piāoyáng wǔsè qí,
mínguó róngguāng,
jǐnxiù héshān pǔzhào.
Wú tóngbāo,
gǔwǔ wénmíng,
shìjiè hépíng yǒngbǎo.

English translation

China, East Asia’s earliest civilisation,
Admiring America while chasing Europe,
As the old nation is being rebuilt.
The Five Colored Flag flutters high,
The Glory of the Republic
shines over its beautiful mountains and rivers.
My fellow compatriots,
let us all invigorate our civilisation,
so that peace is protected for the whole world.

Preceded by "Gong Jin'ou" (1911–1912)	"Song of Five Races Under One Union"; 1912–1913	Succeeded by "Song to the Auspicious Cloud" (1913–1915)
