= Song to the Auspicious Cloud =

Historical Chinese national anthem

- Traditional Chinese: 卿雲歌
- Simplified Chinese: 卿云歌
- Literal meaning: 'Auspicious cloud song'
Transcriptions
Standard Mandarin
- Hanyu Pinyin: Qīngyúngē
- Wade–Giles: Ch‘ing^{1}-yün^{2}-ko^{1}
- IPA: [tɕʰíŋ.y̌n.kɤ́]
Yue: Cantonese
- Yale Romanization: Hīng'wàhngō
- Jyutping: hing1 wan4 go1
- IPA: [hɪŋ˥.wɐn˩.kɔ˥]
Southern Min
- Hokkien POJ: Kheng-hûn-koa

The Song to the Auspicious Cloud (Chinese: 卿雲歌; pinyin: Qīngyúngē; lit. 'Auspicious cloud song') was the title of two historical national anthems of the Republic of China. The first version was composed in 1896 by Jean Hautstont, a Belgian composer and esperantist, and was in use from 1913 to 1915 as a provisional anthem. The second version, composed by Xiao Youmei, was in use from 1921 to 1928 as an official national anthem. The lyrics of both songs were based on the Commentary of Shang Shu (尚書大傳) written by Fu Sheng in 200–100 BCE.

== History ==
The lyrics of the two versions of the Song to the Auspicious Cloud were based on a song recorded in the Commentary of Shang Shu, which was said to have been sung by the ancient Emperor Shun upon his abdication in favor of Yu the Great. Its original lyrics in classical Chinese were:

卿雲爛兮，糺縵縵兮。日月光華，旦復旦兮。
"How bright is the Auspicious Cloud, How broad is its brilliancy.
The light is spectacular with sun or moon, How it revives dawn after dawn."

The song's imagery symbolized the transfer of monarchical power under the abdication system of succession, which, according to Chinese legends, supposedly predated hereditary dynastic succession. After the end of the monarchy and the establishment of the republic, many favored the new government's adoption of the classical song's lyrics as the national anthem.

== First version (1913–1915) ==
卿雲歌
English: Song to the Auspicious Cloud (first version)
- Former national anthem of China
- Music: Jean Hautstont
- Adopted: April 28, 1913
- Relinquished: May 23, 1915

Audio sample
- "Song to the Auspicious Cloud" (first version): file; help

A national anthem committee was established in July 1912 by Cai Yuanpei, the Minister of Education of the Republic of China. Representative Wang Rongbao (汪榮寶), added another quotation from Emperor Shun: "時哉夫，天下非一人之天下也" (Time has changed, the whole nation is no longer owned by one person.) in the last line of "Song to the Auspicious Cloud" and invited Jean Hautstont, a Belgian composer and esperantist, to compose an anthem. On April 8, 1913, the national anthem was used in opening ceremony of the first regular council. It was a provisional anthem until "China Heroically Stands in the Universe" became the national anthem of the Republic of China on May 23, 1915.

Traditional Chinese	Pinyin	English translation
卿雲爛兮， 糺縵縵兮﹐ 日月光華﹐ 旦復旦兮。 時哉夫，天下非一人之天下也。	Qīngyún làn xī, Jiū mànmàn xī, Rìyuè guānghuá, Dàn fù dàn xī. Shí zāi fú, tiānxià fēi yīrén zhī tiānxià yě.	How bright is the Auspicious Cloud! How broad is the brilliancy! The light is spectacular with sun or moon. How it revives dawn after dawn! Time has changed, the whole nation is no longer owned by one person.

== Second version (1921–1928) ==
卿雲歌
English: Song to the Auspicious Cloud (second version)
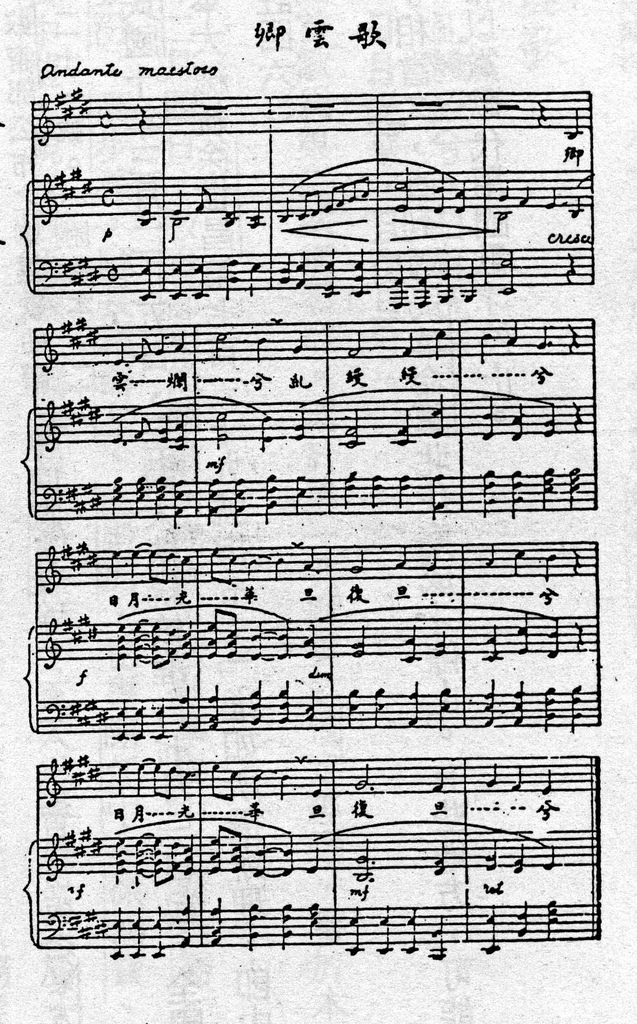
- Second version of "Song to the Auspicious Cloud"
- Former national anthem of China
- Music: Xiao Youmei
- Adopted: March 31, 1921
- Relinquished: 1928

Audio sample
- "Song to the Auspicious Cloud" (second version): file; help

Instrumental recording of the anthem

In November 1919, Duan Qirui established the National Anthem Research Committee (國歌研究會), which adopted the second version of the "Song to the Auspicious Cloud". Lyrics (1920) by Zhang Taiyan from the classic "the Song to the Auspicious Cloud" (卿雲歌) from the Commentary of Shangshu. Music (1921) by Xiao Youmei.

It was selected to be the official anthem on March 31, 1921, by No.759 presidential decree, and was released in July 1921 by the Department of National Affairs (國務院).

Traditional Chinese	Pinyin	English translation
卿雲爛兮， 糺縵縵兮。 日月光華﹐ 旦復旦兮； 日月光華﹐ 旦復旦兮。	Qīngyún làn xī, Jiū mànmàn xī, Rìyuè guānghuá, Dàn fù dàn xī; Rìyuè guānghuá, Dàn fù dàn xī.	How complete is the Auspicious Cloud! Slowly but surely growing. Sun nor Moon diminish its brilliancy Dawn after dawn! Sun nor Moon diminish its brilliancy Dawn after dawn!

- ¹糺 (jiū "collaborate") is sometimes written as 糾 (jiū "investigate") or 織 (zhī "to web")

It was replaced with the current national anthem of the Republic of China, which is also the Kuomintang party anthem, in 1928, as a result of the Northern Expedition from 1926 to 1928 and the overthrow of the government. However, during the Second Sino-Japanese War, several collaborationist governments established by the Japanese army, such as the Provisional Government of the Republic of China and the Reformed Government of the Republic of China, readopted this anthem, along with other pre-KMT republican symbols.

== See also ==
- Historical Chinese anthems
- Order of Propitious Clouds

Preceded by Song of Five Races Under One Union (1912–1913)	Song to the Auspicious Cloud; 1913–1915	Succeeded by China Heroically Stands in the Universe (1915–1921)
Preceded by China Heroically Stands in the Universe (1915–1921)	Song to the Auspicious Cloud; 1921–1928	Succeeded by Three Principles of the People (1928–Now)
