= China Heroically Stands in the Universe =

Former Chinese national anthem

Zhōngguó xióng lì yǔzhòu jiān
English: China Heroically Stands in the Universe
- 中華雄立宇宙間
- Former national anthem of China
- Lyrics: Yin Chang
- Music: Wang Lu
- Adopted: 23 May 1915
- Relinquished: 1 July 1921

Audio sample
- "China Heroically Stands in the Universe": file; help

China Heroically Stands in the Universe
- Traditional Chinese: 中華雄立宇宙間
- Simplified Chinese: 中华雄立宇宙间
Transcriptions
Standard Mandarin
- Hanyu Pinyin: Zhōnghuá xióng lì yǔzhòu jiān
- Wade–Giles: Chunghua Hsiung Li Yüchou Chien

"China Heroically Stands in the Universe" (Traditional Chinese): 中華雄立宇宙間, romanized: Zhōngguó xióng lì yǔzhòu jiān) was the national anthem of China from 1915 to 1921. It was adopted as the official anthem of the Chinese state with the establishment of the short-lived Hongxian Empire of China under Yuan Shikai and his Beiyang government. After Yuan's death in 1916, the anthem remained official until it was replaced under the order of premier Duan Qirui in 1921.

== History ==
It was issued by the Ritual Regulations Office (禮制館) in June 1915 as the national anthem of the Republic of China and was adopted on 23 May 1915. Its lyrics were written by Yin Chang (廕昌) and music by Wang Lu (王露).

After Yuan Shikai declared himself Emperor of China in December 1915, the lyrics of the anthem were slightly modified and turned into the national anthem of the Empire of China. The lyrics were abolished again in 1916 after his death and replaced by lyrics written by Zhang Zuolin. The song was no longer the official anthem after 31 March 1921, when Song to the Auspicious Cloud again became the national anthem.

== Lyrics ==
=== Original Lyrics during the Republic of China (May–Dec. 1915) ===
Traditional Chinese

中國雄立宇宙間，
廓八埏，
華冑來從崑崙巔，
江湖浩蕩山綿連，
五族共和開堯天，
億萬年

Pinyin

Zhōngguó xióng lì yǔzhòu jiān,
Kuò bā yán,
Huá zhòu lái cóng Kūnlún diān,
Jiāng hú hào dàng shān mián lián,
Wǔzú gònghé kāi yáo tiān,
Yì wàn nián.

English translation

China heroically stands in the universe,
Extending to the Eight Corners,
Descendants come from Kunlun Peak.
The rivers turn great and the mountains continue.
Five races open up the sky of Yao,
For many years to come.

=== Lyrics during the Empire of China (1916) ===
Traditional Chinese

中國雄立宇宙間，
廓八埏，
華冑來從崑崙巔，
江湖浩蕩山綿連，
勳華揖讓開堯天，
億萬年。

Pinyin

Zhōngguó xióng lì yǔzhòu jiān,
Kuò bā yán,
Huá zhòu lái cóng Kūnlún diān,
Jiāng hú hào dàng shān mián lián,
Xūn huá Yī Ràng kāi yáo tiān,
Yì wàn nián.

English translation

China heroically stands in the universe,
Extending to the Eight Corners,
Descendants come from Kunlun Peak.
The rivers turn great and the mountains continue.
Shanrang* open up the sky of Yao,
For many years to come.

- Shanrang (Demise) referred to the ancient system of Chinese emperors relinquishing their positions to each other in Yao and Shun's era.

=== Lyrics during the Republic of China (1916–1921) ===
Traditional Chinese

中華雄立宇宙間，
萬萬年！
保衛人民中不偏，
諸業發達江山固，
四海之內太平年，
萬萬年！

Pinyin

Zhōnghuá xióng lì yǔzhòu jiān,
Wàn wàn nián!
Bǎowèi rénmín zhōng bùpiān,
Zhūyè fādá jiāngshān gù,
Sìhǎi zhī nèi tàipíng nián,
Wàn wàn nián!

English translation

China heroically stands in the universe,
For many years to come.
Defend the people with no bias.
Industries prosper and the nation is solid.
Peace and tranquility within four seas,
For many years to come.

== See also ==
- Historical Chinese anthems

Preceded by Song to the Auspicious Cloud (1912–1915)	China Heroically Stands in the Universe; 1915–1921	Succeeded by Song to the Auspicious Cloud (1921–1928)
