= List of Chinese provincial-level divisions by population =

Administrative divisions in mainland China by population (2013).

Average Annual Population Growth Rate in each province, municipality, and autonomous region in mainland China between 2010 and 2020 according to the Chinese National Bureau of Statistics

This is a list of Chinese administrative divisions in order of their total resident populations. It includes all provinces, autonomous regions, direct-controlled municipalities and special administrative regions controlled by the Republic of China (1912–1949) or the People's Republic of China (1949–present). For the Republic of China after 1949, see List of administrative divisions of Taiwan.

== Current population ==
Data are for mid-year 2022 and are from the National Bureau of Statistics of China unless otherwise specified.

Type	Colour
Municipalities	
Autonomous Regions	
Special Administrative Regions	

Division	Total	Urban	Rural	Ref
Mainland China	1,433,802,600	937,590,000	508,960,000	
Guangdong	127,060,000	94,650,000	31,920,000	
Shandong	101,630,000	65,590,000	36,040,000	
Henan	101,113,000	56,330,000	42,390,000	
Jiangsu	85,150,000	63,370,000	21,780,000	
Sichuan	83,740,000	48,860,000	34,880,000	
Hebei	74,200,000	45,750,000	28,450,000	
Hunan	66,040,000	39,830,000	26,210,000	
Zhejiang	65,770,000	48,260,000	17,510,000	
Anhui	61,270,000	36,860,000	24,410,000	
Hubei	58,440,000	37,790,000	20,650,000	
Guangxi	50,470,000	28,090,000	22,380,000	
Yunnan	46,930,000	24,270,000	22,660,000	
Jiangxi	45,280,000	28,110,000	17,170,000	
Liaoning	41,970,000	30,640,000	11,330,000	
Fujian	41,880,000	29,370,000	12,510,000	
Shaanxi	39,560,000	25,320,000	14,240,000	
Guizhou	38,560,000	21,140,000	17,420,000	
Shanxi	34,810,000	22,260,000	12,550,000	
Chongqing	32,130,000	22,800,000	9,330,000	
Heilongjiang	30,990,000	20,520,000	10,470,000	
Xinjiang	25,870,000	14,980,000	10,890,000	
Gansu	24,920,000	13,510,000	11,410,000	
Shanghai	24,750,000	22,110,000	2,640,000	
Inner Mongolia	24,010,000	16,470,000	7,540,000	
Jilin	23,480,000	14,960,000	8,520,000	
Beijing	21,840,000	19,130,000	2,710,000	
Tianjin	13,630,000	11,600,000	2,030,000	
Hainan	10,270,000	6,310,000	3,960,000	
Hong Kong	7,472,600			(Note: Data are from Census and Statistics Department (Hong Kong).)
Ningxia	7,280,000	4,830,000	2,450,000	
Qinghai	5,950,000	3,660,000	2,290,000	
Tibet	3,640,000	1,360,000	2,280,000	
Macau	677,300			(Note: Data are from Statistics and Census Service (Macau).)

== Population of divisions within regions ==
Color	Regions of China
	North China
	East China
	Southwestern China
	Northwestern China
	South Central China
	Northeast China

Division	Region	Total	Urban	Rural	Ref
Mainland China		1,433,802,600	937,590,000	508,960,000	
Guangdong	South Central China	126,570,000	94,650,000	31,920,000	
Shandong	East China	101,630,000	65,590,000	36,040,000	
Henan	South Central China	98,720,000	56,330,000	42,390,000	
Jiangsu	East China	85,150,000	63,370,000	21,780,000	
Sichuan	Southwestern China	83,740,000	48,860,000	34,880,000	
Hebei	North China	74,200,000	45,750,000	28,450,000	
Hunan	South Central China	66,040,000	39,830,000	26,210,000	
Zhejiang	East China	65,770,000	48,260,000	17,510,000	
Anhui	East China	61,270,000	36,860,000	24,410,000	
Hubei	South Central China	58,440,000	37,790,000	20,650,000	
Guangxi	South Central China	50,470,000	28,090,000	22,380,000	
Yunnan	Southwestern China	46,930,000	24,270,000	22,660,000	
Jiangxi	East China	45,280,000	28,110,000	17,170,000	
Liaoning	Northeast China	41,970,000	30,640,000	11,330,000	
Fujian	East China	41,880,000	29,370,000	12,510,000	
Shaanxi	Northwestern China	39,560,000	25,320,000	14,240,000	
Guizhou	Southwestern China	38,560,000	21,140,000	17,420,000	
Shanxi	North China	34,810,000	22,260,000	12,550,000	
Chongqing	Southwestern China	32,130,000	22,800,000	9,330,000	
Heilongjiang	Northeast China	30,990,000	20,520,000	10,470,000	
Xinjiang	Northwestern China	25,870,000	14,980,000	10,890,000	
Gansu	Northwestern China	24,920,000	13,510,000	11,410,000	
Shanghai	East China	24,750,000	22,110,000	2,640,000	
Inner Mongolia	North China	24,010,000	16,470,000	7,540,000	
Jilin	Northeast China	23,480,000	14,960,000	8,520,000	
Beijing	North China	21,840,000	19,130,000	2,710,000	
Tianjin	North China	13,630,000	11,600,000	2,030,000	
Hainan	South Central China	10,270,000	6,310,000	3,960,000	
Hong Kong	South Central China	7,472,600			(Note: Data are from Census and Statistics Department (Hong Kong).)
Ningxia	Northwestern China	7,280,000	4,830,000	2,450,000	
Qinghai	Northwestern China	5,950,000	3,660,000	2,290,000	
Tibet	Southwestern China	3,640,000	1,360,000	2,280,000	
Macau	South Central China	677,300			(Note: Data are from Statistics and Census Service (Macau).)

== Census data ==
Administrative Division	2020	2010	2000	1990	1982	1964	1954	1947	1936–37	1928	1912
People's Republic of China (Note: Population controlled by People's Republic of China and including Hong Kong and Macau)	1,419,993,000	1,347,339,000	1,273,050,000	1,160,017,381	1,031,882,511	723,070,269	601,938,035				
Republic of China (Note: Population controlled by Republic of China)								457,111,000	469,203,000	464,904,000	410,143,000
Guangdong (Note: Hainan Province was part of Guangdong Province until 1988) (Note: Guangzhou was separate from Guangdong Province from 1947-1954)	126,012,510	104,303,132	85,225,007	62,829,236	59,299,220	42,800,849	34,770,059	27,210,000	32,453,000	32,428,000	28,011,000
Shandong (Note: Qingdao part of Shandong Province until 1929; dissolved in 1949 and incorporated into Shandong) (Note: Weihai also known as Weihaiwei. Established in 1930; dissolved in 1945 and incorporated into Shandong)	101,527,453	95,793,065	89,971,789	84,392,827	74,419,054	55,519,038	48,876,548	38,865,000	38,100,000	28,672,000	30,989,000
Henan	99,365,519	94,023,567	91,236,854	85,509,535	74,422,739	50,325,511	44,214,594	29,654,000	34,290,000	30,566,000	28,518,000
Jiangsu (Note: Shanghai was part of Jiangsu Province until 1927) (Note: Nanjing part of Jiangsu Province until 1927; dissolved in 1952 and incorporated into Jiangsu)	84,748,016	78,659,903	73,043,577	67,056,519	60,521,114	44,504,608	41,252,192	36,080,000	36,469,000	34,126,000	32,283,000
Sichuan (Note: Chongqing was part of Sichuan Province until 1939 and 1954 to 1997)	83,674,866	80,418,200	82,348,296	107,218,173	99,713,310	67,956,490	62,303,999	47,437,000	52,706,000	47,992,000	48,130,000
Hebei (Note: Hebei was known as Zhili until 1928) (Note: Beijing was part of Hebei Province until 1928) (Note: Tianjin was part of Hebei Province until 1928 and 1954 to 1967)	74,610,235	71,854,202	66,684,419	61,082,439	53,005,876	45,687,781	35,984,644	28,719,000	28,644,000	31,232,000	26,658,000
Hunan	66,444,864	65,683,722	63,274,173	60,659,754	54,008,851	37,182,286	33,226,954	25,558,000	28,294,000	31,501,000	27,617,000
Zhejiang	64,567,588	54,426,891	45,930,651	41,445,930	38,884,603	28,318,573	22,865,747	19,959,000	21,231,000	20,643,000	21,440,000
Anhui	61,027,171	59,500,510	58,999,948	56,180,813	49,665,724	31,241,657	30,343,637	22,462,000	23,354,000	21,715,000	16,229,000
Hubei (Note: Wuhan (Hankou) part of Hubei Province until 1927; dissolved in 1949 and incorporated into Hubei)	58,300,000	57,237,740	59,508,870	53,969,210	47,804,150	33,709,344	27,789,693	20,976,000	25,516,000	26,699,000	29,590,000
Guangxi (Note: Autonomous Region)	50,126,804	46,026,629	43,854,538	42,245,765	36,420,960	20,845,017	19,560,822	14,636,000	13,385,000	13,648,000	7,879,000
Yunnan	47,209,277	45,966,239	42,360,089	36,972,610	32,553,817	20,509,525	17,472,737	9,066,000	12,042,000	13,821,000	9,468,000
Jiangxi	45,188,635	44,567,475	40,397,598	37,710,281	33,184,827	21,068,019	16,772,865	12,507,000	15,805,000	20,323,000	23,988,000
Liaoning (Note: Liaoning was known as Fengtian until 1929) (Note: Shenyang part of Liaoning Province until 1947; dissolved in 1954 and incorporated into Liaoning) (Note: Dalian part of Liaoning Province until 1947; dissolved in 1954 and incorporated into Liaoning)	42,591,407	43,746,323	41,824,412	39,459,697	35,721,693	26,946,200	18,545,147	10,007,000	15,254,000	15,233,000	12,133,000
Fujian (Note: Most of Fujian is controlled by the People's Republic of China since 1949 while the Republic of China retained control of Kinmen, Matsu and Wuqiu islands as part of its Fujian Province.)	41,540,086	36,894,216	34,097,947	30,097,274	25,931,106	16,757,223	13,142,721	11,143,000	11,756,000	10,071,000	15,849,000
Shaanxi (Note: Xi'an part of Shaanxi Province until 1947; dissolved in 1954 and incorporated into Shaanxi)	39,528,999	37,327,378	35,365,072	32,882,403	28,904,423	20,766,915	15,881,281	10,011,000	9,780,000	11,802,000	9,364,000
Guizhou	38,562,148	35,806,468	35,247,695	32,391,066	28,552,997	17,140,521	15,037,310	10,174,000	9,919,000	14,746,000	9,665,000
Shanxi	34,915,616	37,022,111	32,471,242	28,759,014	25,291,389	18,015,067	14,314,485	15,247,000	11,601,000	12,228,000	10,082,000
Chongqing (Note: Direct-controlled municipality)	32,054,159	28,846,170	30,512,763	*	*	*	*	986,000	*	*	*
Heilongjiang (Note: Established in 1923; dissolved in 1932 and incorporated into Manchukuo / Heilongjiang (present)) (Note: Harbin part of Heilongjiang Province until 1947-1949 and 1953-1954)	31,850,088	38,312,224	36,237,576	35,214,873	32,665,546	20,118,271	11,897,309	2,844,000	3,751,000	3,725,000	2,029,000
Xinjiang	25,852,345	21,813,334	18,459,511	15,155,778	13,081,681	7,270,067	4,873,608	4,047,000	4,360,000	2,552,000	2,098,000
Gansu (Note: Ningxia was part of Gansu until 1929 and 1954-1958)	25,019,831	25,575,254	25,124,282	22,371,141	19,569,261	12,630,569	12,928,102	7,091,000	6,716,000	6,281,000	4,990,000
Shanghai	24,870,895	23,019,148	16,407,734	13,341,896	11,859,748	10,816,458	6,204,417	4,630,000	3,727,000	*	*
Jilin	24,073,453	27,462,297	26,802,191	24,658,721	22,560,053	15,668,663	11,290,073	6,465,000	7,354,000	7,635,000	5,580,000
Inner Mongolia	24,049,155	24,706,321	23,323,347	21,456,798	19,274,279	12,348,638	6,100,104	*	*	*	*
Beijing (Note: Beijing was known as Beiping in 1928 until 1949)	21,893,095	19,612,368	13,569,194	10,819,407	9,230,687	7,568,495	2,768,149	1,722,000	1,551,000	*	*
Tianjin	13,866,009	12,938,224	9,848,731	8,785,402	7,764,141	*	2,693,831	1,773,000	1,218,000	*	*
Hainan (Note: Prior to 1996, Pratas Island was part of the Republic of China's nominal Hainan Special Administrative Region. The administration of the island was transferred to Kaohsiung Municipality.)	10,081,232	9,261,518	7,559,035	6,557,482	*	*	*	*	*	*	*
Hong Kong (Note: Special Administrative Region of China since 1 July 1997; previously, from 26 January 1841 until 1 July 1997 known as British Hong Kong.)	7,474,200	7,061,200	6,708,389								
Ningxia	7,202,654	6,176,900	5,486,393	4,655,451	3,895,578	*	*	759,000	978,000	1,450,000	303,000
Qinghai	5,923,957	5,626,722	4,822,963	4,456,946	3,895,706	2,145,604	1,676,534	1,308,000	1,196,000	619,000	368,000
Tibet (Note: Controlled by Kingdom of Tibet from 1912 to 1951. Controlled by People's Republic of China after 1951)	3,648,100	3,002,166	2,616,329	2,196,010	1,892,393	1,251,225	1,273,969				
Macau (Note: Special Administrative Region of China since 20 December 1999; previously, from 1557 until 20 December 1999 known as Portuguese Macau.)	683,218	552,503	435,235								
Rehe (Note: Incorporated into a province in 1928; dissolved in 1955 and incorporated into Hebei, Liaoning, & Inner Mongolia)	*	*	*	*	*	*	5,160,822	6,197,000	6,593,000	4,630,000	
Xikang (Note: Incorporated into a province in 1939; dissolved in 1955 and incorporated into Sichuan and Tibet)	*	*	*	*	*	*	3,381,064	1,697,000	890,000	*	
Qahar (Note: Incorporated into a province in 1928; dissolved in 1952 and incorporated into Inner Mongolia, Beijing & Hebei)	*	*	*	*	*	*	*	2,186,000	1,997,000	1,622,000	
Suiyuan (Note: Incorporated into a province in 1928; dissolved in 1954 and incorporated into Inner Mongolia)	*	*	*	*	*	*	*	2,233,000	2,124,000	630,000	
Nanjing	*	*	*	*	*	*	*	1,114,000	*	*	
Qingdao	*	*	*	*	*	*	*	851,000	*	*	
Xi'an (Note: Xi'an fail to split from Shannxi in 1933; Xi'an was known as Xijing in 1933 until 1943)	*	*	*	*	*	*	*	628,000	*	*	
Dongsheng	*	*	*	*	*	*	*	*	*	*	
Weihai	*	*	*	*	*	*	*	222,000	*	*	
Liaodong (Note: Liaodong was known as Andong in 1947 until 1949) (Note: Split from Liaoning Province in 1947; dissolved in 1954 and incorporated into Liaoning)	*	*	*	*	*	*	*	2,992,000	*	*	
Liaobei (Note: Split from Liaoning Province in 1947; dissolved in 1949 and incorporated into Inner Mongolia and Liaoning)	*	*	*	*	*	*	*	4,629,000	*	*	
Songjiang (Note: Split from Jilin Province in 1947; dissolved in 1955 and incorporated into Heilongjiang)	*	*	*	*	*	*	*	2,571,000	*	*	
Hejiang (Note: Split from Jilin Province in 1947; dissolved in 1949 and incorporated into Songjiang)	*	*	*	*	*	*	*	1,841,000	*	*	
Nenjiang (Note: Split from Heilongjiang Province in 1947; dissolved in 1949 and incorporated into Heilongjiang)	*	*	*	*	*	*	*	3,333,000	*	*	
Xing'an (Note: Split from Heilongjiang Province in 1947; dissolved in 1949 and incorporated into Inner Mongolia)	*	*	*	*	*	*	*	328,000	*	*	
Guangzhou	*	*	*	*	*	*	*	1,128,000	*	*	
Wuhan (Note: Part of Wuhan was known as Hankou)	*	*	*	*	*	*	*	722,000	*	*	
Shenyang	*	*	*	*	*	*	*	1,021,000	*	*	
Dalian (Note: Dalian was known as Lüda (Lyuda) in 1950 until 1954)	*	*	*	*	*	*	*	544,000	*	*	
Harbin	*	*	*	*	*	*	*	760,000	*	*	
Taiwan (Note: Controlled by Japan from 17 April 1895 until 25 October 1945. Controlled by Republic of China after 25 October 1945.)							7,591,298				
