= History of the administrative divisions of China (1949–present) =

Map comparing administrative divisions as drawn by current PRC and the ROC before 1946.

Claimed divisions of the PRC in 1949.

Claimed divisions of the PRC in 1950.

Claimed divisions of the PRC in 1966.

Claimed divisions of the PRC in 1979.

The Chinese Communist Party (CCP) initially held scattered fragments of mainland China at the start of the Chinese Civil War. By the establishment of the People's Republic of China in October 1949, the CCP controlled the majority of mainland China, forcing the Republic of China government to retreat to Taiwan.

== Founding ==
The Government of China made the following changes:

- China was divided into 6 greater administrative areas (大行政区 dà xíngzhèngqū) that came above provinces.
- Manchuria was reorganized completely.
- Inner Mongolia was formed out of parts of Manchuria as the first autonomous region.
- The short-lived province Pingyuan was set up.
- Jiangsu was temporarily divided into two administrative regions: Subei and Sunan.
- Anhui was temporarily divided into two administrative regions: Wanbei and Wannan.
- Sichuan was temporarily divided into four administrative regions: Chuandong, Chuannan, Chuanxi and Chuanbei.

== 1950s ==
In 1952, the provinces of Jiangsu, Anhui and Sichuan were restored. Pingyuan and Chahar were split into their surrounding provinces. Nanjing, the old capital of the Republic of China, was deprived of its municipality status and annexed by Jiangsu province. In 1953, Changchun and Harbin were elevated to municipality status.

In 1954, a massive campaign to cut the number of provincial-level divisions was initiated. Of the 14 municipalities existing in 1953, 11 were annexed by nearby provinces, with only Beijing, Shanghai, and Tianjin remaining. The province of Liaoning was formed out of the merger of Liaodong and Liaoxi, while Songjiang, Suiyuan and Ningxia disappeared into Heilongjiang, Inner Mongolia and Gansu, respectively.

The greater administrative area level was abolished in 1954. After they were abolished, various government statistics and documents continued to use them as a matter of convenience.

The process continued in 1955 with Rehe being split among Hebei, Liaoning and Inner Mongolia, and Xikang disappearing into Sichuan. In that same year Xinjiang became the second autonomous region of China, and plans for a third, Tibet Autonomous Region, were initiated. Qamdo territory was put under the planned Tibet Autonomous Region.

In 1957 two more autonomous regions were added, Ningxia (split back out of Gansu) and Guangxi (which was previously a province). In 1958 Tianjin was annexed by Hebei, leaving only two municipalities, Beijing and Shanghai. During the Great Leap Forward, townships were abolished and people's communes were introduced.

== 1960s and 1970s ==
In 1965 Tibet Autonomous Region was established out of the formerly self-governing Tibet Area, as well as the Qamdo Territory. In 1967 Tianjin was split back out as a municipality. In 1969, as part of the Cultural Revolution, Inner Mongolia was truncated; Hulunbuir was ceded to Heilongjiang, Jirim to Jilin, Juuuda to Liaoning, and the Alxa League split between Ejin Banner going to Gansu and the Alashan Region to Ningxia. This was reversed in 1979.

== 1980s, 1990s and 2000s ==
Starting in the 1980s, prefecture-level cities and county-level cities began to appear in very large numbers, usually by replacing entire prefectures and counties. People's communes ceased to exist due to the 1982 constitution and were replaced by townships. Hainan and some other islands were split out of Guangdong and set up as a Hainan Province in 1988.

In 1997, Chongqing became the fourth municipality of China. In that same year Hong Kong reverted to Chinese rule and became the first special administrative region. Macau became the second in 1999.

In the 1990s, there was a campaign to abolish district public offices as a level. By 2004 very few remained.

In the meantime, most prefectures have become prefecture-level cities.

== List of all provincial-level divisions since 1949 ==
abolished present claimed

Administrative divisions of China
Greater Administrative Areas
Name	Simplified Hanzi	Traditional Hanzi	Pinyin	Translation	Capital	Simplified Hanzi	Traditional Hanzi	Notes	
Huabei	华北	華北	Huáběi	"North China"	Beijing	北京	北京	1949–1954	
Dongbei	东北	東北	Dōngběi	"Northeast"	Shenyang	沈阳	瀋陽	1949–1954	
Huadong	华东	華東	Huádōng	"East China"	Shanghai	上海	上海	1949–1954	
Zhongnan	中南	中南	Zhōngnán	"South Central"	Wuhan	武汉	武漢	1949–1954	
Xibei	西北	西北	Xīběi	"Northwest"	Xi'an	西安	西安	1949–1954	
Xinan	西南	西南	Xīnán	"Southwest"	Chongqing	重庆	重慶	1949–1954	
Name	Simplified Hanzi	Traditional Hanzi	Pinyin	Abbreviation	Capital	Simplified Hanzi	Traditional Hanzi	GAA	Note
Provinces
Andong	安东	安東	Āndōng	安 ān	Tonghua	通化	通化	Dongbei	1949 abolished → Liaodong, Jilin
Anhui	安徽	安徽	Ānhuī	皖 wǎn	Hefei	合肥	合肥	Dongbei	1949 abolished → Wanbei, Wannan; 1952 reverted
Chahar	察哈尔	察哈爾	Cháhā'ěr	察 chá	Zhangjiakou	张家口	張家口	Huabei	1952 abolished → Inner Mongolia, Hebei
Fujian	福建	福建	Fújiàn	闽 mǐn	Fuzhou	福州	福州	Huadong	The majority of Fujian is controlled by the PRC, while the ROC still retains control of Kinmen, Wuqiu and Matsu Islands under its Fujian Province
Gansu	甘肃	甘肅	Gānsù	甘 gān	Lanzhou	兰州	蘭州	Xibei	1958 Ningxia split into its own autonomous region
Guangdong	广东	廣東	Guǎngdōng	粤 yuè	Guangzhou	广州	廣州	Zhongnan	1952 & 1965 Fangchenggang, Qinzhou, Beihai → Guangxi; 1955 reverted 1988 Hainan split into its own province
Guangxi	广西	廣西	Guǎngxī	桂 guì	Nanning	南宁	南寧	Zhongnan	1958 province → autonomous region
Guizhou	贵州	貴州	Guìzhōu	黔 qián	Guiyang	贵阳	貴陽	Xinan	
Hainan	海南	海南	Hǎinán	琼 qióng	Haikou	海口	海口	Zhongnan	
Hebei	河北	河北	Héběi	冀 jì	Baoding (49–54; 67–68); Tianjin (54–67); Shijiazhuang (present)	保定 天津 石家庄	保定 天津 石家莊	Huabei	1967 Tianjin split into its own municipality
Hejiang	合江	合江	Héjiāng	合 hé	Jiamusi	佳木斯	佳木斯	Dongbei	1949 abolished → Heilongjiang
Heilongjiang	黑龙江	黑龍江	Hēilóngjiāng	黑 hēi	Qiqihar (49–54); Harbin (present)	齐齐哈尔 哈尔滨	齊齊哈爾 哈爾濱	Dongbei	1952 part of Xing'an split into Inner Mongolia
Henan	河南	河南	Hénán	豫 yù	Kaifeng (49–54); Zhengzhou (present)	开封 郑州	開封 鄭州	Zhongnan	
Hubei	湖北	湖北	Húběi	鄂 è	Wuhan	武汉	武漢	Zhongnan	
Hunan	湖南	湖南	Húnán	湘 xiāng	Changsha	长沙	長沙	Zhongnan	
Jiangsu	江苏	江蘇	Jiāngsū	苏 sū	Nanjing	南京	南京	Huadong	1949 abolished → Subei, Sunan; 1952 reverted
Jiangxi	江西	江西	Jiāngxī	赣 gàn	Nanchang	南昌	南昌	Huadong	
Jilin	吉林	吉林	Jílín	吉 jí	Jilin (49–54); Changchun (present)	吉林 长春	吉林 長春	Dongbei	1952 north part split into Inner Mongolia
Liaobei	辽北	遼北	Liáoběi	洮 táo	Liaoyuan	辽源	遼源	Dongbei	1949 abolished → Jilin, Liaoning
Liaodong	辽东	遼東	Liáodōng	关 guān	Dandong	丹东	丹東	Dongbei	1954 abolished → Liaoning
Liaoning	辽宁	遼寧	Liáoníng	辽 liáo	Shenyang	沈阳	瀋陽	Dongbei	1949 abolished → Liaodong, Liaoxi; 1954 reverted 1952 north part split into Inner Mongolia
Liaoxi	辽西	遼西	Liáoxī	辽 liáo	Jinzhou	锦州	錦州	Dongbei	1954 abolished → Liaoning
Nenjiang	嫩江	嫩江	Nènjiāng	嫩 nèn	Qiqihar	齐齐哈尔	齊齊哈爾	Dongbei	1949 abolished → Heilongjiang
Ningxia	宁夏	寧夏	Níngxià	宁 níng	Yinchuan	银川	銀川	Xibei	1954 province → Gansu
Mudanjiang	牡丹江	牡丹江	Mǔdānjiāng	丹 dān	Mudanjiang	牡丹江	牡丹江	Dongbei	1949 abolished → Heilongjiang
Pingyuan	平原	平原	Píngyuán	平 píng	Xinxiang	新乡	新鄉	Zhongnan	1952 abolished → Henan, Shandong
Qinghai	青海	青海	Qīnghǎi	青 qīng	Xining	西宁	西寧	Xibei	
Rehe	热河	热河	Rèhé	热 rè	Chengde	承德	承德	Dongbei	1955 abolished → Inner Mongolia, & Liaoning
Sichuan	四川	四川	Sìchuān	川 chuān	Chengdu	成都	成都	Xinan	1949 abolished → Chuanbei, Chuandong, Chuannan, Chuanxi; 1952 reverted 1997 Chongqing split into its own municipality
Shaanxi	陕西	陕西	Shǎnxī	陕 shǎn	Xi'an	西安	西安	Xibei	
Shandong	山东	山東	Shāndōng	鲁 lǔ	Jinan	济南	濟南	Huadong	
Shanxi	山西	山西	Shānxī	晋 jìn	Taiyuan	太原	太原	Huabei	
Songjiang	松江	松江	Sōngjiāng	松 sōng	Harbin	哈尔滨	哈爾濱	Dongbei	1954 abolished → Heilongjiang
Suiyuan	绥远	綏遠	Suíyuǎn	绥 suí	Hohhot	呼和浩特	呼和浩特	Huabei	1954 abolished → Inner Mongolia
Taiwan	台湾	臺灣	Táiwān	台 tái	Taipei	台北	臺北	Huadong	claimed since 1949 the founding of the PRC; it has not been governed by the PRC since its founding
Xikang	西康	西康	Xīkāng	康 kāng	Kangding (49–50); Ya'an (50–55)	康定 雅安	康定 雅安	Xinan	1955 abolished → Sichuan & Qamdo
Xing'an	兴安	興安	Xīkāng	兴 xīng	Hulunbuir	呼伦贝尔	呼倫貝爾	Dongbei	1949 abolished → Heilongjiang
Xinjiang	新疆	新疆	Xīnjiāng	疆 jiāng	Ürümqi	乌鲁木齐	烏魯木齊	Xibei	1955 province → autonomous region
Yunnan	云南	雲南	Yúnnán	滇 diān	Kunming	昆明	昆明	Xinan	
Zhejiang	浙江	浙江	Zhèjiāng	浙 zhè	Hangzhou	杭州	杭州	Huadong	
Autonomous Regions
Alxa Khoshut Banner → Alxa	阿拉善和硕特旗→阿拉善	阿拉善和碩特旗→阿拉善	Ālāshàn	阿 ā	Bayanhot	巴彥浩特	巴彥浩特	Huabei	1954 merge into Inner Mongolia
Ejin	额济纳	額濟納	Éjìnà	额 é	Dalainhob	达拉呼布	達拉呼布	Huabei	1954 merge into Inner Mongolia
Guangxi	广西	廣西	Guǎngxī	桂 guì	Nanning	南宁	南寧	Zhongnan	1958 province → autonomous region
Inner Mongolia	内蒙古	內蒙古	Nèi Měnggǔ	蒙 měng	Ulaanhot (47–50); Hohhot (present)	乌兰浩特 呼和浩特	烏蘭浩特 呼和浩特	Huabei	1947 created; 1969 truncated → Liaoning, Heilongjiang, Jilin, Gansu, Ningxia; 1979 reverted
Ningxia	宁夏	寧夏	Níngxià	宁 níng	Yinchuan	银川	銀川	Xibei	1958 special region → autonomous region
Tibet	西藏	西藏	Xīzàng	藏 zàng	Lhasa	拉萨	拉薩	Xinan	1965 region → autonomous region
Xinjiang	新疆	新疆	Xīnjiāng	疆 jiāng	Ürümqi	乌鲁木齐	烏魯木齊	Xibei	1955 province → autonomous region
Municipalities
Anshan	鞍山	鞍山	Ānshān	鞍 ān	Tiedong District	铁东区	鐵東區	Dongbei	1954 abolished → Liaoning
Beijing	北京	北京	Běijīng	京 jīng	Dongcheng District	东城区	東城區	Huabei	
Benxi	本溪	本溪	Běnxī	本 běn	Pingshan District	平山区	平山區	Dongbei	1954 abolished → Liaoning
Changchun	长春	長春	Chángchūn	春 chūn	Nanguan District	南关区	南關區	Dongbei	1953 created; 1954 abolished → Jilin
Chongqing	重庆	重慶	Chóngqìng	渝 yú	Yuzhong District	渝中区	渝中區	Xinan	1954 abolished → Sichuan; 1997 reverted
Dalian → Lüda	大连→旅大	大連→旅大	Dàlián	连 lián	Xigang District	西岗区	西崗區	Dongbei	1949 abolished → Luda, 1950 reverted, 1954 abolished → Liaoning
Fushun	抚顺	撫順	Fǔshùn	抚 fǔ	Shuncheng District	顺城区	順城區	Dongbei	1954 abolished → Liaoning
Harbin	哈尔滨	哈爾濱	Hārbīn	哈 hā	Nangang District	南岗区	南崗區	Dongbei	1953 created, 1954 abolished → Heilongjiang
Guangzhou	广州	廣州	Guǎngzhōu	穗 suì	Yuexiu District	越秀区	越秀區	Zhongnan	1954 abolished → Guangdong
Nanjing	南京	南京	Nánjīng	宁 níng	Xuanwu District	宣武区	宣武區	Huadong	1952 abolished → Jiangsu
Shanghai	上海	上海	Shànghǎi	沪 hù	Huangpu District	黄浦区	黃浦區	Huadong	
Shenyang	沈阳	瀋陽	Shěnyáng	沈 shěn	Shenhe District	沈河区	瀋河區	Dongbei	1954 abolished → Liaoning
Tianjin	天津	天津	Tiānjīn	津 jīn	Heping District	和平区	和平區	Huabei	1954 abolished → Hebei, 1967 reverted
Hankou → Wuhan	汉口→武汉	漢口→武漢	Wǔhàn	汉 hàn	Jiang'an District	江岸区	江岸區	Zhongnan	1949 abolished → Hubei
Xi'an	西安	西安	Xī'ān	镐 hào	Weiyang District	未央区	未央區	Xibei	1954 abolished → Shaanxi
Special Administrative Regions
Hainan	海南	海南	Hǎinán	琼 qióng	Haikou	海口	海口	Zhongnan	1949 abolished → Guangdong
Hong Kong	香港	香港	Xiānggǎng	港 gǎng	Hong Kong	香港	香港	Zhongnan	1997 created (Transfer of sovereignty over Hong Kong)
Macau	澳门	澳門	Àomén	澳 ào	Macau	澳门	澳門	Zhongnan	1999 created (Transfer of sovereignty over Macau)
Administrative Territories
Chuanbei	川北	川北	Chuānběi	充 chōng	Nanchong	南充	南充	Xinan	1950 created; 1952 abolished → Sichuan
Chuandong	川东	川東	Chuāndōng	渝 yú	Chongqing	重庆	重慶	Xinan	1950 created; 1952 abolished → Sichuan
Chuannan	川南	川南	Chuānnán	泸 lú	Luzhou	泸州	瀘州	Xinan	1950 created; 1952 abolished → Sichuan
Chuanxi	川西	川西	Chuānxī	蓉 róng	Chengdu	成都	成都	Xinan	1950 created; 1952 abolished → Sichuan
Subei	苏北	蘇北	Sūběi	扬 yáng	Yangzhou	扬州	揚州	Huadong	1949 created; 1952 abolished → Jiangsu
Sunan	苏南	蘇南	Sūnán	锡 xī	Wuxi	无锡	無錫	Huadong	1949 created; 1952 abolished → Jiangsu
Wanbei	皖北	皖北	Wǎnběi	合 hé	Hefei	合肥	合肥	Huadong	1949 created; 1952 abolished → Anhui
Wannan	皖南	皖南	Wǎnnán	芜 wú	Wuhu	芜湖	蕪湖	Huadong	1949 created; 1952 abolished → Anhui
Lüda	旅大	旅大	Lǚdà	旅 Lǚ	Dalian	大连	大連	Dongbei	1949 created; 1950 abolished → Dalian
Regions
Tibet	西藏	西藏	Xīzàng	藏 zàng	Lhasa	拉萨	拉薩	Xinan	1965 region → autonomous region
Territories
Qamdo	昌都	昌都	Chāngdū	昌 chāng	Qamdo	昌都	昌都	Xinan	1965 merge into Tibet

Provincial-level administrative divisions and capitals of China
Legend: Capital Direct-administered municipality East South West North Central Special Administrative Region (SAR)

== See also ==
- Administrative divisions of China
