= Administrative divisions of China (disambiguation) =

Administrative divisions of China are the political divisions of the People's Republic of China.

Administrative divisions of China may also refer to:

- Administrative divisions of Taiwan, officially the Republic of China
- History of the administrative divisions of China before 1912
- History of the administrative divisions of China (1912–1949)
- History of the administrative divisions of China (1949–present)
- Administrative divisions of the Special Administrative Regions of China
  - Districts of Hong Kong
  - Municipal Affairs Bureau (Macau)
