= Liaodong (disambiguation) =

Liaodong Peninsula is a peninsula in Liaoning, China.

Liaodong may also refer to:

== Places in Liaoning, China ==
- Liaodong Bay, bay of the Bohai Sea
- Andong Province, former province of China (1934–1954), renamed Liaodong Province in 1949
- Liaodong Commandery, commandery in imperial China
- Liaoyang, historically also known as Liaodong
