= Lingsheng =

Chinese Pan-Mongol politician (1886–1936)

- 凌陞
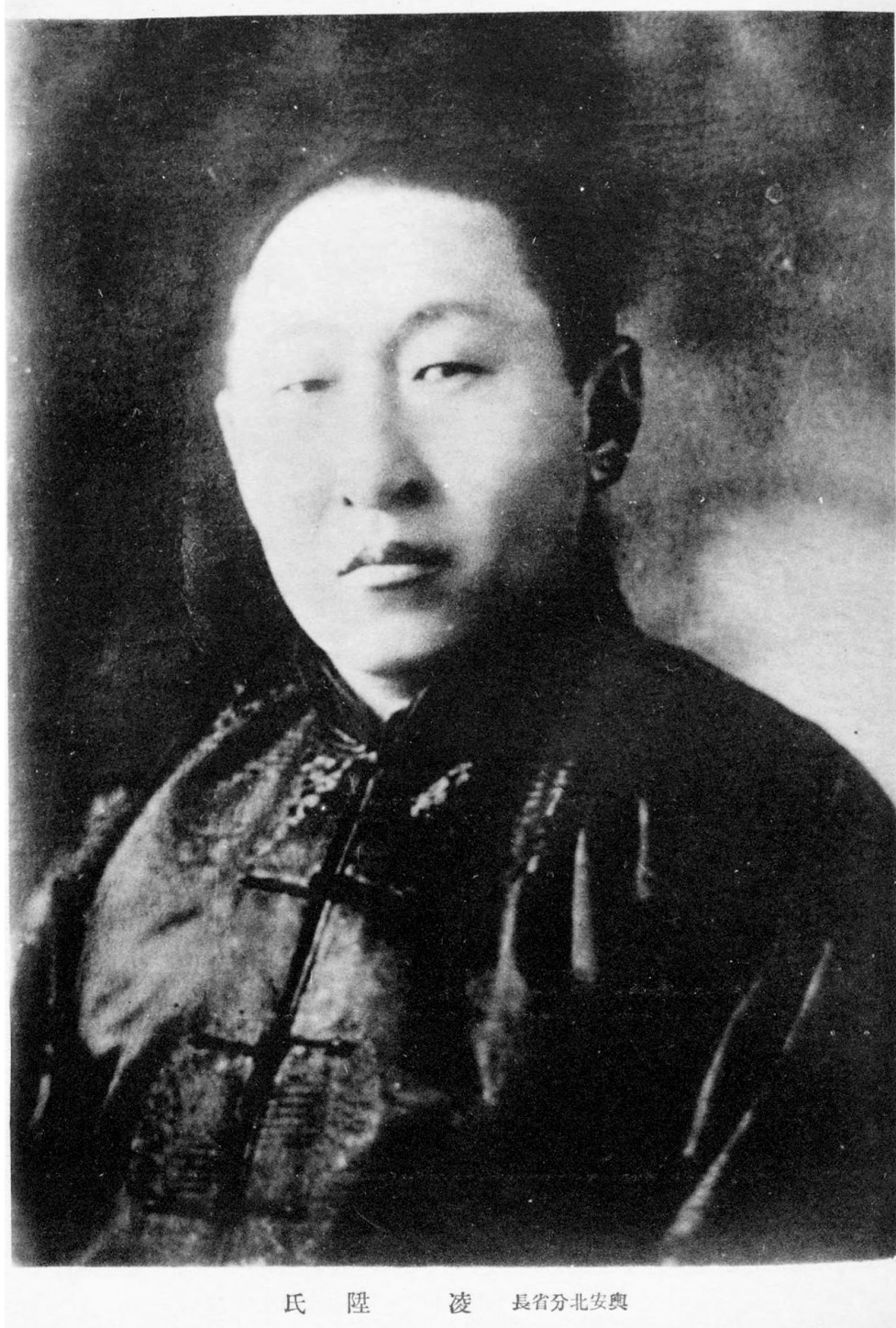
- Lingsheng in 1934

Governor of Xing'an Province
- In office October 1934 – April 24, 1936

Member of the Legislative Yuan
- In office October 12, 1931 – May 4, 1932

Personal details
- Born: 1886 Qing Dynasty
- Died: April 24, 1936 (aged 51) Changchun, Manchukuo
- Party: Concordia Association

Moerding Lingsheng (莫尔丁凌陞, 1886 - April 24, 1936) often known by his courtesy name, Yunzhi, was a Chinese Pan-Mongol politician who served as a Legislative Yuan of the Republic of China for a short period between 1931 and 1932 and as Governor of Xing'an Province in Manchukuo from 1932 until his execution by the Kwantung Army.

== Biography ==
He was born in 1886 with Daur and Solon ancestry in the Qing Dynasty. His father was Guifu, the deputy governor of Hulunbuir. Yunzhi grew up speaking Manchu, but learnt Chinese while attending Hulunbuir Mengqi Middle School.

In October 1931, he was elected to the Legislative Yuan of the Republic of China. After the establishment of Manchukuo, he served as the governor of Xing'an Province. Lingsheng was an outspoken pan-Mongolist who collaborated with the Japanese Government, stating that "the ultimate goal of the Mongolians is to unify Outer Mongolia, Inner Mongolia and Hulunbuir into one country. Under the current situation, they can only rely on Japan to achieve this goal."

In 1935, at the Manchuria Conference to discuss the border issue between Manchukuo and the Mongolian People's Republic, he served as the chief representative of Manchukuo's delegation. According to a later court martial ruling, this Manchuria Conference was the catalyst for him to make contact with Mongolian dignitaries, and he began to communicate military secrets between the Manchukuo and Japanese armies. He also secretly received weapons from the Mongolian side. According to Katsuhiko Tanaka, research published in Mongolia supported this.

In 1936, he was arrested by the Kwantung Army alongside many prominent supporters of Emperor Puyi. On April 20 of the same year, the Kwantung Army Military Court sentenced Lingsheng and other seven people to death on charges of "collaborating with the Soviet Union, collaborating with the Mongols, and opposing the Manchus and Japan". They were later executed. This incident is known as the "Lingsheng Incident".

Puyi had betrothed his fourth sister, Yunxian, to Lingsheng's son, Sebu Jingtai, but after Lingsheng's death, Puyi annulled the marriage under pressure from Japan.
