= Ma Jianzhang =

Chinese zoologist (1937–2022)

- 马建章
- Born: 20 July 1937; Fuxin County, Jinzhou Province, Manchukuo
- Died: 23 December 2022 (aged 85); Harbin, Heilongjiang, China
- Education: Northeast Forestry University; Harbin Normal University
- Scientific career
- Fields: Wildlife science
- Workplaces: Northeast Forestry University

Chinese name
- Simplified Chinese: 马建章
- Traditional Chinese: 馬建章
Transcriptions
Standard Mandarin
- Hanyu Pinyin: Mǎ Jiànzhāng

Ma Jianzhang (Chinese: 马建章; 20 July 1937 – 23 December 2022) was a Chinese zoologist, and an academician of the Chinese Academy of Engineering.

== Biography ==
Ma was born in Fuxin County (now Fuxin), Jinzhou Province, Manchukuo, on 20 July 1937, but grew up in Tongliao, Inner Mongolia. In 1956, he entered Northeast Forestry University, where he majored in forestry. In 1961, he was admitted to Harbin Normal University, where he studied vertebrate taxonomy and ecology under Zhang Mengwen.

After graduating in 1962, Ma returned to and taught at Northeast Forestry University. In 1970, he was sent to the May Seventh Cadre Schools to do farm works in Yilan County, Heilongjiang. In 1973, he was appointed deputy director of the Department of Forestry, Northeast Forestry University, rising to director in 1980. In 1992, he was proposed as the founding dean of the College of Wildlife Resources, and served until 1999.

On 23 December 2022, Ma died in Harbin, Heilongjiang, at the age of 85.

== Honours and awards ==
- 1988 State Science and Technology Progress Award (Second Class)
- 1995 Member of the Chinese Academy of Engineering (CAE)
