= Jusaburō Tsujimura =

Japanese puppeteer (1933–2023)

- 辻村寿三郎
- Born: 1 November 1933; Chaoyang, Jinzhou Province, Manchukuo, Japan
- Died: 5 February 2023 (aged 89)
- Known for: Puppetry, doll making, art direction
- Website: mhst.jp/jusaburo/jyusaburo_miyoshi.htm

Jusaburō Tsujimura (辻村寿三郎) (1 November 1933 – 5 February 2023) was a Japanese puppeteer, puppet and doll maker, and art director.

== Early life ==
Tsujimura was born on 1 November 1933 in Chaoyang, Jinzhou Province, Manchukuo, where he spent his early childhood. He moved to Japan in 1944, and lived in Hiroshima for almost a year, leaving just before the nuclear bomb was dropped on the city to move to Miyoshi, Hiroshima – his mother's hometown and the site of what is now his museum. At 22, his mother died, which spurred his move back to Tokyo. He began his career in Ningyōza puppet troupes, and making stage props for the kabuki theatre with the Fujinami Company. He eventually left this job in 1959, resolved to create dolls full time.

== Career ==
At 22, his mother died, which spurred his move back to Tokyo. He began his career in Ningyōza puppet troupes, and making stage props for the kabuki theatre with the Fujinami Company. He eventually left this job in 1959, resolved to create dolls full time. He created 300 puppets for a television serial drama, The Story of the Eight Dogs, starting in 1973 – bringing him fame and attention. From here he began to create his own original dolls and puppets. He became known to audiences in the west after his success as the art director and costume designer for Yukio Ninagawa's productions of both Medea and Macbeth.

Mae Smethurst's review of Medea provides formal analyses of Tsujimura's costumes that acknowledge his visual references to kabuki theatre:

[Tsujimura] took fifty antique brocade obis, cut them up, sewed them together again, and used them not to bind but to create the magnificent outer robe, under which a second layer of the costume is visible, which exposes the large (artificial) breasts attached to it. Medea's large headdress reproduces the size and evokes the general shape of the headdresses of some women's roles in kabuki (especially those of geisha), including long ribbons hanging down over each shoulder. But the headdress created by Tsujimura has dangling sequins and decorations, including what looks like ram's horns and a baby doll's face, replacing the usual hair ornaments which normally include such items as cherry blossoms and combs placed in black hair elaborately coiffed into a large wig.

In his costumes for Macbeth, Tsujimura designed color-coded period costumes. For instance, in the banquet scene, Macbeth and Lady Macbeth bond through love and guilt, and wear matching red and green robes with identical hairstyling.

Though he primarily made dolls and puppets, he has also made daruma wood carvings and other small toys and figurines from wood.

== Death ==
Tsujimura died of heart failure on 5 February 2023, at the age of 89.

== Exhibitions ==
In 1992 he had a solo retrospective that toured Japan and traveled internationally to be shown at the New York Public Library. In 2014 he had a solo exhibition of his work at the Sano Art Museum.

== Legacy ==
=== Jusaburō Tsujimura Doll Museum ===
The Jusaburō Tsujimura Doll Museum is in Miyoshi, Hiroshima. In 1951, the building changed from a bank to a post office. In 1981 it became the Miyoshi City History and Folklore museum. In 2013, it became the Jusaburō Tsujimura Doll Museum, although its second floor remains dedicated to the folklore of Miyoshi.

=== Publications ===
A 152 page monograph of his work was published by Asahi Shinbunsha in 1992.
