= List of administrative divisions of Greater China by Human Development Index =

This is a list of the first-level administrative divisions of the People's Republic of China (PRC), including all provinces, autonomous regions, municipalities, and special administrative regions in order of their Human Development Index (HDI), along with the Republic of China (ROC, Taiwan). The subnational and national average figures for the PRC/ROC division are mainly derived from the Subnational Human Development Index (SHDI), published by the Global Data Lab at Radboud University. The index does not cover Macau, a special administrative region of the PRC. Only divisions of Mainland China are given ranking numbers in the list as the national HDI for China, which is calculated by the annual UNDP Human Development Report, is exclusively applied to the mainland.

== List of administrative divisions by HDI ==
Administrative divisions of mainland China and Taiwan by Human Development Index (2023). Very high (≥ 0.800) High (0.700 – 0.799) Medium (0.600 – 0.699)

=== The Subnational Human Development Database (2023 data) ===
Rank	Provincial-level division / National average	HDI (2023)
Very high human development
–	Hong Kong (Note: Hong Kong and Macau are special administrative regions of the People's Republic of China.)	0.955
–	Republic of China (Taiwan) (Note: Taiwan is under separate rule by the Republic of China as a de facto independent state since 1950, but is claimed by the People's Republic of China as a province. The ROC also claims the mainland as its constitutional-defined territory.)	0.934 (Note: The HDI annual report compiled by the UNDP does not include Taiwan because it is no longer a UN member state, and is neither included as part of the People's Republic of China by both of the UNDP and SHDI reports when calculating data for China. Taiwan's Statistical Bureau calculated its HDI for 2023 to be 0.934 based on UNDP's 2014 methodology, which would place Taiwan at 21st globally in 2023 within the 2025 UNDP report.)
–	Macau	0.934 (Note: Macao's HDI is not included in the SHDI database or any UNDP annual report. According to the 2025 annual report published by the Statistics and Census Service of the Government of Macao Special Administrative Region, the HDI for Macau was predicted at 0.934 in 2023.)
1	Beijing	0.912
2	Shanghai	0.901
3	Tianjin	0.867
4	Jiangsu	0.836
5	Zhejiang	0.823
5	Guangdong	0.823
7	Fujian	0.812
8	Inner Mongolia	0.807
9	Chongqing	0.804
10	Liaoning	0.803
10	Hubei	0.803
12	Shaanxi	0.802
13	Shanxi	0.800
High human development
14	Shandong	0.798
–	People's Republic of China (Average) (Note: Figures refer to mainland China only.)	0.797
15	Hainan	0.790
15	Hunan	0.790
17	Jilin	0.787
18	Heilongjiang	0.778
19	Jiangxi	0.777
20	Anhui	0.776
21	Ningxia	0.773
22	Xinjiang	0.771
22	Sichuan	0.771
22	Hebei	0.771
25	Henan	0.769
26	Guangxi	0.760
27	Yunnan	0.737
28	Guizhou	0.734
29	Gansu	0.731
30	Qinghai	0.727
Medium human development
31	Tibet	0.656

== Trend ==
Legend

Very High human development

0.900 and above
0.850–0.899
0.800–0.849

High human development

0.750–0.799
0.700–0.749

Medium human development

0.650–0.699
0.600–0.649
0.550–0.599

Data unavailable

2010-2014 HDI

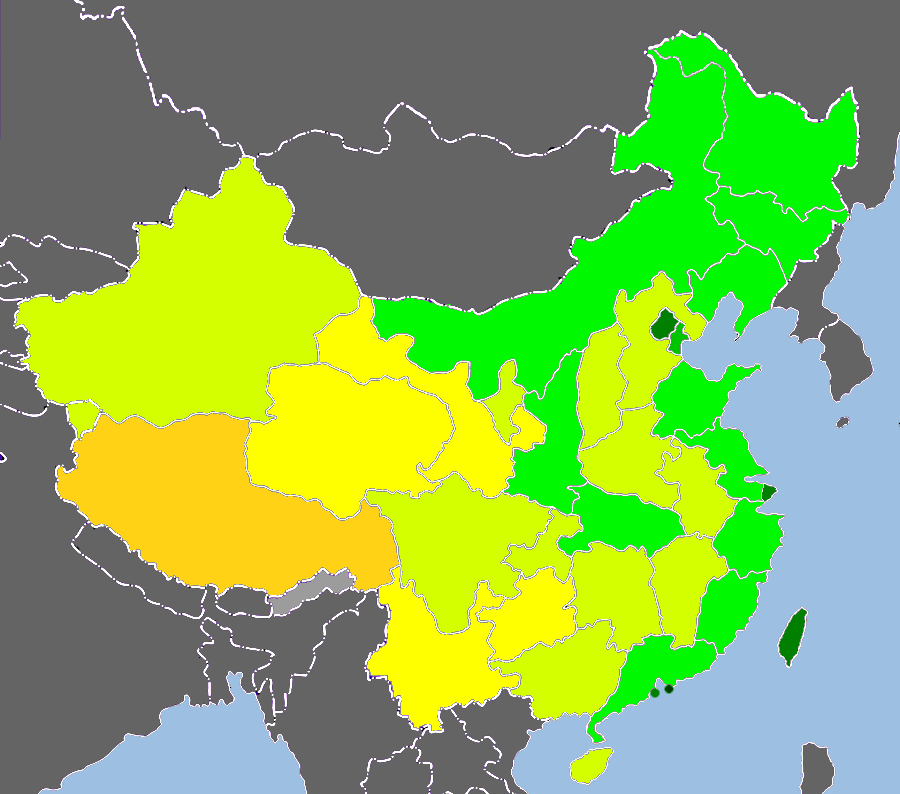
2014 data

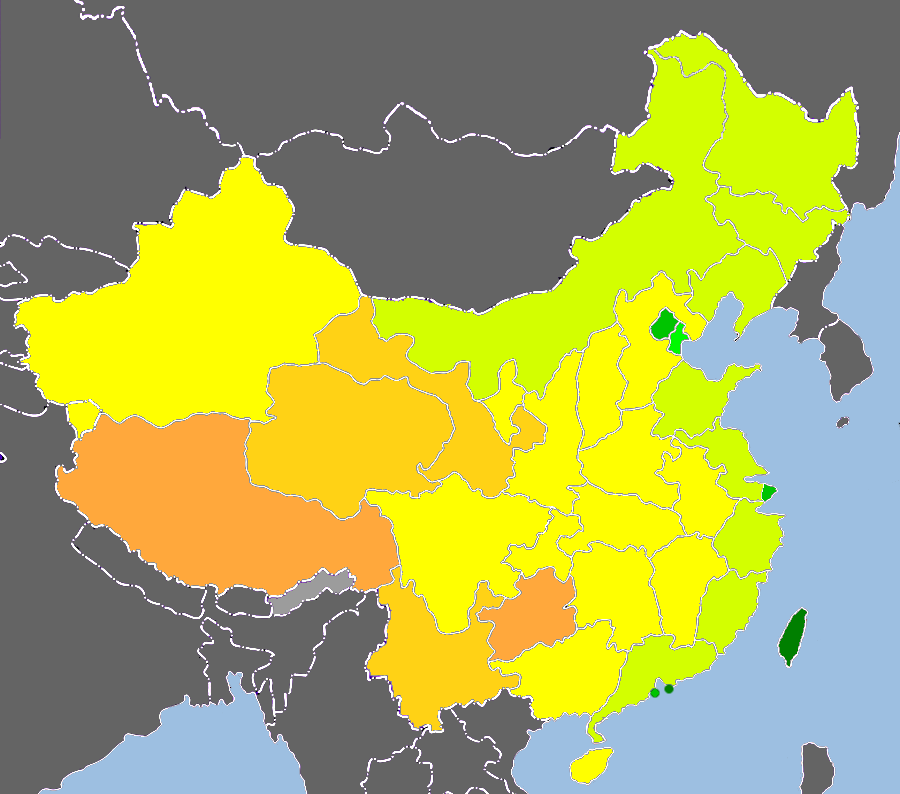
2010 data

Legend

Very High human development

0.900–0.949

High human development

0.850–0.899
0.800–0.849

Medium human development

0.750–0.799
0.700–0.749
0.650–0.699
0.600–0.649
0.550–0.599
0.500–0.549

Low human development

0.450–0.499
0.400–0.449
0.350–0.399
Data unavailable

1982-2008 HDI

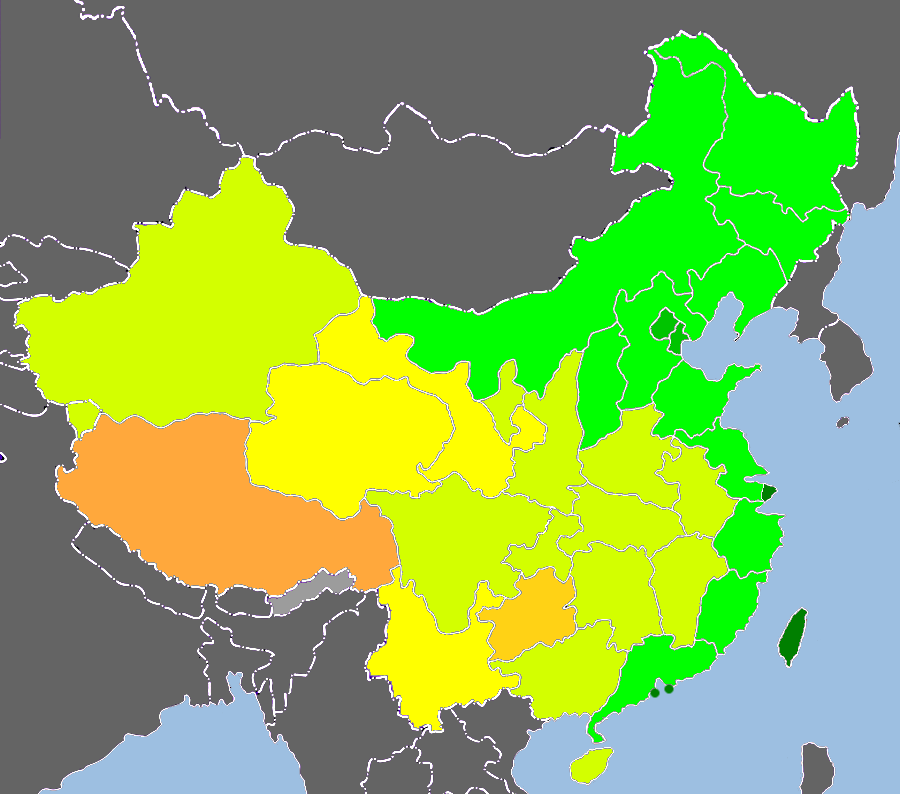
2008 data

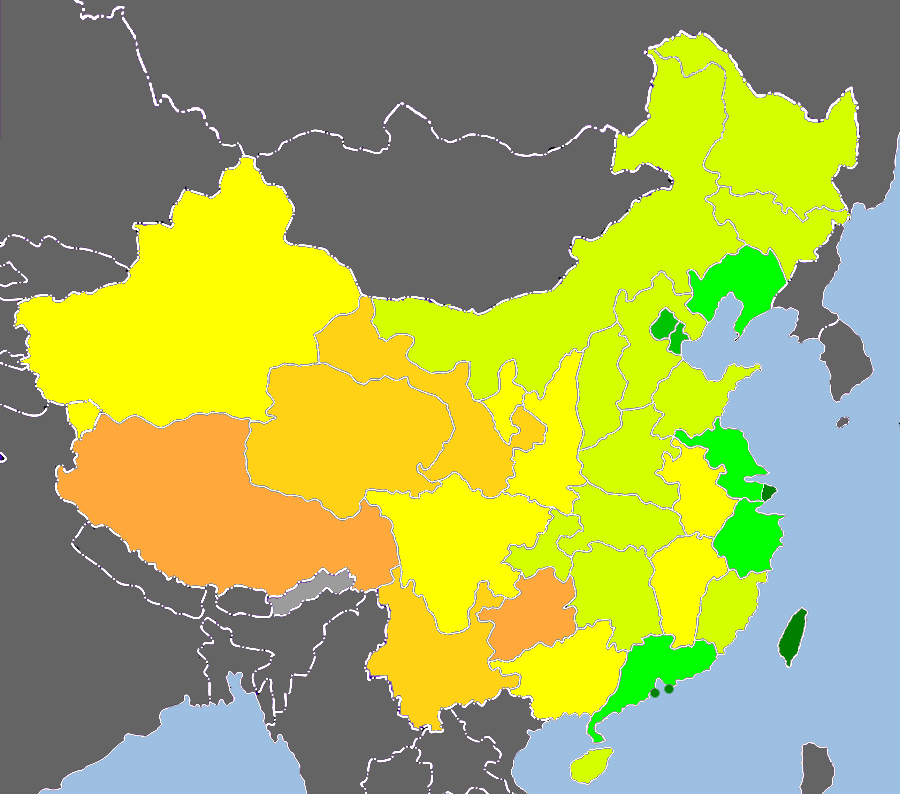
2005 data

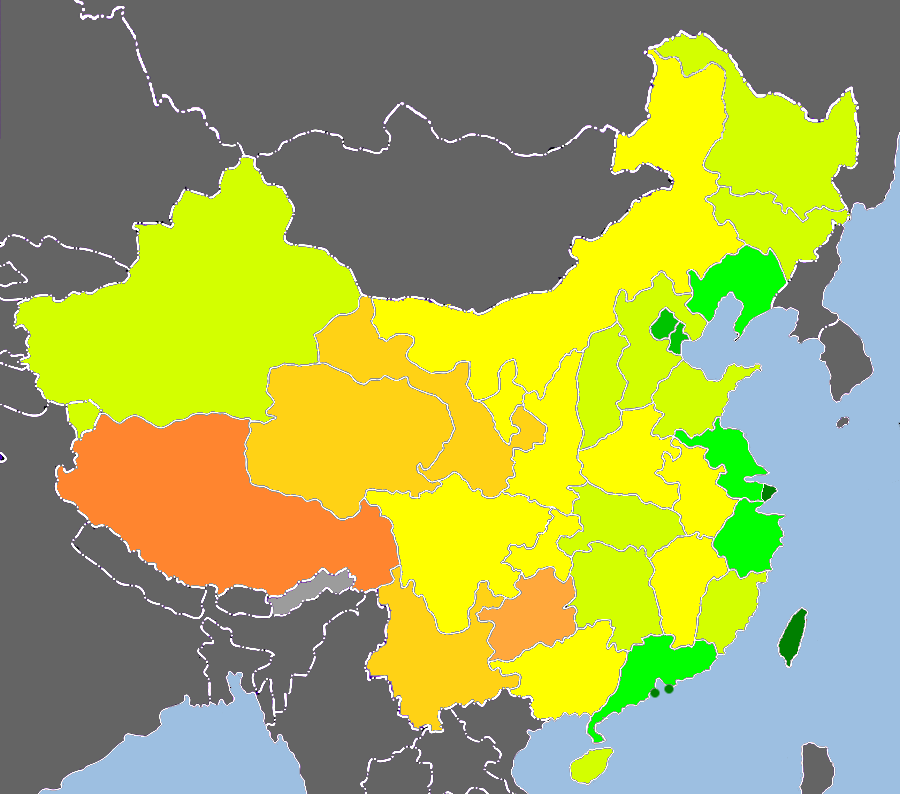
2003 data

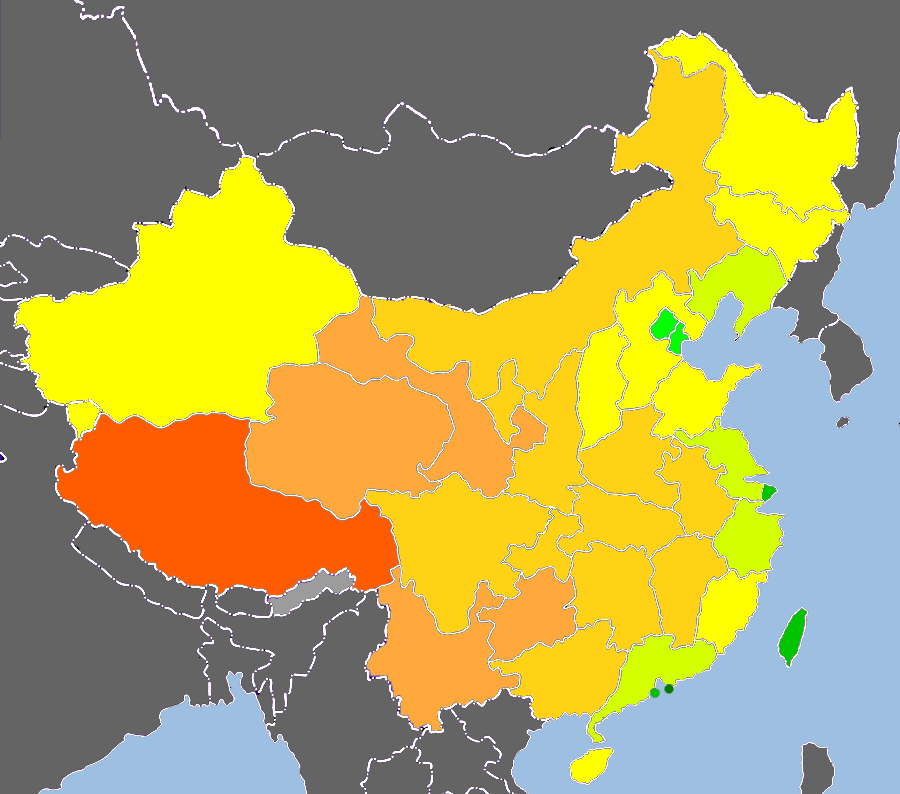
1999 data

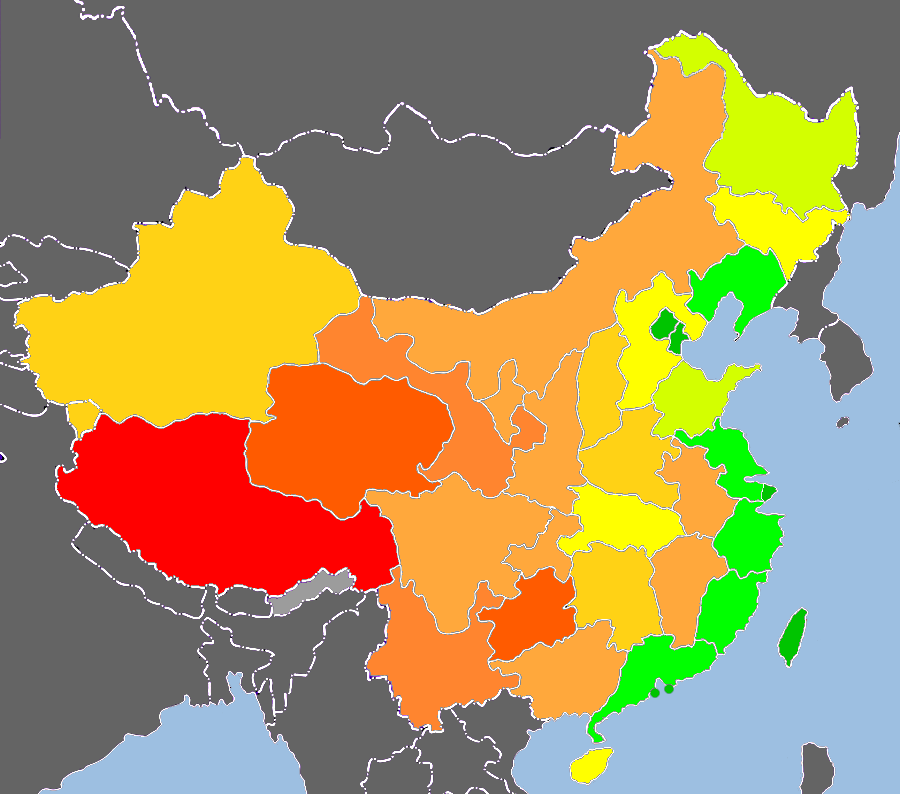
1997 data

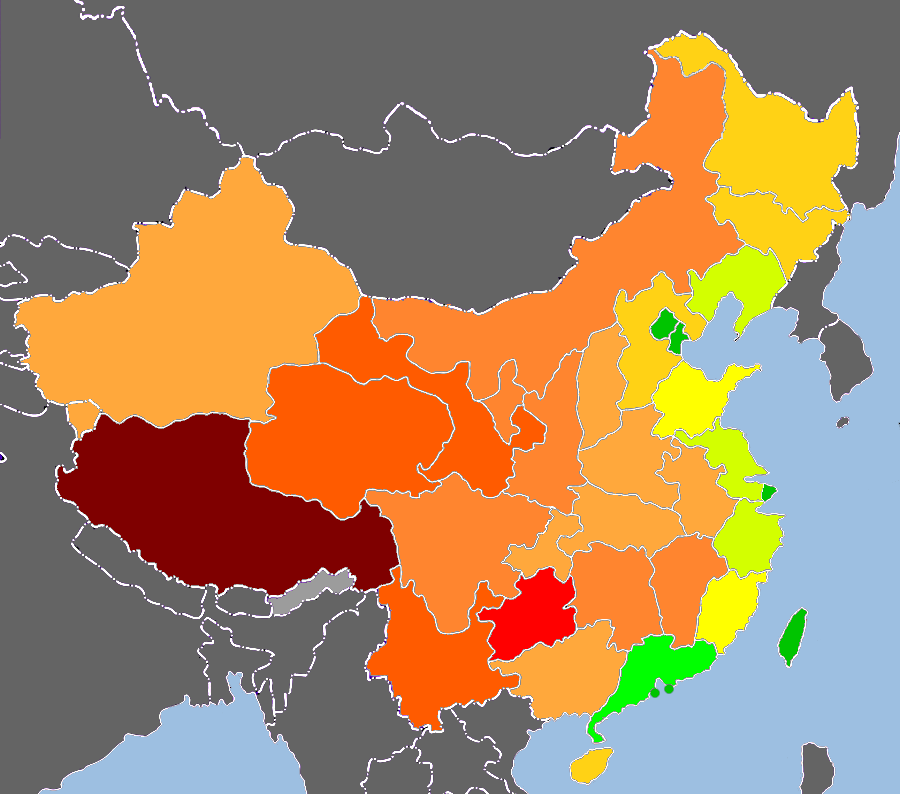
1995 data

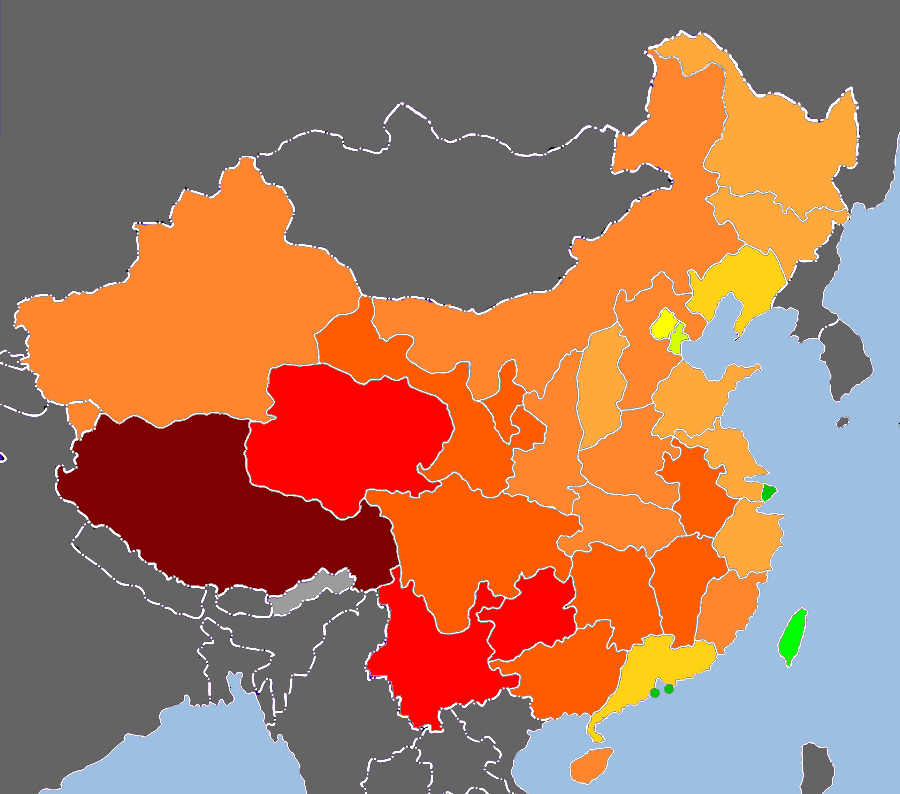
1990 data

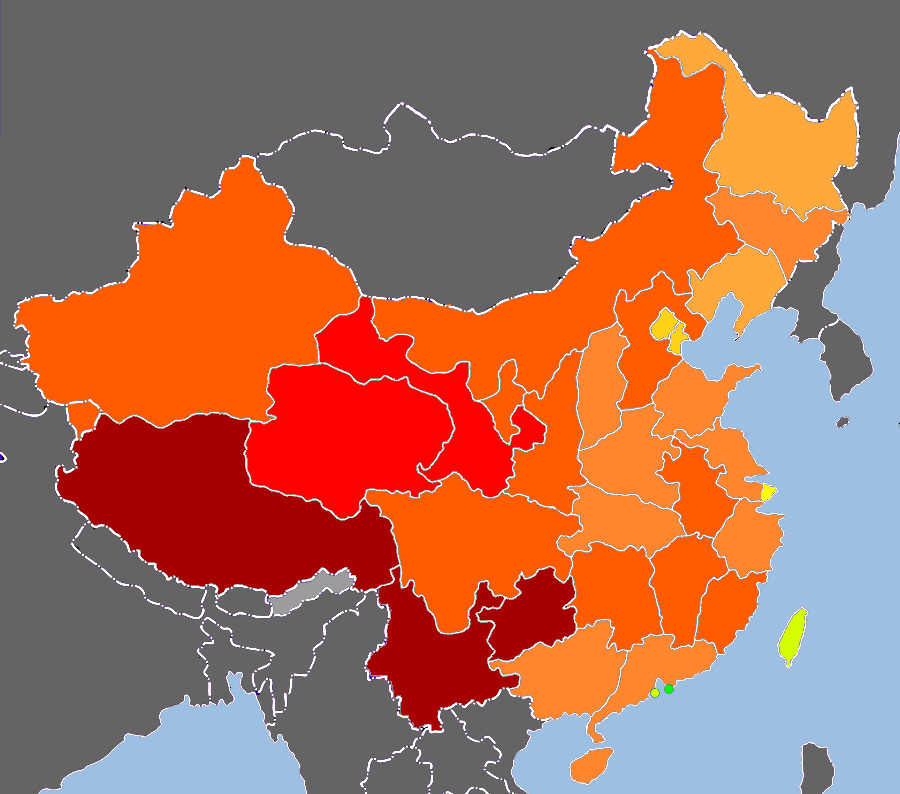
1982 data

== See also ==
- List of countries by Human Development Index
