= Autonomous regions of China =

Autonomous regions 自治区 Zìzhìqū
- Category: Unitary state
- Location: China
- Number: 5 (Guangxi, Inner Mongolia, Ningxia, Tibet, and Xinjiang)
- Populations: 110,879,058 (Note: Guangxi – 50,126,804 Inner Mongolia – 24,049,155 Ningxia – 7,202,654 Xinjiang – 25,852,345 Tibet – 3,648,100)
- Areas: 4,380,000 km^{2} (1,690,000 sq mi) (Note: Guangxi – 237,600 km^{2} (91,700 sq mi) Inner Mongolia – 1,183,000 km^{2} (457,000 sq mi) Ningxia – 66,400 km^{2} (25,600 sq mi) Xinjiang – 1,665,000 km^{2} (643,000 sq mi) Tibet – 1,228,000 km^{2} (474,000 sq mi))
- Government: Regional People's Government, Central People's Government
- Subdivisions: Prefecture-level city, prefecture, league, sub-provincial autonomous prefecture, autonomous prefecture

In the People's Republic of China, an autonomous region (Chinese: 自治区; pinyin: Zìzhìqū; lit. 'self-governing region') is a provincial-level administrative division and province equivalent. An autonomous region has its own local government, but under the law of the People's Republic of China, an autonomous region has more legislative rights, such as the right to "formulate self-government regulations and other separate regulations." An autonomous region is the highest level of minority autonomous entity in China, which has a comparably higher population of a particular minority ethnic group.

There are five autonomous regions in China: Guangxi, Inner Mongolia (Nei Menggu), Ningxia, Tibet (Xizang), and Xinjiang.

== History ==
Established in 1947, the Inner Mongolia Autonomous Region became the first autonomous region in the Chinese liberated zone. Xinjiang was made autonomous in 1955 after the PRC's founding, and Guangxi and Ningxia were made autonomous in 1958. Tibet was annexed by the People's Republic of China in 1951, and was declared an autonomous region in 1965. The designation of Guangxi and Ningxia as Zhuang and Hui autonomous areas, respectively, was protested by the local Han Chinese, who made up two-thirds of the population of each region. Although Mongols made up an even smaller percentage of Inner Mongolia than either of these, the ensuing Chinese Civil War gave little opportunity for protest.

== Legal rights ==
Autonomous regions in China have no legal right to secede, unlike in the Soviet Union – the Law of the People's Republic of China on Regional Ethnic Autonomy, written in 1984, states that "each and every ethnic autonomous region is an inseparable part of the People's Republic of China," and that "any form of ... separatism ... is absolutely prohibited."

== Public goods and services ==
In general, China's minority regions have some of the highest per capita government spending on education, among other public goods and services. Providing public goods and services in these areas is part of a government effort to reduce regional inequalities, reduce the risk of separatism, and stimulate economic development.

== List of autonomous regions ==
Name in English	Map	Simplified Chinese Pinyin	Abbreviation	Local name SASM/GNC romanization (Language)	Capital	Designated minority	Language	Pre-1949 ROC subdivision
Inner Mongolia Autonomous Region		内蒙古自治区; Nèi Měnggǔ Zìzhìqū	蒙 Měng (IMAR)	ᠦᠪᠦᠷ ᠮᠣᠩᠭᠤᠯ ᠤᠨ ᠥᠪᠡᠷᠲᠡᠭᠡᠨ ᠵᠠᠰᠠᠬᠣ ᠣᠷᠣᠨ; Öbür mongüol-un öbertegen zasaqu orun (Mongolian)	Hohhot (呼和浩特) ᠬᠥᠬᠡᠬᠣᠲᠠ	Mongol	Mongolian	Suiyuan, Chahar, Rehe, Liaobei, Xing'an, Gansu, and Ningxia
Guangxi Zhuang Autonomous Region		广西壮族自治区; Guǎngxī Zhuàngzú Zìzhìqū	桂 Guì (GZAR)	Gvangjsih Bouxcuengh Swcigih (Standard Zhuang/Zhuang)	Nanning (南宁; Nanzningz)	Zhuang	Zhuang, Standard Zhuang (Vahcuengh)	Guangxi (province)
Tibet Autonomous Region		西藏自治区; Xīzàng Zìzhìqū	藏 Zàng (TAR)	བོད་རང་སྐྱོང་ལྗོངས། Poi Ranggyong Jong (Standard Tibetan)	Lhasa (拉萨; ལྷ་ས།)	Tibetan	Standard Tibetan	Tibet Area, Xikang
Ningxia Hui Autonomous Region		宁夏回族自治区; Níngxià Huízú Zìzhìqū	宁 Níng (NHAR)	The Hui speak Chinese	Yinchuan (银川)	Hui	Dungan, Chinese	Ningxia (province)
Xinjiang Uygur Autonomous Region		新疆维吾尔自治区; Xīnjiāng Wéiwú'ěr Zìzhìqū	新 Xīn (XUAR)	شىنجاڭ ئۇيغۇر ئاپتونوم رايونى; Shinjang Uyghur Aptonom Rayoni (Uyghur)	Ürümqi (乌鲁木齐; ئۈرۈمچی)	Uyghur	Uyghur	Xinjiang (province)

== Statistics ==
=== Population ===
Administrative Division	National Share (%)	2020 Census	2010 Census	2000 Census	1990 Census	1982 Census	1964 Census	1954 Census
Guangxi	3.55	50,126,804	46,026,629	43,854,538	42,245,765	36,420,960	20,845,017	19,560,822
Inner Mongolia	1.70	24,049,155	24,706,321	23,323,347	21,456,798	19,274,279	12,348,638	6,100,104
Ningxia	0.51	7,202,654	6,176,900	5,486,393	4,655,451	3,895,578	*	*
Tibet Autonomous Region	0.26	3,648,100	3,002,166	2,616,329	2,196,010	1,892,393	1,251,225	1,273,969
Xinjiang	1.83	25,852,345	21,813,334	18,459,511	15,155,778	13,081,681	7,270,067	4,873,608
Total	7.85	110,879,058	101,725,350	93,740,118	85,709,802	74,561,891	41,714,947	31,808,503

=== Ethnic ===
Administrative Division	Titular Ethnic Group	Han Chinese	Other ethnic minorities
Xinjiang (Uyghur)	45.0%	42.2%	12.8%
Tibet (Tibetan)	86.0%	12.2%	1.8%
Inner Mongolia (Mongol)	17.7%	78.7%	3.6%
Ningxia (Hui)	35.0%	64.1%	0.9%
Guangxi (Zhuang)	31.4%	62.5%	6.1%

== See also ==
- Administrative divisions of China
  - Autonomous prefecture
  - Direct-administered municipalities of China
  - Provinces of China
  - Special administrative regions of China
- Autonomous administrative division
- Language Atlas of China
- Regional ethnic autonomy system of China
- Secession in China
- Standard Chinese
- Republics of Russia
