= Binjiang (Manchukuo province) =

Defunct province in East Asia

Coordinates: 30°12′N 120°12′E

Binjiang 濱江
- Province of Manchukuo
- 1934–1945
- Location of Binjiang in Manchukuo
- Capital: Harbin
- History
  - Established: 1 December 1934
  - Disestablished: 20 August 1945
- Today part of: China; Heilongjiang; Jilin

Binjiang (Chinese: 濱江) was one of the provinces of Manchukuo. On December 1, 1934, Binjiang was established after it was split from Jilin. In 1937, the province of Mundanjiang was split from Binjiang. On August 20, 1945, Binjiang was disestablished after the dissolution of Manchukuo in the Soviet–Japanese War.

Binjiang had a mix of Chinese, Korean, Japanese, and Russian people. Many Japanese settlers migrated to the area, during which many human rights abuses were committed.

== Administrative divisions ==
- Harbin City
- Acheng County
- Bin County
- Shuangcheng County
- Wuchang County
- Zhuhe County
- Weihe County
- Yanshou County
- Hulan County
- Bayan County
- Mulan County
- Zhaodong County
- Zhaozhou County
- Lanxi County
- Dongxing County
- Anda County
- Qinggang County
- Guoerluoshouqi

== Governors ==
- Lu Ronghuan : December 1, 1934 – May 21, 1935
- Han Yunjie : May 21, 1935 – May 25, 1935
- Yan Niansu : May 25, 1935 – July 1, 1937
- Shi Luben : July 1, 1937 – January 17, 1938
- Wei Huanzhang : February 10, 1938 – May 16, 1940
- Yu Jingtao : May 16, 1940 – April 20, 1943
- Wang Ziheng : April 20, 1943 – August 20, 1945

== See also ==
- List of administrative divisions of Manchukuo
