= Administrative divisions of the Republic of China (1912–1949) =

Administrative divisions of China between 1912 and 1949

The administrative divisions of China between 1912 and 1949 were established under the various Governments of the Republic of China before its evacuation to Taiwan.

== Introduction ==
The Republic of China was founded in 1912. It used most of the same administrative divisions as the Qing dynasty but divided Inner Mongolia into four provinces and set up several municipalities under the authority of the Executive Yuan. After the end of World War II in 1945, Manchuria was reincorporated into the Republic of China as nine provinces. Taiwan and the Penghu were also acquired by the Republic of China and organized into Taiwan Province after Retrocession Day. The Nationalist government of China officially recognized the independence of Outer Mongolia in January 1946 after the 1945 Mongolian independence referendum which voted for independence. Later, Hainan separated and became a first-level administrative region in January 1949. By this time the top-level divisions consisted of 35 provinces, 12 Yuan-controlled municipalities, one special administrative region and Tibet area.

After the central government's withdrawal from mainland China during the Chinese Civil War and subsequent relocation to Taiwan in 1949, the jurisdiction of the ROC was restricted to only Taiwan, the Penghus, Hainan, and a few offshore islands of Fujian and Zhejiang. Hainan was captured by the People's Republic of China in May 1950, followed by the unrecognized Tibet in 1951 and Zhejiang in 1955. The remaining area is called the "Free area of the Republic of China" in the ROC Constitution. In most ordinary legislation, the term "Taiwan Area" is used in place of the "Free Area", while mainland China is referred to as the "Mainland Area."

=== Provinces ===
After the Republic of China was established in 1912, it set up four more provinces in Inner Mongolia and two in historic Tibet, bringing the total to 28. In 1931, Ma Zhongying established Hexi in the northern parts of Gansu but the ROC never acknowledged the province. However, China lost four provinces with the establishment of the Japanese puppet state of Manchukuo in Manchuria. After the defeat of Japan in World War II in 1945, China re-incorporated Manchuria as 10 provinces, and assumed control of Taiwan as a province. As a result, the Republic of China in 1946 had 35 provinces.

- Andong (1947–1949)
- Anhui
- Fujian
- Gansu
- Guangdong
- Guangxi
- Guizhou
- Heilongjiang
- Zhili (renamed Hebei in 1928)
- Hejiang (1947–1949)
- Henan
- Hubei
- Hunan
- Jiangsu
- Jiangxi
- Jilin
- Liaobei (1947–1949)
- Fengtian (renamed Liaoning in 1929)
- Nenjiang (1947–1949)
- Ningxia (1928–1949)
- Qahar (1928–1949)
- Qinghai (1928–1949)
- Rehe (1928–1949)
- Shaanxi
- Shandong
- Shanxi
- Sichuan
- Songjiang (1947–1949)
- Suiyuan (1928–1949)
- Taiwan (after 1945)
- Xing'an (1947–1949)
- Xikang (1928–1949)
- Xinjiang (1928-1949)
- Yunnan
- Zhejiang (1928–1955)

==== Other provincial level divisions ====
- Chuanbian Special Administrative Region (1914–1935)
- Dongsheng Special Region (1923–1932)
- Hainan Special Administrative Region (1944–1949)
- Qahar Special Administrative Region (1914–1928)
- Rehe Special Administrative Region (1914–1928)
- Suiyuan Special Administrative Region (1914–1928)
- Weihai Special Administrative Region (1930–1945)
- Mongolia Area (1928–1946)
- Tibet Area (1928–1951)
- Beiping Yuan-controlled Municipality (1928–1949)
- Chongqing Yuan-controlled Municipality (1939–1949)
- Dalian Yuan-controlled Municipality (1945–1949)
- Guangzhou Yuan-controlled Municipality (1930, 1947–1949)
- Hankou Yuan-controlled Municipality (1927–1949)
- Harbin Yuan-controlled Municipality (1946–1949)
- Kaohsiung Special Municipality
- Nanjing Yuan-controlled Municipality (1927–1949)
- New Taipei Special Municipality
- Qingdao Yuan-controlled Municipality (1929–1949)
- Shanghai Yuan-controlled Municipality (1927–1949)
- Shenyang Yuan-controlled Municipality (1947–1949)
- Taichung Special Municipality
- Tainan Special Municipality
- Taipei Special Municipality
- Taoyuan Special Municipality
- Tianjin Yuan-controlled Municipality (1928–1949)
- Xi'an Yuan-controlled Municipality (1948–1949)

== Beiyang government (1912–1928) ==
Provinces and areas of the Republic of China in 1912

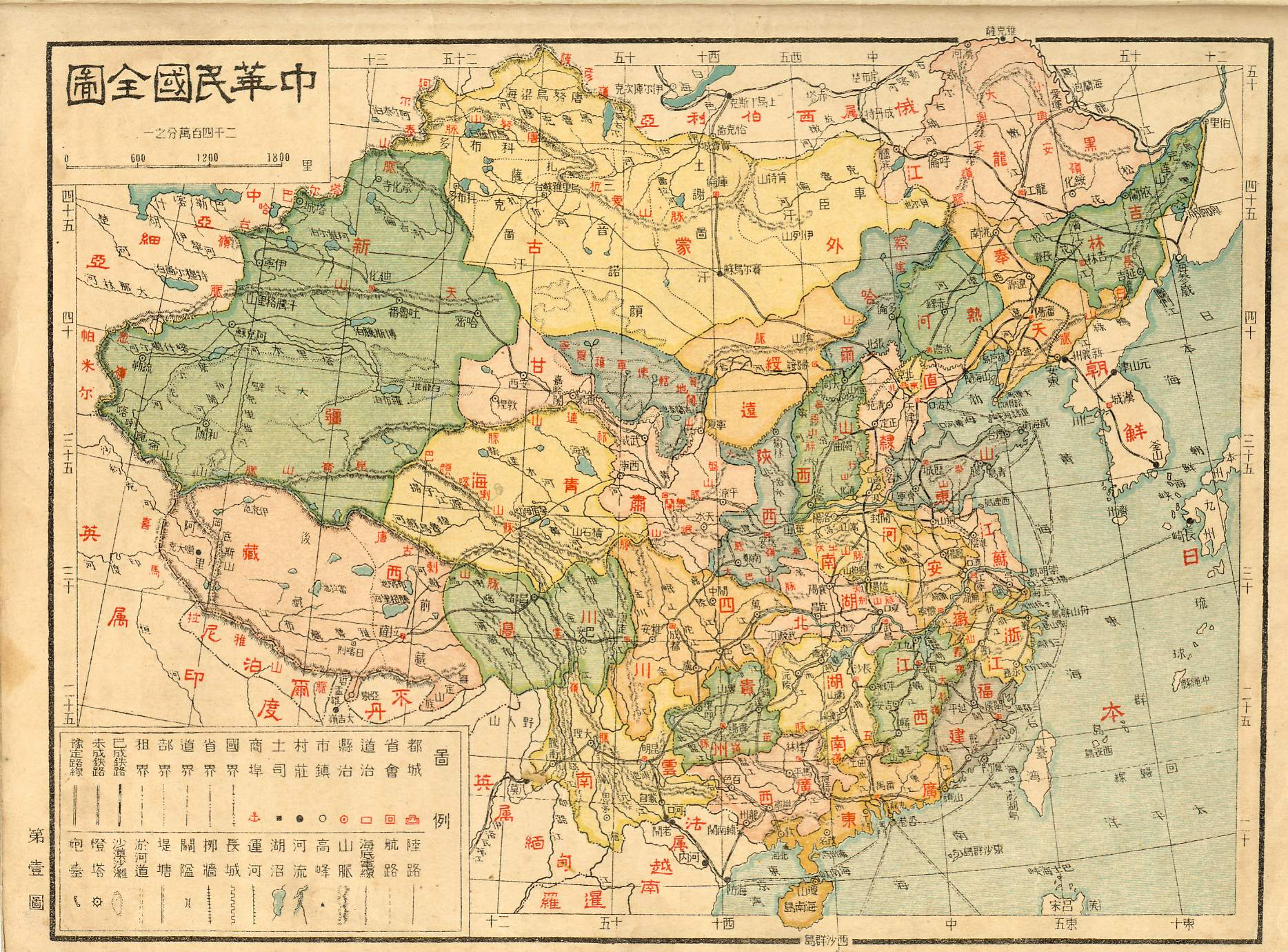
Map of the Republic of China in 1926

The Beiyang government streamlined the system used in Qing dynasty down to three levels:

- Provinces (省, shěng)
- Circuits (道, dào)
- Counties (縣, xiàn)

The Beiyang government set up four more provinces out of Inner Mongolia and the surrounding areas (Chahar, Rehe, Ningxia, Suiyuan) and two others out of parts of historical Tibet (Chuanbian (later Xikang) out of Kham and Qinghai out of Amdo; Ü-Tsang was the Dalai Lama's realm at this time and not part of any province), bringing the total number of provinces up to 28.

Administrative divisions of the Republic of China (1912–1928)
Division name			Abbreviation		Capital name			Note
Postal	Chinese	Pinyin	Chinese	Pinyin	Postal	Chinese	Pinyin	Note
Provinces (省 Shěng)
Anhwei	安徽	Ānhuī	皖	Wǎn	Anking	安慶	Ānqìng	
Chekiang	浙江	Zhèjiāng	浙	Zhè	Hangchow	杭州	Hángzhōu	
Chihli	直隸	Zhílì	直	Zhí	Tientsin	天津	Tiānjīn	1914 area around Peking (Beijing) split into Shuntien Prefecture
Fengtien	奉天	Fèngtiān	奉	Fèng	Mukden	瀋陽	Shěnyáng	
Fukien	福建	Fújiàn	閩	Mǐn	Foochow	福州	Fúzhōu	
Heilungkiang	黑龍江	Hēilóngjiāng	黑	Hēi	Tsitsihar	齊齊哈爾	Qíqíhār	1914 Hulunbuir Region split, 1920 merged back.
Honan	河南	Hénán	豫	Yù	Kaifeng	開封	Kāifēng	
Hunan	湖南	Húnán	湘	Xiāng	Changsha	長沙	Chángshā	
Hupeh	湖北	Húběi	鄂	È	Wuchang	武昌	Wǔchāng	
Kansu	甘肅	Gānsù	隴	Lǒng	Lanchow	蘭州	Lánzhōu	
Kiangsi	江西	Jiāngxī	贛	Gàn	Nanchang	南昌	Nánchāng	
Kiangsu	江蘇	Jiāngsū	蘇	Sū	Nanking	南京	Nánjīng	1912 area around Nanking (Nanjing) shortly split to a prefecture
Kirin	吉林	Jílín	吉	Jí	Kirin	吉林	Jílín	
Kwangsi	廣西	Guǎngxī	桂	Guì	Kweilin	桂林	Guìlín	
Kwangtung	廣東	Guǎngdōng	粵	Yuè	Canton	廣州	Guǎngzhōu	
Kweichow	貴州	Guìzhōu	黔	Qián	Kweiyang	貴陽	Guìyáng	
Shansi	山西	Shānxī	晉	Jìn	Taiyuan	太原	Tàiyuán	
Shantung	山東	Shāndōng	魯	Lǔ	Tsinan	濟南	Jǐnán	
Shensi	陝西	Shǎnxī	陝	Shǎn	Sian	西安	Xī'ān	
Sinkiang	新疆	Xīnjiāng	新	Xīn	Tihwa	迪化	Díhuà	Tihwa was renamed Ürümqi (烏魯木齊) after 1949
Szechwan	四川	Sìchuān	蜀	Shǔ	Chengtu	成都	Chéngdū	
Yunnan	雲南	Yúnnán	滇	Diān	Kunming	昆明	Kūnmíng	
Areas (地方 Dìfāng)
Capital	京兆	Jīngzhào	京	Jīng				About the place of modern Municipality of Beijing
Inner Mongolia	內蒙古	Nèiménggǔ	內蒙	Nèiméng				Inner Mongolia was divided into several Mongolian leagues and banners. There was no obvious capital. Split into Chahar, Rehe, Suiyuan in 1913–14.
Outer Mongolia	外蒙古	Wàiménggǔ	外蒙	Wàiméng	Khuree	庫倫	Kùlún	Khuree was renamed Ulaanbaatar after the independence of Mongolia
Tibet	西藏	Xīzàng	藏	Zàng	Lhasa	拉薩	Lāsà	
Tsinghai	青海	Qīnghǎi	青	Qīng	Sining	西寧	Xïníng	
Regions (區域 Qūyù)
Altay	阿爾泰	Ā'ěrtài	阿爾泰	Āěrtài	Altay	承化寺	Chénghuàsì	1920 abolished → Sinkiang; The Chinese name of the capital 承化寺 was changed to Ālètài (阿勒泰) after 1949.
Hulunbuir	呼倫貝爾	Hūlúnbèi'ěr	呼倫貝爾	Hūlúnbèi'ěr	Hailar	海拉爾	Hǎilā'ěr	1915 created, 1920 abolished → Heilungkiang
Tarbaghatay	塔爾巴哈臺	Tǎ'ěrbāhātái	塔城	Tǎchéng	Tacheng	塔城	Tǎchéng	1912 created, 1916 abolished → Sinkiang
Prefectures (府 Fǔ)
Nanking	南京	Nánjīng	寧	Níng				January 1912 created, February 1912 abolished → Kiangsu
Shuntien	順天	Shùntiān	京	Jīng				May 1914 created from Chihli, renamed Capital Area in October
Special Administrative Regions (特別區 Tèbiéqū)
Chahar	察哈爾	Cháhāěr	察	Chá	Changyuan	張垣	Zhāngyuán	1914 created from Inner Mongolia; Changyuan was renamed Zhangjiakou (張家口) after 1949.
Chwanpien	川邊	Chuānbiān	川邊	Chuānbiān	Kangting	康定	Kāngdìng	1925 renamed to Sikang
Jehol	熱河	Rèhé	熱	Rè	Chengteh	承德	Chéngdé	1914 created from Inner Mongolia
Sikang	西康	Xīkāng	康	Kāng	Kangting	康定	Kāngdìng	1925 renamed from Chwanpien
Suiyuan	綏遠	Suīyuǎn	綏	Suī	Kweisui	歸綏	Guīsuī	1913 created from Inner Mongolia; Kweisui was renamed Hohhot (呼和浩特) after 1949
Tungsheng	東省	Dōngshěng	東省	Dōngshěng	Harbin	哈爾濱	Hā'ěrbīn	Land along the Chinese Eastern Railway, spanned from Manzhouli through Harbin to Suifenhe.
Commercial Region (商埠 Shāngbù)
Kiao-ao	膠澳	Jiāo'ào	膠	Jiāo	Tsingtao	青島	Qīngdǎo	Formerly Japanese and German concession. 1925 abolished → Shantung
Sunghu	淞滬	Sōnghù	滬	Hù	Shanghai	上海	Shànghǎi	Status in dispute. Division established by the Zhili clique leader Sun Chuanfang, was not recognized by the central government.

== Nationalist Government (1928–1949) ==
Map of the Republic of China in 1936

Map of the Republic of China in 1946

Map of the Republic of China in 1949

The Nationalist government established municipalities (cities directly administered by the central government) and added sub-county levels (like townships). Circuits were abolished in 1928 as being superfluous. The reforms were impracticable; the average province had more than 50 counties with some with more than a hundred. Some provinces were later subdivided into prefectures.

- Provinces (省, shěng)
  - Administrative superintendent district (行政督察區, xíngzhèng dūcháqū)
- Counties (縣, xiàn)

Four northeast provinces (Fengtian, Heilongjiang, Rehe, Jilin) were lost to Manchukuo, a puppet state of the Empire of Japan, in the 1930s. Counties in multiple provinces were lost to the Chinese Soviet Republic in 1931, with most being recovered in 1934 before the Long March.

Following the end of the Second World War in 1945, Manchuria was reincorporated as nine provinces and three municipalities, and Taiwan Province was created by annexing the island of Taiwan and the Penghu islands. By this time there was a total of thirty-five provinces, twelve municipalities (院轄市, yuànxiáshì), one special administrative region (特別行政區, tèbié xíngzhèngqǖ), and two regions (地方, difāng) as first-level divisions.

China recognized the Mongolian People's Republic following the 1945 Sino-Soviet Treaty of Friendship and Alliance, formally relinquishing claims on the area of Outer Mongolia.

Administrative divisions of the Republic of China (1928–1949)
Division name			Abbreviation		Capital name			Note
Postal	Chinese	Pinyin	Chinese	Pinyin	Postal	Chinese	Pinyin	Note
Provinces (省 Shěng)
Antung	安東	Āndōng	安	Ān	Tunghwa	通化	Tōnghuà	1947 created from Manchukuo (originally part of Liaoning)
Anhwei	安徽	Ānhuī	皖	Wǎn	Hofei	合肥	Héféi	
Chahar	察哈爾	Cháhāěr	察	Chá	Kalgan	張垣	Zhāngyuán	1928 reformed from a special administrative region Kalgan was renamed Zhangjiakou (張家口) after 1949.
Chekiang	浙江	Zhèjiāng	浙	Zhè	Hangchow	杭州	Hángzhōu	
Fukien	福建	Fújiàn	閩	Mǐn	Foochow	福州	Fúzhōu	
Heilungkiang	黑龍江	Hēilóngjiāng	黑	Hēi	Peian	北安	Běi'ān	1945 recreated from Manchukuo
Hokiang	合江	Héjiāng	合	Hé	Chiamussu	佳木斯	Jiāmùsī	1947 created from Manchukuo (originally part of Kirin)
Honan	河南	Hénán	豫	Yù	Kaifeng	開封	Kāifēng	
Hopeh	河北	Héběi	冀	Jì	Tsingyuan	清苑	Qīngyuàn	1928 renamed from Chihli; Tsingyuan was renamed to Baoding (保定) after 1949
Hunan	湖南	Húnán	湘	Xiāng	Changsha	長沙	Chángshā	
Hupeh	湖北	Húběi	鄂	È	Wuchang	武昌	Wǔchāng	
Hsingan	興安	Xīng'ān	興	Xīng	Hailar	海拉爾	Hǎilā'ěr	1947 created from Manchukuo (originally part of Heilungkiang); Hailar was renamed to Hulunbuir (呼倫貝爾) after 1949
Jehol	熱河	Rèhé	熱	Rè	Chengteh	承德	Chéngdé	1928 reformed from a special administrative region, 1945 recreated from Manchukuo
Kansu	甘肅	Gānsù	隴	Lǒng	Lanchow	蘭州	Lánzhōu	
Kiangsi	江西	Jiāngxī	贛	Gàn	Nanchang	南昌	Nánchāng	
Kiangsu	江蘇	Jiāngsū	蘇	Sū	Chinkiang	鎮江	Zhènjiāng	
Kirin	吉林	Jílín	吉	Jí	Kirin	吉林	Jílín	1945 recreated from Manchukuo
Kwangsi	廣西	Guǎngxī	桂	Guì	Kweilin	桂林	Guìlín	
Kwangtung	廣東	Guǎngdōng	粵	Yuè	Canton	廣州	Guǎngzhōu	
Kweichow	貴州	Guìzhōu	黔	Qián	Kweiyang	貴陽	Guìyáng	
Liaoning	遼寧	Liáoníng	遼	Liáo	Mukden	瀋陽	Shěnyáng	1929 renamed from Fengtien, 1945 recreated from Manchukuo
Liaopeh	遼北	Liáoběi	洮	Táo	Liaoyuan	遼源	Liáoyuán	1947 created from Manchukuo (originally part of Liaoning)
Ningsia	寧夏	Níngxià	寧	Níng	Yinchwan	銀川	Yínchuān	1928 created from Kansu
Nunkiang	嫩江	Nènjiāng	嫩	Nèn	Tsitsihar	齊齊哈爾	Qíqíhā'ěr	1947 created from Manchukuo (originally part of Heilungkiang)
Shansi	山西	Shānxī	晉	Jìn	Taiyuan	太原	Tàiyuán	
Shantung	山東	Shāndōng	魯	Lǔ	Tsinan	濟南	Jǐnán	
Shensi	陝西	Shǎnxī	陝	Shǎn	Sian	西安	Xī'ān	
Sikang	西康	Xīkāng	康	Kāng	Kangting	康定	Kāngdìng	1928 reformed from a special administrative region
Sinkiang	新疆	Xīnjiāng	新	Xīn	Tihwa	迪化	Díhuà	Tihwa was renamed Ürümqi (烏魯木齊) after 1949
Suiyuan	綏遠	Suīyuǎn	綏	Suī	Kweisui	歸綏	Guīsuī	1928 reformed from a special administrative region Kweisui was renamed Hohhot (呼和浩特) after 1949
Sungkiang	松江	Sōngjiāng	松	Sōng	Mutankiang	牡丹江	Mǔdānjiāng	1947 created from Manchukuo (originally part of Kirin)
Szechwan	四川	Sìchuān	蜀	Shǔ	Chengtu	成都	Chéngdū	
Taiwan	臺灣	Táiwān	臺	Tái	Taipei	臺北	Táiběi	1945 annexed from Japan; Consists of Taiwan and Penghu islands
Tsinghai	青海	Qīnghǎi	青	Qīng	Sining	西寧	Xīníng	1928 reformed from an area
Yunnan	雲南	Yúnnán	滇	Diān	Kunming	昆明	Kūnmíng	
Special Administrative Regions (特別行政區 Tèbiéxíngzhèngqū)
Hainan	海南	Hǎinán	瓊	Qióng	Haikow	海口	Hǎikǒu	1931 Kiung-ai (瓊崖) was planned to create, 1949 created from Kwangtung
Tungsheng	東省	Dōngshěng	東省	Dōngshěng	Harbin	哈爾濱	Hā'ěrbīn	1932 abolished by Manchukuo
Weihai	威海	Wēihāi	威海	Wēihāi	Weihai	威海	Wēihāi	1930 acquired from the United Kingdom, 1945 abolished → Shantung
Areas (地方 Dìfāng)
Mongolia	蒙古	Ménggǔ	蒙	Méng	Khuree	庫倫	Kùlún	Khuree was renamed Ulaan Bator after the independence of Mongolia
Tibet	西藏	Xīzàng	藏	Zàng	Lhasa	拉薩	Lāsà	
Special municipalities (直轄市 Zhíxiáshì)
Canton	廣州	Guǎngzhōu	穗	Suì	January 1930 created from Kwangtung, June 1930 merged back. 1947 recreated			
Chungking	重慶	Chóngqìng	渝	Yú	1927 created from Szechwan			
Dairen	大連	Dàlián	連	Lián	1947 created from Manchukuo (originally part of Liaoning)			
Hankow	漢口	Hànkǒu	漢	Hàn	1927 created Wuhan from Hupeh, 1929 renamed to Hankow, 1931 merged back, 1947 recreated			
Harbin	哈爾濱	Hā'ěrbīn	哈	Hā	1947 created from Manchukuo (originally part of Heilungkiang)			
Mukden	瀋陽	Shěnyáng	瀋	Shěn	1947 created from Manchukuo (originally part of Liaoning)			
Nanking	南京	Nánjīng	京	Jīng	1927 created from Kiangsu			
Peiping	北平	Běipíng	平	Píng	1928 created from Hopeh, Jun 1930 merged back, Dec 1930 recreated. 1949 renamed back to Peking (北京)			
Shanghai	上海	Shànghǎi	滬	Hù	1927 reform Sunghu commercial region to a municipality, created from Kiangsu			
Sian	西安	Xī'ān	安	Ān	1933 planned to create Siking (西京), 1947 created from Shensi			
Tientsin	天津	Tiānjīn	津	Jīn	1928 created from Hopeh, 1930 merged back. 1935 recreated			
Tsingtao	青島	Qīngdǎo	青	Qīng	1929 created from Shantung.			

== Administrative divisions published after 1949 ==
A map showing the official divisions and territories historically claimed by the Republic of China, along with their status as of 2005

Map comparing political divisions as drawn by the Republic of China and the People's Republic of China

After its loss of the mainland to the Communist Party in the Chinese Civil War and its retreat to Taiwan in 1949, the Nationalist Party continued to regard the Republic of China as the internationally recognized sole legitimate government of China. The jurisdiction of the Republic was restricted to Taiwan, the Penghu, and a few islands off Fujian, but the Republic of China has never retracted its claim to mainland China. Moreover, the Kuomintang government in Taiwan unilaterally overturned its recognition of Mongolia in 1953. Accordingly, the official first-order divisions of Republic of China remain the historical divisions of China immediately prior to the loss of mainland China and maps of China and the world published in Taiwan sometimes show provincial and national boundaries as they were in 1949, ignoring changes made by the Communist government and including Outer Mongolia (includes Tannu Uriankhai), Jiangxinpo (northern Burma/Kachin State), as part of the Republic. Until 1998, the authorities in Taiwan still published relevant maps.

As of the ROC government suspends publication of relevant administrative codes in 2005, the nominal political divisions of the Republic were 35 provinces, 1 special administrative region, 2 regions, 18 special municipalities (adding Taipei and Kaohsiung to the original list with four added in 2010 and 2014), 14 leagues, and 4 special banners. For second-order divisions, under provinces and special administrative regions, there are counties (2,035), province-controlled cities (56), bureaus (34) and management bureaus (7). Under provincial-level municipalities there are districts, and under leagues there are banners (127).

- Provinces (省, shěng) and Special municipalities (直轄市, zhíxiáshì)
- Counties (縣, xiàn) and Cities (市, shì)

Changes made to Province-level divisions of the Republic of China between 1949 and 2019
Name	Traditional Chinese	Pinyin	Abbreviation	Capital	Capital in Chinese	Notes
Provinces
Fukien	福建	Fújiàn	閩 mǐn	Jincheng Township	金城鎮	The capital of Fujian Province was moved to Xindian in 1956, and moved to Jincheng Township, Kinmen since 1996. The Fujian Provincial Government was de facto abolished in 2019.
Taiwan	臺灣	Táiwān	臺 tái	Zhongxing New Village	中興新村	The capital of Taiwan Province was moved to Zhongxing New Village in Nantou County from Taipei in the 1960s. The government was de facto dissolved in 2018.
Kiangsu	江蘇	Jiāngsū	蘇 sū	Shengsi County	嵊泗縣	The government of Kiangsu Province was moved to Shengsi County in 1949. In 1950 the county was conquered by the PLA and the Kiangsu Provincial Government was abolished soon after.
Chekiang	浙江	Zhèjiāng	浙 zhè	Taiwan Province	臺灣省	The government of Chekiang Province in Ganlan Township of Dinghai County was abolished in 1950. In 1951, the provincial government was re-established on the Tachen Islands of Wenling County, later to be moved to Taiwan Province in 1953. After the loss of the Yijiangshan Islands during the Battle of Yijiangshan Islands in 1955, the provincial government was abolished.
Szechwan	四川	Sìchuān	蜀 shǔ	Xichang County	西昌縣	After the loss of its capital of Chengdu in December 1949, the Provincial Government was moved to Xichang County of Xikang Province and remained there until its abolishment in 1950.
Sikang	西康	Xīkāng	康 kāng	Xichang County	西昌縣	The government of Xikang Province was re-established in Xichang County in Dec. 1949. In 1950, Xichang was taken over by the PLA.
Kwangtung	廣東	Guǎngdōng	粵 yuè	Haikou City	海口市	The government of Kwangtung Province was moved to Haikou City of Hainan in 1949 after the loss of its capital Guangdong. After the loss of Hainan in 1950, the government was subsequently abolished.
Yunnan	雲南	Yúnnán	滇 diān	Kunming	昆明	The government of Yunnan was moved to Bangkok in 1950 and abolished in 1951.
Sinkiang	新疆	Xīnjiāng	新 xīn	Dihua City	迪化市	Provincial Government of Sinkiang was abolished in 1992.
Special Administrative Regions
Hainan	海南	Hǎinán	瓊 qióng	Haikow City	海口市	Government abolished in 1950. Pratas Island transferred to Kaohsiung in 1996.
Special Municipalities						The Chinese name 院轄市 Yuànxiáshì was changed to 直轄市 Zhíxiáshì in 1994.
Kaohsiung	高雄	Gāoxióng	高 gāo	Lingya District	苓雅區	Kaohsiung was elevated in 1979.
New Taipei	新北	Xīnběi	新 xīn	Banqiao District	板橋區	New Taipei was elevated in 2010.
Taichung	臺中	Táizhōng	中 zhōng	Xitun District	西屯區	Taichung was elevated in 2010.
Tainan	臺南	Táinán	南 nán	Anping District	安平區	Tainan was elevated in 2010.
Taipei	臺北	Táiběi	北 běi	Xinyi District	信義區	Taipei was elevated in 1967.
Taoyuan	桃園	Táoyuán	桃 táo	Taoyuan District	桃園區	Taoyuan was elevated in 2014.

After Taiwan's first political party rotation, the Democratic Progressive Party (DPP) administration have officially renounced claims to Mongolia in 2002. Although the administration of pro-independence President Chen Shui-bian (2000–2008) did not actively claim sovereignty over all of China, the relevant laws involving mainland China ruled by the CCP remain unchanged. Thus, the claimed area of the ROC continues to include mainland China, several off-shore islands, and Taiwan.

Beginning in 2006, the ROC Yearbook, under Chen's administration, ceased displaying official administrative divisions in mainland China. It recognized two provinces (Taiwan and Fujian) and two special municipalities (Taipei and Kaohsiung). President Ma Ying-jeou reasserted the ROC's claim to be the sole legitimate government of China and the claim that mainland China is part of ROC's territory. He did not, however, actively seek reunification, and preferred to maintain an ambiguous status quo in order to improve relations with the PRC. On May 21, 2012, the Mainland Affairs Council released a press announcement that said that Outer Mongolia has never been part of its constitutionally claimed territory.

In 2016, a pre-1949 map of the ROC was installed in the Legislative Yuan which drew the ire of the lawmakers who called for the removal or replacement of a map in the Legislative Yuan which shows Nanjing as the ROC capital, and portrays Mongolia as part of its territory despite it was recognized again in 2002. Kuomintang legislator William Tseng said that the map is accurate, until the Constitution and laws are amended to change the nation's official territory while DPP lawmaker Chen Ting-fei stated, "With the way it portrays the ROC territory, that map is like one from a parallel universe—it is out of step with current thinking." Eventually, this outdated world map was removed and replaced with maps of Taiwan from different periods.

After the streamlining of Fujian and Taiwan provincial governments in 1956 and 1998, the Tsai Ing-wen administration de facto abolished the Taiwan Provincial Government on 1 July 2018 and the Fujian Provincial Government on 1 January 2019. With the first-level provinces retained under its constitutional structure, the Executive Yuan now administers the second-level 13 counties and 3 provincial cities (autonomous municipalities) in its place along with the 6 special municipalities.

== See also ==
- Administrative divisions of the Republic of China
- Physiographic macroregions of China
- Republic of China (1912–1949)
