= Administrative divisions of Manchukuo =

Map of administrative divisions of Manchukuo in 1938

The administrative divisions of Manchukuo consisted of a number of provinces plus the special municipalities of Xinjing (新京特別市) and Harbin (哈爾浜特別市), and the Beiman Special Region (北満特別区).

The number of provinces was five in 1932, corresponding to the original provinces under Qing dynasty China. The number was increased to 19 by 1941. Each province was further divided into prefectures (four in Xing'an East and 24 in Fengtian). Beiman Special Region lasted less than 3 years (July 1, 1933 – January 1, 1936) while Harbin was later incorporated into Binjiang Province.

Year
1932	1934	1937	1939	1941	1943
Longjiang Province 龍江省	Heihe Province 黒河省	Heihe Province 黒河省	Heihe Province 黒河省	Heihe Province 黒河省	Heihe Province 黒河省
Longjiang Province 龍江省	Sanjiang Province 三江省	Sanjiang Province 三江省	Sanjiang Province 三江省	Sanjiang Province 三江省	Sanjiang Province 三江省
Longjiang Province 龍江省	Longjiang Province 龍江省	Longjiang Province 龍江省	Longjiang Province 龍江省	Longjiang Province 龍江省	Longjiang Province 龍江省
Longjiang Province 龍江省	Longjiang Province 龍江省	Longjiang Province 龍江省	Bei'an Province 北安省	Bei'an Province 北安省	Bei'an Province 北安省
Jilin Province 吉林省	Binjiang Province 濱江省	Binjiang Province 濱江省	Bei'an Province 北安省	Bei'an Province 北安省	Bei'an Province 北安省
Jilin Province 吉林省	Binjiang Province 濱江省	Binjiang Province 濱江省	Binjiang Province 濱江省	Binjiang Province 濱江省	Binjiang Province 濱江省
Jilin Province 吉林省	Binjiang Province 濱江省	Mudanjiang Province 牡丹江省	Mudanjiang Province 牡丹江省	Mudanjiang Province 牡丹江省	Dongman; Consolidated Province 東満総省
Jilin Province 吉林省	Binjiang Province 濱江省	Mudanjiang Province 牡丹江省	Dong'an Province 東安省	Dong'an Province 東安省	Dongman; Consolidated Province 東満総省
Jilin Province 吉林省	Jiandao Province 間島省	Jiandao Province 間島省	Jiandao Province 間島省	Jiandao Province 間島省	Dongman; Consolidated Province 東満総省
Jilin Province 吉林省	Jilin Province 吉林省	Jilin Province 吉林省	Jilin Province 吉林省	Jilin Province 吉林省	Jilin Province 吉林省
Fengtian Province 奉天省	Andong Province 安東省	Andong Province 安東省	Andong Province 安東省	Andong Province 安東省	Andong Province 安東省
Fengtian Province 奉天省	Andong Province 安東省	Andong Province 安東省	Tonghua Province 通化省	Tonghua Province 通化省	Tonghua Province 通化省
Fengtian Province 奉天省	Fengtian Province 奉天省	Fengtian Province 奉天省	Fengtian Province 奉天省	Fengtian Province 奉天省	Fengtian Province 奉天省
Fengtian Province 奉天省	Fengtian Province 奉天省	Fengtian Province 奉天省	Fengtian Province 奉天省	Siping Province 四平省	Siping Province 四平省
Fengtian Province 奉天省	Jinzhou Province 錦州省	Jinzhou Province 錦州省	Jinzhou Province 錦州省	Jinzhou Province 錦州省	Jinzhou Province 錦州省
Xing'an Province 興安省	Xing'an Province 興安省	Xing'an Province 興安省	Xing'an Province; North 興安北省	Xing'an Province; North 興安北省	Xing'an; Consolidated Province 興安総省
Xing'an Province 興安省	Xing'an Province 興安省	Xing'an Province 興安省	Xing'an Province; East 興安東省	Xing'an Province; East 興安東省	Xing'an; Consolidated Province 興安総省
Xing'an Province 興安省	Xing'an Province 興安省	Xing'an Province 興安省	Xing'an Province; South 興安南省	Xing'an Province; South 興安南省	Xing'an; Consolidated Province 興安総省
Xing'an Province 興安省	Xing'an Province 興安省	Xing'an Province 興安省	Xing'an Province; West 興安西省	Xing'an Province; West 興安西省	Xing'an; Consolidated Province 興安総省
Rehe Province 熱河省	Rehe Province 熱河省	Rehe Province 熱河省	Rehe Province 熱河省	Rehe Province 熱河省	Rehe Province 熱河省
Xinjing Special Municipality 新京特別市	Xinjing Special Municipality 新京特別市	Xinjing Special Municipality 新京特別市	Xinjing Special Municipality 新京特別市	Xinjing Special Municipality 新京特別市	Xinjing Special Municipality 新京特別市

== See also ==
- History of the administrative divisions of China (1912–49)
