= Shuangliao =

Shuangliao 双辽市
- County-level city
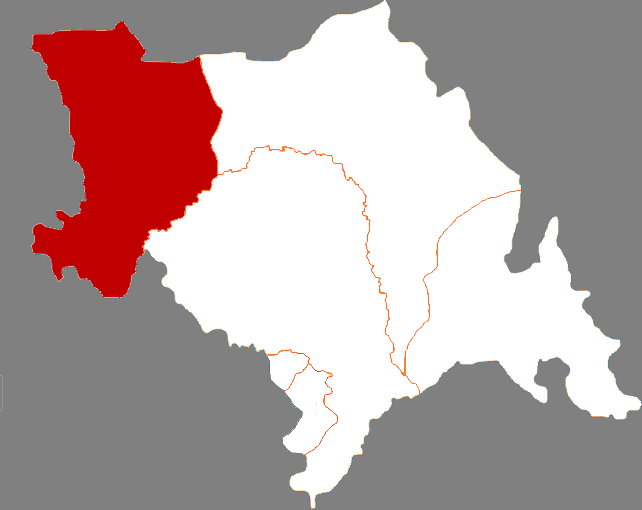
- Shuangliao in Siping

- Location in Jilin
- Coordinates: 43°31′06″N 123°30′10″E
- Country: People's Republic of China
- Province: Jilin
- Prefecture-level city: Siping
- Seat: Zhengjiatun Subdistrict (郑家屯街道)

Area
  - County-level city: 3,121.3 km^{2} (1,205.1 sq mi)
  - Urban: 149.20 km^{2} (57.61 sq mi)
- Elevation: 118 m (387 ft)

Population (2017)
  - County-level city: 407,000
  - Density: 130/km^{2} (338/sq mi)
  - Urban: 128,600
- Time zone: UTC+8 (China Standard)
- Postal code: 136400
- Area code: 0434

Shuangliao (simplified Chinese: 双辽; traditional Chinese: 雙遼; pinyin: Shuāngliáo) is a city in western Jilin, People's Republic of China, bordering Liaoning and Inner Mongolia. It is under the administration of Siping City and was previously the de jure capital of the defunct Liaobei Province.

== Administrative divisions ==
Subdistricts:

- Zhengjiatun Subdistrict (郑家屯街道), Liaodong Subdistrict (辽东街道), Liaonan Subdistrict (辽南街道), Liaoxi Subdistrict (辽西街道), Liaobei Subdistrict (辽北街道), Hongqi Subdistrict (红旗街道)

Towns:

- Maolin (茂林镇), Shuangshan (双山镇), Wohu (卧虎镇), Fuxian (服先镇), Wangben (王奔镇), Bolishan (玻璃山镇), Xinglong (兴隆镇), Dongming (东明镇)

Townships:

- Liutiao Township (柳条乡), Xinli Township (新立乡), Xiangyang Township (向阳乡), Yongjia Township (永加乡), Namusi Mongol Ethnic Township (那木斯蒙古族乡)

== Geography and climate ==
Shuangliao is located at the confluence of the western and eastern branches of the Liao River as well as the Songliao Plain with the Horqin Grasslands (科尔沁草原). It borders Changtu County (Liaoning) and Lishu County to the south, Gongzhuling to the east, Changling County to the north, and the Horqin Left Middle and Left Back banners of Inner Mongolia. The administrative area reaches 89 km (55 mi) in north-south extent and 62 km (39 mi) in east-west width, covering an area of 3,121.2 km^{2} (1,205.1 sq mi).

Shuangliao has a four-season, monsoon-influenced, humid continental climate (Köppen Dwa). Winters are long (lasting from November to March), cold, and windy, but dry, with a January 24-hour average temperature of −14.5 °C (5.9 °F). Spring and fall are somewhat short transitional periods, with some precipitation, but are usually dry and windy. Summers are hot and humid, with a July average of 23.7 °C (74.7 °F). Over two-thirds of the annual precipitation of 459.5 millimetres (18.1 in) occurs from June to August. The annual mean temperature is 6.5 °C (43.7 °F), while the frost-free period averages 145 days and annual sunshine duration lasts 2,714.9 hours.

Climate data for Shuangliao, elevation 118 m (387 ft), (1991–2020 normals, extremes 1971–2010)
Month	Jan	Feb	Mar	Apr	May	Jun	Jul	Aug	Sep	Oct	Nov	Dec	Year
Record high °C (°F)	7.0 (44.6)	16.8 (62.2)	21.6 (70.9)	32.5 (90.5)	36.0 (96.8)	39.1 (102.4)	36.0 (96.8)	36.8 (98.2)	33.6 (92.5)	27.7 (81.9)	20.4 (68.7)	11.3 (52.3)	39.1 (102.4)
Mean daily maximum °C (°F)	−7.1 (19.2)	−1.6 (29.1)	6.3 (43.3)	16.1 (61.0)	23.4 (74.1)	27.7 (81.9)	29.1 (84.4)	27.9 (82.2)	23.4 (74.1)	15.0 (59.0)	3.5 (38.3)	−5.3 (22.5)	13.2 (55.8)
Daily mean °C (°F)	−14.2 (6.4)	−8.8 (16.2)	−0.3 (31.5)	9.3 (48.7)	16.9 (62.4)	21.8 (71.2)	24.1 (75.4)	22.5 (72.5)	16.3 (61.3)	8.0 (46.4)	−2.6 (27.3)	−11.6 (11.1)	6.8 (44.2)
Mean daily minimum °C (°F)	−19.9 (−3.8)	−15.0 (5.0)	−6.5 (20.3)	2.5 (36.5)	10.3 (50.5)	16.2 (61.2)	19.6 (67.3)	17.7 (63.9)	9.9 (49.8)	1.8 (35.2)	−7.8 (18.0)	−17.0 (1.4)	1.0 (33.8)
Record low °C (°F)	−38.8 (−37.8)	−33.6 (−28.5)	−23.4 (−10.1)	−9.9 (14.2)	−1.2 (29.8)	3.6 (38.5)	9.2 (48.6)	5.3 (41.5)	−2.8 (27.0)	−14.4 (6.1)	−25.6 (−14.1)	−34.5 (−30.1)	−38.8 (−37.8)
Average precipitation mm (inches)	2.4 (0.09)	2.5 (0.10)	8.6 (0.34)	15.3 (0.60)	46.1 (1.81)	80.1 (3.15)	115.4 (4.54)	112.0 (4.41)	36.7 (1.44)	21.3 (0.84)	9.5 (0.37)	3.8 (0.15)	453.7 (17.84)
Average precipitation days (≥ 0.1 mm)	2.4	1.8	3.5	4.6	8.7	12.0	11.0	10.3	6.7	4.4	3.6	3.5	72.5
Average snowy days	4.0	3.2	4.1	1.5	0	0	0	0	0	0.9	3.6	5.2	22.5
Average relative humidity (%)	62	54	48	45	51	65	78	80	71	62	61	64	62
Mean monthly sunshine hours	215.9	222.9	264.7	259.4	278.6	258.1	233.7	238.4	241.0	228.5	192.5	195.4	2,829.1
Percentage possible sunshine	74	75	71	64	61	56	50	56	65	68	67	71	65
Source 1: China Meteorological Administration
Source 2: Weather China
