= Nenjiang Province =

Province of the Republic of China

Lungkiang Province (1934–1945) Nunkiang Province (1945–1949) 龍江省 (1934–1945) 嫩江省 (1945–1949)
- Province of the Manchukuo (1934–1945); Province of the Republic of China (1945–1949); Province of the People's Republic of China (1949)
- 1934–1949
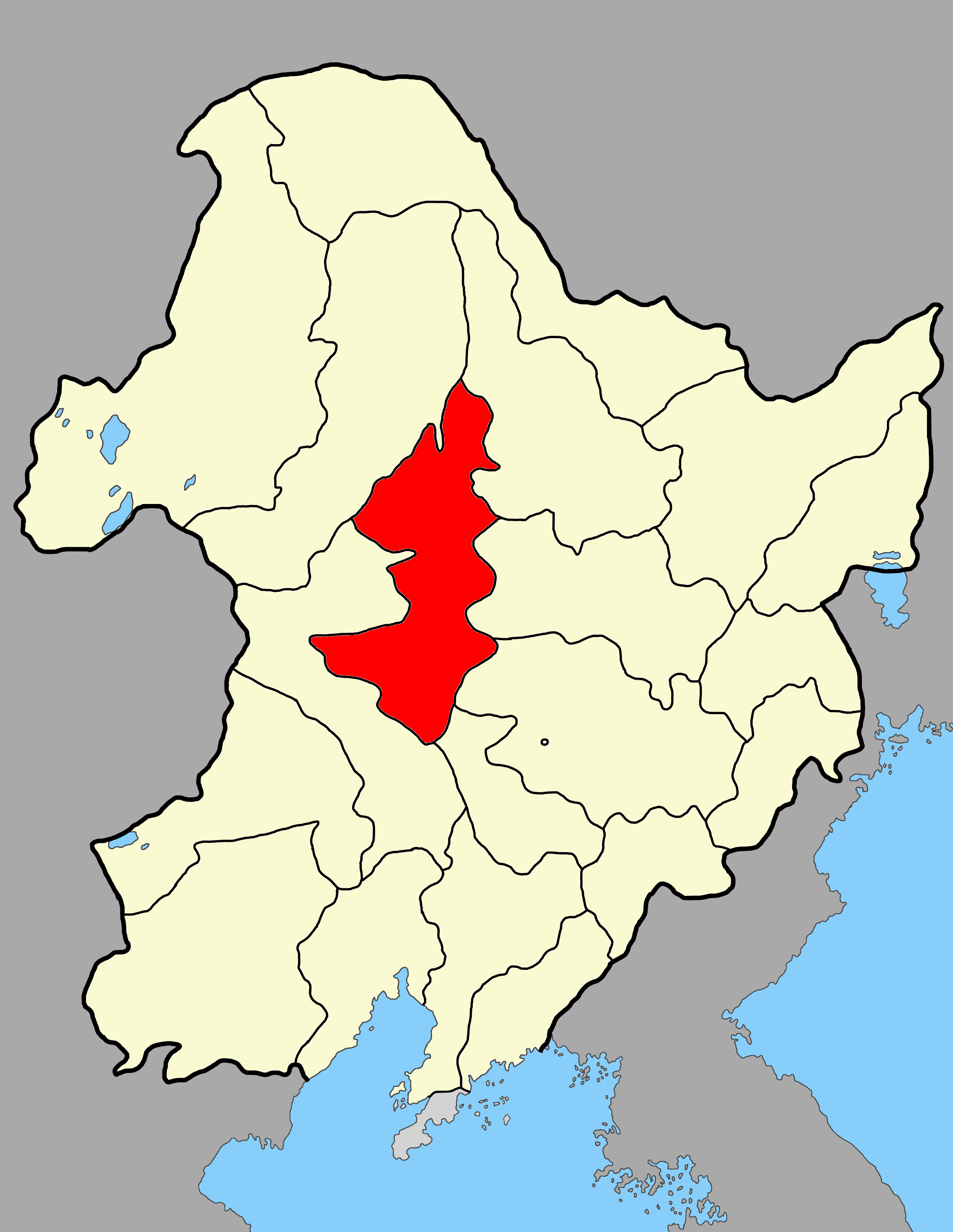
- Map of Longjiang within Manchukuo

- Map of Nenjiang within the ROC
- Capital: Cicigar
- Area
  - 1947: 67,034 km^{2} (25,882 sq mi)
- Population
  - 1947: 3,308,906
- History
  - Established: 1934
  - Disestablished: 1954
Preceded by	Succeeded by
Fengtian; Heilongjiang	Heilongjiang
- Today part of: China ∟ Heilongjiang

Nunkiang or Nenjiang (Chinese: 嫩江; pinyin: Nènjiāng) was a province in Northeast China, which was established in 1945. It was c.26,000 sq mi/67,340 km^{2} large and the provincial capital was Qiqihar. The province was abolished in 1950 and incorporated with Heilongjiang province.

== See also ==
- Chinese irredentism § Taiwan
