= Statistics and Census Service (Macau) =

Government statistical agency of Macau

Chinese name
- Traditional Chinese: 統計暨普查局
- Simplified Chinese: 统计暨普查局
Transcriptions
Standard Mandarin
- Hanyu Pinyin: Tǒngjì jì Pǔchá Jú
Yue: Cantonese
- Jyutping: tung2 gai3 kei3 pou2 caa4 guk6

Portuguese name
- Portuguese: Direcção dos Serviços de Estatística e Censos

The Statistics and Census Service (Portuguese: Direcção dos Serviços de Estatística e Censos, DSEC; Chinese: 統計暨普查局) is the statistics agency of Macau. Its head office is on the 17th floor of Dynasty Plaza (皇朝廣場) in Sé (Cathedral Parish).
