= Andong Province =

Province of China (1945–1949)

Andong Province (1934–1949) Liaodong Province (1949–1954) 安東省 (1934–1949) 遼東省 (1949–1954)
- Province of Manchukuo (1934–1945); Province of the Republic of China (1945–1949); Province of the People's Republic of China (1949–1954)
- 1934–1954
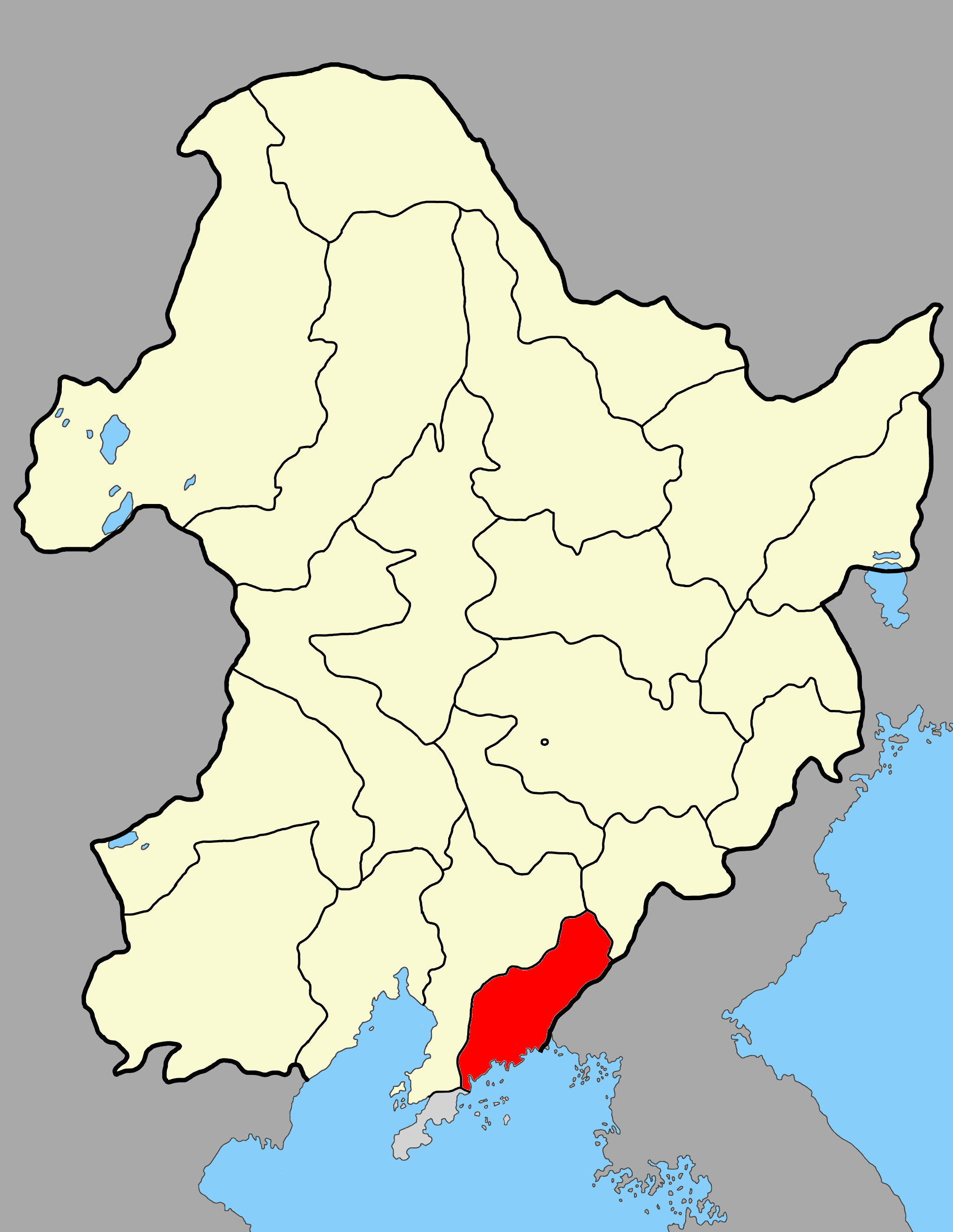
- Map of Andong within Manchukuo
- Map of Andong within the ROC
- Capital: Antung (1934–1945); Tunghwa (1945–1949); Antung (1949–1954)
- Area
  - 1947: 62,279.23 km^{2} (24,046.15 sq mi)
- Population
  - 1947: 2,971,170
- History
  - Established: 1934
  - Disestablished: 1954
Preceded by
Fengtian province
Tonghua Province
Succeeded by
Tonghua Province
Liaoning
Jilin
- Today part of: China ∟ Liaoning ∟ Jilin

Andong (Note: or Antung (Wade-Giles); traditional Chinese: 安東省; simplified Chinese: 安东省; pinyin: Āndōng Shěng; lit. 'Pacify the East'), or Liaodong (Note: simplified Chinese: 辽东省; traditional Chinese: 遼東省; pinyin: Liáodōng Shěng; lit. 'East of the Liao'.), was a former province in Northeast China, located in what is now part of Liaoning and Jilin provinces. It was bordered on the southeast by the Yalu River, which separated it from Korea.

== History ==
The name of the province Antung in Chinese means "pacify the east" and was likely inspired by the Protectorate General to Pacify the East established during the Tang Dynasty.

Antung Province was first created in 1934 as a province of the Japanese-controlled Empire of Manchukuo, when the former Fengtian Province was divided into three parts: Antung Province, Fengtian Province and Jinzhou Province. In 1939, Antung was further sub-divided into Antung Province and Tonghua Province.

After Manchukuo was annexed by the Republic of China, following the end of World War II, the Kuomintang reunited Antung and Tonghua, and continued to recognize the area as Antung Province. However, under the administration of the People's Republic of China, Antung Province was renamed Liaodong Province. It was abolished in 1954, with its area divided between Liaoning Province and Jilin Province.

== Administration division ==
The capital of Antung Province from 1934–1939 was Tonghua, in present-day Jilin. However, after the administrative reorganization of 1939, the capital moved to Antung, an important border town between Manchukuo and Korea, and a major center on the railroad from Korea to Mukden.

The area of the province (from 1934–1939 and 1945–1954) was 62,160 km^{2} (24,000 sq mi).

=== 1949–1954 ===
Name	Administrative Seat	Simplified Chinese	Hanyu Pinyin	Subdivisions
Andong	Andong	安东市	Āndōng Shì	6 districts
Yingkou	Yingkou	营口市	Yíngkǒu Shì	5 districts
Tonghua	Tonghua	通化市	Tōnghuà Shì	none
Liaoyang	Liaoyang	辽阳市	Liáoyáng Shì	none
Tongliao Division	Xi'an	通辽专区	Tōngliáo Zhuānqū	1 city & 4 counties
Directly-controlled				25 counties

== See also ==
- Chinese irredentism § Taiwan
- List of administrative divisions of Manchukuo
