= Liaobei =

Province of the Republic of China

Liaobei Province 遼北省
- Province of the Republic of China
- 1945–1948
- Map showing Liaobei under de jure ROC control.
- Capital: Liaoyüan (de jure); Szeping (de facto)
- Area
  - 1948: 121,624 km^{2} (46,959 sq mi)
- Population
  - 1948: 4,904,399
- History
  - Siping Province established by Manchukuo: 1941
  - Established: 1945
  - Disestablished: 1948
Preceded by	Succeeded by
Siping Province	Liaoxi
- Today part of: China ∟ Liaoning

Liaobei (Wade-Giles: Liaopei) also known as Liaopeh was a province of the Republic of China. Located in Manchuria, the major part of the area of Liaobei constitutes the parts of province which is now in Inner Mongolia, now under the de facto jurisdiction of the People's Republic of China. Its de jure capital was located in Liaoyuan City (present-day Shuangliao, Jilin), but the de facto capital was at Siping City since Liaoyuan was already occupied by the Communists.

Today the area of the former Liaobei province spread across Inner Mongolia, Jilin and Liaoning.

As the ROC did not recognize changes in administrative divisions made by the PRC, official maps sanctioned by the ROC government showed Liaobei Province in its pre-1949 borders.

== Administrative divisions ==
Liaobei was divided into 1 city, 19 counties and 6 banners.

== See also ==
- Chinese irredentism § Taiwan
