= Jinzhou (Manchukuo province) =

Defunct province in East Asia

Jinzhou 錦州
- Province of Manchukuo
- 1934–1945
- Location of Jinzhou in Manchukuo
- Capital: Jinzhou
- History
  - Established: 1 December 1934
  - Disestablished: 20 August 1945
- Today part of: China; Liaoning

Jinzhou (Chinese: 錦州) was one of the provinces of Manchukuo. On December 1, 1934, Jinzhou was established after it was split from Fengtian. On August 20, 1945, Jinzhou was disestablished after the dissolution of Manchukuo in the Soviet–Japanese War.

Jinzhou was mostly Chinese with Korean minorities within it too. Many Japanese settlers migrated to the area, during which many human rights abuses were committed. It was exploited by Japan for its resources and used to launch an invasion of China during the Second Sino–Japanese War.

== Administrative divisions ==
- Jinzhou City
- Fuxin City
- Jinxian
- Jinxi County
- Xingcheng County
- Suizhong County
- Yixian
- Beizhen County
- Panshan County
- Tai'an County
- Heishan County
- Zhangwu County
- Tumote Right Banner
- Tumut Zhongqi
- Tumote Zuoqi

== Governors ==
- Sir Xu Shou : December 1, 1934 – July 1, 1937
- Wang Zidong : July 1, 1937 – July 28, 1938
- Jiang Enzhi : July 28, 1938 – October 11, 1941
- Wang Duanrui : October 11, 1941 – August 20, 1945

== See also ==
- List of administrative divisions of Manchukuo
