= Xing'an Province =

Former province of China

Hsingan Province 興安省
- Province of the Manchukuo (1932–1945); Province of the Republic of China (1945–1949)
- 1932–1949
- Map of Hsingan within the ROC
- Capital: Hailar
- Area
  - 1947: 278,437 km^{2} (107,505 sq mi)
- Population
  - 1947: 322,173
- History
  - Established: 1932
  - Disestablished: 1949
Preceded by	Succeeded by
Inner Mongolia under Qing rule	Inner Mongolia
- Today part of: China ∟ Inner Mongolia

Xing'an (Chinese: 興安省; pinyin: Xīng'ān shěng; or Hsingan) refers to a former province, which once occupied western Heilongjiang and part of northwest Jilin provinces of China. The name is related to that of the Greater Khingan Mountains. Another name used for this land was Barga, which is also the name used for the western part of the province, the Barga district.

== Administration ==
The capital of Xing'an was the town of Hailar (or Hulun), on the China Eastern Railway line near the Russian border. Xing'an was divided into various sub-prefectures, similar in form to other Manchukuo provinces. The second city of importance was Manzhouli.

== History ==
Xing'an province was first created in 1932 as an administrative sub-division of the Japanese-controlled Empire of Manchukuo. From 1939 to 1943, the province was divided into four parts, labeled Xing'an North, Xing'an East, Xing'an South and Xing'an West. These four provinces were reunited into a Xing'an Consolidated Province (興安総省) in 1943. Xing'an at 380,000 square kilometres (148,000 square miles) encompassed nearly one third of the land area of Manchukuo.

The population of Xing'an, estimated at 965,000 in 1935, was predominantly ethnically Mongol, and Xing'an was therefore administered by a local Mongol prince (under supervision of a Japanese resident supervisor).

Xing'an was the site of a number of clashes in the Soviet-Japanese Border Wars, most notably the Nomonhan Incident where Japanese Kwantung Army and Manchukuo Imperial Army forces were defeated by the Soviet Red Army in 1939.

After the annexation of Manchukuo by the Republic of China after the end of World War II, the Kuomintang continued to recognize the area as Xing'an Province, with the capital in Hailar. However, under the administration of the People's Republic of China from 1949, the area was annexed to the Inner Mongolia Autonomous Region, and is now referred to as the Hulunbuir Prefecture-level city. The population is now estimated to be over 80% ethnic Han Chinese.

== Economy during Japanese occupation ==
Under the Manchukuo period, Xing'an was primarily an agricultural area, with food grains, particularly wheat, soy and corn, as well as cattle, sheep, horse and other livestock. The primary economic asset of Xing'an was its extensive coal deposits, primarily at Chalai Nor hill, 25 kilometers from the frontier station of Manzhouli, where 290,000 metric tonnes were extracted annually. Xing'an was also a trade zone between Manchukuo, the Soviet Union, and Soviet-dominated Mongolia.

== See also ==
- Inner Mongolia § Administrative divisions
- Hinggan League
