= 100th Anniversary of the Xinhai Revolution and Republic of China =

Centenary celebration event

100th anniversary of the Republic of China
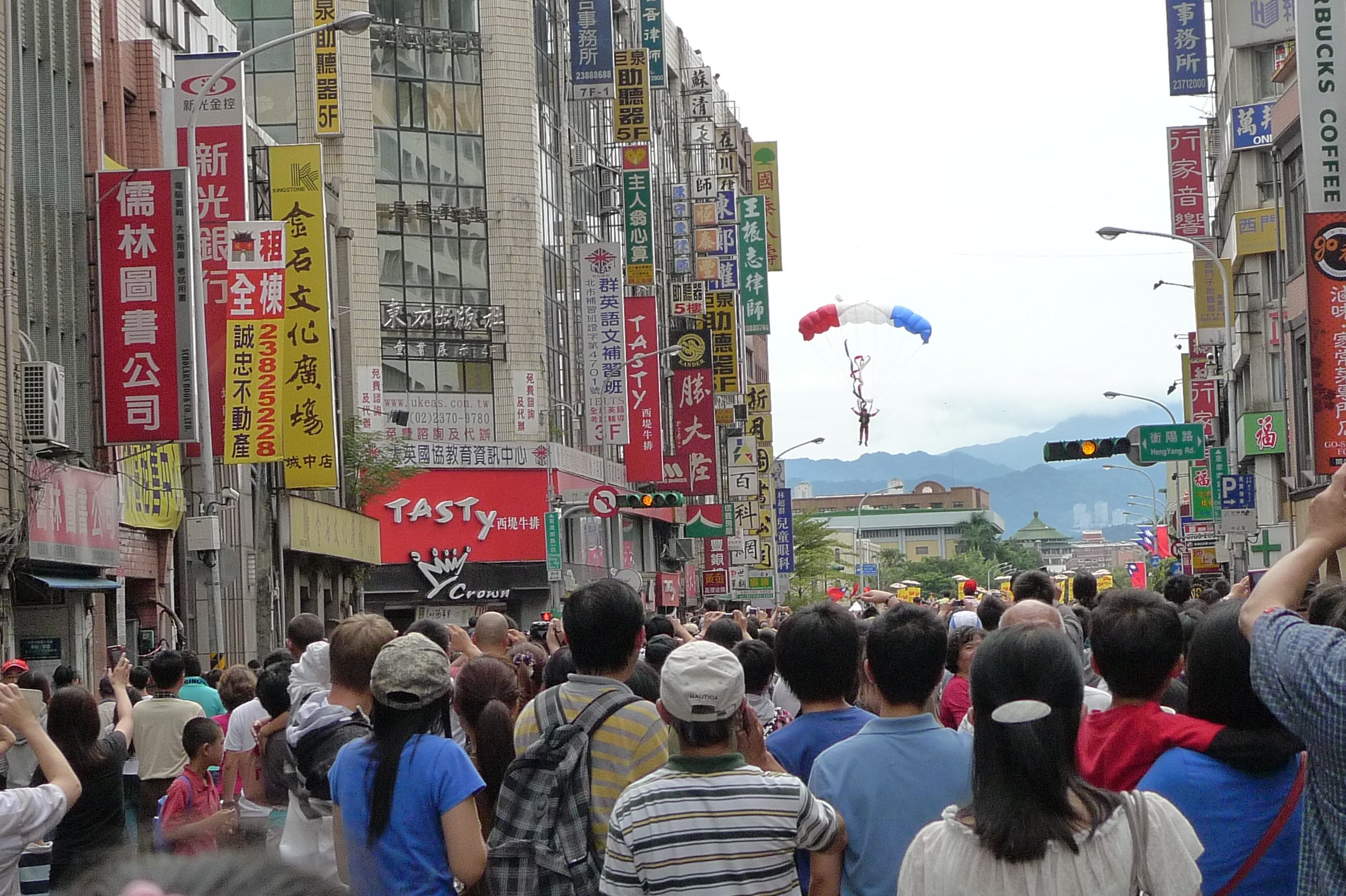
- 100th Xinhai Revolution anniversary celebration in Taiwan as national day
- Date: 10 October 2011
- Also known as: 中華民國100年國慶
- Website: ROC Centenary Foundation

Celebrations of the 100th anniversary of the founding of the Republic of China were held on 10 October 2011, on the 100th anniversary of the Xinhai Revolution. It was celebrated in both mainland China and Taiwan, ruled by the People's Republic of China (PRC) and the Republic of China (ROC) respectively, but the connotation and significance of the celebrations varied between the two.

== Background ==
On 10 October 1911, the Wuchang Uprising was launched as part of the Xinhai Revolution to overthrow the Manchu-led Qing, the last Chinese dynasty. This ended over 2,000 years of imperial rule and the Chinese monarchy. Since the establishment of the Republic of China (ROC) in 1912, the revolution has been celebrated on Double Ten Day. Towards the end of the Chinese Civil War, the Nationalist Kuomintang relocated to island of Taiwan, formerly a Qing prefecture that was ceded to Japan from 1895 to 1945, and the Chinese Communist Party (CCP) established the People's Republic of China (PRC) in 1949 on the mainland. In the PRC, 10 October is not formally considered the National Day, as it usually celebrates its own national day on 1 October.

== Celebration ==
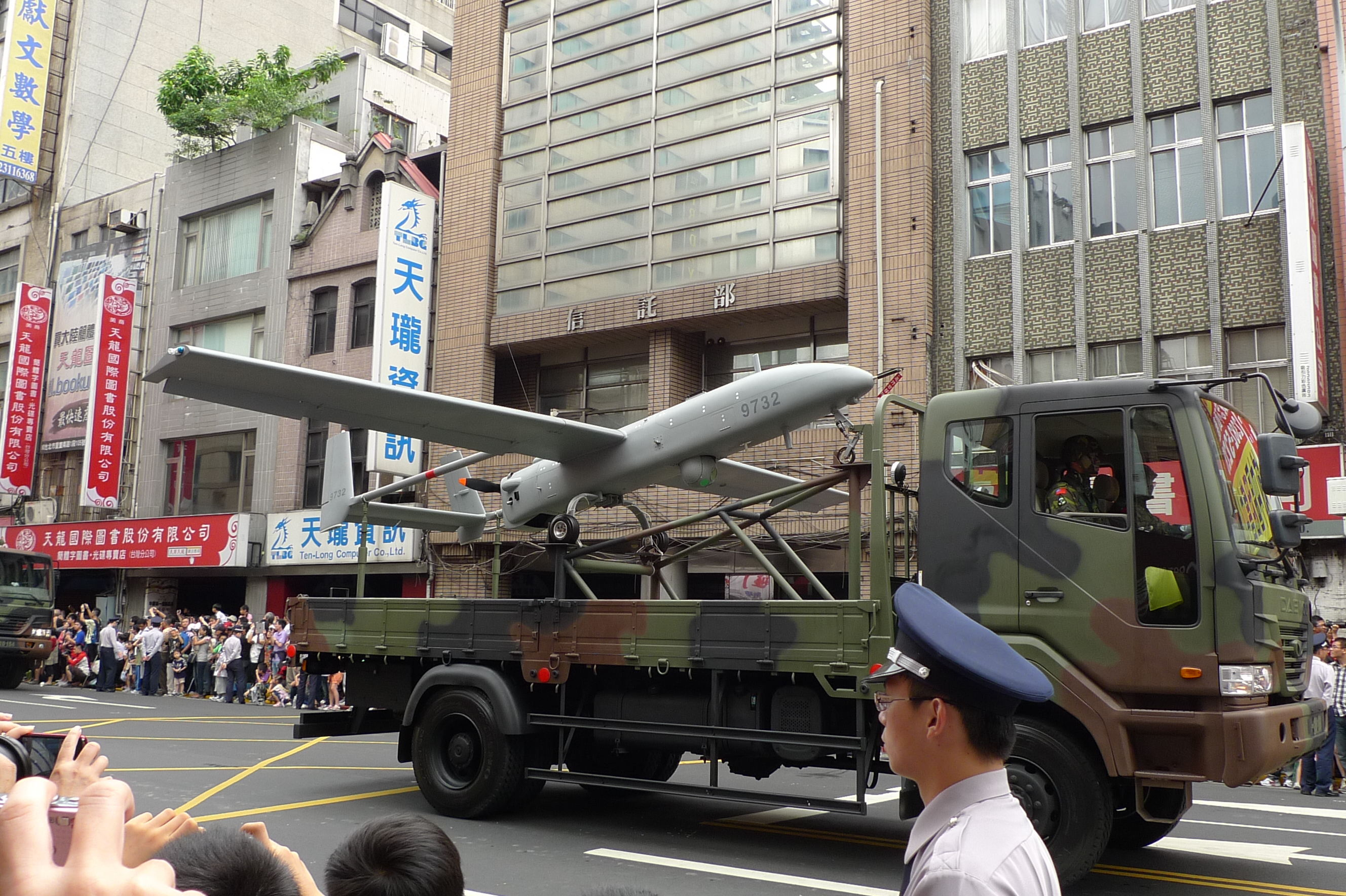
Military display at the street parades. A sample of UAV.

=== Taiwan ===
On New Year's Eve 2011, a large celebration took place at Keelung River. About 850,000 people celebrated at Xinyi District including NT$60 million worth of fireworks.

The official Double Ten Day ceremony began on the morning of 10 October 2011 when a flag raising ceremony was held. Subsequent activities followed, including a military parade involving more than 1,000 military personnel, 71 aircraft and 168 vehicles. The personnel number is however much smaller than celebrations in the past. The slogan of the ceremony is "Republic of China, Splendid 100" (中華民國，精彩一百).

President Ma Ying-jeou made a National Day address to the nation. He urged Beijing to pursue democracy and "face the existence of the Republic of China". Over 50 delegations and 1,500 distinguished guests representing ROC's diplomatic allies visited Taiwan during the celebration. Many notables including US Defense Secretary Donald Rumsfeld, Japanese Prime Minister Taro Aso and Lithuanian President Valdas Adamkus were in attendance. Japan sent a delegation with record setting numbers.

There were also 5634 people who reportedly married exactly on the 100th anniversary of the Xinhai Revolution, at 10 minutes to 10 am on 10 October. This is double 2010 and 18 times more than the average day.

=== Mainland China ===
The 100th anniversary ceremony was held at the Great Hall of the People in Beijing. The event was attended by all nine members of the CCP Politburo Standing Committee of the Central Committee. The event was attended by CCP general secretary Hu Jintao as well as former leader Jiang Zemin. Hu gave a 20-minute speech that emphasized Chinese unification. The ceremony then lasted 40 minutes featuring a giant portrait of Sun Yat-sen supported by 10 PRC flags.

In Wuhan, the government officials spent 43 million yuan in restoring three 1911 heritage sites, but they were careful in not letting the celebration outshine the 90th anniversary of the Chinese Communist Party that took place in July. In addition, from 27 August to 10 October, Wuhan's security forces were supported with thousands of officers including 100 paramilitary police and 200 special police armed with submachine guns on street duty with 250,000 surveillance cameras. The celebration is referred to as "100th anniversary of Xinhai Revolution". Since January 2011, Guangzhou has held its own celebrations to commemorate the Guangzhou uprisings. At the Guangdong Museum of Revolutionary History separate celebrations were held in October 2011. In the PRC, the event is generally not referred to as the "100th anniversary of the Republic of China", but as the "100th anniversary of Xinhai Revolution".

== Culture ==
In 2010, one of the main anniversary events was to make a film on the life of Sun Yat-sen shot in places where he lived and worked, including Britain, Singapore, Japan and Hawaii. The government provided NT$20 million for the film. Movies such as 1911 were also made for the 100th anniversary. The Discovery Channel and the ROC aligned for a three-part special show. In Macau, a tour of Sun Yat-sen's revolutionary trail was launched for the 100th anniversary. Hong Kong Post also launched Centenary Xinhai Revolution stamps.

== Additional responses ==
=== Taiwan green-camp and aboriginal responses ===
Keynotes made by Hu Jintao were interpreted by members of the Taiwan independence movement as exploiting the image of Sun Yat-sen to intensify measures against the movement. Taiwan aboriginal rights activists of the Sediq National Assembly who represent the Atayal people announced a headhunt against the ROC government. The headhunts usually get rid of evil spirits. The activists compared the ROC government to the Japanese colonial government that preceded it which took their people's land and resources. The Indigeonous People's Coalition said there is nothing to celebrate as the aboriginals have suffered under the government. They performed their own mgaya ceremony. Some have said the ROC government is a "Chinese government in exile" and should get out of Taiwan. However, Pan-green DPP candidate Tsai Ing-wen famously said "The ROC is Taiwan, Taiwan is the ROC" for the first time in her career.

=== Bans and censorships ===
In April 2011, an inter-university debate related to Sun Yat-sen was supposed to be hosted by the Beijing Institute of Technology, but it was banned by the university's Communist Youth League. The Dr. Sun opera about a love story between Soong Ching-ling and Sun was supposed to have a world premiere at the National Centre for Performing Arts in Beijing on 30 September. It was canceled for "logistics reasons".

== Controversy ==
=== Principles ===
Criticism was in particular directed at the PRC, saying that the government should spend more money on its poor, sick and elderly instead on the anniversary celebration. Activist Wang Dan criticized the PRC government's celebration of democracy as "ironic".

=== Anthem choice ===
During the PRC ceremony in the Great Hall of the People, only the national anthem of the People's Republic of China was played. A similar case occurred in Hong Kong during TVB's "Variety show Commemorating the Centenary of the 1911 Revolution" (百年辛亥 中華總商會111週年文藝匯演), where the PRC national anthem (which was the anthem of the Nationalist Army's 200th Division) was played in lieu of the ROC anthem.

In ROC, for the preparation of the anniversary, new songs were made and chosen to commemorate the founding of the ROC. One of the requirements was that the composer be an ROC citizen. But according to legislator Chen Ting-fei (陳亭妃), the songs available for voting may not have been from ROC citizens, as the evaluation was sloppy.

=== Slogan issues ===
The original slogan for the Pan-Blue camp was "Republic of China, Founded 100 Years" (中華民國，建國一百), but was later changed to "Republic of China, Splendid 100" (中華民國，精彩一百). The words meaning "building country" (建國) were replaced with "splendid" (精彩).

=== Nomenclature impasse ===
In 2009, amid planning for the celebrations, Beijing suggested that the PRC and ROC hold joint centennial celebrations, on the condition that the term "Republic of China" not be used. President Ma Ying-jeou rejected the idea.

== See also ==
- 60th anniversary of the People's Republic of China
