= Site of the First National Congress of the Kuomintang =

Building in Guangzhou, China

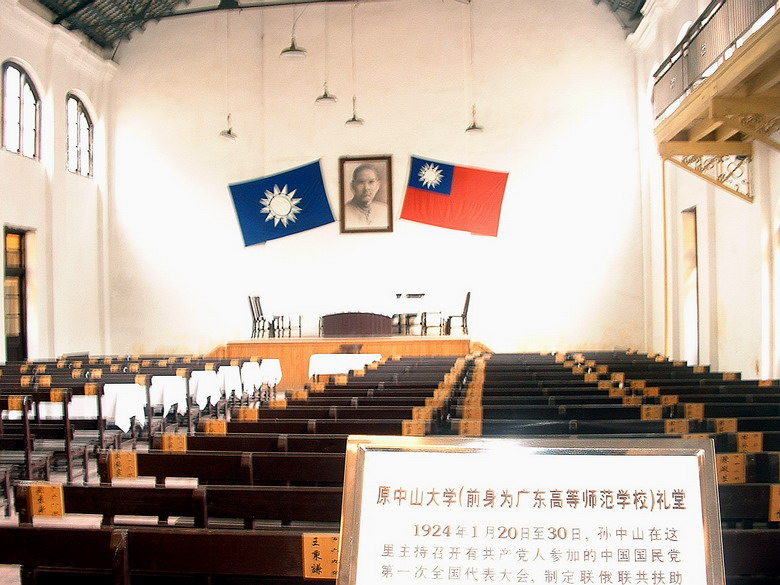
Venue for the 1st National Congress of Kuomintang

The Site of the First National Congress of the Kuomintang (simplified Chinese: 中国国民党第一次全国代表大会旧址; traditional Chinese: 中國國民黨第一次全國代表大會舊址; pinyin: Zhōngguó Guómíndǎng Dìyīcì Quánguó Dàibiǎo Dàhuì Jiùzhǐ) is the Clock Building on Wenming Road, Yuexiu District, Guangzhou. The First National Congress of the Chinese Kuomintang was held in the auditorium of the building from January 20 to 30, 1924. The Luxun Memorial Hall is also located here. This place is now a national key cultural relic protection site.

== History ==
The site of the First National Congress of the Kuomintang was originally the Clock Building of Guangdong Higher Normal School, formally the Guangdong and Guangxi Excellent Normal School, which was built in 1905 on the site of the Guangdong Imperial Examination Hall of the Qing Dynasty. The building covers an area of 2,600 square meters, and is in a brick-and-wood structure with an arched colonnade at the front entrance, imitating the Roman classical style. There are four parts: a meeting hall (the auditorium), exhibition halls, offices, and a clock tower. The front half of the building has two floors and the back half has one floor. It looks like in the shape of Chinese character "山" (mountain), with a tower in the middle. Because clocks were installed on all the four sides of the tower of the building, they are called the "Clock Tower" and "Clock Building" respectively.

The first National Congress of the Kuomintang was held in the auditorium of the Clock Building from January 20 to 30, 1924. Sun Yat-sen presided over the congress here, reorganizing Kuomintang and re-explainting the Isms of Democracy, Civil Rights and people's livelihood. The Constitution of the Koumintang was adopted here. It is the place for the first cooperation between Chinese Kuomintang and Chinese Communist Party. Those attending the meeting included Kuomintang members such as Sun Yat-sen, Liao Zhongkai, and Wang Jingwei, as well as cross-party Communists such as Li Dazhao and Mao Zedong.

In later 1924, Sun Yat-sen established the National Guangdong University here, which was later changed to the National Sun Yat-sen University, and the Clock Building served as the headquarters. In 1933, after the new campus of National Sun Yat-sen University was completed at Wushan, Shipai, outside the city (now the Wushan Campus of South China University of Technology and South China Agricultural University), the old campus on Wenming Road was used together with the new campus.

After the reorganization of higher education in 1952, Sun Yat-sen University was moved to the former Lingnan University campus (located in Kangleyuan, Henan, Guangzhou, now part of Haizhu District). The old campus on Wenming Road was used by the Guangdong Provincial Department of Culture and was later converted into the Guangdong Provincial Museum and Guangdong Provincial Sun Yat-sen Library.

In January 1988, the old site was enlisted in the third batch of National priority protected sites.

On July 13, 2008, the Kaohsiung City Council and a delegation from various sectors visited Guangzhou to pay homage to the former site of the First National Congress of the Kuomintang. They were warmly welcomed by their hosts of Guangzhou, who presented a pair of white tigers to Kaohsiung. They all wished to put aside disputes, develop economy, and benefit compatriots in both mainland and Taiwan.

The site of the First National Congress of the Kuomintang and the Lu Xun Memorial Hall were closed for maintenance in 2010, and reopened on November 12, 2016, the 150th anniversary of Sun Yat-sen's birth.

== Present status ==
The site of the First National Congress of the Kuomintang is located at the Clock Building on Wenming Road, Yuexiu District, Guangzhou, on the east side of the Sun Yat-sen Library of Guangdong Province. It is now a national key cultural relic protection site, covering an area of 2,600 square meters, and consists of the meeting hall, exhibition halls, offices and the clock tower. The meeting hall is restored to its original state during the conference, with a portrait of Sun Yat-sen in the middle of the rostrum, the Kuomintang flag on the left and the Republic of China flag on the right. The seats below the rostrum are all labeled with the numbers and names of the people attending the meeting.

There is a wide square in front of the building, covering an area of 17,460 square meters, with a large lawn in the middle. During the period of Northern Expedition, this place was an important venue for revolutionary gatherings.

== Lu Xun Memorial Hall ==
The Guangzhou Luxun Memorial Hall is also located in the Clock Building and is under the management of the Guangdong Provincial Museum.

On January 18, 1927, Lu Xun was invited to move from the private Xiamen University to the National Sun Yat-sen University as the Dean of Liberal Arts and Dean of Academic Affairs. He lived here in the Clock Building before moving to Baiyun Building on March 29. In 1957, the site was established as the Guangzhou Lu Xun Memorial Hall. In 1995, it was announced among the second list of patriotism education bases.

The museum has a restored exhibition room of Lu Xun's residence at that time, as well as displays of Lu Xun's manuscripts and cultural relics. There are also furnishings from Lu Xun’s lifetime, displaying some old items of Lu Xun when at National Sun Yat-sen University, as well as publications and photos of Lu Xun and Xu Guangping from different periods.

== Gallery ==
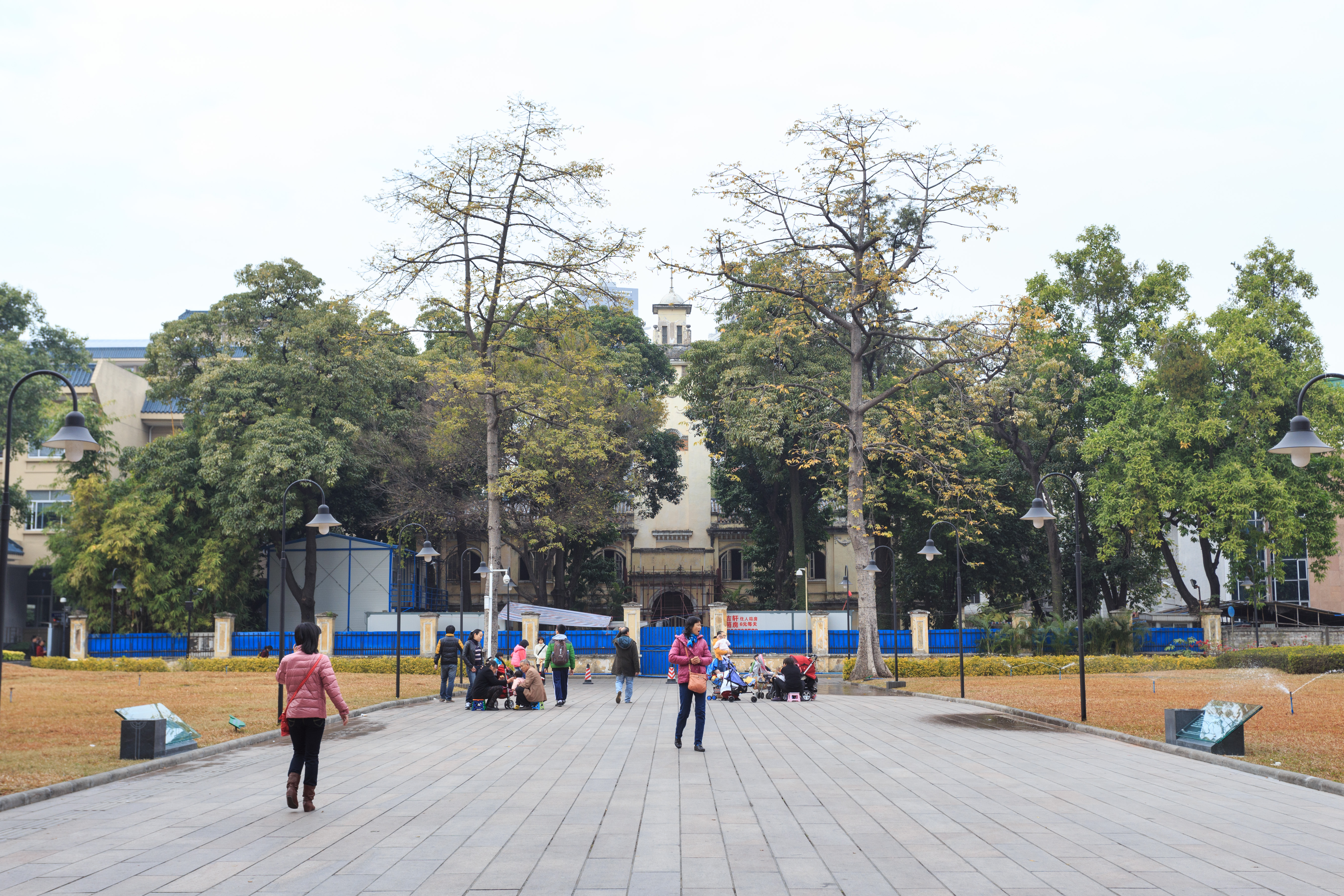
Panoramic

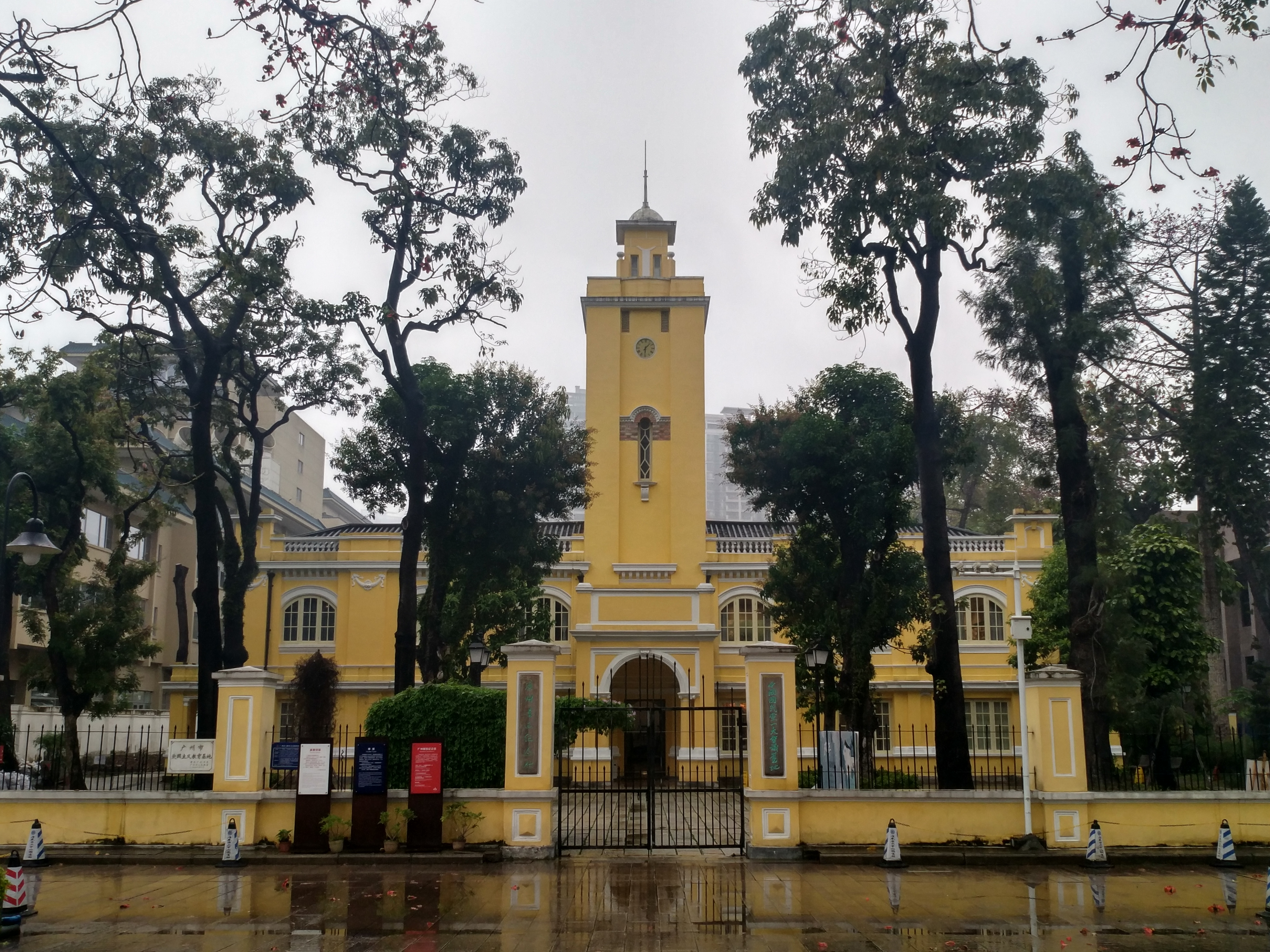
Gate

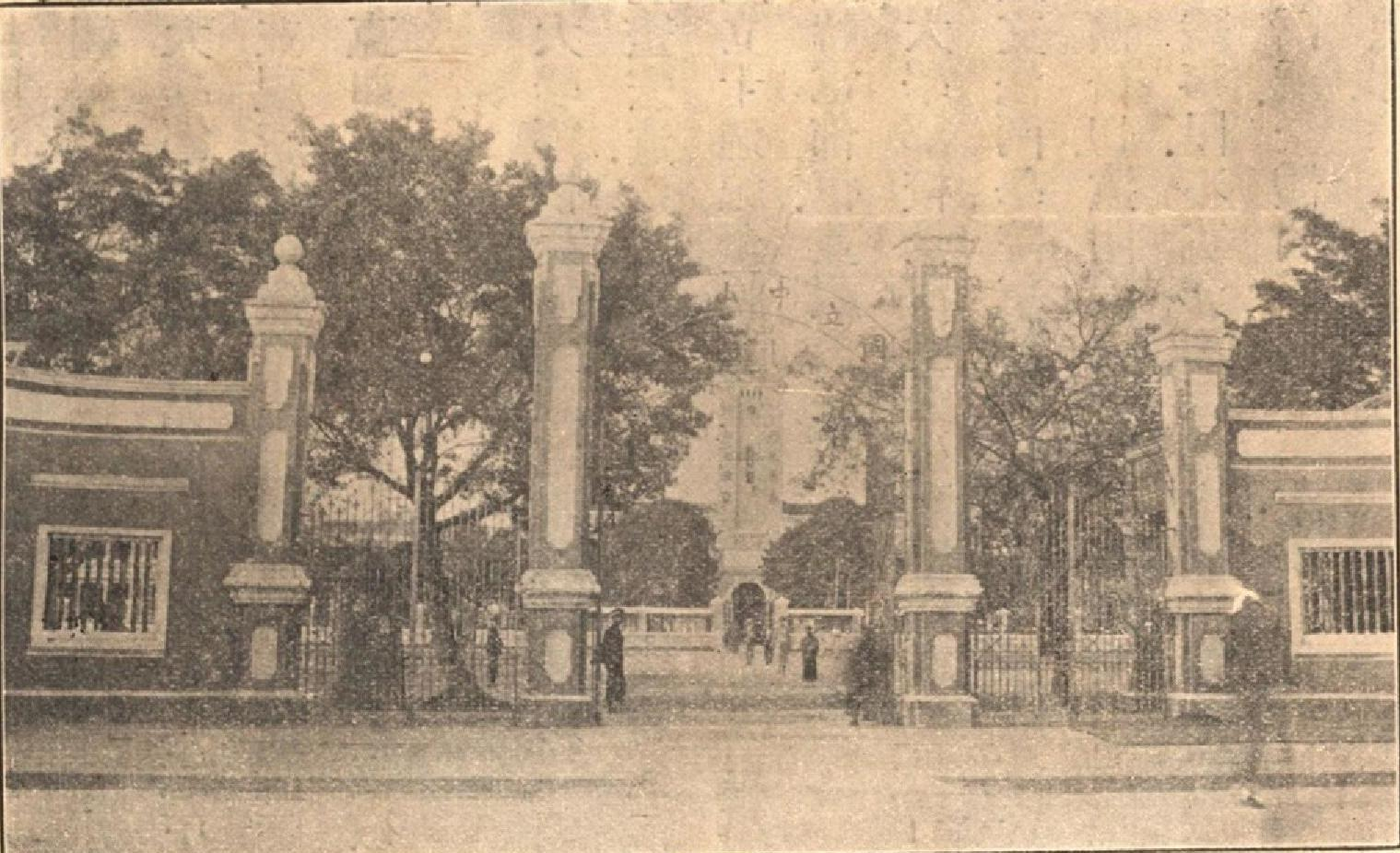
The main gate of National Sun Yat-sen University

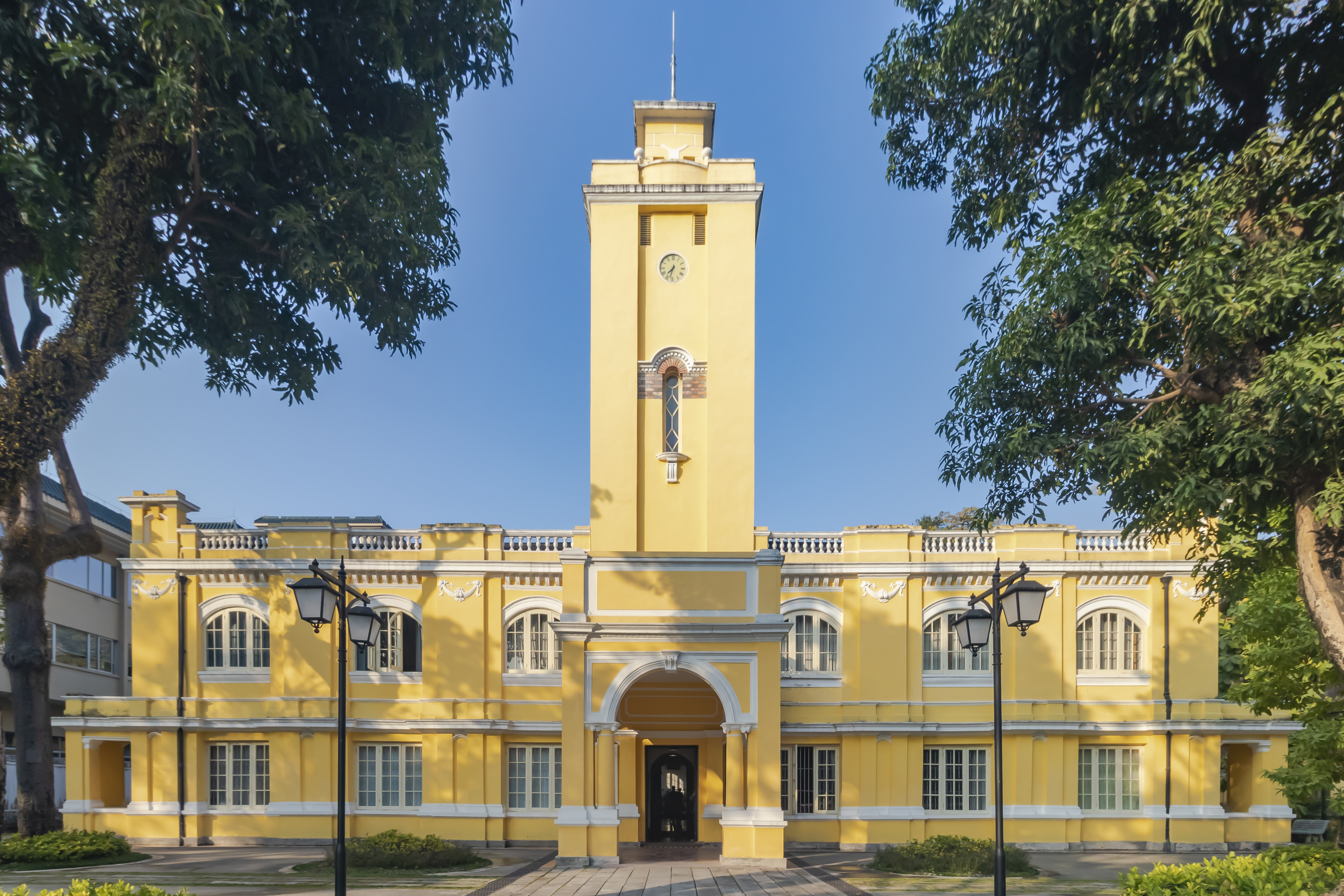
Front of the Bell Building with the Bell Tower

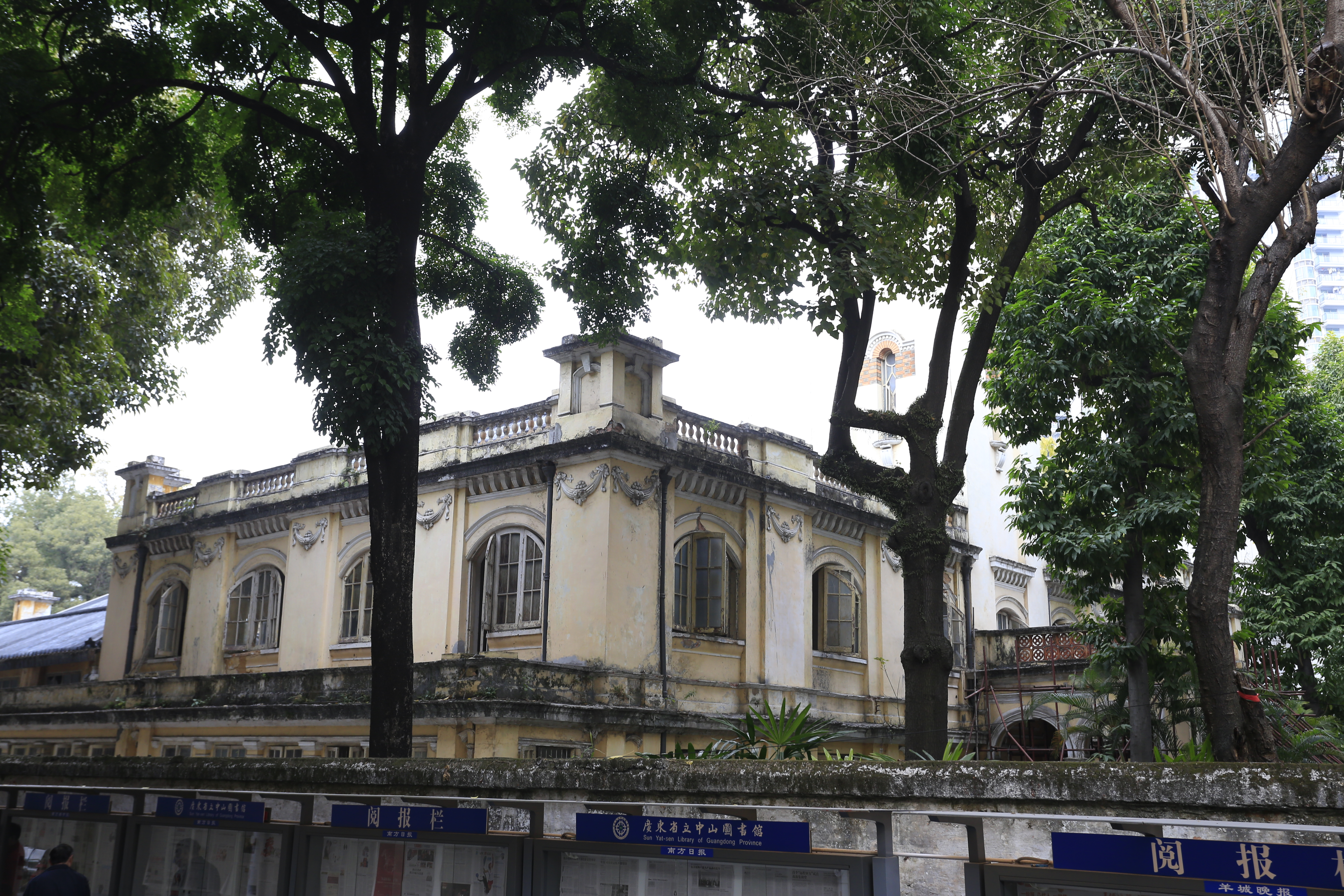
Side

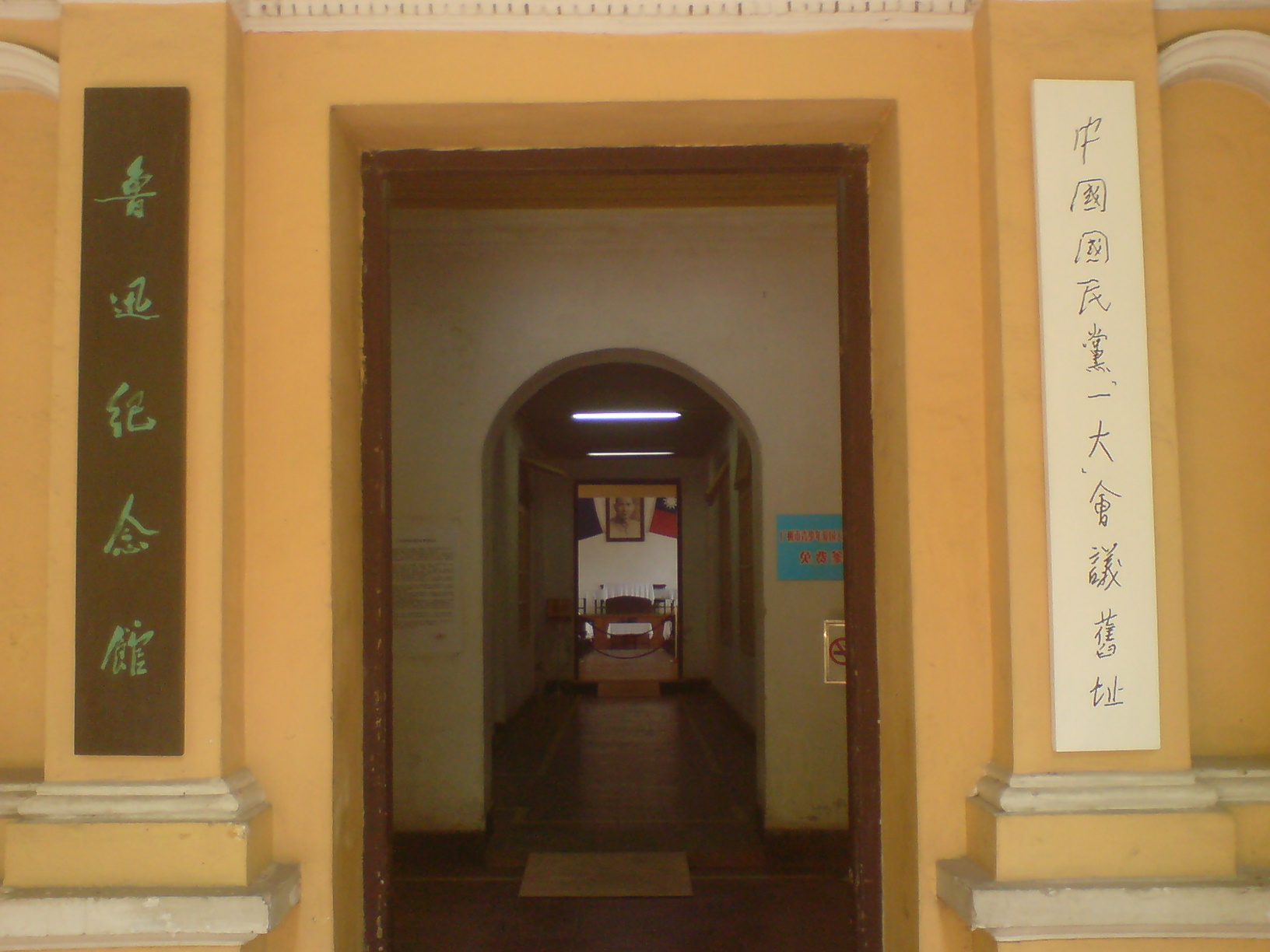
There are two plaques at the entrance of the Clock Building, one for the Lu Xun Memorial Hall and the other for the Site of the First National Congress of the Kuomintang.

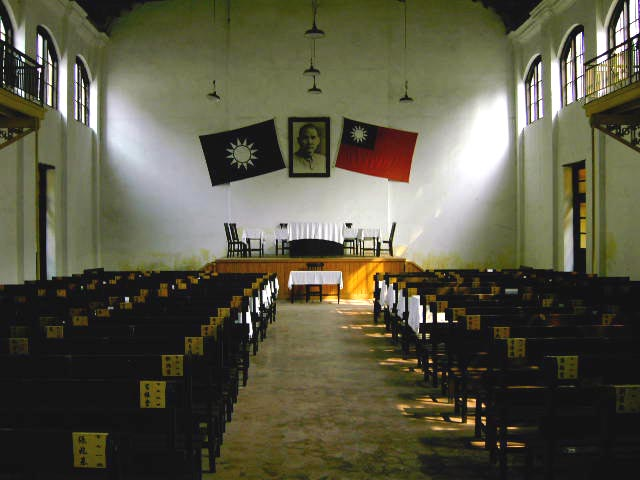
Meeting Hall

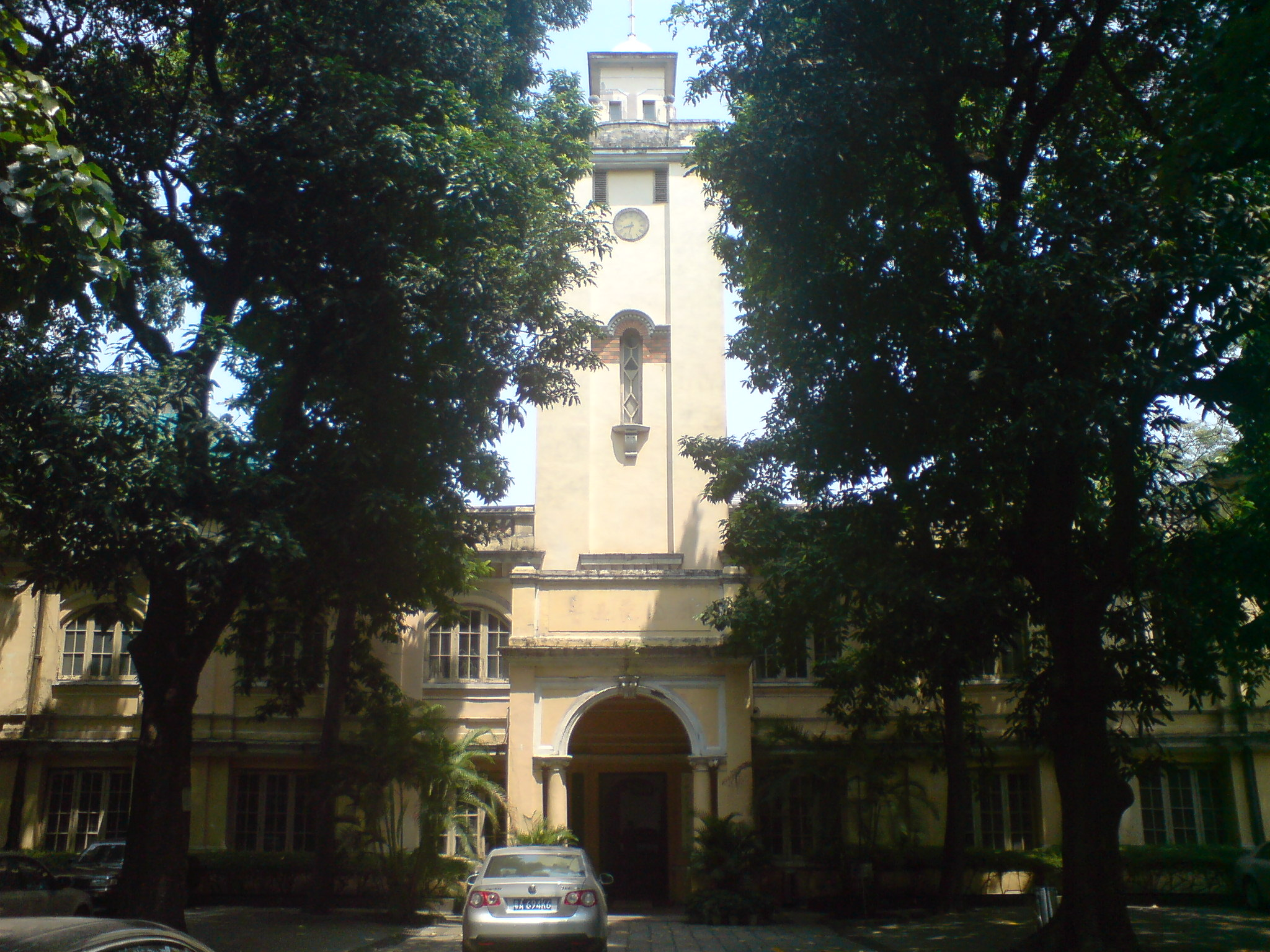
Clock Building

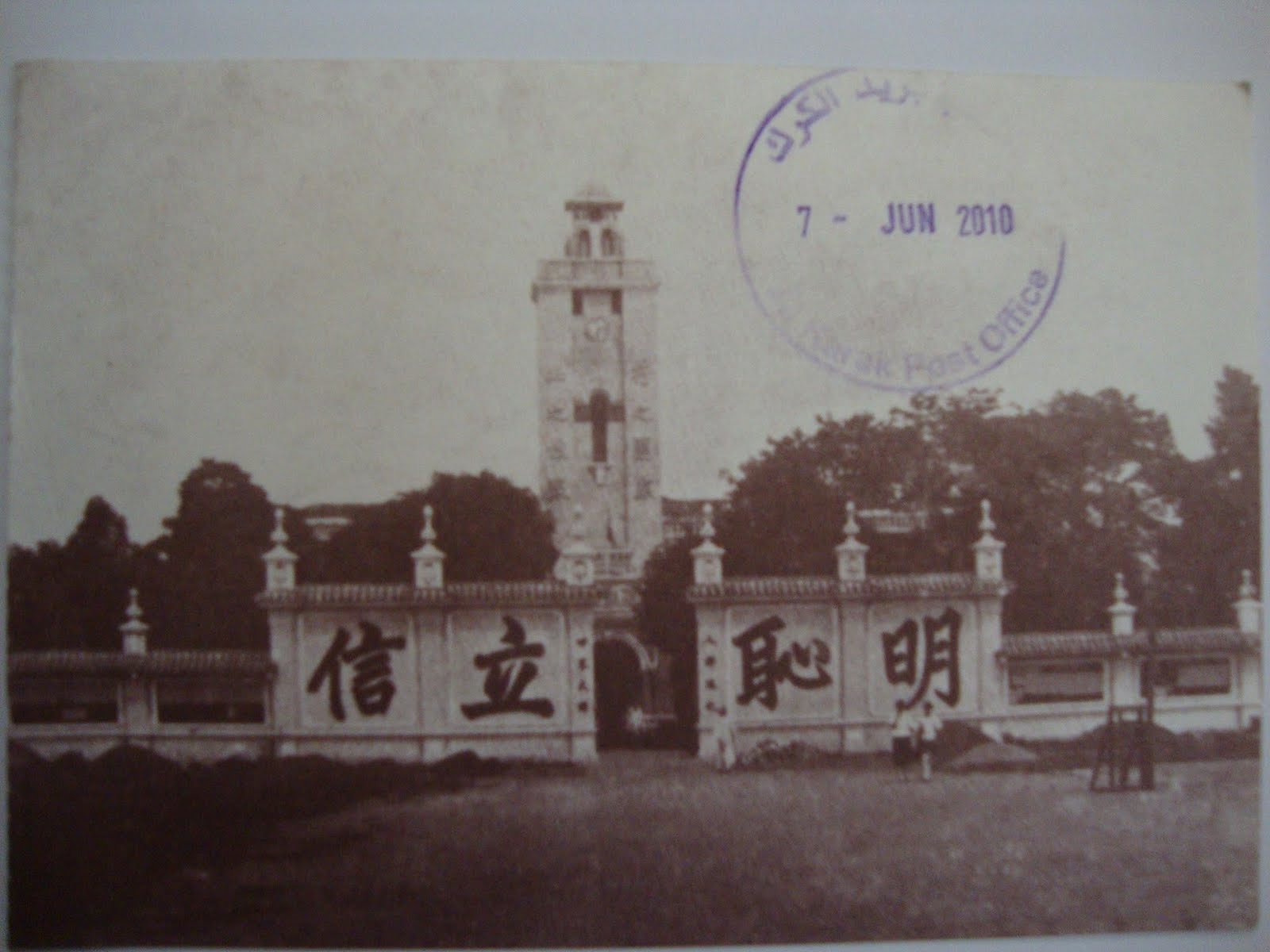
Clock Building of the National Sun Yat-sen University

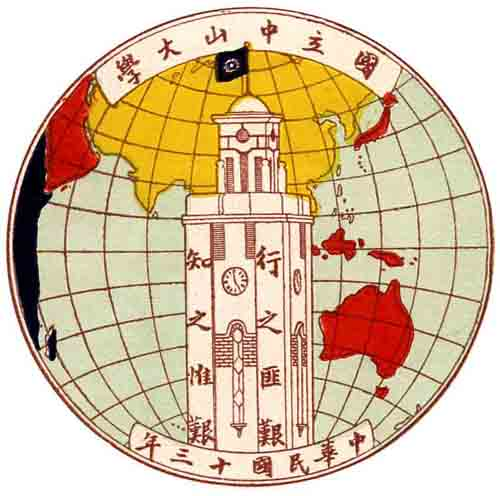
National Sun Yat-sen University emblem

== See also ==
- 1st National Congress of the Kuomintang
- Guangdong Museum of Revolutionary History
- Site of the First National Congress of the Chinese Communist Party
