= National Day of the Republic of China =

National holiday in Taiwan

- A combination of two 十 ('ten') characters, often seen during the holiday
- Also called: Double Tenth Day, Double Ten Day, Anniversary of the Xinhai Revolution, Taiwan National Day
- Observed by: Republic of China (as National Day or Double Ten Day); People's Republic of China (as the Anniversary of the Xinhai Revolution)
- Type: Historical, cultural, nationalist
- Celebrations: festivities, including fireworks and concerts
- Date: 10 October
- Next time: 10 October 2026
- Frequency: annual
- First time: 10 October 1912
- Related to: 1911 Revolution

Chinese name
- Traditional Chinese: 國慶日
- Simplified Chinese: 国庆日
Transcriptions
Standard Mandarin
- Hanyu Pinyin: Guóqìng Rì
- Bopomofo: ㄍㄨㄛˊ ㄑㄧㄥˋ ㄖˋ
Southern Min
- Hokkien POJ: Kok-khèng-ji̍t

Double Ten Day
- Traditional Chinese: 雙十節
- Simplified Chinese: 双十节
Transcriptions
Standard Mandarin
- Hanyu Pinyin: Shuāngshí Jié
- Bopomofo: ㄕㄨㄤˉ ㄕˊ ㄐㄧㄝˊ
Southern Min
- Hokkien POJ: Siang-si̍p-chiat

The National Day of the Republic of China, also referred to as Double Ten Day or Double Tenth Day, is a public holiday on 10 October, now held annually as national day in the Republic of China (ROC, commonly known as Taiwan). It commemorates the start of the Wuchang Uprising on 10 October 1911 which ultimately led to the establishment of the Republic of China on 1 January 1912, and the collapse of the imperial Qing dynasty, ending 2,133 years of imperial rule of China since the Qin dynasty. The day was once held as a public holiday in mainland China during the Mainland Period of the ROC before 1949. The subsequent People's Republic of China continues to observe the Anniversary of the Xinhai Revolution on the same date but not as a public holiday and places more emphasis on its revolutionary characteristics as a commemoration of a historical event rather than celebrating it as the founding of the Republic of China.

Following the consequence of the Chinese Civil War, the ROC government lost control of mainland China to the Chinese Communist Party and retreated to the island of Taiwan in December 1949. The National Day is now mainly celebrated in the Taiwan Area, thus the name "Taiwan National Day" is also used by some groups, but it is also celebrated by many overseas Chinese communities.

== Names ==
Double Ten Day can be referred to variety of names such as the National Day of China or Chinese National Day when the ROC was in power in mainland China and as the internationally recognized government of "China" until the 1970s. Another name Taiwan National Day, is also used but in dispute as the ROC was founded in 1912, contemporarily Taiwan was ruled by the Empire of Japan. The name "Taiwan National Day" has been criticized by former ROC president Ma Ying-jeou.

== Celebration in Taiwan ==
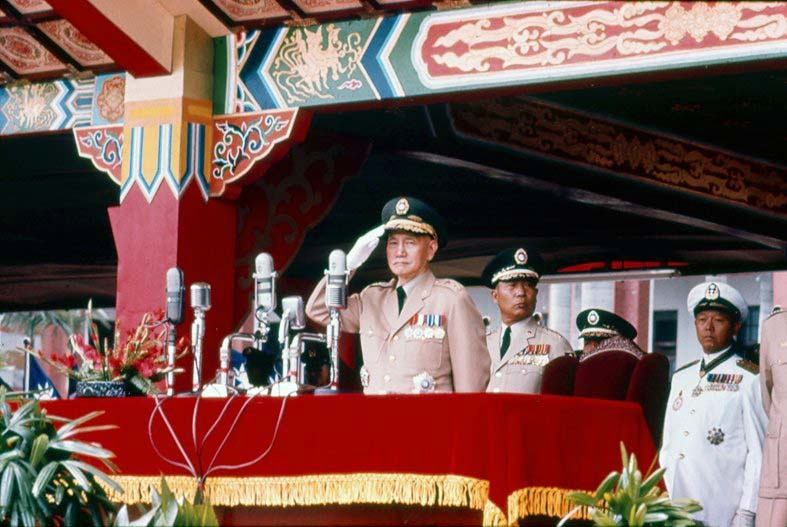
Generalissimo and former president Chiang Kai-shek presiding over the 1966 Double Ten celebrations.

The first official Double Tenth Day celebration in Taiwan, 1945

=== National Day Preparatory Committee ===
During the establishment of the Republic of China, Taiwan and Penghu were under Japanese rule, which began in 1895. In 1945, after surrender of the Empire of Japan in World War II, Taiwan and Penghu were placed under the control of the ROC.

In Taiwan, the official celebration begins with the raising of the flag of the Republic of China in front of the Presidential Office Building, along with a public singing of the National Anthem of the Republic of China. It is then followed by celebrations in front of the Presidential Office Building; from time to time, a military parade may occur. Festivities also include many aspects of traditional Chinese and/or Taiwanese culture, such as the lion dance and drum teams, and cultural features coming from Taiwanese aborigines are integrated into the display in recent years. Later in the day, the president of the Republic of China would address the country and fireworks displays are held throughout the major cities of the island. In 2009, all government sponsored festivities for the Double Ten Day were cancelled, and the money intended for the festivals (NT$70 million) were reallocated for reconstruction of the damage done by Typhoon Morakot.

In 2022 former President Ma Ying-jeou, who opposes the styling of the holiday as Taiwan National Day, publicly called for current President Tsai Ing-wen to stop using the name Taiwan National Day in material associated with the holiday. His view was criticized by Robert Tsao as obsolete.

Because of the lack of direct relations between the origin of the holiday and Taiwan in modern Taiwan the holiday is widely believed to be slightly absurd but is still widely celebrated.

=== National Day Military Parade ===
National Day (Double Ten) celebration parades

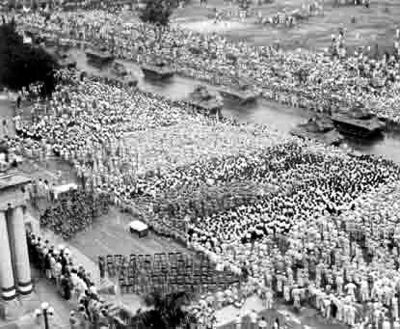
1950

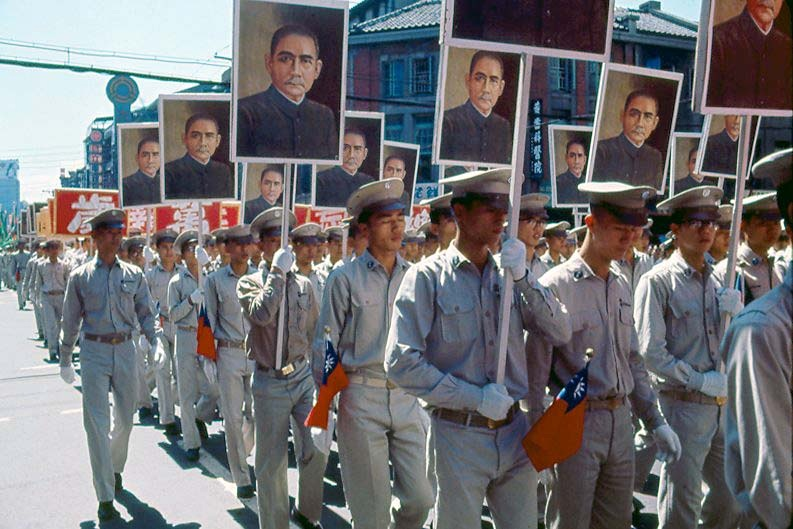
1965: Students holding Sun Yat-sen placards

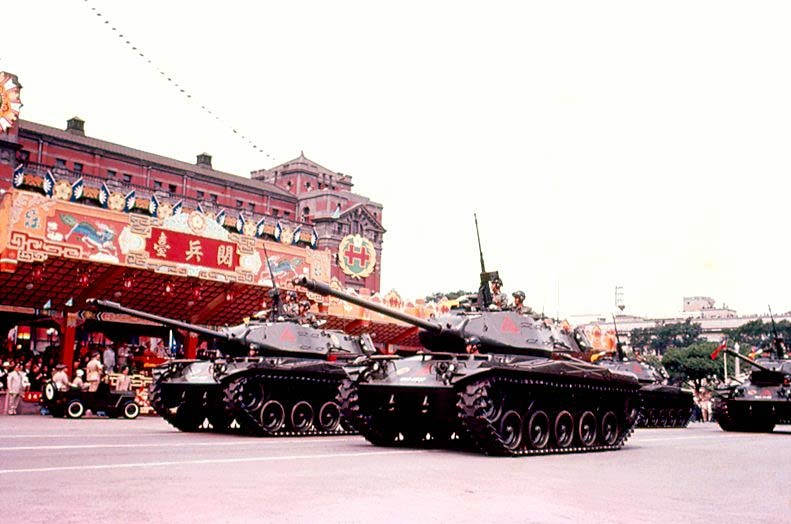
1966: Republic of China Army M41 light tanks parade in front of the Presidential Office

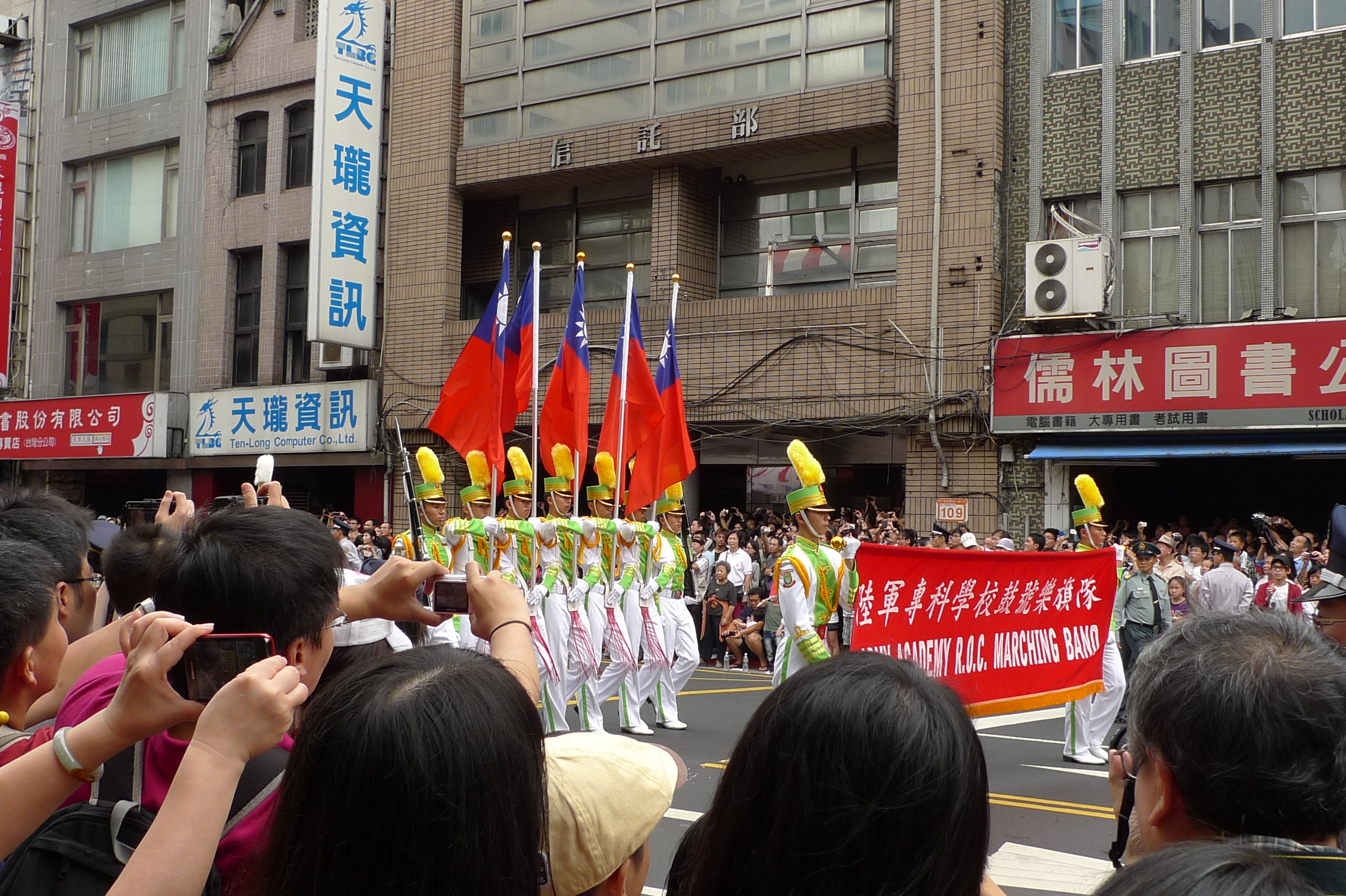
2011: Marching cadets from the ROC Military Academy

Traditionally, the Republic of China Armed Forces (ROCAF) have staged a military parade. During prior parades, troops and equipment march past a reviewing platform in front of the Presidential Office Building. Typically, foreign ambassadors, military officers, and other representatives and dignitaries are invited to view the parade. Following the National Anthem and the firing of a 21-gun salute, the parade commander, a general-ranked officer of any of the service branches of the ROCAF, would then be driven to the front of the grandstand to request permission from the President to commence the parade proper. Until 1975, the President also inspected the parade formations while riding a vehicle, as each battalion of the parade formations presented arms in the presence of the President and all the unit colours and guidons also dipped in their presence. After all the units in the ground column marched past the grandstand, they would reassemble at the center of the road for a holiday address delivered by the President to the ROCAF and the country, marking the close of the parade.

The parade has been held intermittently during the period of the Republic of China on Taiwan. The military parade on 10 October 1949, was the first public military parade held in Taiwan with Chen Cheng serving as the Grand Review Officer. The 1964 National Day parade was struck by tragedy when a low flying air force F-104 Starfighter fighter aircraft struck a Broadcasting Corporation of China tower, causing the plane's fuel tank to fall and kill three people including a woman and her baby in front of the Central Weather Bureau building in downtown Taipei. The other two remaining F-104 aircraft were ordered to look for the crashed aircraft and accidentally collided and crashed in Tucheng City, Taipei County (now New Taipei City), killing both pilots. The parade was not held again until 1971 (the 60th anniversary), while the mobile column and flypast segments returned in 1975. When Chen Shui-bian became president, the parade was not held until 2007 and then it was entitled a "Celebration Drill" and not a traditional military parade. Since Ma Ying-jeou became president, one parade has been held on the centenary celebrations of the Double Tenth Day, and another on the 105th, the only one under Tsai Ing-wen's presidency.

The tradition of shouting "Long live the Republic of China!" (中華民國萬歲; Zhonghua Mingguo Wansui!) at the end of the addresses by the president of the Republic of China was not held for the first time in 2016. It was also the very year that fire and police services joined the parade for the first time in history, breaking the tradition of an exclusively-military parade to include personnel from civil uniformed services.

List of Republic of China National Day Parades
Parade Year	Exercise Name	Grand Review Officer	Venue	Parade Commander	Number of Troops	Remarks
1949	—N/a	Chen Cheng	Taipei	Unknown		First military parade held in Taiwan under the control of the Republic of China.
1951	—N/a	Chiang Kai-shek	Taipei	Ai Ai		ROC Fortieth Anniversary
1952	復華演習	Chiang Kai-shek	Taipei	Tang Shou-chi	10,046	
1953	—N/a	Chiang Kai-shek	Taipei	Zhou Yuhuan	19,000	
1954	—N/a	Chiang Kai-shek	Taipei	Xu Rucheng		Flyby aircraft was requisitioned for the defense of Quemoy during the First Taiwan Strait Crisis
1955	光華演習	Chiang Kai-shek	Taipei	Cheng Wei-yuan		
1956	光復演習	Chiang Kai-shek	Taipei	Liu Dinghan	21,500	
1957	中興演習	Chiang Kai-shek	Taipei	Hu Xin	12,000	
1960	鼎興演習	Chiang Kai-shek	Taipei	Chu Yuan-Cong		
1961	復興演習	Chiang Kai-shek	Taipei	Cheng Wei-yuan		ROC Fiftieth Anniversary (Golden Jubilee)
~~1962~~	復華演習		Taipei			Cancelled on September 11, 1962
1963	復漢演習	Chiang Kai-shek	Taipei	Yuan Guo-Zheng	15,370	
1964	興漢演習	Chiang Kai-shek	Taipei	Hau Pei-tsun		Two F-104 aircraft collided after an air formation, killing both pilots
1971		Chiang Kai-shek	Taipei			First parade after 6 years absence, marked the 60th Anniversary of the ROC, ground column only present
1975	大漢演習	Yen Chia-kan	Taipei	Zhang Jiajun		Full remastered video of 1975 National Day parade
1978	漢威演習	Chiang Ching-kuo	Taipei	Chiang Chung-ling		Flypast cancelled due to rainy weather
1979		Chiang Ching-kuo	Taipei			Ground column only present, air flypast and military mobile column cancelled Full video of 1979 National Day parade
1980		Chiang Ching-kuo	Taipei			
1981	漢武演習	Chiang Ching-kuo	Taipei	Hsu Li-nung	11,966	ROC Seventieth Anniversary (Part 1) (Part 2) (Part 3) (Part 4) (Part 5) (Part 6)
1982		Chiang Ching-kuo	Taipei			
1986		Chiang Ching-kuo	Taipei			ROC Seventy-Fifth Anniversary (Diamond Jubilee)
1987	僑泰演習	Chiang Ching-kuo	Taipei			It was the last military parade held during Chiang Ching-kuo's administration. It was held on 11 October, the day after the Double Ten Day celebrations due to Chiang's ailing condition. (Also the first since the abolition of Martial Law in Taiwan earlier that July.)
1988	光武演習	Lee Teng-hui	Taipei	Chen Tingchong	13,166	ROC Seventy-Seventh Anniversary (Part 1) (Part 2) (Part 3) (Part 4)
1991	華統演習	Lee Teng-hui	Taipei	Ro Wenshan	12,566	ROC Eightieth Anniversary (Part 1) (Part 2) (Part 3) (Part 4)
2007	同慶操演	Chen Shui-bian	Taipei	Wu Sihuai	3,000	Exhibitions presented on national defense, non-traditional military parade
2011		Ma Ying-jeou	Taipei		1,000+	The centennial event featured a skydiving show of 12 paratroopers of the Army Airborne Training Center above the plaza in front of the Presidential Office. Military parade involving 1,000+ personnel, 71 aircraft and 168 vehicles. On the part of the ground troops only the ROCAF Honor Guard Battalion and the ROCAF Composite Headquarters Band joined the parade on behalf of the armed forces.
2016	慶祥操演	Tsai Ing-wen	Taipei		2,500+	
2017		Tsai Ing-wen	Taipei			
2021		Tsai Ing-wen	Taipei			
2022		Tsai Ing-wen	Taipei			
2023		Tsai Ing-wen	Taipei			
2024		Lai Ching-te	Taipei			

=== Full order of march past for National Day Parades until 1991 ===
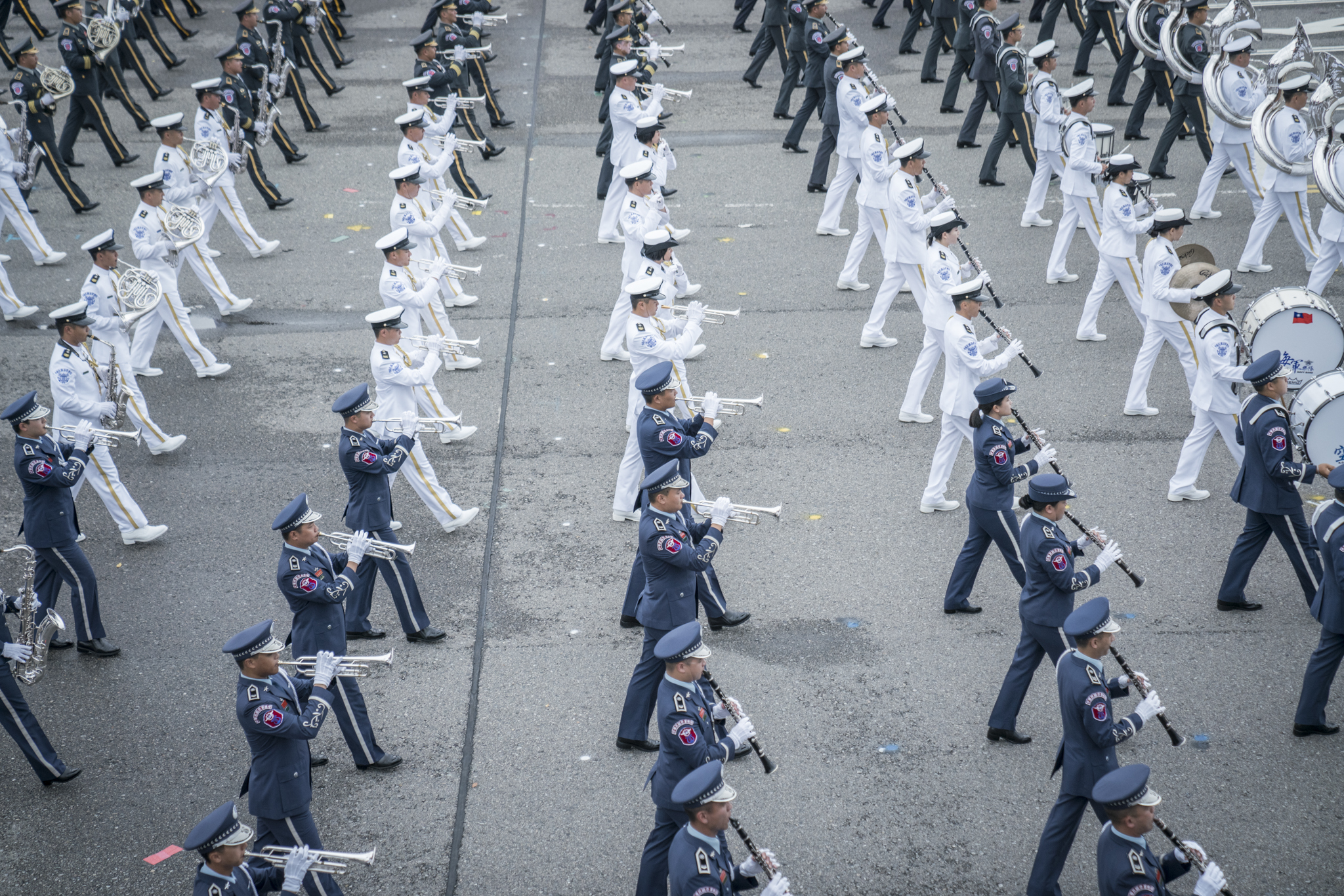
Combined ROCAF marching bands (2018)

Until 1991, following the opening report by the Parade commander, usually a lieutenant general or vice admiral of the ROCAF, the massed military bands of the ROC Armed Forces, led by the Senior Drum Major, would take their positions in the parade, playing the ROC Armed Forces March, a medley of the official songs of the service branches of the armed forces. Then the parade would march past, in the following sequence, with minor variations over the years:

==== Ground column ====
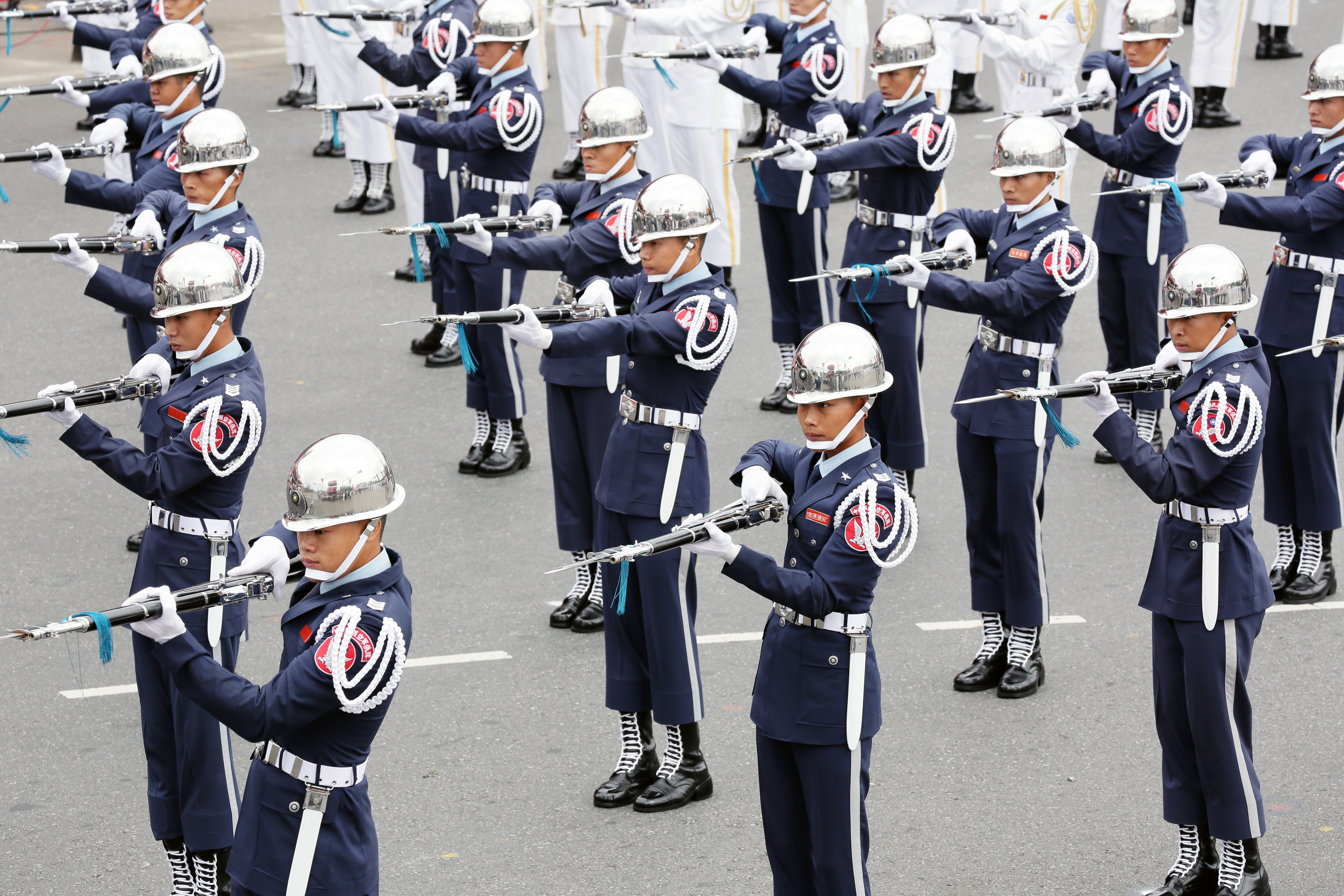
Ground column (2015)

- ROC Armed Forces Joint Honor Guard
- Parade commander and staff
- Joint Division of Armed Forces Academies
  - Republic of China Military Academy
  - Republic of China Naval Academy
  - Republic of China Air Force Academy
  - National Defense University College of Political Warfare Instruction
  - ROC Air Force Institute of Technology
  - Chung-cheng Armed Forces Preparatory School
  - Army Academy R.O.C.
- Contingent of personnel from the service branches
  - ROCA combined divisional formation
  - Composite brigade of ROCN personnel (including Republic of China Marine Corps)
  - Composite group of ROCAF ground and air defense personnel
  - Republic of China Military Police
  - Republic of China Joint Logistics Command
  - Reserve and militia formations of the Republic of China Armed Forces Reserve
- Female battalion of the College of Political Warfare Instruction
- Drum and Bugle Corps of military educational institutions
- Taiwan Police College (formed part in past parades of the 1970s and 1980s)

==== Flypast ====
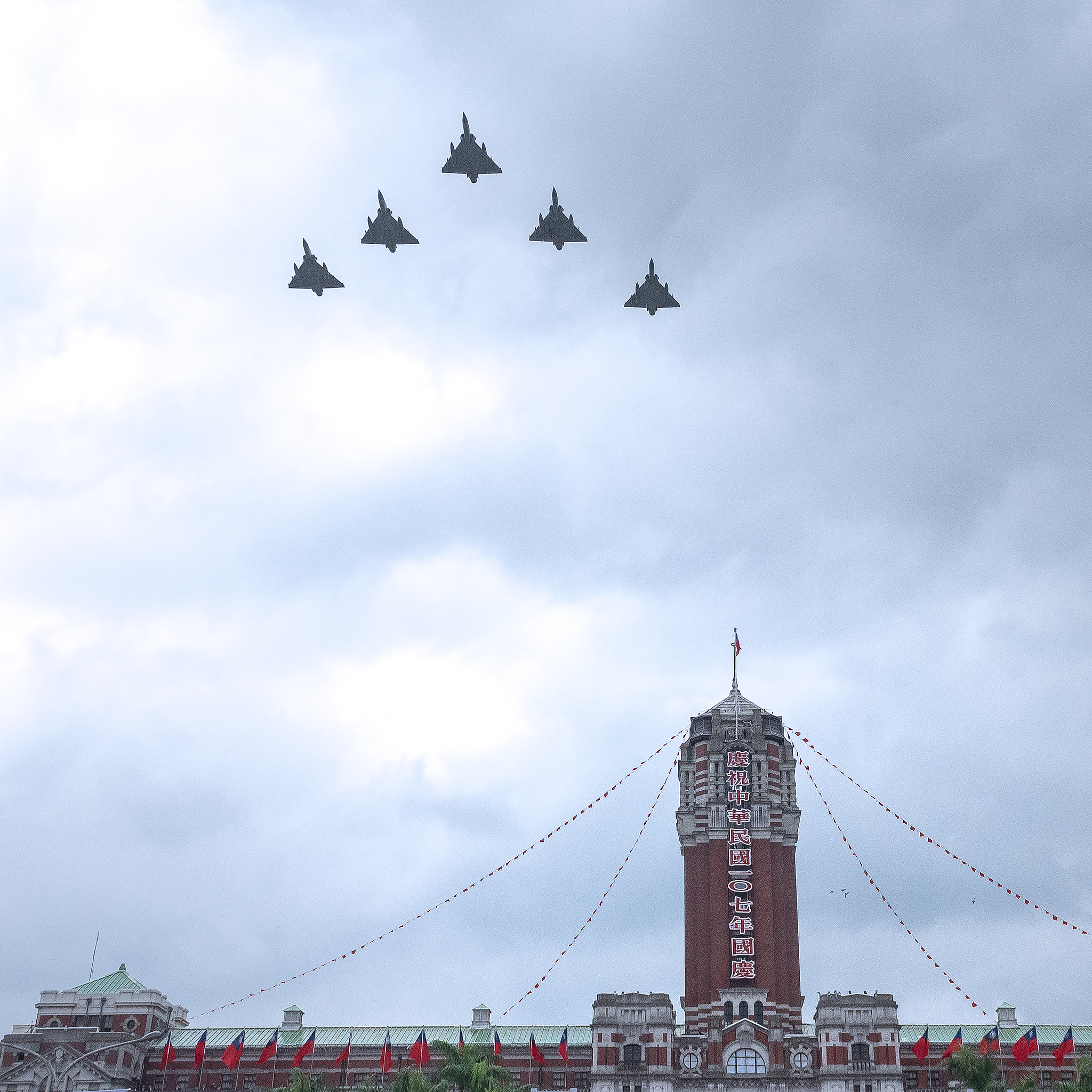
Flypast over the Presidential Office (2018)

The parade's flypast segment was for many years organized in like manner as in the Bastille Day military parade. First, while the honor guard departs from the presidential grandstand the training, fighter and transport aircraft of the ROC Air Force, the transport and anti-submarine aircraft of ROCN Naval Aviation and transport planes of ROCA Army Aviation fly past first, followed by the helicopters of all three service branches, together with those of the National Police Agency, National Fire Agency and Coast Guard Administration after the ground column segment is concluded.

==== Mobile column ====
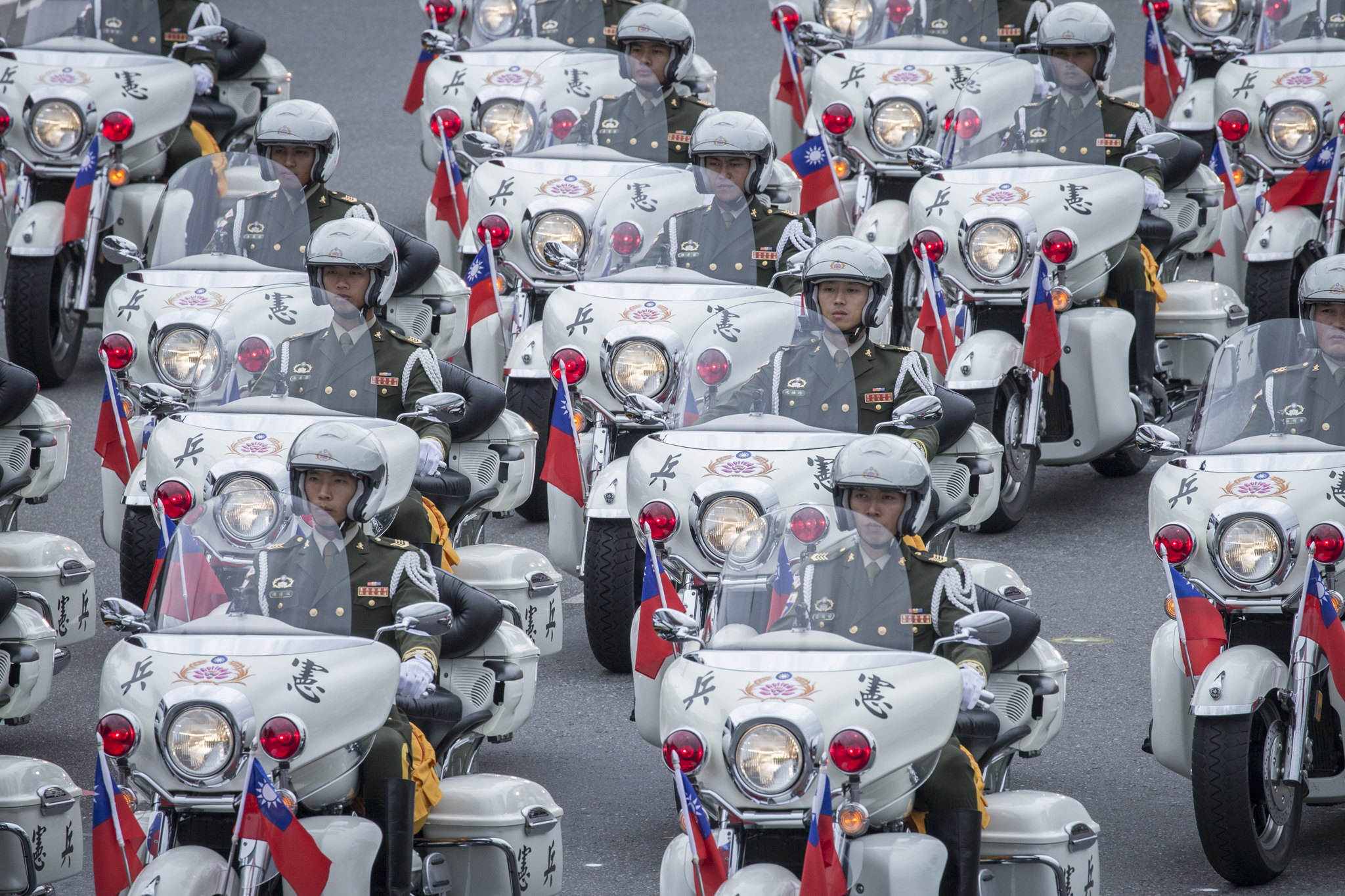
ROCMP motorcycle column (2018)

The mobile column, for many years, served as a crowd favorite of National Day civil-military parades, since in this segment the ROC shows off to its people the advanced and modern military equipment and vehicles in service and those being introduced, many of them nationally produced, for use by the servicemen and women of the ROCAF, and since 2016, the state civil security institutions. As in every parade, the ROCMP's motorcycle column leads off the mobile column segment, followed by (as of 2016):

- ROCN mobile column
  - Republic of China Marine Corps
    - Amphibious Reconnaissance and Patrol Unit
    - Amphibious Armor Group
  - Coastal and air defense formations of the Republic of China Navy
- Republic of China Air Force mobile column
  - Air defense guns and missiles
  - Equipment and materiel, including air to air missiles
- Mobile column of ROCA formations and equipment (order as of 1991, 2007, 2011 and 2016 parades)
  - Anti-tank weapons
  - Signals
  - Armored cavalry
  - CBRN defense
  - ROCA Corps of Engineers
  - Motorized and mechanized infantry
  - Armored formations
  - Logistical and combat support
  - Air defense and missiles (mobile missile and gun systems and truck-towed systems)
  - Towed guns of the field artillery
  - Self propelled artillery (MRLs and self-propelled guns)
  - Disaster risk and response vehicles and equipment for calamity response operations
- National Police Agency
  - Criminal Investigation Bureau vehicles and equipment
  - NPA National Highway Police
  - Mobile vehicles of the NPA's Special Police Corps
- National Fire Agency vehicles and equipment
- Coast Guard Administration small marine equipment and vehicles

Alongside the military and civil security mobile column, in the parades of the 70s and 80s and in more recent parades, a civil mobile column is present, composed of vehicles from the automobile and truck companies, state-owned firms, and the private sector.

== Celebrations outside the Republic of China ==
=== Mainland China and special administrative regions ===
Hong Kong

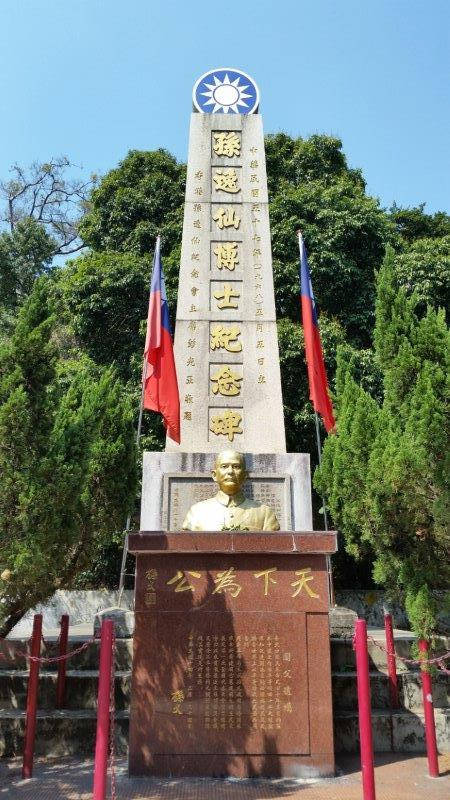
2017: Obelisk and Republic of China flags flying at Sun Yat Sen Commemorative Garden, Hong Kong

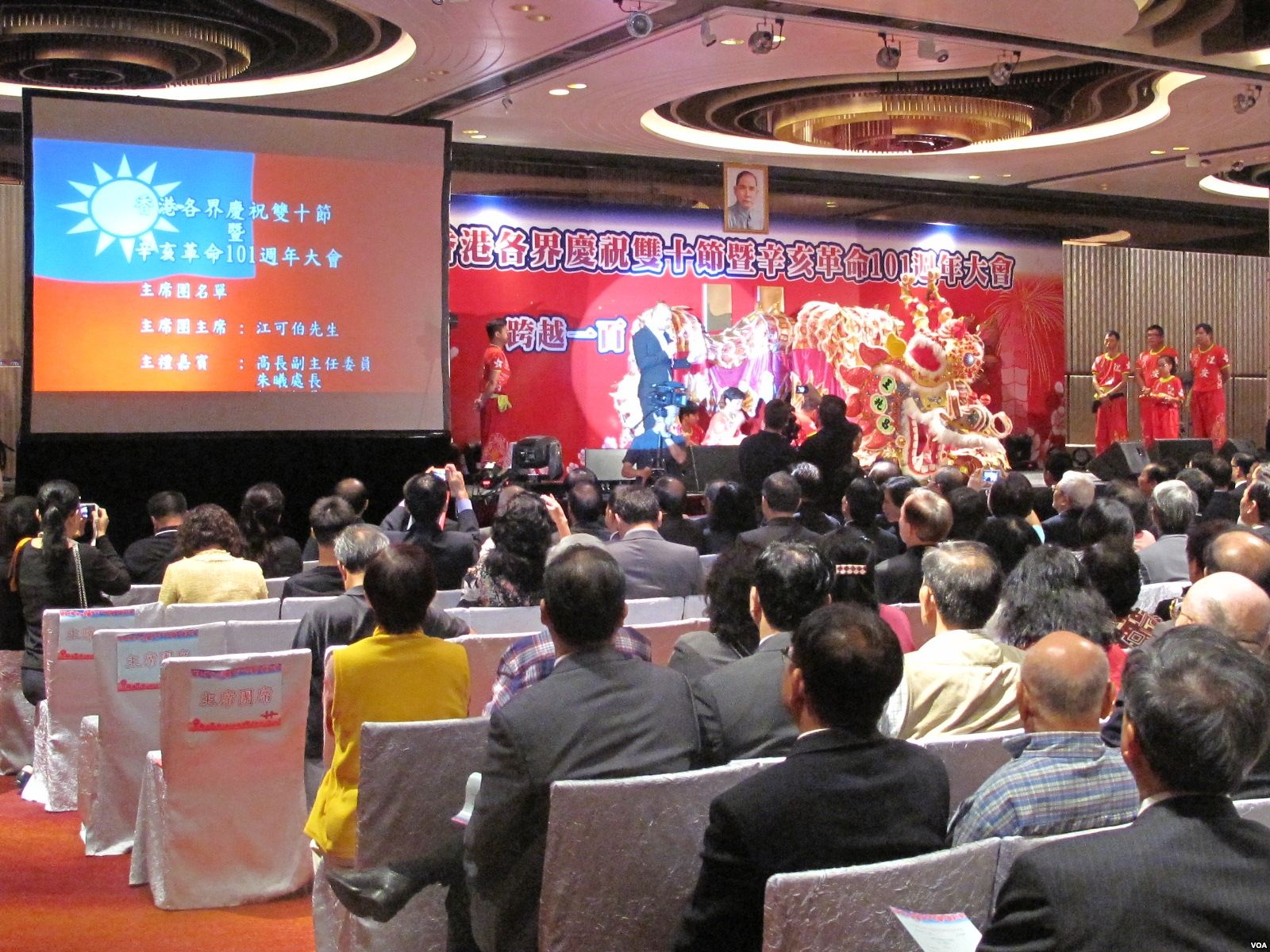
2012

As the Chinese Communist Party became the official government of mainland China in 1949, 10 October is now celebrated in the People's Republic of China as the anniversary of the Xinhai Revolution and the Wuchang Uprising.

The former British colony of Hong Kong celebrated the ROC National Day as a public holiday until the government of the United Kingdom cut its diplomatic relations with the ROC Government as London recognized Beijing in 1950, shortly after the PRC's founding and it was postponed. The former Portuguese colony of Macau had celebrated the ROC national day as a public holiday until the government of Portugal cut its relations as Lisbon recognizes Beijing in 1979. After the civil war in mainland China, the National Day was celebrated in regions inhabited by Chinese patriots who remained loyal to the Republic. Before the sovereignty of Hong Kong was transferred to the PRC in 1997 and Macau also transferred in 1999, many ROC supporters there would display patriotic and colourful flags (mainly the national flag of ROC) to celebrate the National Day. Taiwan agencies in Hong Kong and Macau have annually held a public ceremony to celebrate the National Day of ROC with members of pro-ROC private groups.

The day continues to be celebrated in Hong Kong and Macau after the transfer of sovereignty to the mainland, but the national flags publicly shown have been removed by Police of Hong Kong since July 1997 and by Police of Macau since December 1999. Flag-raising ceremony at Hung Lau, Tuen Mun, Sun Yat-sen's revolutionary base, is the most noticeable yearly event, organized by Johnny Mak. Since 2020, the event was celebrated as the PRC's Anniversary of the Xinhai Revolution rather than the ROC's Double Ten Day in line with the holidays in mainland China. Chris Tang claimed in September 2021 that celebrations in Hong Kong for Double Ten Day could risk breaching the national security law. The event in Macau is commemorated under the name of the Xinhai Revolution Memorial Day.

=== Other countries ===
National Day banners in overseas Chinatowns

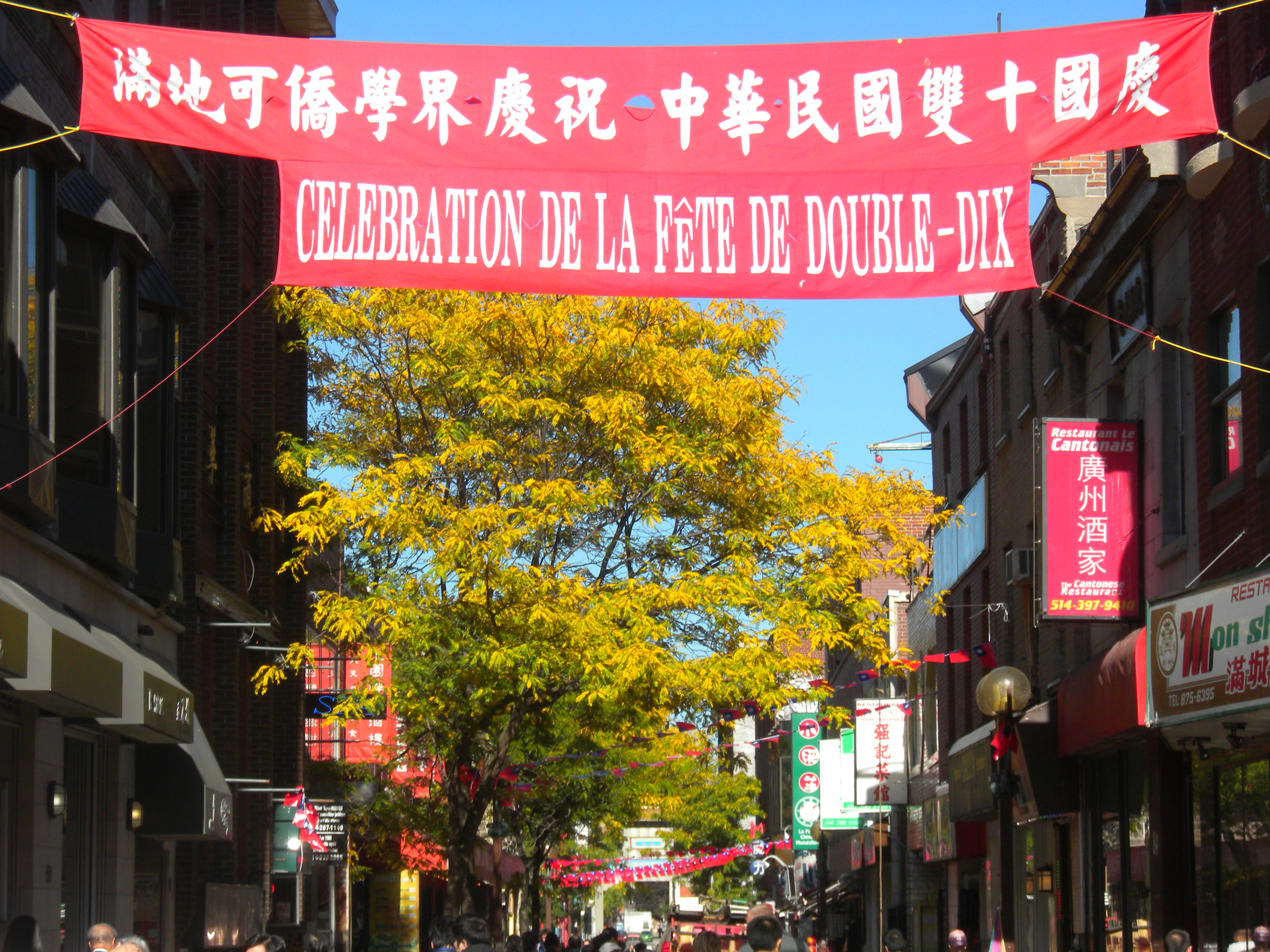
Chinatown, Montreal (2011)

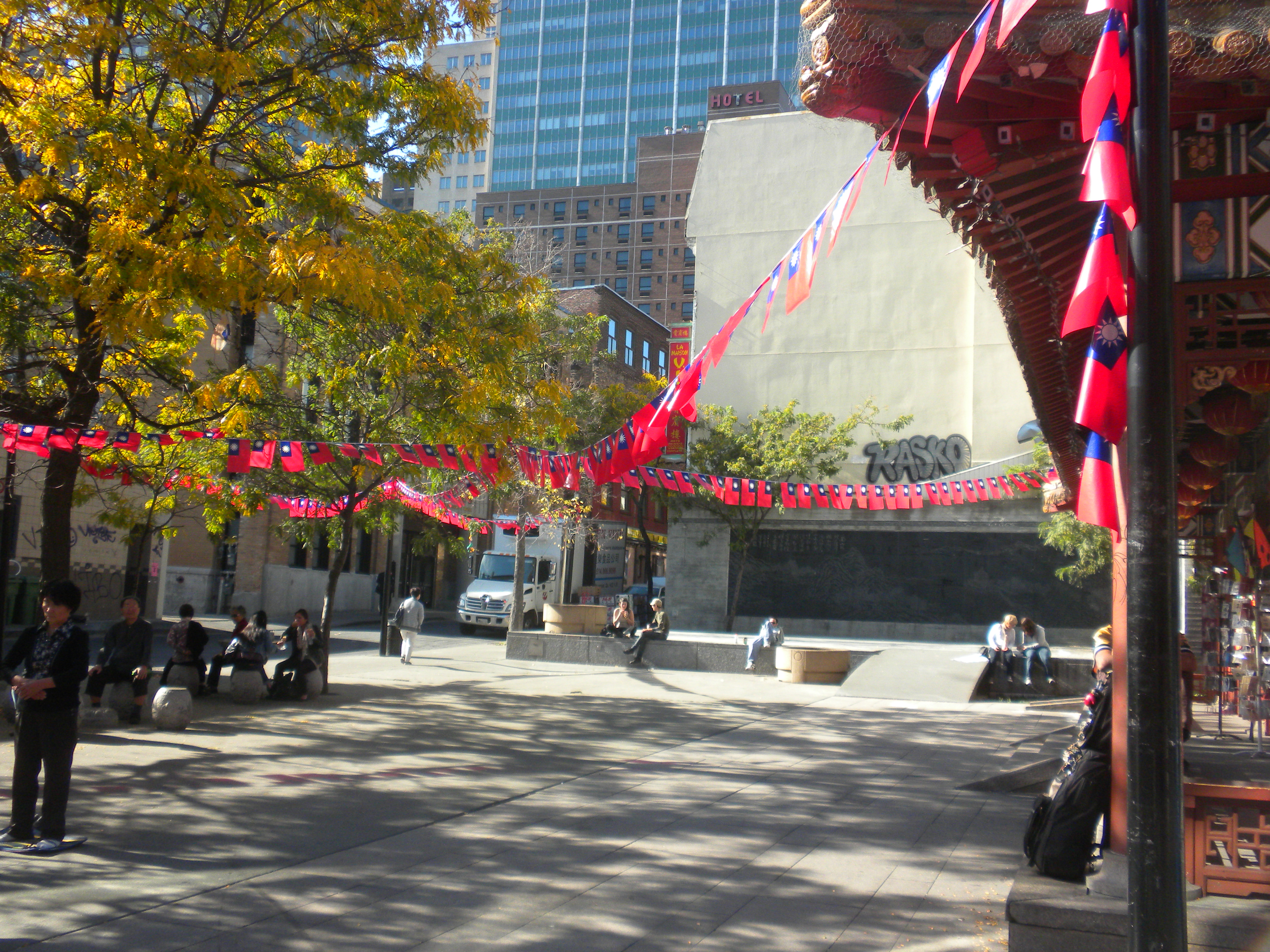
Chinatown, Montreal (2011)

Chinatown, San Francisco (2000)

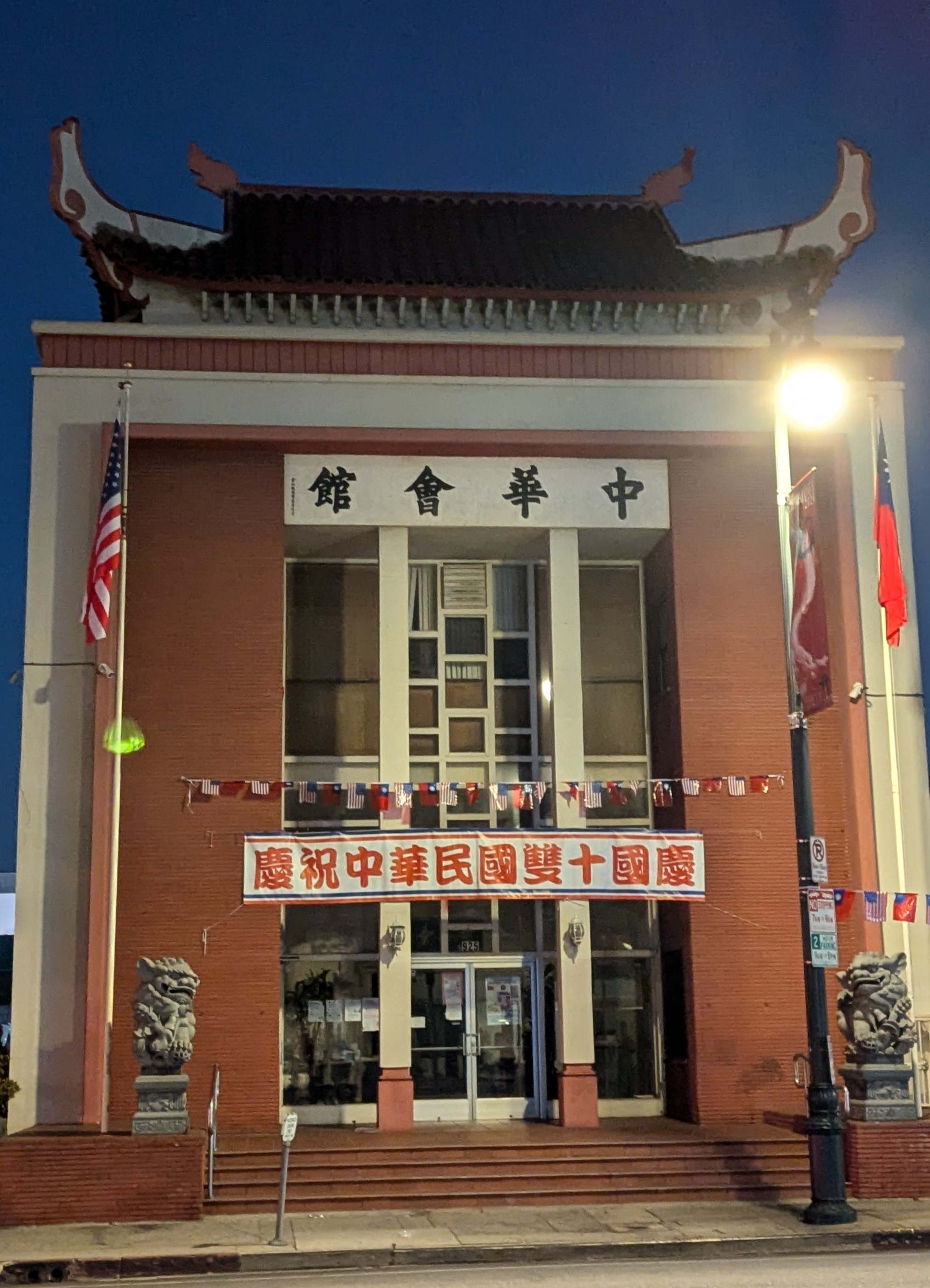
Chinatown, Los Angeles (2024)

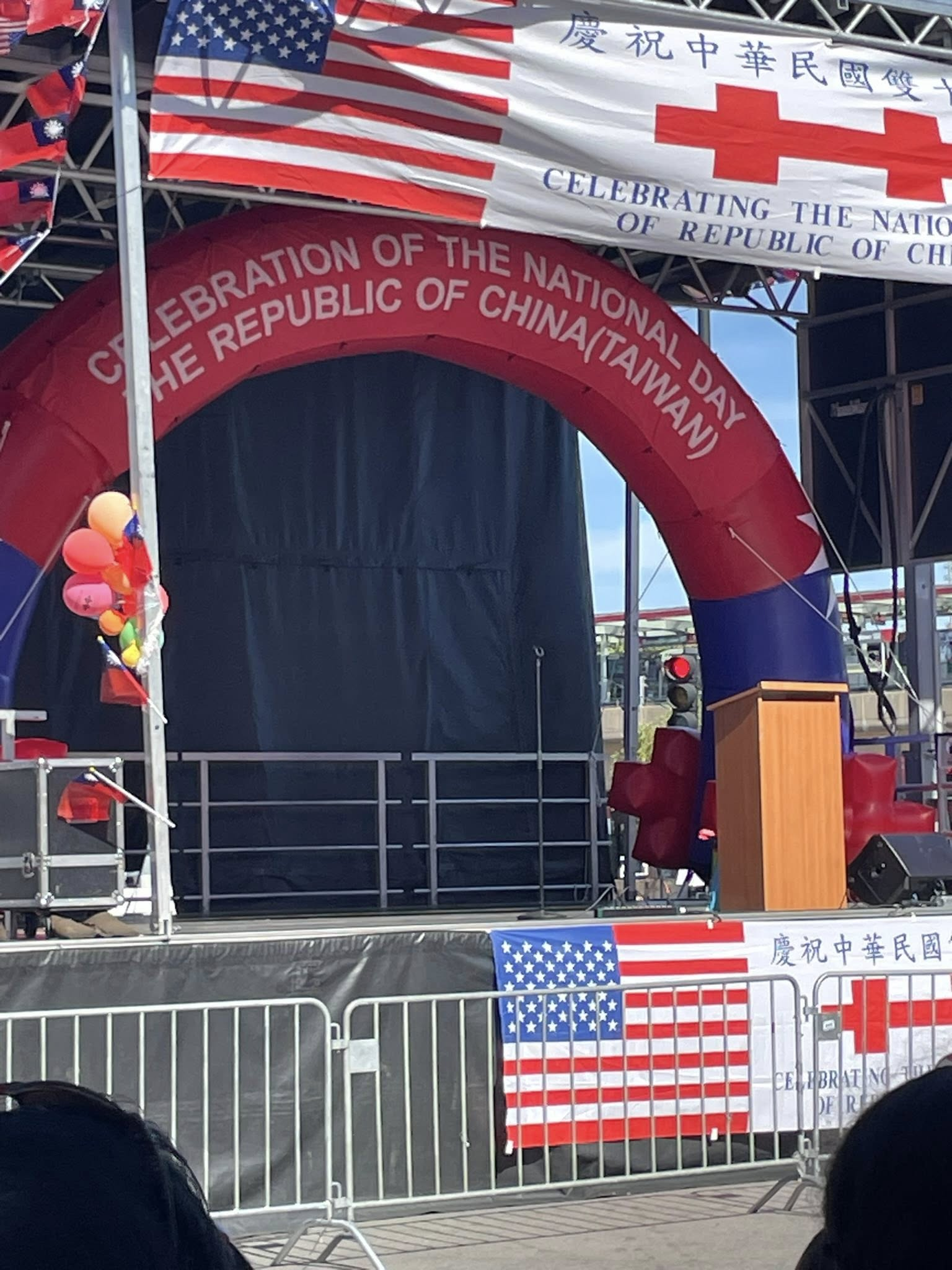
Chinatown, Chicago (2025)

Overseas Chinese played a key role in the birth of the ROC since the nation's founding father Sun Yat-sen, a medical doctor by training, received financial support mainly from the overseas Chinese communities abroad to overthrow the imperial Qing dynasty and establish the second republic in Asia in 1912. Outside Taiwan, the National Day is also celebrated by many Overseas Chinese communities. Sizable National Day parades occur yearly in the Chinatowns of San Francisco and Chicago.

== See also ==
- Republic of China nationalism
- History of the Republic of China
- National Day of the People's Republic of China
- 10 October 1943 uprising against the Japanese occupation of British Borneo
- Hong Kong 1956 riots
- Double Tenth Agreement
- Hong Kong–Taiwan relations
