= Guangdong Museum of Revolutionary History =

Museum in Guangzhou, China

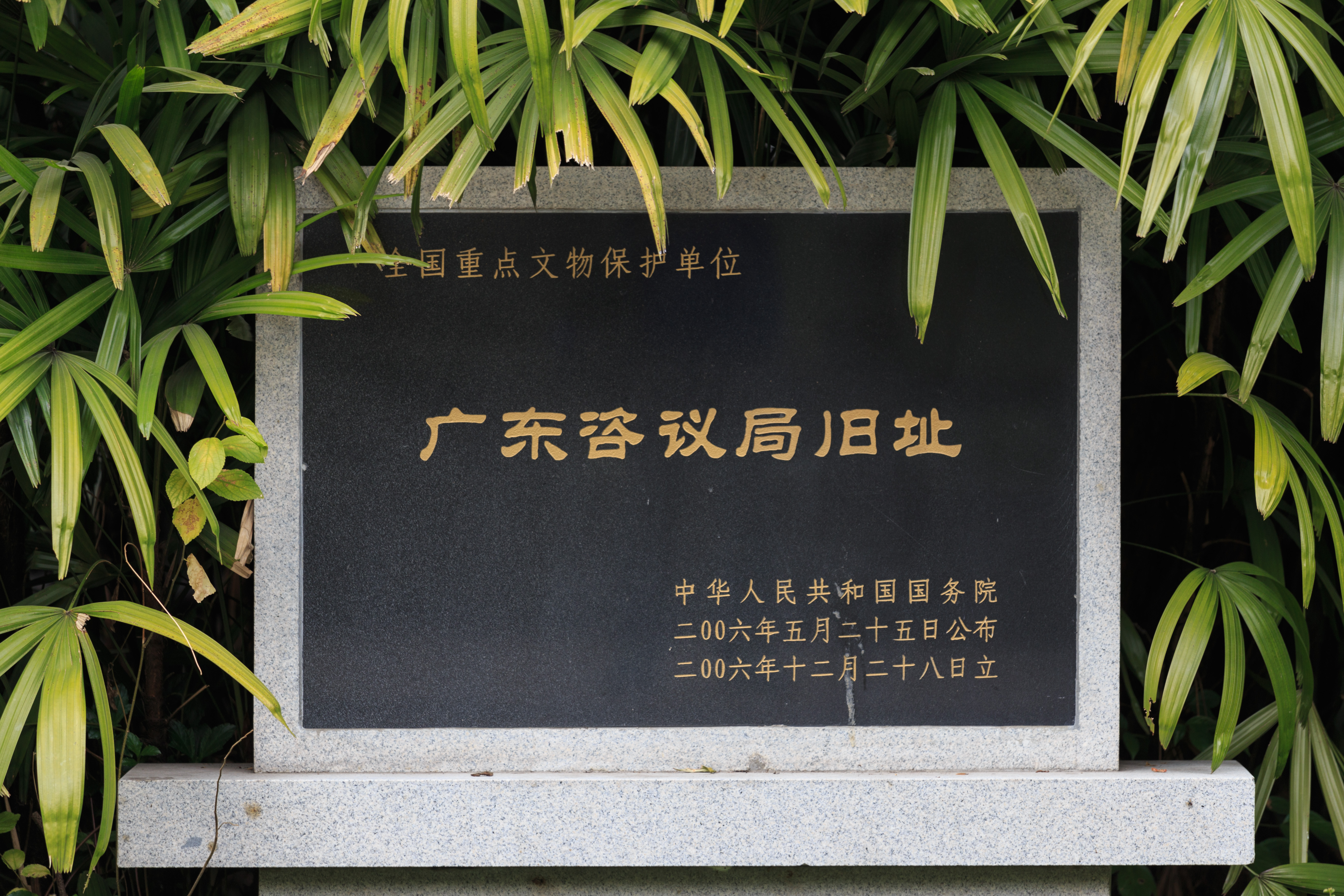
- Location: People's Republic of China
- Coordinates: 23°07′N 113°16′E
- Location of Guangdong Museum of Revolutionary History

The Guangdong Museum of Revolutionary History (Chinese: 广东革命历史博物馆) is a museum established in 1959 in Guangzhou, capital of China's Guangdong Province, located on the site of former Guangdong Advisory Bureau in the Second Guangzhou Uprising Martyrs Cemetery.

== History ==
The foundation was first announced in 1959. In the first year the area was 2,499 square metres (26,900 sq ft). The museum covers topics from the time of the First and Second Opium Wars to the People's Republic era. The museum has 17,117 items on display, 20,000 historical photos and 20 top-grade items.

== See also ==
- List of museums in China Guangdong Provincial Museum
