= Begonia Leaf Map =

Nationalist cartographic representation of the Republic of China's territorial claims

- Claimed territorial scope
- Traditional Chinese: 中華民國全圖
- Simplified Chinese: 中华民国全图
Transcriptions
Standard Mandarin
- Hanyu Pinyin: Zhōnghuá Mínguó Quántú
- Wade–Giles: Chung1-hua2 Min2-kuo2 Ch'üan2-t'u2

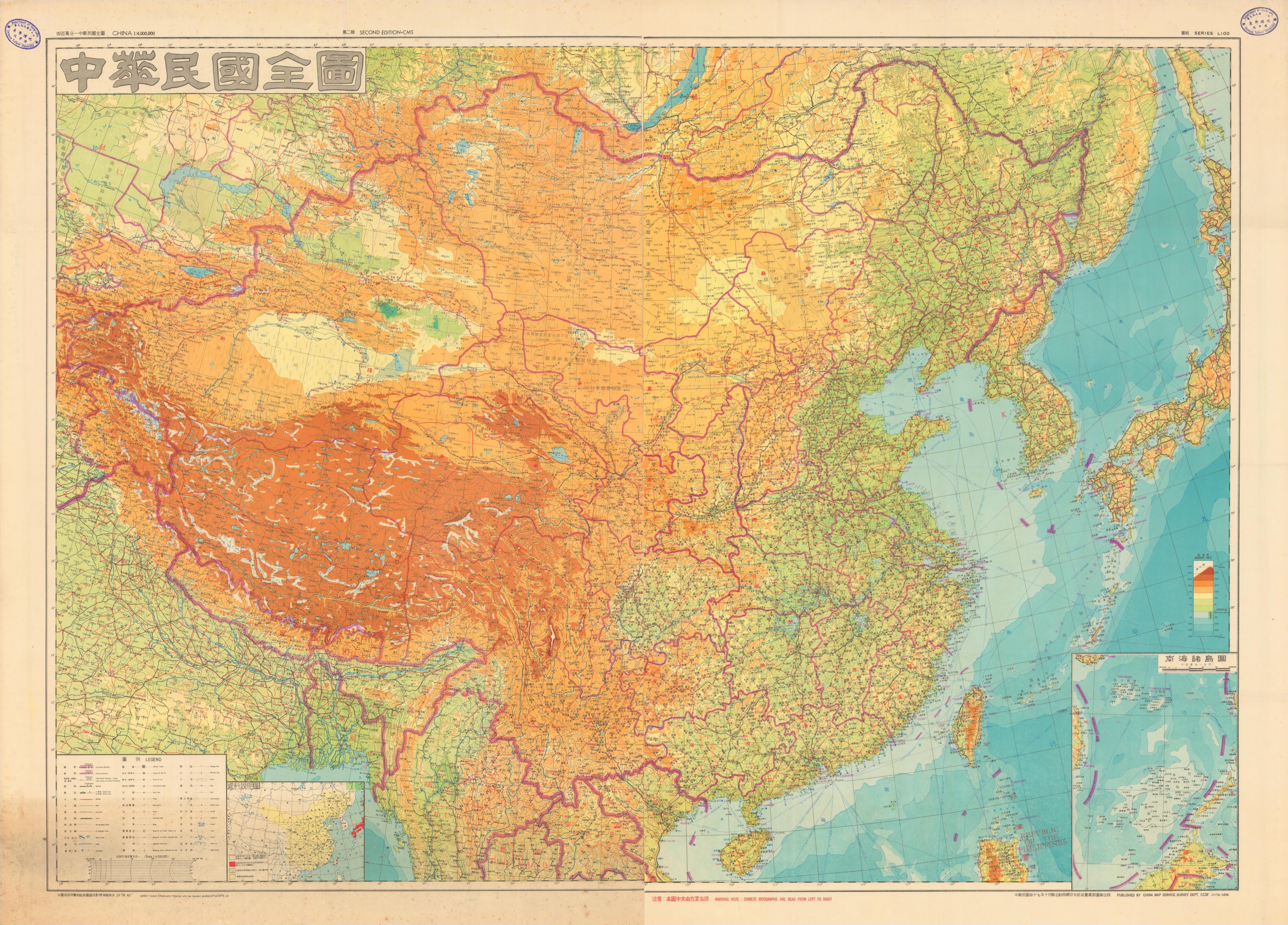
Map of the Republic of China, publicized by the Ministry of National Defense in 1958

The Begonia Leaf Map (Chinese: 秋海棠葉圖; pinyin: Qiūhǎitángyè Tù) is a popular designation for the historical map of the Republic of China (1912–1949). The name derives from the territory's perceived resemblance to the leaf of the Chinese begonia.

The map represents the territorial claims of the Republic of China, which composed a total of 11.41 million km² of territory and included Outer Mongolia, Tannu Uriankhai, Aksai Chin, Arunachal Pradesh, Jiangxinpo, Bạch Long Vĩ Island, the Sixty-Four Villages East of the River, Heixiazi and parts of the Pamir Mountains, many of which were not under the effective administration of the Republican government. Following the 1945 Mongolian independence referendum and the subsequent establishment of the People's Republic of China in 1949, this cartographic representation was gradually superseded in mainland China by the "rooster-shaped" map, reflecting the current borders of the PRC. However, the "Begonia leaf" remained the official national outline in the Republic of China on Taiwan until the early 2000s.

== History ==
=== Origin and conceptualization ===
The territorial extent of the "Begonia leaf" was primarily established during the Qing dynasty through a series of military expansions and administrative consolidations. These imperial conquests created the administrative framework for the "Greater China" concept, standardizing the borders that would later become a point of contention for the Republic of China's territorial claims.

The visual conceptualization of the "Begonia leaf" gained public prominence in 1905, when the Commercial Press published the Complete Map of the Great Qing Empire (Chinese: 大清帝國全圖; pinyin: Dàqīng Dìguó Quántú). This publication served as a key milestone in national identity construction, standardizing the "Begonia" outline in the Chinese public consciousness shortly before the Xinhai Revolution.

=== Qing conquest of Mongolia and Xinjiang ===
The integration of Outer Mongolia into the "Begonia leaf" framework was a result of the Dzungar–Qing War. In 1688, following a devastating invasion by the Dzungar Khanate under Galdan Boshugtu Khan, the Khalkha nobility fled to Inner Mongolia to seek protection from the Qing dynasty. The Kangxi Emperor exploited this crisis, demanding that the Khalkha leaders become his vassals in exchange for military support.

In 1691, the Dolon Nor Assembly (also known as the Dolnuur Congress) was convened. Under the guidance of Zanabazar, the Khalkha khans formally pledged allegiance to the Qing Emperor, marking the administrative incorporation of Eastern Mongolia into the empire's vassal system.

The frontier was further expanded during the Qianlong era to include the entirety of Xinjiang, while the Qing government consolidated authority over Tibet and Qinghai. This process involved the Dzungar genocide (1755–1758), which effectively finalized the northwestern borders of the "Begonia leaf" territory.

=== Republican era (1912–1949) ===
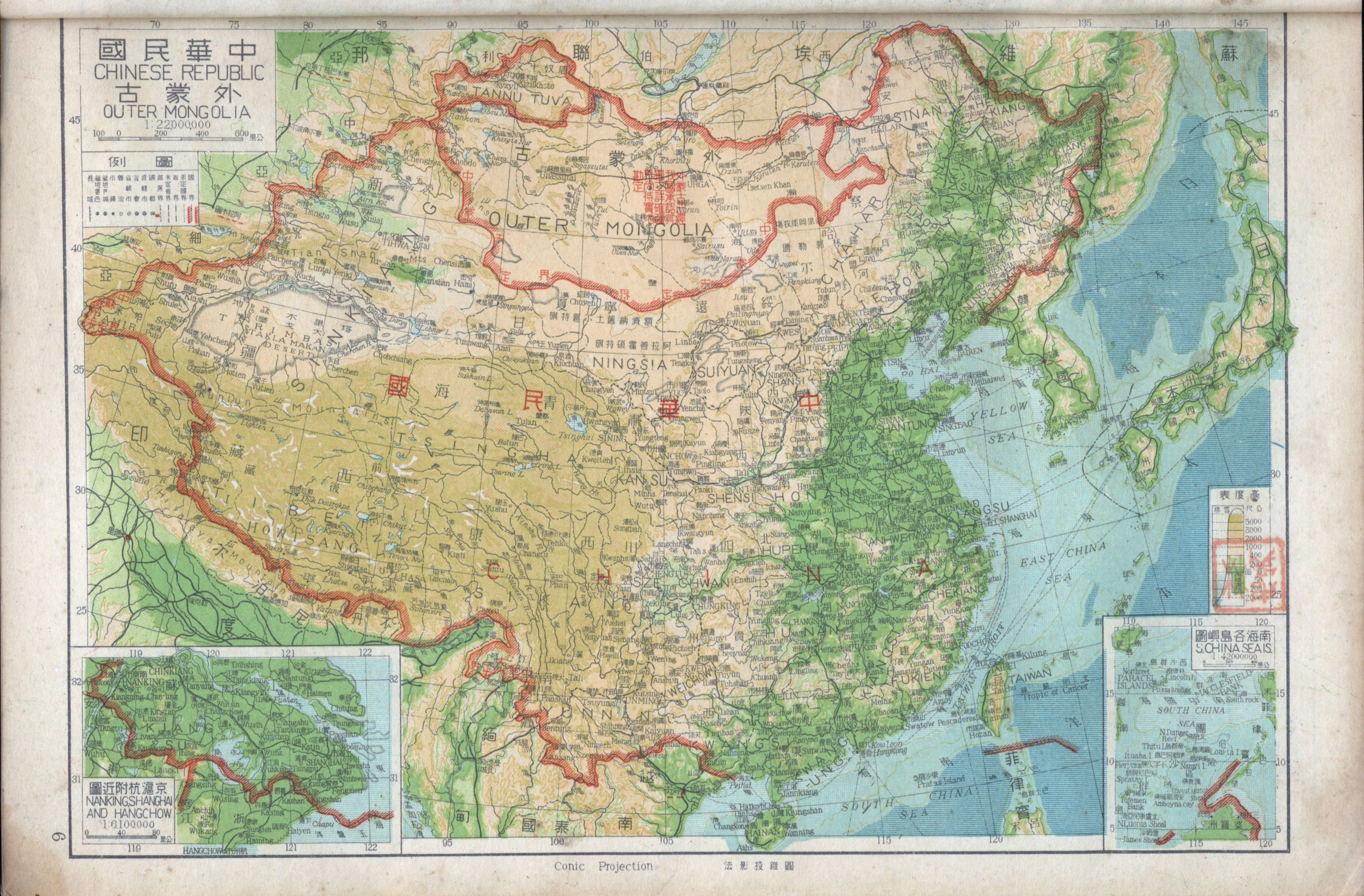
Map of the Republic of China and Outer Mongolia, publicized in 1947

Following the Xinhai Revolution and the establishment of the Republic of China (1912–1949) in 1912, the new government asserted legal succession to all territories formerly held by the Qing dynasty. The Provisional Constitution confirmed the "Begonia leaf" outline—including Outer Mongolia—as the official national territory. The map is also linked to the Map of National Shame.

However, effective control over the northern frontiers rapidly disintegrated. In 1911, Outer Mongolia declared independence, leading to decades of geopolitical maneuvering between China, Russia, and later the Soviet Union. Despite a brief military reoccupation by General Xu Shuzheng in 1919, the 1924 proclamation of the Mongolian People's Republic created a de facto separation that the Beiyang government and the subsequent Nanjing government refused to recognize on official maps.

The "Begonia" outline faced its most significant legal contraction following World War II. Under the terms of the Sino-Soviet Treaty of Friendship and Alliance (1945), the ROC government agreed to recognize the results of a referendum on Mongolian independence. Following the vote, the ROC formally recognized Outer Mongolia as a sovereign state in 1946, causing the official map outline to shift toward the "rooster" shape for the first time.

=== Maintenance and abandonment in Taiwan (1949–2002) ===
After the ROC government relocated to Taiwan in 1949, the "Begonia leaf" was restored as a de jure territorial claim. In 1953, the government under Chiang Kai-shek abrogated the 1945 treaty with the Soviet Union, citing Soviet violations. Consequently, official ROC maps reverted to the "Begonia" shape, reclaiming Outer Mongolia as part of its "inherent territory" despite having no administrative control.

Map of Taiwan, publicized by the Ministry of Intererior in 2017

This symbolic claim persisted throughout the Cold War but began to diminish after the ROC lost its United Nations seat in 1971. In the 1990s, following the democratization of Taiwan and a shift toward a more pragmatic foreign policy, the claim was gradually phased out. In 2002, the Ministry of the Interior officially revised the Complete Map of the Republic of China, removing Outer Mongolia and other irredentist claims. Starting that year, official maps issued by the ROC (Taiwan) focus on its effectively controlled territories, effectively ending the official use of the "Begonia leaf" image.

== See also ==
- Irredentism
- Territorial claims of the Republic of China
- Outer Mongolia independence referendum, 1945
- Map of National Shame
- Nine-dash line
- Borders of China
- Cartography of China
- National humiliation
