= Chung Yuan Christian University Chang Ching Yu Memorial Library =

Library in Taoyuan City, Taiwan

- 中原大學張靜愚紀念圖書館
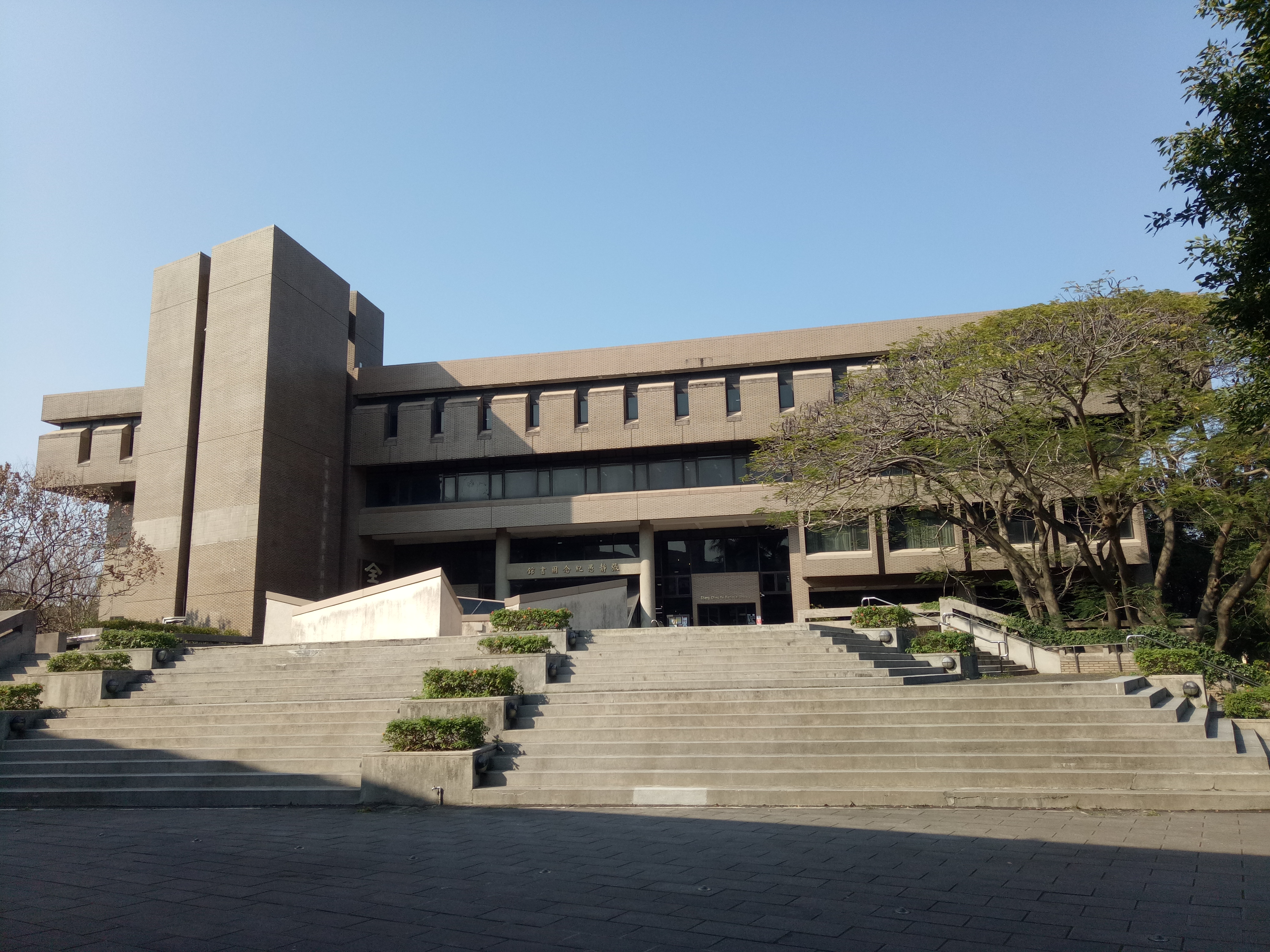
- 24°57′27.71″N 121°14′26.47″E
- Location: Zhongli District, Taoyuan City, Taiwan
- Type: Academic library
- Established: 1955

Collection
- Items collected: Books, Audio-visual materials, Journals, Serials, Electronic resources
- Size: Over 813,000

Other information
- Website: www.lib.cycu.edu.tw (in Chinese and English)

Chung Yuan Christian University Chang Ching Yu Memorial Library (Chinese: 中原大學張靜愚紀念圖書館; pinyin: Zhōng Yuán Dà Xué Zhāng Jìng Yú Jì Niàn Tú Shū Guǎn) is the library at Chung Yuan Christian University in Zhongli District, Taoyuan City, Taiwan.

== History ==
The library was established in 1955, the construction of the current library building began in October 1983, and was completed in 1985. Architecture and design work were done by Wang Chiu-Hwa and Joshua Jih Pan. Later, to commemorate the deceased former Chairman Chang Ching Yu, the board of directors decided to name the library "Chang Ching Yu Memorial Library".

== Architecture ==
The library is a six-floor building with five floors above ground level and one basement. The gross area of construction is about 11,900 square meters.

=== Floor plan ===
Floors	Use
5F	CYCU Theses & Dissertations, Bound Periodicals Stacks, Chinese Collections Stacks (Call no. 500–999), 12 Individual Study Rooms.
4F	Chinese Collections Stacks (Call no. 000–499), New Arrivals-Chinese Collections, Design and Art Collections, Special Christian Collections.
3F	Western Collections Stacks, New Arrivals-Western Collections, Subject Book Exhibition, 100 Great Books, Compact Shelves, Creative Learning Room.
2F	Reader Services Section, Circulation Desk, Reference Desk, Entrance Desk, Information Commons, Periodicals Area, Periodicals Work Area, Chang Ching Yu Memorial Room, Self Check Locker, Book Drop.
1F	Library Director's Office, Acquisition and Cataloging Section, System Information Section, Hsiu Te Hall.
B1F	Study Room, Study Hall, Rarely Used Books Area.
Holistic Education Village 2F	Multimedia Learning Center.

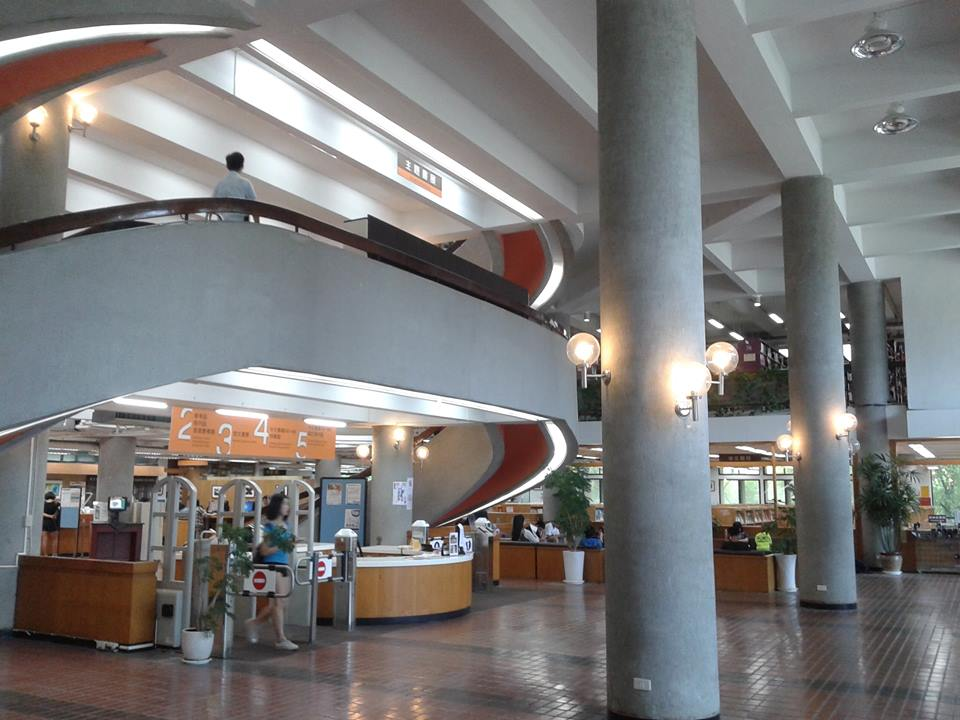
2nd Floor

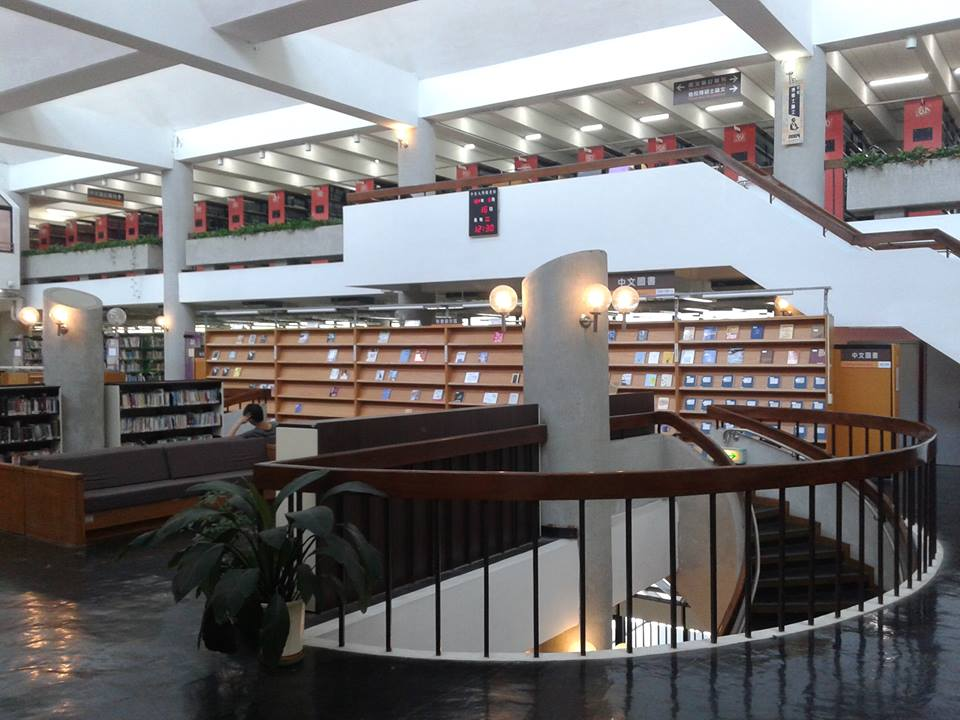
4th Floor

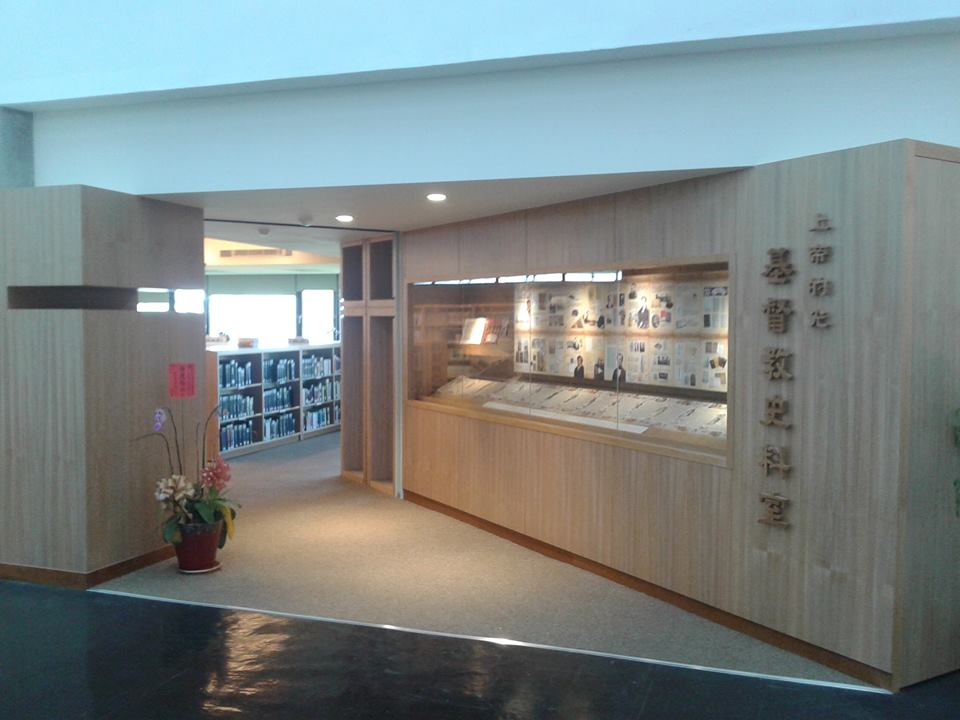
Special Christian Collections Room

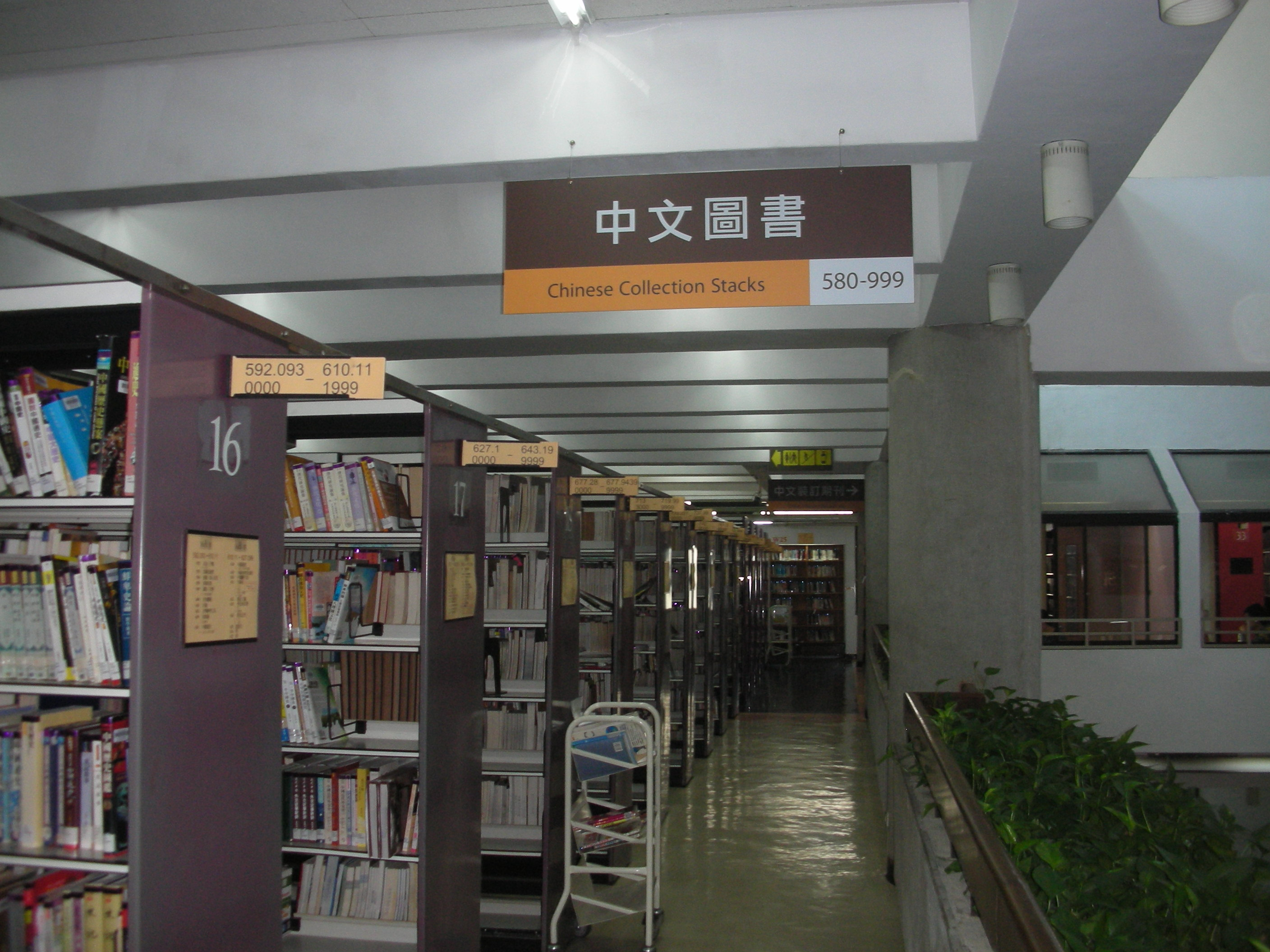
5th Floor
