= Mongolia Area =

Administrative division of the Republic of China

Mongolia Area 蒙古地方 ᠭᠠᠳᠠᠭᠠᠳᠤ ᠮᠣᠩᠭ᠋ᠣᠯ
- Area of the Republic of China
- 1912–1945
- Location of Mongolia Area as part of the Republic of China (claim only)
- Capital: Kulun
  - Type: Independent country (de facto); Area of the Republic of China (de jure)
- History
  - Mongolia Area claimed by the ROC Provisional Government: 1 January 1912
  - Established: 1912
  - Mongolia re-occupied by China: October 1919
  - Mongolian People's Republic proclaimed: 1 March 1921
  - Mongolia’s independence recognised by China: 20 October
- Today part of: China ∟ Inner Mongolia; Mongolia; Russia ∟ Tuva

The Mongolia Area (Chinese: 蒙古地方; pinyin: Ménggǔ Dìfāng) was a province-level administrative division of the Republic of China in the 20th century. It was de jure created in 1928. After the Northern Expedition, the Mongolia Area and the Tibet Area were both special administrative divisions of the Republic of China equivalent to provincial-level administrative regions. The Executive Yuan also established a Mongolian and Tibetan Affairs Commission as its direct counterpart. In addition, the Mongolian League and Banner administrative organs, which were comparable to provincial governments, were the Mongolian Local Autonomous Political Affairs Commissions located in the four northern provinces.

The Mongolia Area was established in accordance with the Outer Mongolian administrative division of the Beiyang government, but the Nationalist government never actually controlled the region. The region covers an area of approximately 1.73 million square kilometers. In terms of area, the Mongolia Area was the second largest administrative division of the Republic of China, second only to Xinjiang Province. It had 4 departments, 2 regions, and 116 banners, 4 pastures, and 36 zuoling, among other sub-districts. However, due to its topography and the prohibition of Han Chinese immigration under the Treaty of Kyakhta, the population within the Mongolia Area was not large, with approximately 616,000 people in 1936.

== History ==
Xu Shuzheng, a member of the Anhui clique of the Beiyang government, served as the Northwest Frontier Commissioner and Commander-in-Chief of the Northwest Border Defense Army in 1919. In October of the same year, he sent troops to Outer Mongolia, forcing Outer Mongolia to formally revoke its autonomy on 17 November 1919. Following the Mongolian Revolution in March 1921, Mongolia regained its independence. After the death of Bogd Khan, with the support and actions of the Soviet Union and the Mongolian People's Party, the Mongolian government declared the abolition of the constitutional monarchy on 26 November 1924, establishing the Mongolian People's Republic, renaming the capital Ulaanbaatar, adopting 1911 as its founding year, and allowing the Soviet Red Army to station troops there. The Mongolian People's Republic was not recognized by the governments of major countries at the time, including China, the United Kingdom, the United States, and Japan.

On 20 October 1945, Mongolia held an independence referendum in accordance with the provisions of the exchange of notes in the Sino-Soviet Treaty of Friendship and Alliance. On 5 January 1946, the Nationalist government accepted the referendum results and formally recognized the independent status of the Mongolian People's Republic. The National government issued a statement saying: "The people of Outer Mongolia held a referendum on 2o October 1945. The Central Government sent Lei Fazhang, the Vice Minister of the Interior, to observe the referendum. According to the report from the personnel in charge of the referendum in Outer Mongolia, the results of the referendum have confirmed that the people of Outer Mongolia support independence. In accordance with the deliberation of the Supreme National Defense Council, the independence of Outer Mongolia is hereby legally recognized. In addition to the Executive Yuan instructing the Ministry of the Interior to formally notify the government of Outer Mongolia of this resolution, this statement is hereby issued."

The People's Republic of China, which was established on 1 October 1949, established diplomatic relations with the Mongolian People's Republic on 16 October 1949. It recognizes the Mongolian People's Republic and its successor regimes as sovereign states, both practically and legally. On 1 February 1953, the Sixth Session of the United Nations General Assembly adopted Resolution 505. On February 24 of the same year, the Republic of China, which had retreated to Taiwan, abolished the Sino-Soviet Treaty of Friendship and Alliance in the Legislative Yuan and refused to recognize the Mongolian People's Republic, citing the Soviet Union's failure to fulfill its obligations under the Sino-Soviet Treaty of Friendship and Alliance. It called the United Nations General Assembly Resolution 505 a "major victory" in diplomacy. From then on, it unilaterally claimed that Mongolia was the territory of the Republic of China. The "Map of the Republic of China" attached to the "Meeting Records" compiled by the Secretariat of the National Assembly from May 1979 to October 1991 claimed that the territory of the Republic of China included Mongolia. However, in 1961, Mongolia joined the United Nations, and the Republic of China gave up the right to veto.

In 1993, Democratic Progressive Party (DPP) legislators first challenged this issue and petitioned the Judicial Yuan for a constitutional interpretation on the definition of territory, pointing out that the above statement ignored the international law convention that "recognition of a state is unconditional and irrevocable". The Judicial Yuan replied that the territorial issue was a political issue and could not be explained by the Judicial Yuan. On 3 October 2002, the Ministry of Foreign Affairs of the Republic of China recognized Mongolia as an independent country. After the original administrative divisions ceased to apply in 2005, the Mongolian League, Banner and County Organization Law was officially repealed by the Republic of China in 2006 In the same year, the Executive Yuan and Legislative Yuan removed the relevant articles on "Outer Mongolia" (the old name for Mongolia) from the "Detailed Rules for the Implementation of the Act Governing Relations between the People of the Taiwan Area and the Mainland Area," explicitly stating that "Mainland Area" refers only to "areas controlled by the CCP," and requiring that the border between Mongolia and mainland China (i.e., the Sino-Mongolian border) be marked as a national border in the revised "Precautions for Compiling and Printing Maps of Mainland Area of Our Country". The Republic of China added Mongolia to the introduction of various countries on the website of the Ministry of Foreign Affairs. In 2002, Taiwan established a representative office in Ulaanbaatar, the capital of Mongolia, and Mongolia also established a representative office in Taipei in 2003. On 3 October 2005, Taiwan also abandoned the legal administrative region codes of provinces (cities) and counties. The government also stopped issuing "Map of the Republic of China".

On 21 May 2012, the Mainland Affairs Council issued a press release formally denying that Outer Mongolia was an inherent territory of the Republic of China. It states that "when the Constitution of our country was drafted and promulgated in 1946, the independence of Mongolia (commonly known as Outer Mongolia) had been recognized by our government. Therefore, at that time, Mongolia was no longer the 'inherent territory' referred to in Article 4 of our Constitution." Although "in 1953, the Legislative Yuan passed a resolution to abolish the Sino-Soviet Treaty of Friendship and Alliance, the constitutional procedure for territorial change was not completed." It said that "Under international law, the recognition of a state is, in principle, 'unconditional and irrevocable,' and the relevant requirements for recognition at that time still exist today," denying that Outer Mongolia was the legal territory of the Republic of China, stating that "'Mongolia' is a state recognized by our government," confirming that the claim to sovereignty over Outer Mongolia had been completely abandoned. On 15 September 2017, the Republic of China government abolished the Mongolian and Tibetan Affairs Commission and downgraded it to the Mongolian and Tibetan Cultural Center of the Ministry of Culture. The Ministry of Foreign Affairs and the Mainland Affairs Council also assumed some of the functions of the Mongolian and Tibetan Affairs Commission.

Currently, Mongolia, with an area almost the same as China, is a UN member state and is recognized by the vast majority of countries, including the People's Republic of China. All maps of China and the world sold in Taiwan exclude Mongolia from China and mark it as an independent country, and the same applies to textbooks. Maps of the Republic of China (commonly known as " Begonia ") that include Outer Mongolia are now quite rare or no longer issued. Mongolia is also generally regarded as a sovereign state by the public.

== Geographical range ==
Nominally, the Mongolia Area was defined by the 1913 Sino-Russian Declaration as the area governed by the Qing dynasty's Minister of State for Kulun, the General of Uliastai, and the Minister of State for Kobdo (including the four Outer Khalkha tribes, Kobdo, and Tannu Uriankhai). The capital was Kulun (now Ulaanbaatar). In reality, the two Soviet satellite states (Mongolia and Tuva) covered a larger area than China claimed for Outer Mongolia. At that time, the de facto border between the Mongolian People's Republic and China stretched from the Altai Mountains watershed in the west, through the Gobi Desert, to the Greater Khingan Mountains and the Khalkh River in the east, while the Tuva People's Republic controlled a narrow strip of land in northwestern Mongolia, between the Sayan Mountains and the Tannu Mountains. In general, the region roughly corresponds to most of present-day Mongolia and the entire territory of the Tuva Republic within the Russia.

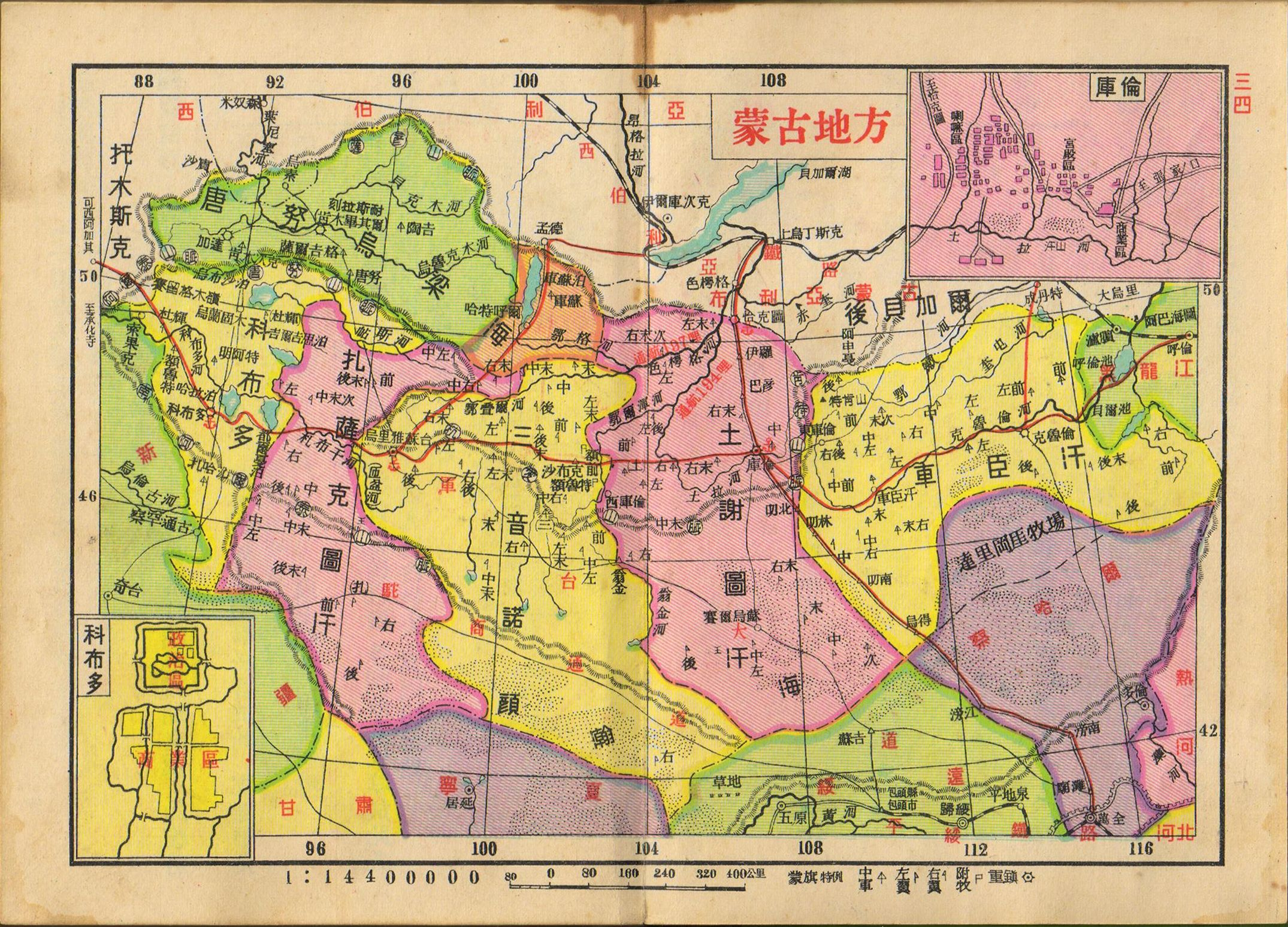
Map of Mongolia from the 1936 "Pocket Map of China" published by the Asia New Geographical Society

According to the Organizational Law of Mongolian Leagues, Divisions and Banners promulgated in 1931, the Mongolia Area included the Chechen Khanate, the Tushetu Khanate, the Sanin Noyan Khanate, the Zasagtu Khanate, the Saninjiyakhatu League, and the Tannu Uriankhai. However, although the Republic of China established administrative offices in Mongolia, its actual rule was short-lived (mainly from 1919 to 1921). Besides several periods of independence, Mongolia was also long influenced by Russia and controlled by the Soviet Union. In the early 1920s, upon the establishment of the Mongolian People's Republic, the old administrative divisions inherited from the Qing Dynasty were abolished, and the modern administrative divisions of Mongolia were gradually reformed.

=== Leagues and banners ===
The Republic of China failed to effectively govern the Mongolian regions it claimed, but nominally continued to use leagues (khanates) and banners as administrative divisions. These divisions underwent numerous changes between 1928 and 2004. According to the original "Administrative Region Codes of Provinces and Counties of the Republic of China" issued by the Directorate-General of Budget, Accounting and Statistics of the Republic of China, Mongolia was divided into the Kherlenbar and Tun Leagues, Khan-Arin League, Chizierlik League, Zhaqbilasechinbidur League, Sanjiyakhatu Left League, Sanjiyakhatu Right League, and Tannu Uriankhai, among others.
