= Map of National Shame =

Map of Chinese irrendentist claims

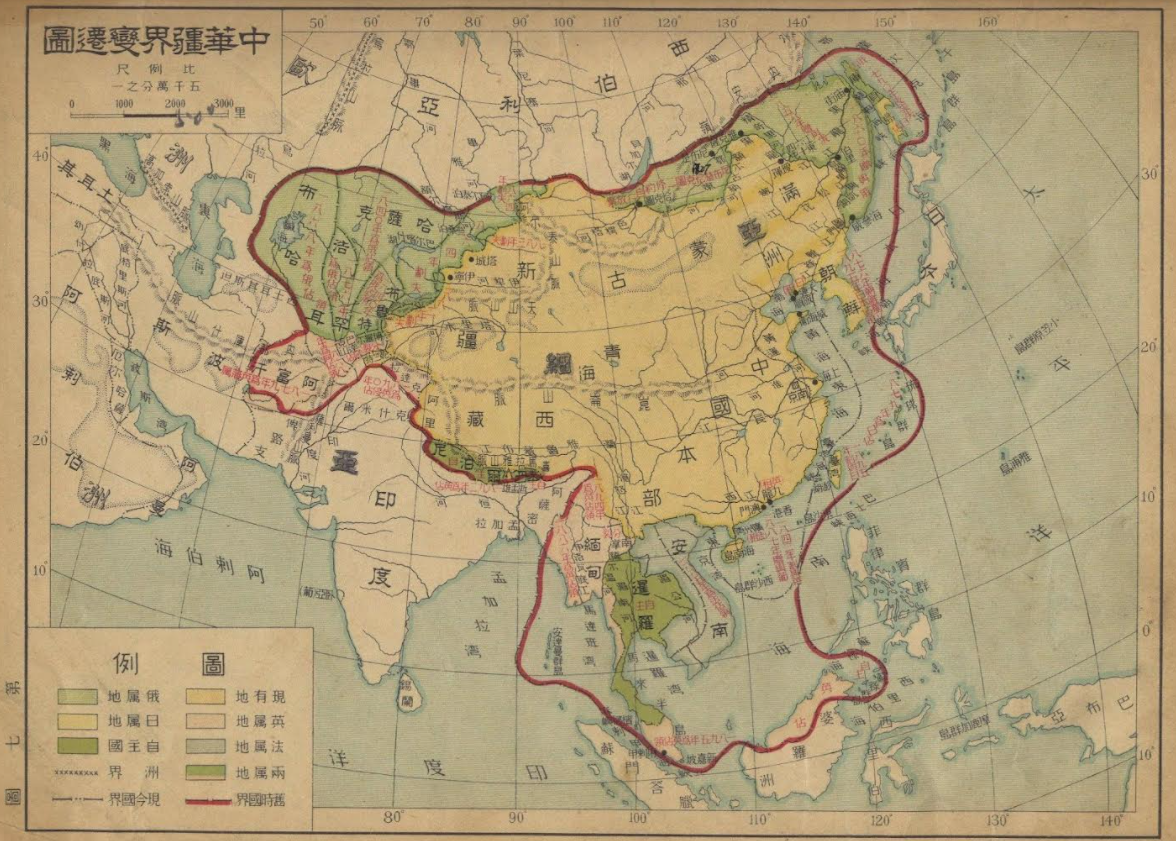
Map of Chinese border changes (中華疆界變遷圖), an example of the Map of National Shame: the 1933 New National Map for Elementary School Use by the World Geographical Society

The Map of National Shame (simplified Chinese: 国耻地图; traditional Chinese: 國恥地圖; Japanese: 国恥地図) is a map created around 1930 by the Nationalist government of the Republic of China, depicting territories that China perceived to have lost to the control or influence of Western powers and Japan. It is linked to the Begonia leaf map, also produced by the Nationalist Government.

== Overview ==
This map was used in elementary school geography textbooks published in 1933 by the World Geography Society in Shanghai and portrayed territories that China taught as having lost. These included the territories of several countries from the Ryukyu Islands, such as Okinawa, to Taiwan (then under Japanese rule), Pratas Island, Palawan in the Philippines, the Indochinese Peninsula, the northern part of Borneo (present-day Malaysia), Brunei, the Malay Peninsula (including modern Malaysia and Singapore), the Andaman Islands of India, the Korean Peninsula, Central Asia, Sakhalin, and others. The map notably excludes the Spratly Islands and Scarborough Shoal.

The total area of these territories is double the present land area of the People's Republic of China.

According to Professor Yūsuke Anami of Tohoku University, the elites of modern China hold similar views of history, though the scope of the territories may differ somewhat. In short, the actions of China which Japan and Western countries refer to as attempts to "change the status quo by force" are seen in China as the "recovery of lost lands".

== Discussion by the U.S. military ==
Instructors at the U.S. military's reconnaissance and intelligence officer training institution at the Goodfellow Air Force Base in Texas have been known to use this map as a basis for discussions. According to Professor Tomohide Murai of Tokyo International University, the U.S. Air Force may have been investigating the possibility that the People's Liberation Army of China was accelerating its actions under the banner of 'recovering lost territories'.

== See also ==
- Begonia leaf map
- Century of humiliation
- Regional reactions to China's maritime activities in the South China Sea
