= United Nations General Assembly Resolution 505 (VI) =

UN General Assembly Resolution 505
- Date: 1 February 1952
- Meeting no.: 369
- Code: A/RES/505(VI) (Document)
- Subject: Threats to the political independence and territorial integrity of China and to the peace of the Far East, resulting from Soviet violations of the Sino-Soviet Treaty of Friendship and Alliance of August 14, 1945 and from Soviet violations of the Charter of the United Nations.
- Voting summary: 25 voted for; 9 voted against; 24 abstained
- Result: Adopted

The United Nations General Assembly Resolution 505 is titled Threats to the political independence and territorial integrity of China and to the peace of the Far East, resulting from Soviet violations of the Sino-Soviet Treaty of Friendship and Alliance of August 14, 1945 and from Soviet violations of the Charter of the United Nations. The UN General Assembly adopted this resolution on 1 February 1952 during its sixth session after the Republic of China complained to the United Nations against the Soviet Union.

== Historical background ==
The Empire of Japan invaded Manchuria (Northeast China) in 1931 and established Manchukuo in 1932. The Nationalist government protested the Japanese invasion and the League of Nations voted 42-1 (only Japan voted against) to pass the Lytton Report to demand Manchuria be returned to China, but Japan refused to comply and left the League of Nations. The Republic of China neither recognized Manchukuo nor was able to recover Manchuria.

In World War II, one Soviet precondition for a declaration of war against Japan was an American recognition of Mongolian independence from China, and a recognition of Soviet interests in the Manchurian railways and Port Arthur; these were agreed without Chinese representation or consent. The Soviet threat of seizing parts of Inner Mongolia induced China to recognize Outer Mongolia's independence, provided that a referendum be held. The referendum took place on 20 October 1945, with (according to official numbers) 100% of the electorate voting for independence. In line with the concluding statement of the Yalta Conference and to receive the southern part of Sakhalin and the Kuril Islands after the defeat of Japan, Soviet Union immediately fought against Japan. Later, the USSR and the Republic of China signed the Treaty of Friendship and Alliance with the Republic of China on 14 August 1945. However, the National Government of the Republic of China believed the Soviet Union violated the treaty because it obstructed the efforts of the Republic of China to re-establish national authority in Manchuria and aided the Chinese Communist Party by giving it weapons surrendered by the Japanese Imperial Army. Additionally, the Soviet Union handed territorial control to the Chinese Communist Party in that area against United States Marines aided military dispatchment and installation of Nationalist Government in North East China during the early period of Chinese Civil War after 1945.

In 1949, the Chinese Communist Party won the Chinese Civil War, resulting in the establishment of the People's Republic of China on 1 October 1949. The Kuomintang government of the Republic of China was forced to retreat to Taiwan, recovered from Japan in 1945 along with the Pescadores, where it continued to maintain itself as the sole legitimate government of all China and declared the Communist government to be illegitimate. With the support of the Western bloc amid the Cold War, the Republic of China was able to retain the seat of China in the United Nations despite having lost so much territory to the Communists. Both Mongolia and the nascent PRC confirmed their mutual recognition on 6 October 1949.

== The vote ==
On 1 February 1952, the Republic of China filed a complaint to the United Nations against the Soviet Union, which it resented for aiding the Communists in the Civil War. The UN General Assembly adopted Resolution 505 to condemn the Soviet Union, with 25 countries supporting the resolution, nine opposing, 24 abstaining, and two not voting.

== Later development ==
On 24 February 1953, the Legislative Yuan of the Republic of China abrogated the Sino-Soviet Treaty of Friendship and Alliance and rescinded recognition of the independence of the Mongolian People's Republic. The Republic of China considered Resolution 505 a diplomatic victory, even though the hope of recovering mainland China and Mongolia grew increasingly dimmer as time went by. The Republic of China vetoed the Mongolian bid for UN membership in 1955, but pressure from the Soviet bloc, Third World states and non-aligned states eventually forced the Republic of China to stop blocking Mongolia, so Mongolia joined the UN in 1961 in exchange for the Republic of China retaining its seat in the General Assembly in the same year at that time.

Although the Kuomintang government at the time made territorial claims over Outer Mongolia, whilst the Constitutional Court of the Republic of China (regarding interpretation of the ROC constitution) remained neutral on this issue. Under the Chen Shui-bian administration, the Democratic Progressive Party (DPP) government have officially renounced the ROC claims to Mongolia in 2002. On 21 May 2012, the Mainland Affairs Council released a press saying that since the Republic of China had recognized Mongolia's independence in 1946 before the constitution was enacted, Outer Mongolia was no longer part of the territory of the Republic of China. Taiwan's Ministry of Foreign Affairs opened a representative office in Mongolia in 2002 with reciprocity from Mongolia in Taiwan in 2003. The Republic of China's Mongolian and Tibetan Affairs Commission was also formally repealed in 2017.

== See also ==
- China and the United Nations
- UN General Assembly Resolution 2758
- Political status of Taiwan
- Foreign relations of the People's Republic of China
- Foreign relations of the Republic of China
- Mongolia–Taiwan relations
