= Outer Mongolia =

Historical region

Outer Mongolia ᠠᠷᠤ ᠮᠣᠩᠭᠣᠯ 外蒙古 Гадаад Монгол or Халх Монгол
- Area of the Qing dynasty (1691–1911) and the Republic of China (1912–1946, 1953–2002)
- 1691–2002
- Map of the de jure Outer Mongolia (Mongolia Area) within the ROC in 1945
- Capital: Ulan Bator
- Area
  - 1953: 1,734,616 km^{2} (669,739 sq mi)
- Population
  - 1953: 854,500
- History
  - Seizure of northern Khalkha: 1691
  - Uryankhay Republic declares independence: 1 December 1911
  - Independence from the Qing dynasty: 29 December 1911
  - Beiyang occupation: 1919–1921
  - Mongolian Revolution of 1921: 1 March 1921
  - Mongolian People's Republic proclaimed: 26 November 1924
  - Independence referendum: 20 October 1945
  - Independence recognized by China: 5 January 1946
  - ROC government retreated to Taiwan: 7 December 1949
  - Reasserted claims to Outer Mongolia: 24 February 1953
  - Re-recognized by the ROC: 10 September 2002
Preceded by
1691: Northern Yuan dynasty
Dzungar Khanate
Succeeded by
1911: Bogd Khanate of Mongolia
Uryankhay Republic
1946: Mongolian People's Republic
- Today part of: Mongolia; Russia; Tuva Republic

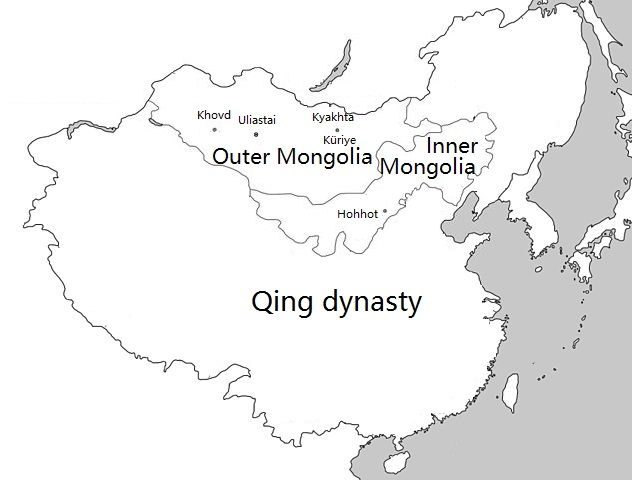
North Mongolia and South Mongolia within the Qing dynasty.

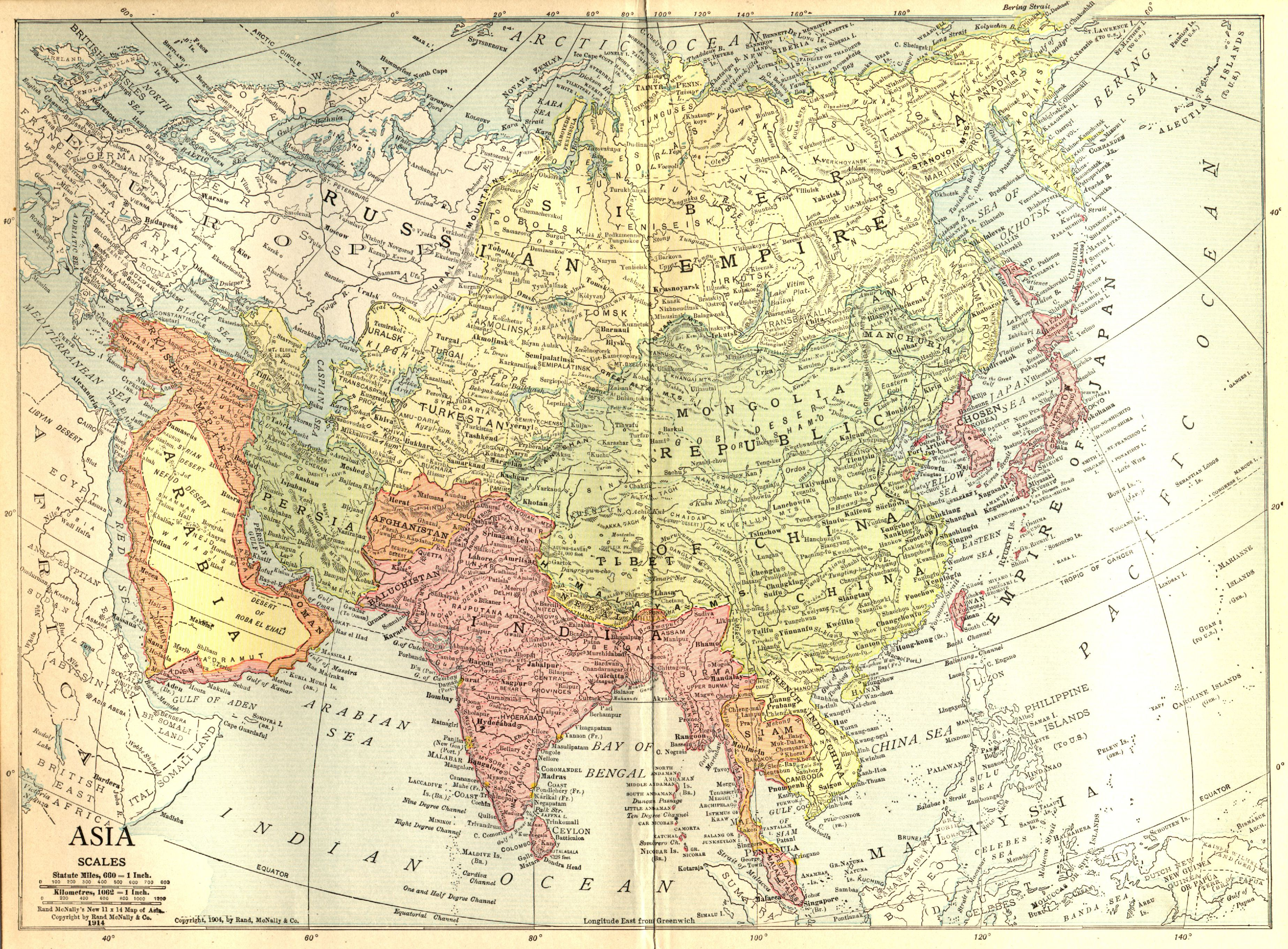
Map of Asia in 1914. Mongolia's independence had not yet been widely recognized in the 1910s.

Outer Mongolia (Note: The term "Ar Mongol" (Mongolian: ᠠᠷᠤ ᠮᠣᠩᠭᠣᠯ, Ар Монгол, IPA transcription: [ar ˈmɔɴɢɞɮ], lit. 'back side of Mongolia') appears to have first appeared at the end of the 16th century and the beginning of the 17th century. Initially, "Ar Mongol" referred to the Mongols west of the Greater Khingan, but later the scope of reference changed and was used to refer to the Khalkha Mongols north of the Gobi Desert. In the early 20th century, the name "Outer Mongolia" (Mongolian script: ᠭᠠᠳᠠᠭᠠᠳᠤ ᠮᠣᠩᠭᠣᠯ，Cyrillic: Гадаад Монгол, Latin: Gadaad Mongol, [ɢaˈtaːt ˈmɔɴɢɞɮ]; Manchu: ᡨᡠᠯᡝᡵᡤᡳ ᠮᠣᠩᡤᠣ Tulergi Monggo; Chinese: 外蒙古; pinyin: Wài Měnggǔ) began to be used in official documents. In Mongolian reports and documents of the 1900s and 1920s, "Ar Mongol" was used interchangeably with "Outer Mongolia".) was the name of a territory in the Manchu-led Qing dynasty of China from 1691 to 1911. It corresponds to the modern-day independent state of Mongolia (Note: Sometimes called "Outer Mongolia" informally in current China.) and the Russian republic of Tuva.

The historical region gained de facto independence from Qing China during the Xinhai Revolution and the Republic of China formally recognized the independence of Mongolia on January 5, 1946. This was revoked in 1953 after the Soviet Union violated the Sino-Soviet Treaty of Friendship and Alliance and the ROC reasserted claims to Outer Mongolia, a claim that would continue to appear in ROC maps until 2002 when the Democratic Progressive Party-led government re-recognized Mongolia.

== History ==
While the administrative region of Outer Mongolia during the Qing dynasty only consisted of the four Khalkha aimags (Setsen Khan Aimag, Tüsheet Khan Aimag, Sain Noyon Khan Aimag, and Zasagt Khan Aimag), in the late Qing period, "Outer Mongolia" was also used to refer to the combined Khalkha and Oirat regions, as well as the directly-ruled Tannu Uriankhai.

Much of the region was subsequently claimed by the Republic of China, which had acquired the legal right to inherit all Qing territories through the Imperial Edict of the Abdication of the Qing Emperor, as an integral part of the state. This is referred to as Mongolia Area by Kuomintang to distinguish it from Outer Mongolia since 1928. Most of Outer Mongolia, however, was under the de facto control of the Bogd Khanate, which was largely unrecognized internationally. The Republic of China briefly established de facto rule over most of the region from 1919 to 1921. After the Mongolian People's Republic was founded in 1924, the Nationalist government of China de jure recognized Mongolian independence in 1946 under Soviet pressure, though this recognition was later rescinded by the Kuomintang government in 1953, (Note: In 2002, the ROC reaffirmed its recognition of Mongolia as an independent country again, and the Mainland Affairs Council issued a statement saying that "Mongolia (formerly known as Outer Mongolia in Taiwan) has never been part of its constitutionally claimed territory.") which had retreated to Taiwan because of continued Soviet support to the Chinese communists. The People's Republic of China continued recognition of the Mongolian People's Republic since 1949, and has established full diplomatic relations with Mongolia.

== Names ==
The name "Outer Mongolia" is contrasted with Inner Mongolia, which corresponds to the region of Inner Mongolia in China. Inner Mongolia was given its name because it was more directly administered by the Qing court; Outer Mongolia (which is further from the capital Beijing) had a greater degree of autonomy within the Qing empire.

There are three alternate terms, including Ar Mongol, Mobei Mongol, and Outer Mongolia.

=== Ar Mongol ===
The term Ar mongol or Mobei Mongol (Chinese: 漠北蒙古; pinyin: Mòběi Měnggǔ; lit. 'North-of-the-Desert Mongolia') is sometimes used in Chinese and Mongolian languages to refer to North Mongolia when making a distinction with South Mongolia, so as to elide the history of Qing rule and rather imply a geographic unity or distinction of regions inhabited by Mongols in the Mongolian Plateau. There also exists an English term: Northern Mongolia.

Ar Mongol can also be used to refer to Mongolia synchronically, during that time period. In the Mongolian language, the word ar refers to the back side of something, which has been extended to mean the northern side of any spatial entity, e.g. a mountain or a yurt. The word öbür refers to the front/south (and thus protected) side of a mountain. So the difference between South Mongolia and the Mongolian state is conceived as the metaphor of the backward northern side and the south side of a mountain.

In contrast to Mobei Mongol (Chinese: 漠北蒙古), there is also Monan Mongol (Chinese: 漠南蒙古; pinyin: Mònán Měnggǔ; lit. 'South of the Desert Mongolia'), roughly referring to the region now known as South Mongolia.

== Modern usage ==
Today, "Outer Mongolia" is sometimes still informally used to refer to the independent state of Mongolia. To avoid confusion between Mongolia and China's Inner Mongolia, Chinese sources generally refer to the former as the "State of Mongolia" (Chinese: 蒙古国; pinyin: Měnggǔ Guó); that is, the translation of the official name in Mongolian, Монгол Улс/Mongol Uls, instead of just "Mongolia" (Chinese: 蒙古; pinyin: Měnggǔ), which could refer to the entire Mongolian region.

"Outer Mongolia" is also used sometimes colloquially in the English language as a hyperbole to refer to a place that is very far away.

== See also ==
- Mongolia under Qing rule
- Tannu Uriankhai
- Dzungaria
- Outer Northwest China
- Outer Manchuria
- Mongolia–Taiwan relations
