= Wang Shijie =

Chinese politician (1891–1981)

Wang Shih-chieh
- 王世杰
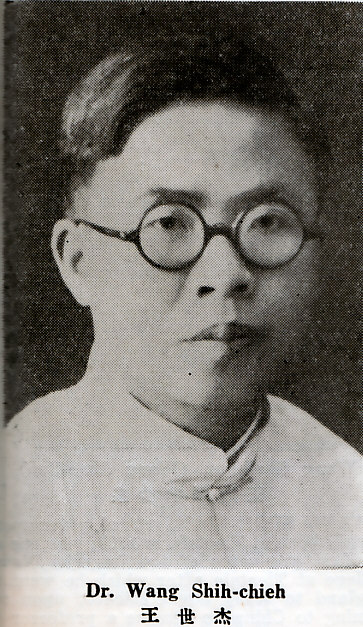
- Wang in Who's Who in China 4th ed., 1931

Minister of Foreign Affairs of the Republic of China
- In office 30 July 1945 – 27 December 1948
- Premier: Weng Wenhao; Sun Fo
- Preceded by: T. V. Soong
- Succeeded by: Wu Tiecheng

Personal details
- Born: 10 March 1891 Chongyang County, Wuchang, Hubei Province, China
- Died: 21 April 1981 (aged 90) Taipei, Taiwan
- Party: Kuomintang
- Spouse: Xiao Dehua (m. 1922)
- Children: 4, including Wang Chiu-Hwa
- Education: Beiyang University; University of London; University of Paris

Wang Shih-chieh also known as Wang Shijie (Chinese: 王世杰; pinyin: Wáng Shìjié; 10 March 1891 – 21 April 1981) was a Chinese politician of the Republic of China. He signed the message of goodwill on behalf of the Government of China to the Constituent Assembly of India at its inaugural meeting on the 9th of December 1946.

== Biography ==
Wang was born on 10 March 1891 in Chongyang County, Wuchang Prefecture, Hubei, during the late Qing dynasty. Wang entered the Department of Mining and Metallurgy at Peiyang University in Tianjin in 1910. In 1911, he participated in the Wuchang Uprising. In 1917, he received a Bachelor of Laws degree from the London School of Economics and Political Science. In 1920, he received a Doctor of Laws degree from the University of Paris. He returned to China in 1918.

In 1928, Wang was appointed as a member of the first Legislative Yuan. In 1929, he became the first president of Wuhan University.

On 30 July 1945, the National Government approved the resignation of T. V. Soong from his concurrent post as Minister of Foreign Affairs and replaced him with Wang Shijie. On 14 August 1945, Wang Shijie and Soviet Foreign Minister Vyacheslav Molotov signed the Sino-Soviet Treaty of Friendship and Alliance in Moscow.

During the negotiations leading to the Double Tenth Agreement in 1945, Wang Shijie served as the Kuomintang's chief representative in the talks with the Chinese Communist Party, with most discussions conducted between him and Zhou Enlai.

== In Taiwan ==
Wang Shijie retreated with the Nationalists to Taiwan in 1949. After arriving in Taiwan, he remained active in politics including representing China before the UN General Assembly prior to 1972. He was president of Academia Sinica from 1962 to 1970.

== Family ==
In 1922, Wang married Xiao Dehua, the younger sister of the famous musician Xiao Youmei, in Beijing. He had four children, one of whom was Wang Chiu-Hwa. Wang died on 21 April 1981 at the age of 90.

== See also ==
- Academia Sinica
- Minister of Foreign Affairs (Republic of China)
- Sino-Soviet Treaty of Friendship and Alliance
