= Wang Chiu-Hwa =

Taiwanese architect (1925–2021)

- 王秋華
- Born: 8 August 1925; Beijing, Republic of China
- Died: 14 June 2021 (aged 95); Taipei, Taiwan
- Education: National Central University (BS); University of Washington (BA); Columbia University (MArch)
- Occupation: Architect
- Awards: Outstanding Architect of Taiwan ROC

Chinese name
- Traditional Chinese: 王秋華
- Simplified Chinese: 王秋华
Transcriptions
Standard Mandarin
- Hanyu Pinyin: Wáng Qiūhuá
- Wade–Giles: Wang2 Ch'iu1-Hua2
- IPA: [wǎŋ tɕʰjóʊ.xwǎ]

Wang Chiu-Hwa (Chinese: 王秋華; 8 August 1925 – 14 June 2021) was a Taiwanese architect noted for her work with libraries in Taiwan. Due to the many libraries she designed and the fact she pioneered the earliest modern university library in Taiwan, Wang was given the unofficial title of "Taiwan’s 'Mother of Libraries'".

== Biography ==
=== Studies and work in the United States: 1940s–1979 ===
Wang was born in Beiping on 8 August 1925. Her father was Wang Shijie, a scholar and politician who moved to Taiwan during the Chinese Civil War, her mother, Xiao Dehua, was a painter, and the musician Xiao Youmei was her maternal uncle. After earning her bachelor's degree in architecture at the National Central University in Chongqing, China, which was China's first university programme for architecture. Wang Chiu-Hwa moved to Seattle to continue her studies at the University of Washington in 1946. She then studied at Columbia University in New York City and obtained her master's degree in architecture in 1949. She was one of the first Asian women to study architecture at University of Washington and the Columbia University's Graduate School of Architecture, Planning and Preservation. Wang earned her architecture licence in 1960.

From 1953 to 1979, Wang worked with American architect Percival Goodman in New York City. She began working for him part-time as a designer while being his student, and then worked for him full-time for almost thirty years, starting as an associate in 1960 and then becoming a partner. Wang's first project with Goodman was designing the Fairmount Temple in Beachwood Village, Ohio (1953). Goodman exerted great influence on her architectural ideas; like Goodman, she strongly believed in the notion of the architect as having a social responsibility through their work. She is quoted as saying “as a designer, you must concern yourself first and foremost with the well-being of the majority, not just the interests of a few wealthy people.”

One of Wang's nicknames was the "architect in a qipao" due to the fact she often wore one to construction sites. Wang spoke out against the practice of prioritising private cars over public transport. One such example is when Wang and Goodman, in collaboration with their students at Columbia University, designed an unsolicited proposal for Manhattanville-on-Hudson that was intended to counter urban planner Robert Moses’ proposal to focus on building highways in mid-twentieth century New York.

=== Return to Taiwan: 1979–2021 ===
Wang Chiu-Hwa returned to Taiwan in 1979. She began teaching at the Taipei Institute of Technology and Tamkang University, and served as architectural consultant to a number of public institutions. In 1983, after collaborating with architect Joshua J. Pan on the Chung Yuan Christian University library, she started her own practice and has since been working in joint venture with J. J. Pan and Partners, Architects and Planners, on a number of projects. Wang was named Outstanding Architect of Taiwan ROC in 2003. She won the 2020 National Award for the Arts in architecture, and was the first woman recipient of the prize since an award for architecture was established in 1997.

Wang Chiu-Hwa died of heart failure at Taipei City Renai Hospital at around 2 p.m. on 14 June 2021, less than two months before her 96th birthday.

== Work ==
Wang Chiu-Hwa's architectural designs are modernistic, with emphasis on environmental totality and scale.

Between 1983 and 1985, she designed the main library of Chung Yuan Christian University, which exemplifies her sense of spatial planning. It has a holding capacity of 700,000 volumes, a conference room with room for 150 people, and a study room with room for 800 people. Its multiple-entry plazas and sunken gardens were designed to encourage socialising. A special feature of the library is the attention given to energy conservation. Natural lighting and ventilation were made possible through the use of double-height spaces, also providing visual fluidity and transparency. This was her first major project after returning to Taiwan, and it won her the Taiwan Provincial Building Design Award and the National Building Design Award for Passive Energy Efficiency.

Over the next three decades, she designed a number of large and award-winning buildings in Taiwan, including but not limited to:

- 1986: Precision Instruments Development Center for the National Science Council
- 1988: Medical Research Building & Conference Center for Veterans General Hospital in Taichung
- 1989: Gymnasium at Chung Yuan Christian University
- 1989: Main Library of National Chang Hwa Normal University
- 1991–97: Doctors' Dormitory of Taichung Veterans General Hospital
- 1993: Main Library and Information Sciences Center at the National Chung Cheng University
- 1998: Founder's Memorial Library at the Chinese Culture University in Taipei
- 1997–2004: Holistic Education Village at Chung Yung Christian University
- 2000–2005: Gymnasium at Chinese Culture University

Noted for her work on libraries in Taiwan, Wang Chiu-Hwa was affectionately known as the "Mother of Taiwanese libraries".

In 2015, Wang Chiu-Hwa donated a large part of her archive to the M+ Collection Archives in Hong Kong.
