= 1945 Mongolian independence referendum =

- 20 October 1945
- Referendum on the independence of the Mongolian People's Republic from China

Results
Choice	Votes	%
Yes	487,409	100.00%
No	0	0.00%
Valid votes	487,409	100.00%
Invalid or blank votes	0	0.00%
Total votes	487,409	100.00%
Registered voters/turnout	494,960	98.47%

An independence referendum was held in the Mongolian People's Republic on 20 October 1945. It was approved by 100% of voters, with no votes against, according to official statistics. Voter turnout was 98%.

== Background ==
Outer Mongolia had gained de facto independence from the Qing dynasty during the Xinhai Revolution in 1911. The independence of Outer Mongolia was supported by the Russian Empire, and later in 1915, the Treaty of Kyakhta was signed between the Bogd Khanate of Mongolia, the Russian Empire, and the newly founded Republic of China (ROC). The 1915 Treaty recognized Mongolia's autonomy within the ROC. Following the outbreak of the Russian Civil War in 1917, Chinese troops entered and occupied Mongolia in 1919, effectively abolishing its autonomy and the reign of the Bogd Khan.

In February 1921, the last Chinese troops in Mongolia had been expelled by the White Russian general Roman von Ungern-Sternberg, prompting Soviet intervention in Mongolia. On 18 March 1921, Chinese troops in Urga were routed by Baron Ungern-Sternberg's White Russian (Buryats, Russians, etc.) and Mongolian forces. Consequently, the Bogd Khanate and its government were restored by Ungern-Sternberg. Revolutionaries opposing the Chinese occupation and the White Russians founded the Mongolian People's Party (MPP) in June 1920. The MPP, allied with the Red Army, defeated the White Russians by June 1921 and entered Urga in July. Subsequently, the People's Provisional Government declared victory of the People's Revolution and crowned the Bogd Khan as a limited monarch.

After the death of the Bogd Khan in 1924, the Mongolian People's Republic was established following the ratification of a new constitution. The Mongolian People's Republic was effectively an unrecognized satellite state of the Soviet Union (USSR), having participated in the liberation of Manchuria. Towards the end of World War II, the USSR pushed China for formal recognition of the status quo, threatening to stir up Mongolian nationalism within China. In the Sino-Soviet Treaty of Friendship and Alliance, signed on 14 August 1945, the ROC agreed to recognize Mongolian independence within its current frontiers should the Mongolian people vote for independence through a referendum.

From August 30 onwards, the Mongolian government deployed considerable means to campaign for independence, eventually holding some 13,000 mass meetings. The Referendum would be held on October 20 with Li Fazhang (ROC deputy minister of interior) as an observer.

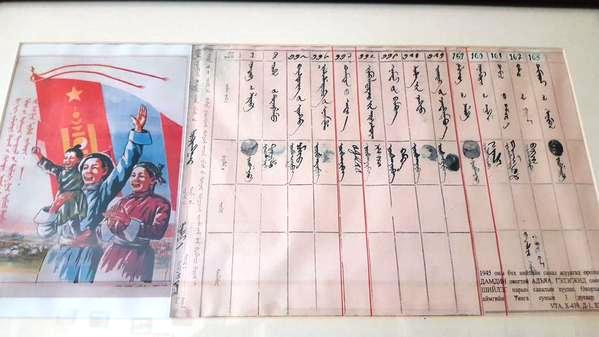
Pro-independence leaflet (left) and a ballot paper (right)

== Results ==
Choice	Votes	%
For	487,409	100.00
Against	0	0.00
Total	487,409	100.00
Valid votes	487,409	100.00
Invalid/blank votes	0	0.00
Total votes	487,409	100.00
Registered voters/turnout	494,960	98.47
Source: Nohlen et al.

== Reactions ==
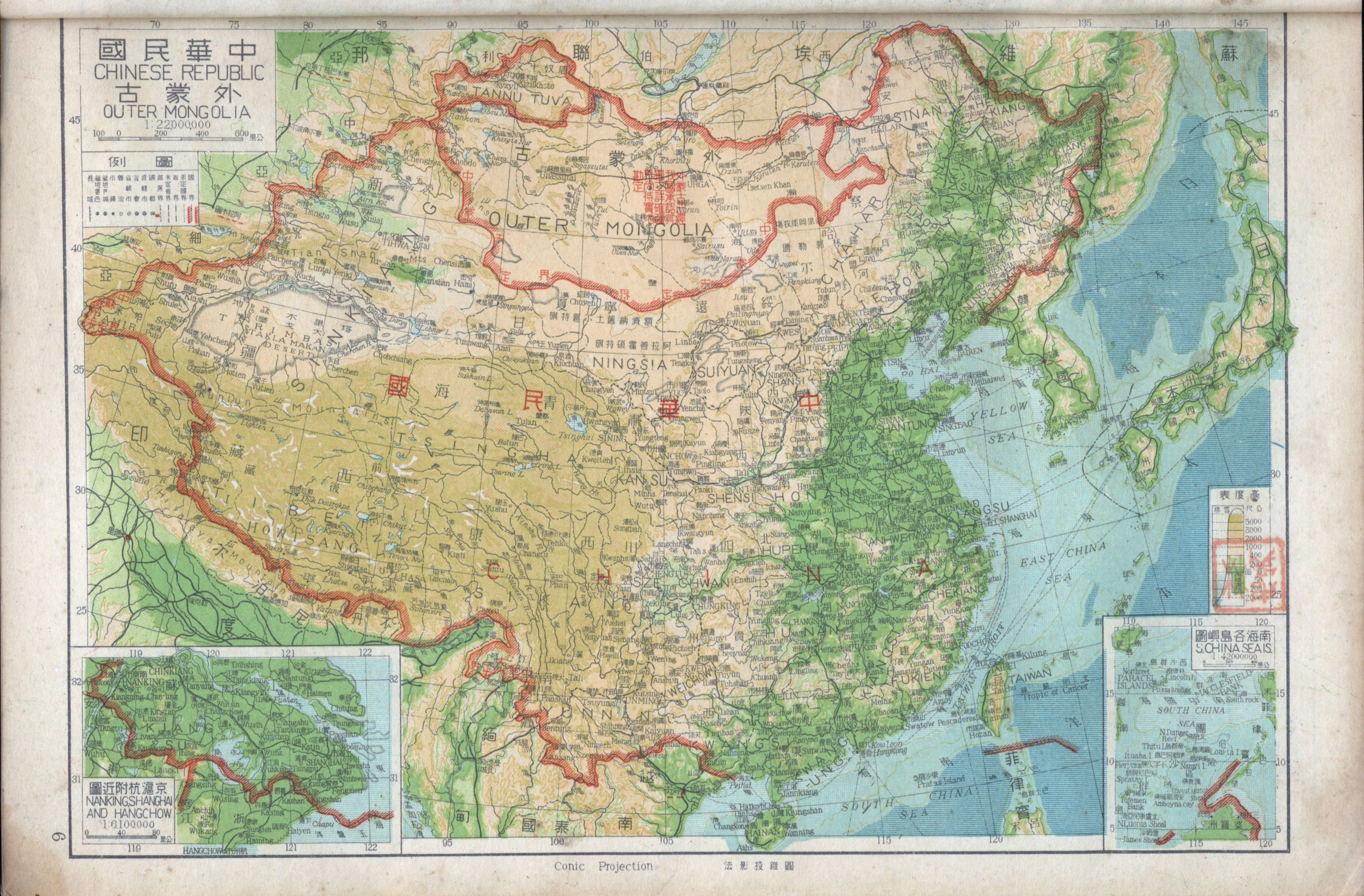
Map of the Republic of China and the Mongolian People's Republic published in 1947

On January 6 1946, the Nationalist government of China officially recognized the "independence of Outer Mongolia" based on the referendum results - formal recognition was further exchanged at a ceremony on February 13.

== Analysis ==
At the scientific conference dedicated to the 70th anniversary of the referendum, Zandaakhüügiin Enkhbold, speaker of the State Great Khural, said that the 1945 referendum was the first democratic vote in Mongolia and of great historical significance to the independence of the country.

Sergey Radchenko, a professor of East China Normal University, noted that the "referendum was regarded by both sides as political theatre, due to the peculiarity of a supposed unanimous 100% vote in favour."

== See also ==
- Modern Mongolian history
- Outer Mongolia
