= Sino-Soviet Treaty of Friendship and Alliance =

1945 treaty between the Republic of China and Soviet Union

Treaty of Friendship and Alliance
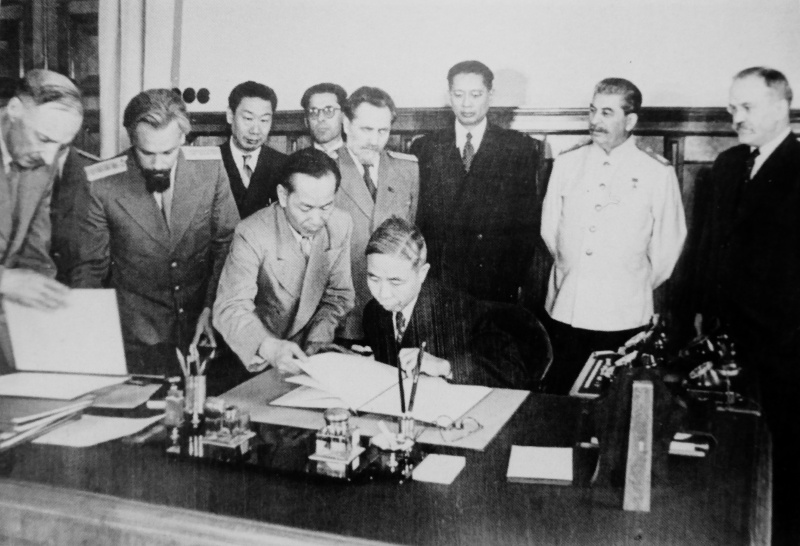
- Wang Shijie signing the treaty as ROC Foreign Minister, with Vyacheslav Molotov, Joseph Stalin and TV Soong standing in backgrounds (first to third from the right respectively).
- Signed: 14 August 1945
- Expiry: 24 February 1953
- Signatories: Wang Shijie; Vyacheslav Molotov
- Parties: China; Soviet Union

Treaty of Friendship and Alliance in page 300 of Volume 10 of the United Nations Treaty Series (10 UNTS 300)

The Treaty of Friendship and Alliance (Chinese: 中蘇友好同盟條約, Russian: Договор о дружбе и союзе между СССР и Китайской Республикой) was a treaty signed by the National Government of the Republic of China and the Government of the Union of Soviet Socialist Republics on 14 August 1945, at the time of Japan's surrender. Soviet and Mongolian troops then occupied Inner Mongolia and Manchuria, after they had seized it from the Japanese during World War II.

During the preceding Sino-Soviet negotiations, despite the lack of a consensus on a formal treaty, the Soviets had already launched the Soviet invasion of Manchuria on August 9, 1945 and, one week later, seized the Allied-recognized Chinese territory of Manchuria and Inner Mongolia (then known as Manchukuo and Mengjiang) from the Japanese Empire.

On 14 August 1945, Republic of China Foreign Minister Wang Shijie and Soviet Foreign Minister Vyacheslav Molotov signed the treaty in Moscow. In a declaration made in connection with the treaty, China accepted the independence of Outer Mongolia within its previous borders and disavowed any Pan-Mongolist intentions of the occupiers if a referendum on the issue was held. Also, the Soviet Union was to cease its aid to the Chinese Communist Party and the Ili National Army's rebellion in Xinjiang. Both nations also agreed upon joint control of the Chinese Eastern Railway and to facilitate its eventual return to full Chinese sovereignty.

The attached diplomatic notes contained two main provisions: the Soviets withdraw all of their army from Manchuria within three months of signing the treaty, and "in view of the Outer Mongolian people's repeated expressions of their desire for independence, the Republic of China government agrees to hold a referendum to determine Outer Mongolia's independence after Japan's defeat," with no specified time limit. It was also agreed that after the Soviet Union deployed troops to defeat Japan, provided that the Soviet Union respects the Chinese sovereignty and territorial integrity of Manchuria and does not interfere in Xinjiang's internal affairs, the outcome of a fair referendum shall decide whether on China's part to recognize the Mongolian People's Republic. On October 20, 1945, Outer Mongolia held a referendum in which 97% of the citizens voted in favor of the independent sovereignty of the Mongolian People's Republic.

However, in the years that followed, China noticed that the Soviets had secretly and continuously supported the Chinese Communist Party and the People's Liberation Army, which opposed the ruling Kuomintang and the government of the Republic of China. The relation collapsed after the Chinese Communist Party had proclaimed the People's Republic of China in Beijing on 1 October 1949, which was recognized by the Soviet Union. The UN General Assembly adopted Resolution 505 on 1 February 1952, which confirmed that the Soviet Union had violated the terms of the treaty by assisting the Chinese Communist Party during the Chinese Civil War.

Documents from the Republic of China regard it as an unequal treaty. On 24 February 1953, the Legislative Yuan of the Republic of China, which retreated to Taiwan, voted to officially terminate its commitments to the Sino-Soviet Treaty of Friendship and Alliance as well and rescinded its recognition of the independence of the Mongolian People's Republic.

After the proclamation of the People's Republic of China on the Communist mainland, in 1950 the Soviet Union signed a new treaty with Communist China, the Sino-Soviet Treaty of Friendship, Alliance and Mutual Assistance, which replaced this treaty, as declared in the new treaty.

== Background ==
In early 1945, the United States, noting that a decisive victory had not yet been achieved in the Pacific Theater and that the atomic bomb had not been successfully tested, estimated that a full defeat of Japan would require the sacrifice of 1,000,000 American troops and 500,000 British troops. Consequently, at the Yalta Conference in February 1945, US President Franklin Roosevelt and British Prime Minister Winston Churchill, together with Joseph Stalin, agreed that the Soviets would declare war on Japan after they had won the war against Germany. At the conference, Stalin set forth a number of conditions, some of which were critical to and even compromised China's interests, as follows:

Within two to three months after Germany's surrender and the end of the European war, the Soviet Union would assist the Allied forces in the war against Japan on the following terms:

1. The status quo in Outer Mongolia (the Mongolian People's Republic) would be maintained.

2. The old rights and interests of Imperial Russia, which were violated in 1904 by Japan's treacherous attack, were to be restored as follows:

(a). The southern part of Sakhalin Island and all adjacent islands were to be returned to the Soviet Union.

(b). The Port of Dalian was to be internationalized, with the Soviet Union's preferential rights in that port guaranteed; the lease of Port Arthur for use as a naval base by the Soviet Union was also to be restored.

(c). A joint Sino‑Soviet company was to be established to manage the Chinese Eastern Railway and the South Manchurian Railway. Under the arrangement, the Soviet Union's reserved leading roles were to be guaranteed, and China was to retain full sovereignty over Manchuria.

(d). The Kuril Islands were to be transferred to the Soviet Union.

3. The above agreements concerning Outer Mongolia and the ports and railways in Manchuria were to be subject to the approval of Generalissimo Chiang Kai-Shek; and, on the proposal of General Secretary Stalin, US President Roosevelt was to take measures to secure that approval.

On March 12, 1945, Roosevelt informed Wei Tao-ming, the Chinese ambassador to the United States in Washington, of the main provisions of the Yalta Agreement concerning China:

1. The status quo in Outer Mongolia would be maintained.

2. The ownership of the South Manchurian Railway would remain with China, but its operation would be managed under a trustee mandate.

3. The Soviet Union sought to obtain a warm-water naval port, such as Port Arthur or a nearby port, to the south of Vladivostok.

On April 29, 1945, the US ambassador to China, Patrick J. Hurley, conveyed full contents of the above clauses to Chiang Kai-Shek and Wang Shijie. Hurley emphasized that his report was "based on the oral statements of Roosevelt and on records of discussions between Roosevelt and Stalin, and is entirely accurate." On May 22, Wang Shijie transmitted the contents of these Yalta clauses by telegram to then Chinese Foreign Minister T.V. Soong, who was in the US attending the founding conference of the United Nations in New York. On June 9 and 13, Soong met twice in Washington with US President Harry Truman to request an explanation from the United States on these clauses with the Soviets. President Truman, after receiving a report from his personal representative Harry Hopkins in Moscow, met on June 9 at the White House with TV Soong and Acting Secretary of State Joseph Grew for discussions. The report, by Harry Hopkins, conveyed his very recent obtaining of Stalin's oral statements to support the Nationalist government, endorsing Chinese unification under Chiang, and further Soviet guarantees of China's territorial sovereignty in Manchuria. Under the pretext of "maintaining world peace," pressure was then exerted on China, requiring that Soong travel to the Soviet Union no later than July 1, 1945, and that the Chinese government negotiate with the Soviets and sign a "Sino‑Soviet Treaty of Friendship and Alliance." Truman did not give a direct answer regarding the Yalta Agreement clauses concerning China; he underlined to Soong that his primary concern was "how to secure the immediate participation of the Soviet Union in the war effort against Japan, rather than peripheral issues."

On June 12, 1945, the Soviet ambassador to China, Apollon Petrov, also visited the Nationalist Government Chairman Residence in Chungking and presented a document outlining "five prerequisite conditions" for the initiation of the Sino-Soviet phase of negotiations. The document stated the following conditions:

1. Restoration of the lease of Port Arthur and the establishment of a Soviet naval base.

2. Internationalization of the Port of Dairen, while ensuring that the Soviet Union retained preferential rights there.

3. The establishment of a joint Sino-Soviet company to operate the Chinese Eastern Railway and the South Manchurian Railway.

4. Maintenance of the status quo in Outer Mongolia (the Mongolian People's Republic), thereby allowing it to be formally recognized as an independent state.

5. Assignment to the Soviet Union of the southern part of Sakhalin Island, all adjacent islands, and the Kuril Islands.

If Generalissimo Chiang agreed to those basic prerequisites, the Soviet Union was prepared to immediately begin negotiations on concluding a Sino-Soviet Treaty of Friendship and Alliance.

== See also ==
- Sino-Soviet Treaty of Friendship, Alliance and Mutual Assistance
- United Nations General Assembly Resolution 505
- Mongolia–Taiwan relations
